= List of bicycle types =

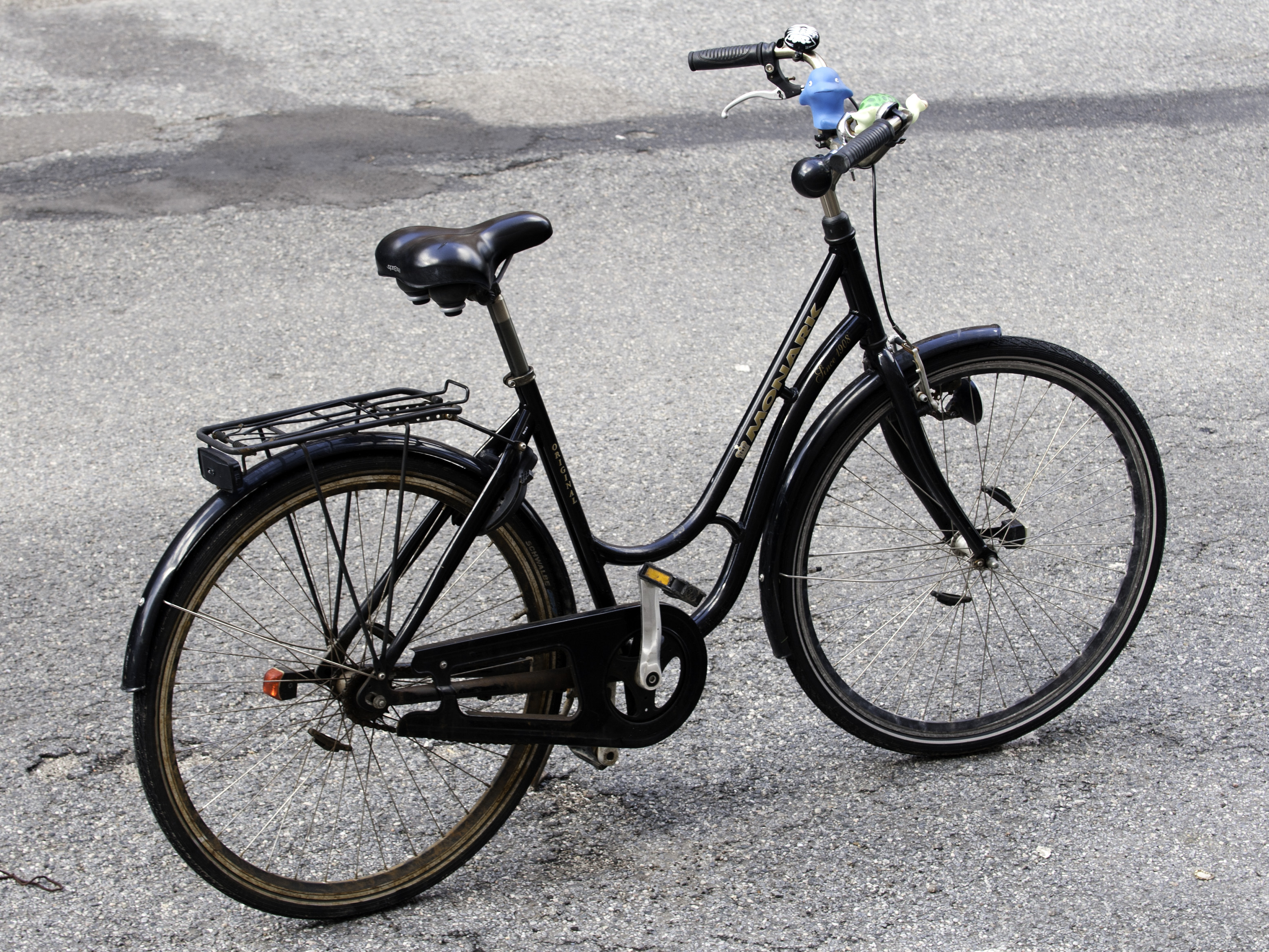
Bicycles can be categorized by function, number of riders, gearing, sport, means of propulsion, position of the rider or as here the frame type: This is a type intended for use by women, with a lowered top tube due to consideration for skirts.

This list gives an overview of different types of bicycles, categorized by function (racing, recreation, etc.); number of riders (one, two, or more); by construction or frame type (upright, folding, etc.); by gearing (single speed, derailleur gears, etc.); by sport (mountain biking, BMX, triathlon, etc.); by means of propulsion (human-powered, motor-assisted, etc.); and by rider position (upright, recumbent, etc.) The list also includes miscellaneous types such as pedicabs, rickshaws, and clown bikes. The categories are not mutually exclusive; as such, a bike type may appear in more than one category.

== By function ==
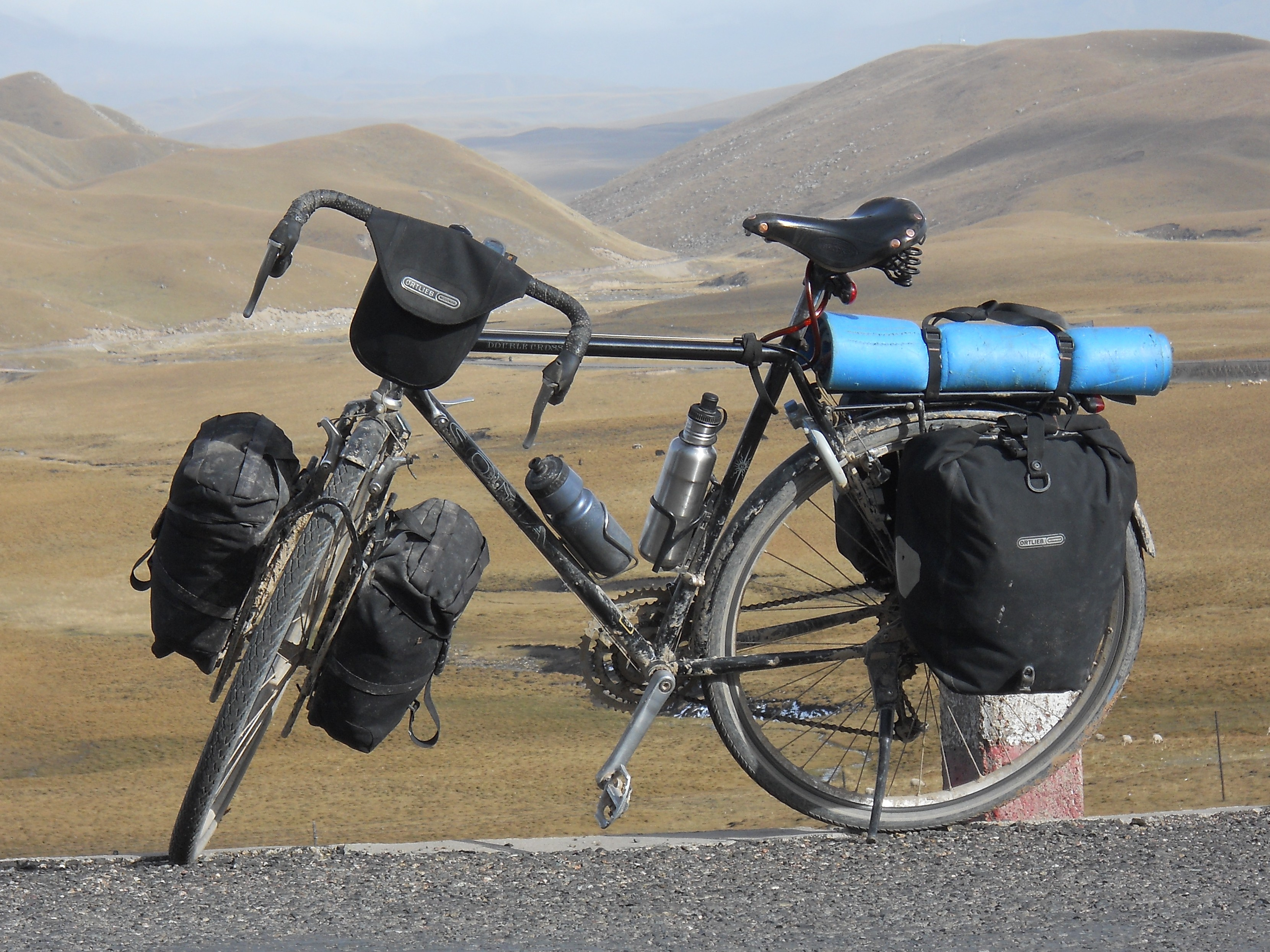
A modern touring bicycle, with accessories and baggage

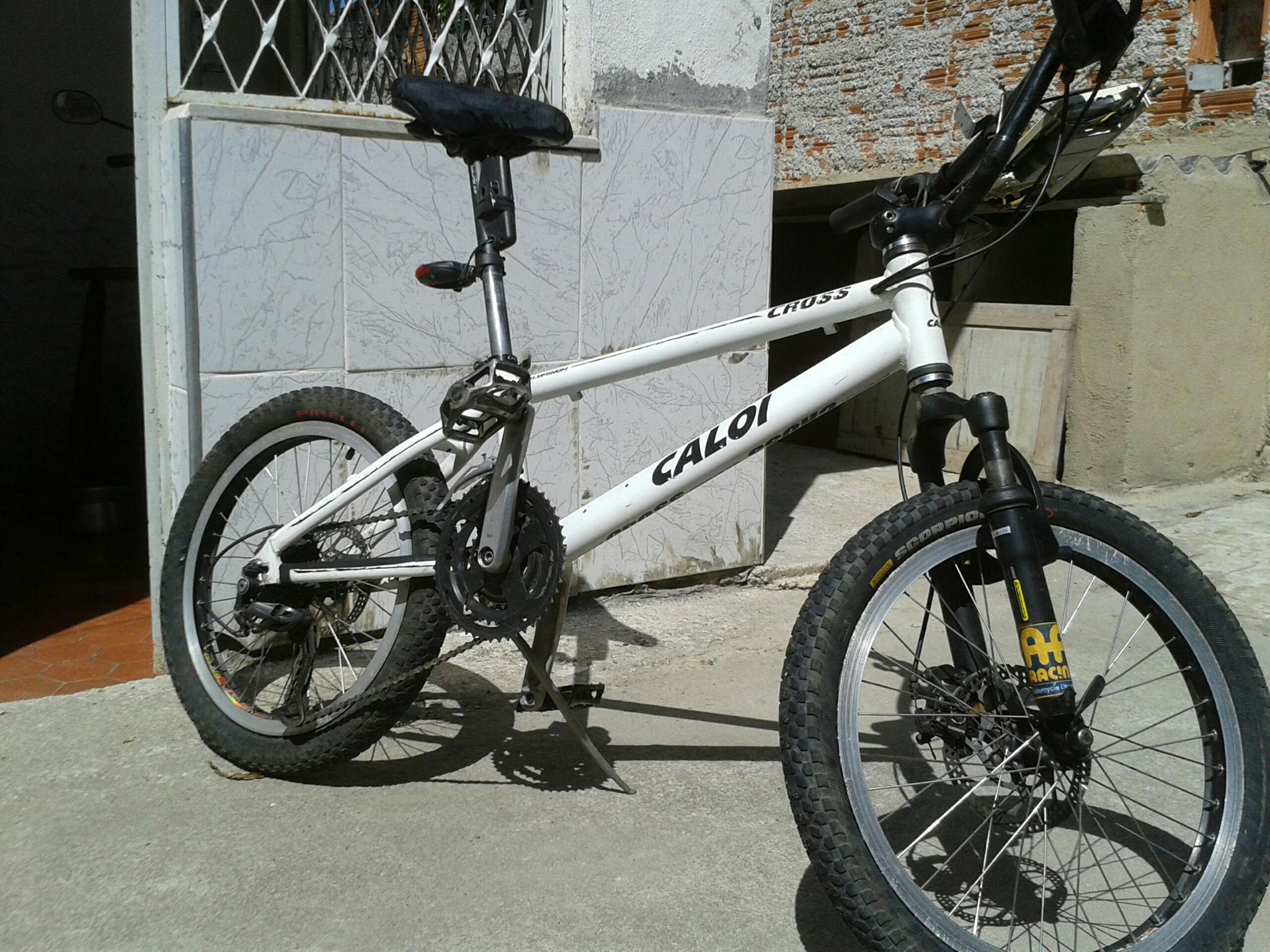
An aluminum BXR bike made by Caloi and built using Shimano Acera and 27 Speed and a wheelset with 36 spoke count.

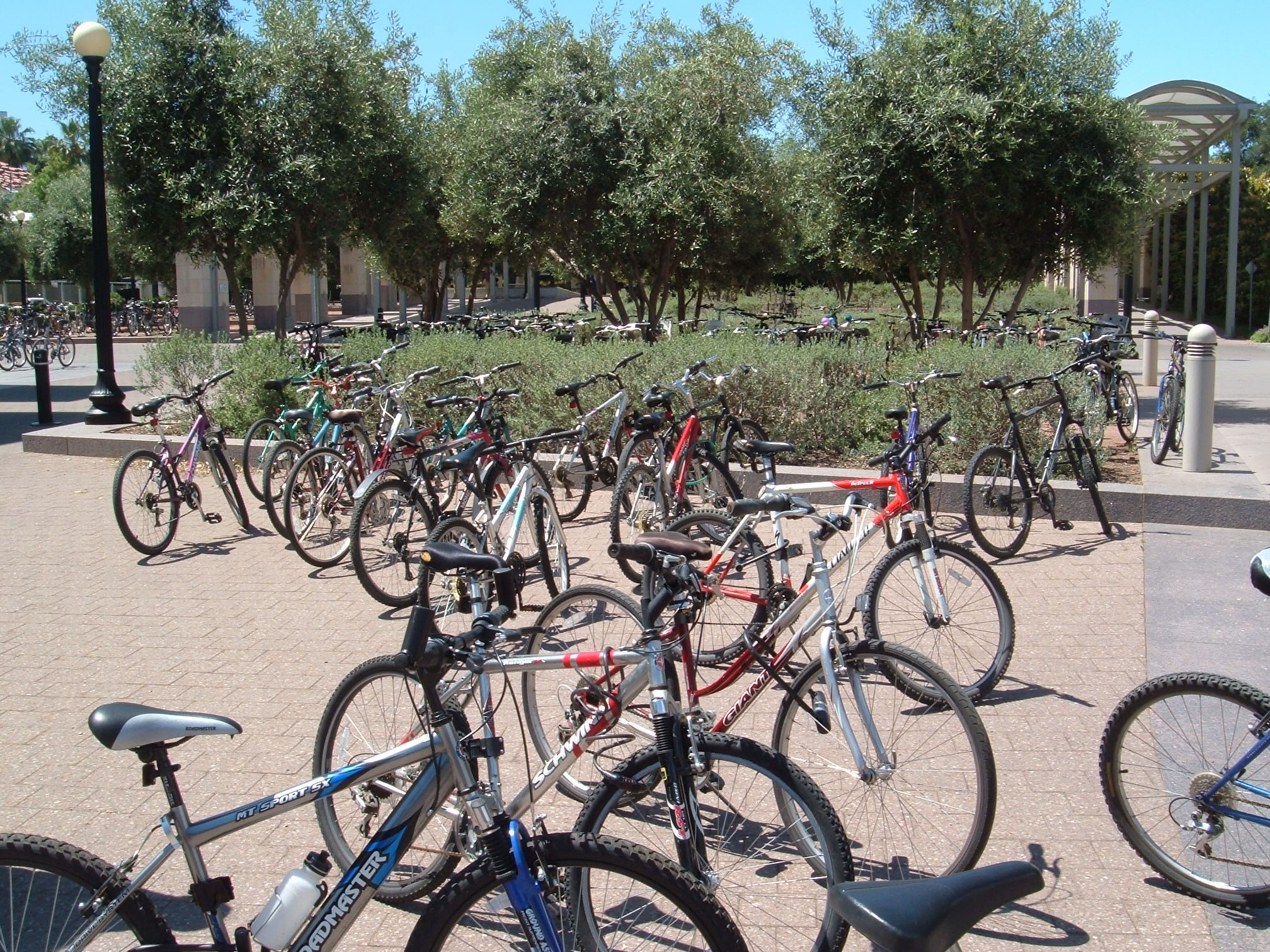
Bicycles parked outside an academic building at Stanford University

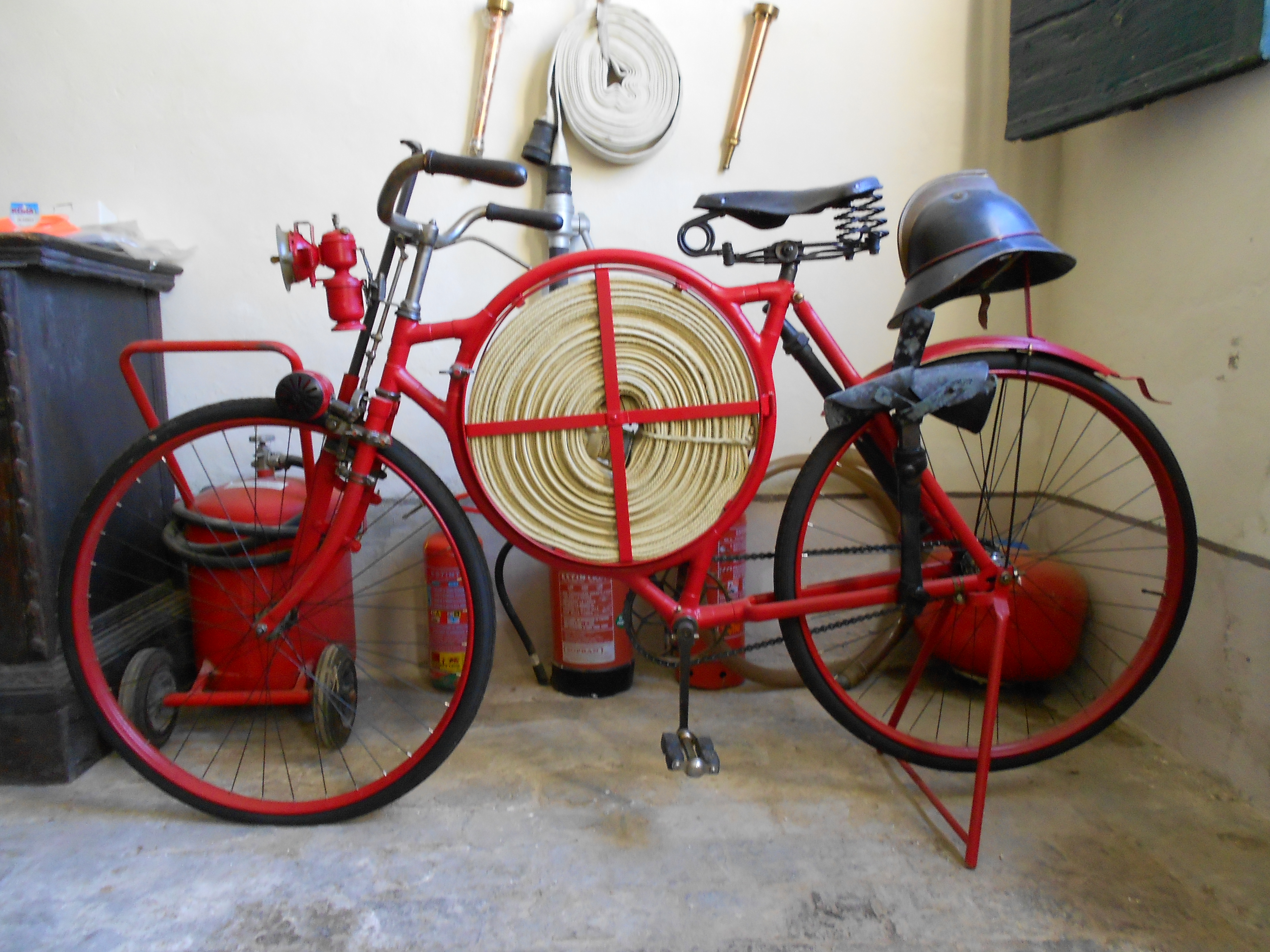
Firefighter bicycle

The main categories of bicycles concerning their intended use are:

- Road bicycles are designed for traveling at speed on paved roads.
- Touring bicycles are designed for bicycle touring and long journeys. They are durable and comfortable, capable of transporting baggage, and have a wide gear range.
  - The BXR bike (a.k.a. Bicycle Crossroadster) or Sport Touring BMX. features a lightweight BMX bike-sized (20-inch/406 mm rims) wheels or (22-inch/451 mm rims) wheels; Built-in frames, usually from the BMX racing, minivelos or foldable city/touring bikes. The riders of this touring bike typically carry the loads in backpacks not to lose agility and speed. Also has wide-range gearing from low ratios to very high ratios, driven with big chainrings or special cassettes like Shimano's Capreo; setup typically with 27 to 33 gears or IGHs.
- Randonneur or Audax bicycles are designed for randonnées or brevet rides, and fall in between racing bicycles and those intended for touring in terms of the frame geometry and weight.
- Hybrid bicycles are a compromise between the mountain and racing style bicycles which replaced European-style utility bikes in North America in the early 1990s. They have a light frame, medium gauge wheels, and derailleur gearing, and feature straight or curved-back, touring handlebars for more upright riding.
  - Trekking bike: a hybrid with all the accessories necessary for bicycle touring—mudguards, pannier rack, lights, etc.
  - Commuter: designed specifically for commuting over short or long distances. It typically features derailleur gearing, 700c wheels with fairly light 1.125-inch (28 mm) tires, a carrier rack, full fenders, and a frame with suitable mounting points for attachment of various load-carrying baskets or panniers. It sometimes, though not always, has an enclosed chainguard to allow a rider to pedal the bike in long pants without entangling them in the chain. A well-equipped commuter bike typically features front and rear lights for use in the early morning or late evening hours encountered at the start or end of a business day
  - City bike: optimized for the rough-and-tumble of urban commuting. The city bike differs from the familiar European city bike in its mountain bike heritage, gearing, and strong yet lightweight frame construction. It usually features mountain bike-sized (26-inch) wheels, a more upright seating position, and fairly wide 1.5–1.95-inch (38–50 mm) heavy belted tires designed to shrug off-road hazards commonly found in the city, such as broken glass. Using a sturdy welded Chromoly or aluminum frame derived from the mountain bike, the city bike is more capable of handling urban hazards such as deep potholes, drainage grates, and jumps off city curbs. City bikes are designed to have reasonably quick, yet solid and predictable handling, and are normally fitted with full fenders for use in all weather conditions. A few city bikes may have enclosed chainguards, while others may be equipped with suspension forks, similar to mountain bikes. City bikes may also come with front and rear lighting systems for use at night or in bad weather.
  - Comfort bike: essentially modern versions of the old roadster and sports roadster bicycle, though modern comfort bikes are often equipped with derailleur rather than hub gearing. They typically have a modified mountain bike frame with a tall head tube to provide an upright riding position, 26-inch wheels, and 1.75 or 1.95-inch (45–50 mm) smooth or semi-slick tires. Comfort bikes typically incorporate such features as front suspension forks, seat post suspension with wide plush saddles, and drop-center, angled North Road style handlebars designed for easy reach while riding in an upright position.
- Flat bar road bikes are road bikes fitted with mountain bike-style shifters, brake levers, and a flat handlebar. They fit into the continuum between hybrids and road bikes.
- Gravel bicycle is a road bicycle designed for riding on gravel and other rough terrain. It has a more slack geometry and fatter tires than a road bike. It is generally used to tackle more rough terrain than cyclo-cross bicycles. Gravel bicycle frames also use characteristics of both cyclocross and road bikes for better comfort on long rides and the wheel clearance to accommodate rides done in torrential conditions.
- Cyclo-cross bike (also known as "cross bike"): A road bicycle frame similar to a racing or sport/touring bicycle, but with more slack geometry, wider rims/tires and cantilever brakes. This bicycle-style was originally intended for racing cyclocross. However, due to their robust design, strong brakes, and more stable geometry, cyclocross bikes are frequently used as commuting, touring.
- Utility bicycles are designed for commuting, shopping and running errands. They employ middle or heavyweight frames and tires and they often have internal hub gearing. To keep the rider clean, they often have full front and rear fenders and chain guards. To make the bike more useful as a commuter vehicle, they are often equipped with a basket. The riding position varies from upright to very upright.
  - Roadster bicycles
  - Dutch bicycles
  - European city bicycles

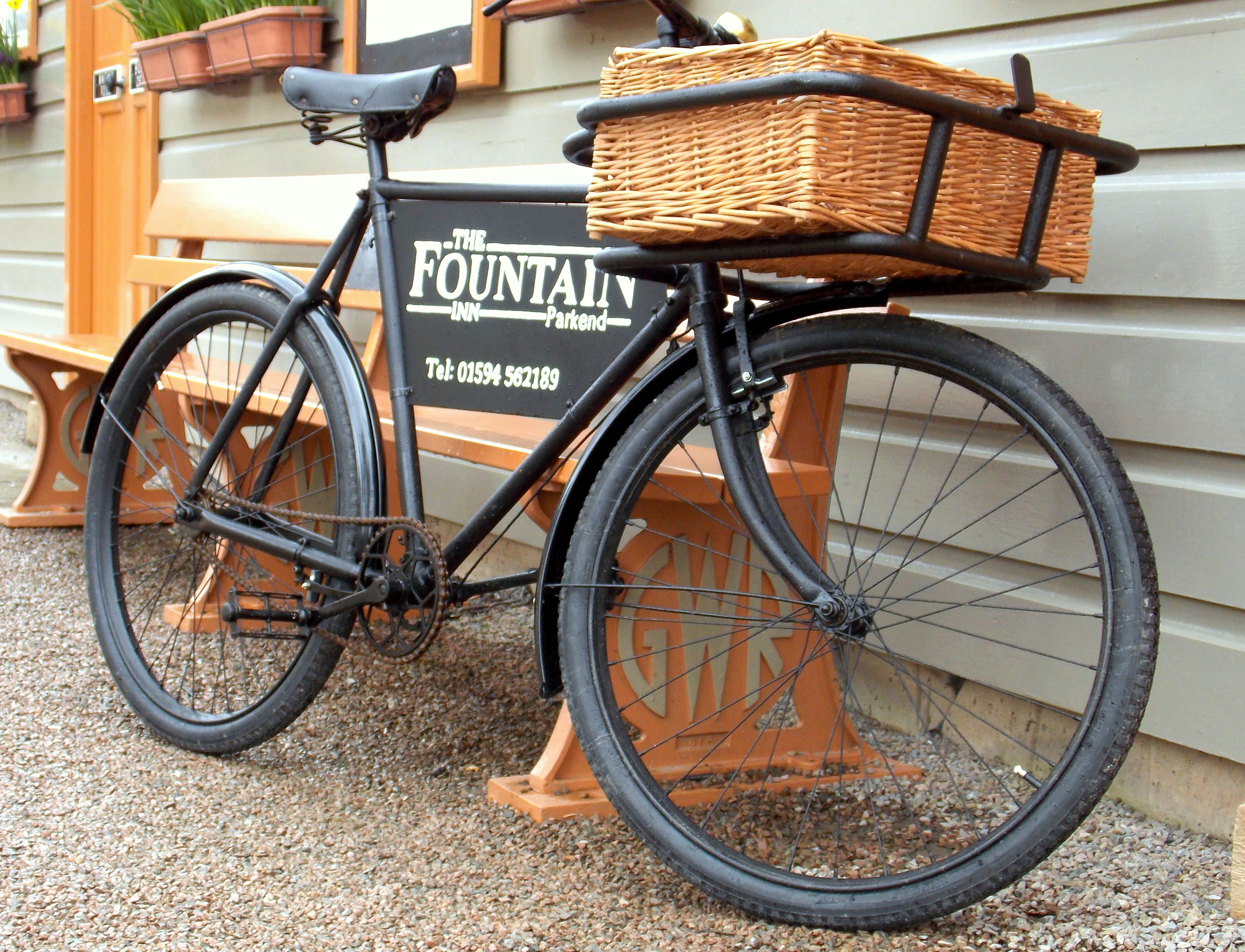
Typical 1930s Butcher's Bike

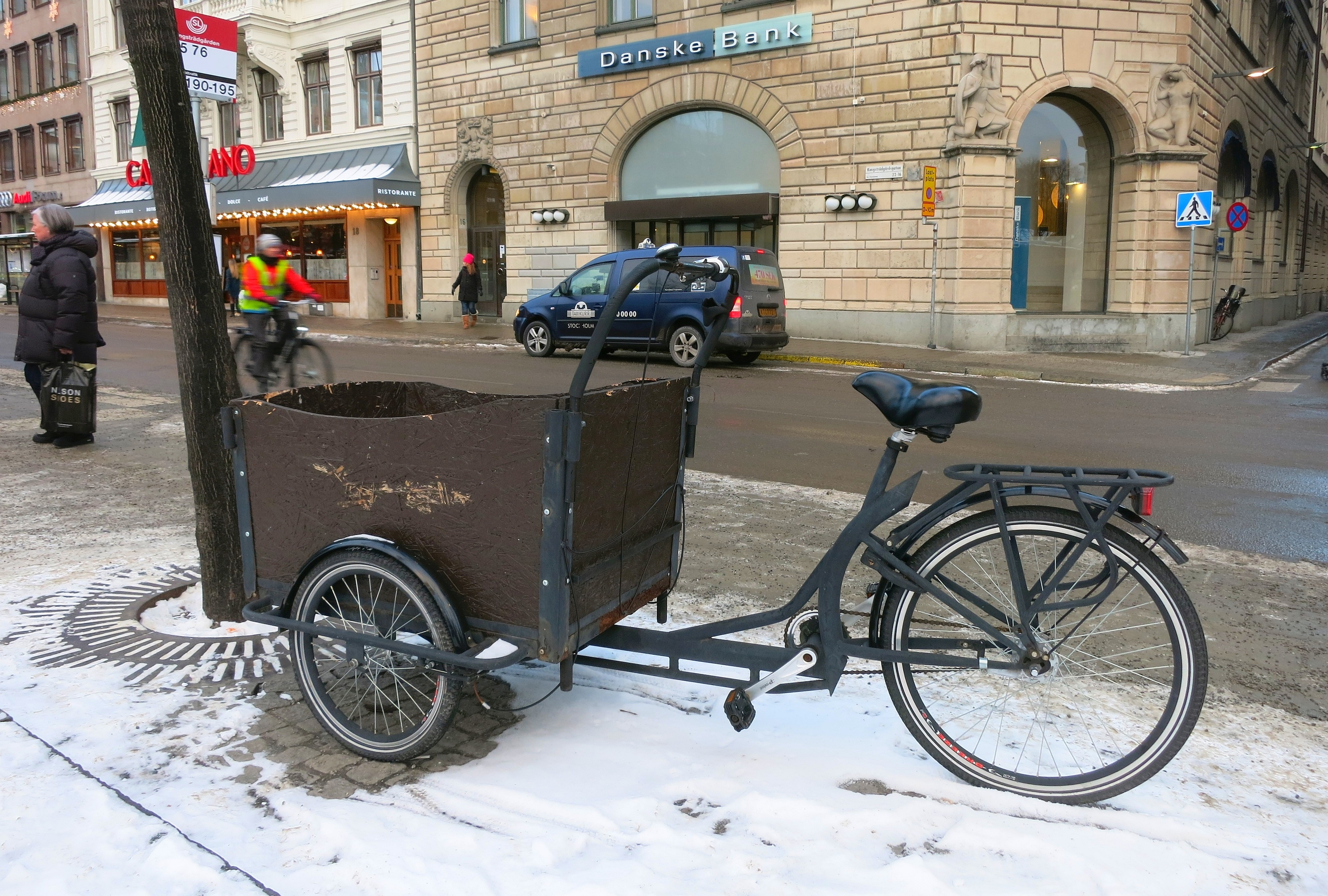
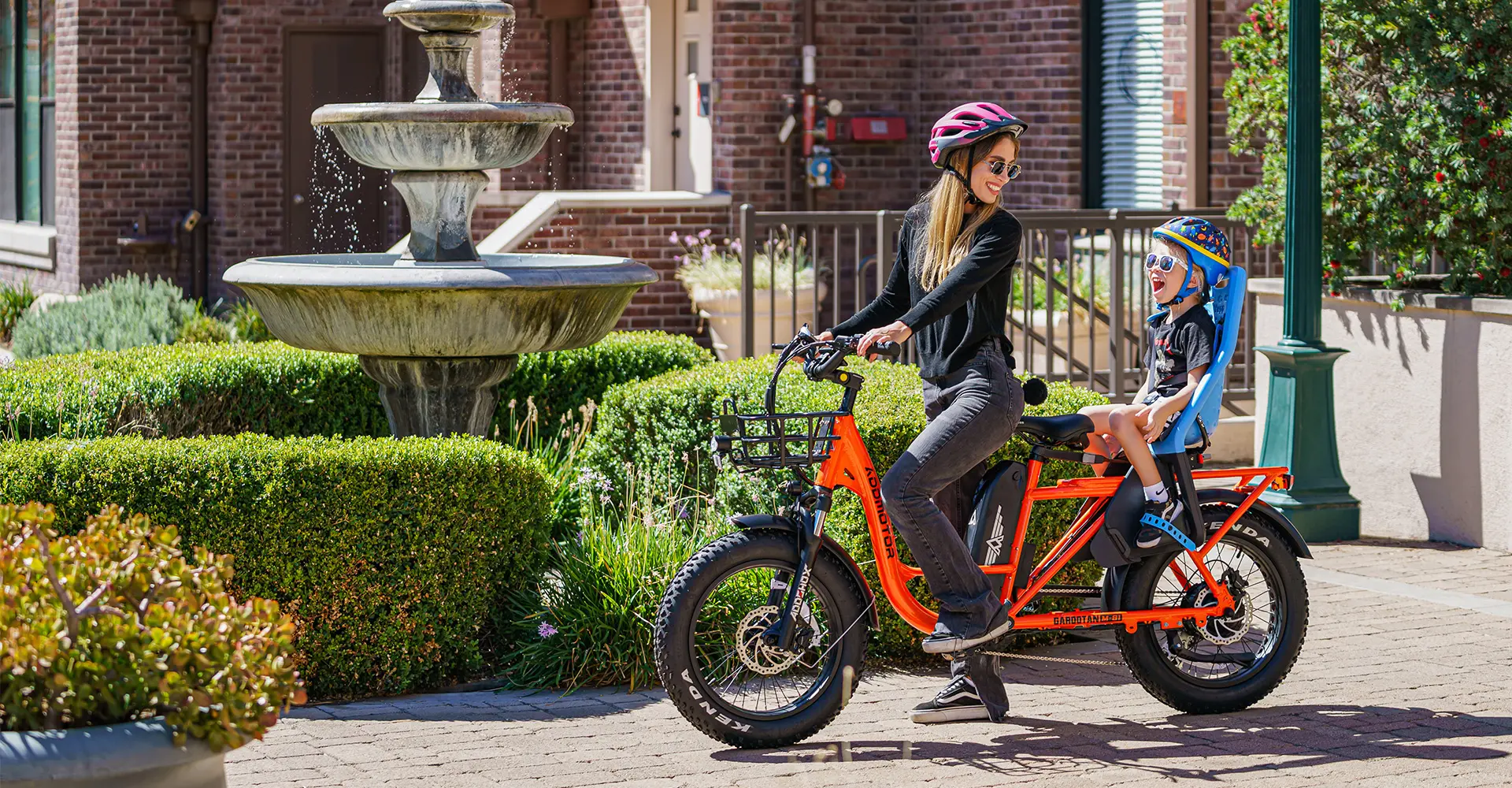
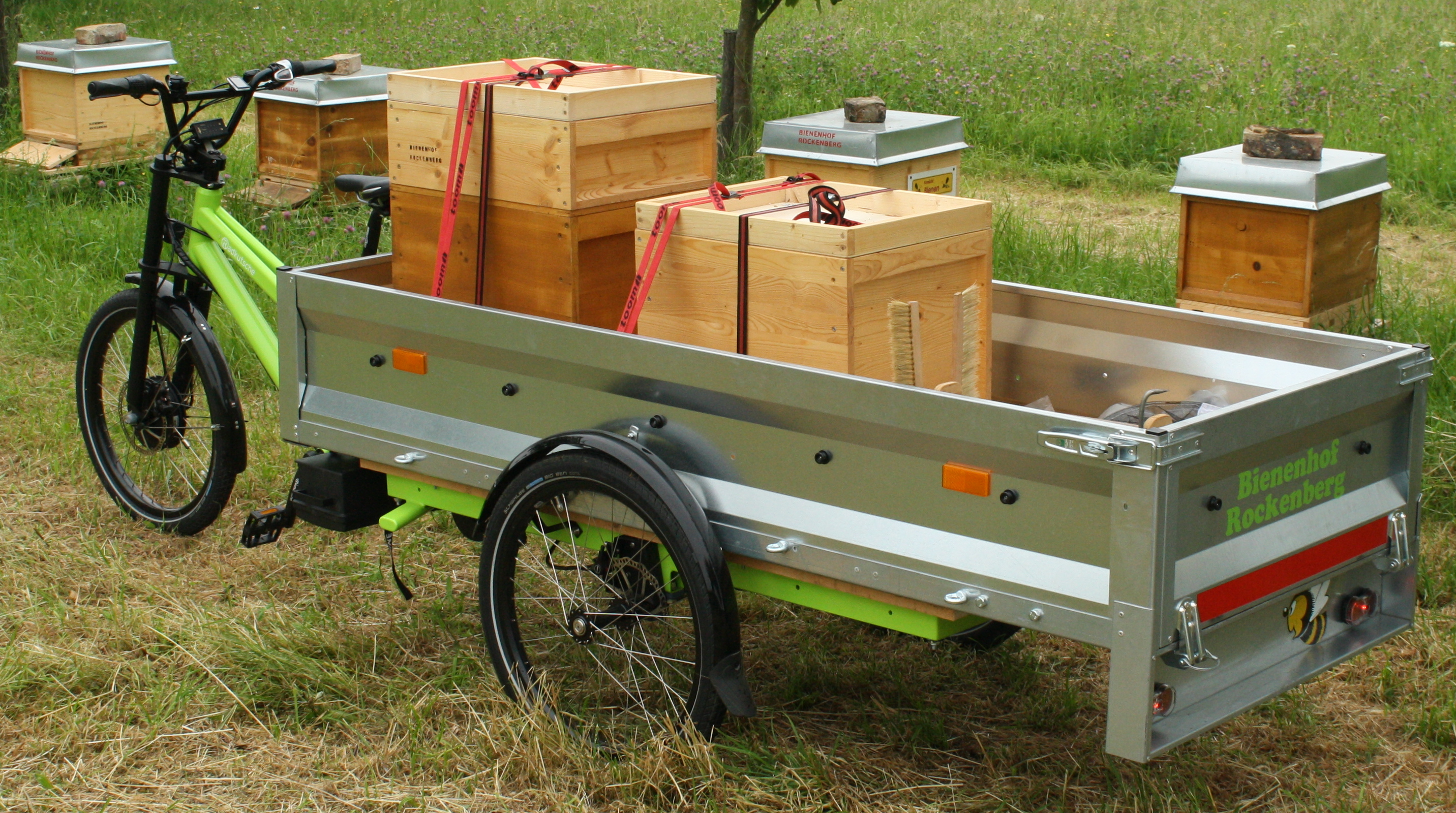
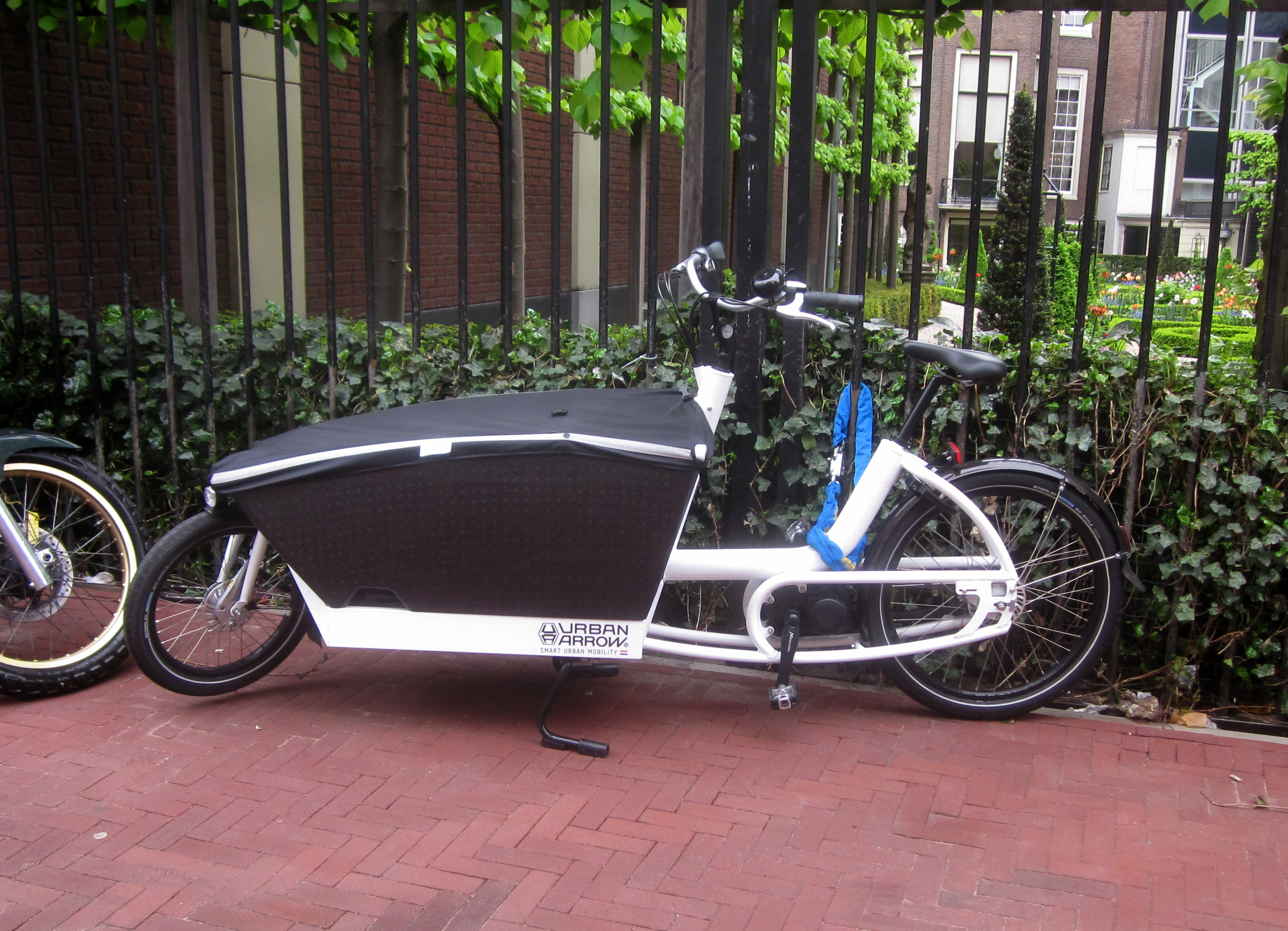
Various types of cargo bikes
- Cargo bikes are designed for transporting large or heavy loads. They often have a flat cargo area or large basket and some also have cargo trailers.
  - Porteur bicycles are a kind of cargo bicycle designed for carrying loads on a platform rack attached to the fork.
  - Butcher's Bikes typically have a basket or storage box mounted within a frame on the front of the bike, and would often feature an advertising sign attached within the main triangle of the bicycle frame. Despite the name, these were popular with a wide variety of trades during the first half of the 20th century, particularly in the United Kingdom.
  - Longtail bicycles are a type of bicycle (specifically a type of long bike) with a longer than usual frame wheelbase at the rear compared to a standard utility bicycle.
  - Boda-boda, also known as a Poda-Poda in some parts of Africa, is a bicycle taxi.
  - Messenger bikes are typically used for urgent deliveries of letters and small packages between businesses in big cities with heavily congested traffic. While any type of bike can be used, messenger bikes are often stripped-down track-style bicycles (especially in the U.S.), with either a fixed or single speed freewheel drivetrains.
- Ice cycles are designed for riding on ice.
- Mountain bicycles (also called All Terrain Bicycle) are designed for off-road cycling. All-mountain bicycles feature sturdy, highly durable frames and wheels, wide-gauge treaded tires, and cross-wise handlebars to help the rider resist sudden jolts. Some mountain bicycles feature various types of suspension systems (e.g. coiled spring, air or gas shock), and hydraulic or mechanical-disc brakes. Mountain bicycle gearing is often very wide-ranging, from very low ratios to mid ratios, typically with 9 to 28 gears, although some riders prefer the mechanical simplicity and ease of maintenance of single-speed mountain bikes.
  - 29ers are mountain bikes that are built to use 700C or ISO 622 mm wheels.
  - 27.5 bikes are mountain bikes that are built to use 650B or ISO 584 mm wheels.
  - Downhill bikes are a specialized type of mountain bike with a very strong frame, altered geometry, and long-travel suspension. They are designed for use only on downhill courses.
  - Freeride bicycles in this category usually have very strong frames and dual-suspension with the travel of six inches and up. They tend to have a shorter wheelbase than downhill bikes but otherwise have very similar geometry and components. Whereas downhill racers tend towards strong and light components, extreme freeriders tend not to worry about weight as much as the strength of materials so it can withstand the huge drops and gaps that they typically perform.
  - Fatbikes are mountain bikes with very wide, ≈3.7 in, tires designed for riding on soft surfaces such as snow and sand.
- Military bicycles
  - Swedish military bicycles
  - Swiss army bicycles

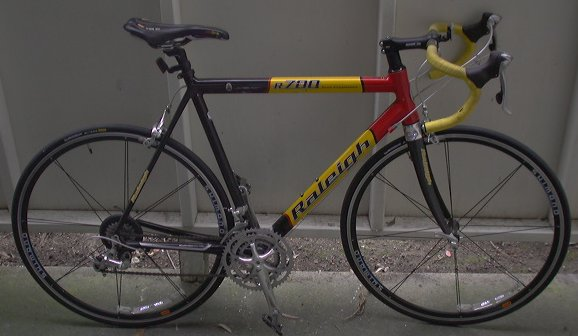
An aluminum racing bicycle made by Raleigh and built using Shimano components. It uses a semi-aerodynamic wheelset with low spoke count.

- Racing bicycles (aka road bicycles) are designed for speed and the sport of competitive road racing. They have lightweight frames and components with minimal accessories, drop handlebars to allow for a powerful and aerodynamic riding position, narrow high-pressure tires for minimal rolling resistance, and multiple gears. Racing bicycles have a relatively narrow gear range and typically vary from medium to very high ratios, distributed across 18, 20, 27, or 30 gears. The more closely spaced gear ratios allow racers to choose a gear that will enable them to ride at their optimum pedaling cadence for maximum efficiency.
- Time trial bicycles are similar to road bicycles but are differentiated by a more aggressive frame geometry that throws the rider into (i.e. "aero") riding position, sacrificing maneuverability for aerodynamics. They also feature aerodynamic frames, wheels, and handlebars.
- Triathlon bicycles have seatposts that are closer to vertical than the seatposts on road racing bicycles. This enables a greater contribution from hamstring and gluteus muscles. Triathlon bicycles also have specialized handlebars known as triathlon bars or aero bars.
- Track bicycles, intended for indoor or outdoor cycle tracks or velodromes, are exceptionally simple compared with road bikes. They have a single gear ratio, a fixed drivetrain (i.e. no freewheel), no brakes, and are minimally adorned with other components that would otherwise be typical for a racing bicycle.
- BMX bikes are designed for stunts, tricks, and racing on dirt BMX tracks. They have a single gear ratio with a freewheel and are built with smaller frames and wheels with wider, treaded tires.
- Cruiser bicycles are heavy framed bicycles designed for comfort, with curved back handlebars, padded seats, and balloon tires. They are also called beach bikes or boulevardiers and are designed for comfortable travel. Cruisers were the bicycle standard in the United States from the 1930s until the 1950s. The traditional cruiser is single-speed with coaster brakes, but modern cruisers come with three to seven speeds. Aluminum frames have recently been used in Cruiser construction, lowering weight. Cruisers typically have minimal gearing and are often available for rental at beaches and parks which feature flat terrain.
- Cycle rickshaws (also called pedicabs or trishaws) are used to transport passengers for hire.
- Motorized bicycle motorbike, cyclemotor, or vélomoteur is a bicycle with an attached motor and transmission used either to power the vehicle unassisted, or to assist with pedaling. Since it always retains both pedals and a discrete connected drive for rider-powered propulsion, the motorized bicycle is in technical terms a true bicycle, albeit a power-assisted one. However, for purposes of governmental licensing and registration requirements, the type may be legally defined as a motor vehicle, motorcycle, moped, or a separate class of hybrid vehicle. Powered by a variety of engine types and designs, the motorized bicycle formed the prototype for what would later become the motorcycle.
- A gyroscopic bicycle uses a detachable gyroscope in the front wheel to make it stable and can be easily ridden by a disabled person. The gyroscopic disk can spin several thousand times per minute and has 3 speeds, the fastest rotation for the higher corrective effect of stability.
- An electric bicycle allows the rider the choice of pedaling or 'coasting'; the bicycle being propelled by an electric motor, which is frequently incorporated into the front or rear hub. Some electric bicycles allow these two functions to be carried out simultaneously, and some motors will match the power the rider has contributed through the pedals; this type of e-bike more commonly known as a Pedelec (pedal electric). Electric bicycles primarily use lead-acid or lithium-ion batteries.
- Railbikes ride on rails.
- Firefighter bicycle

== By sport ==
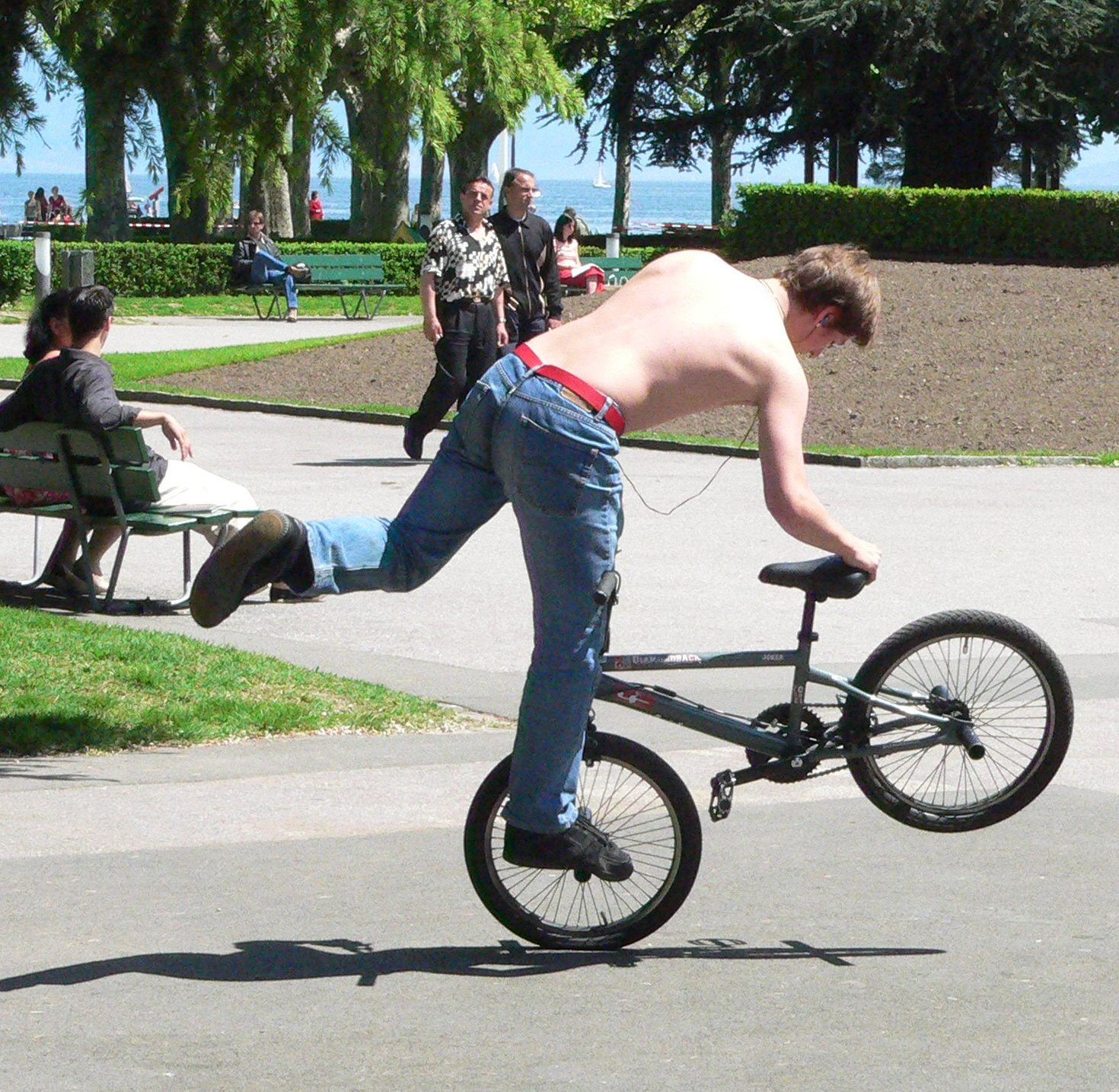
Flatland rider on a BMX bike

- Road racing bicycles
  - Time trial bicycles are road bicycles with an aerodynamic features that are not permitted when the racers ride as a group, such as aero bars and a disk rear wheel.
  - Triathlon bicycles have seatposts that are closer to vertical than the seatposts on road racing bicycles. This enables a greater contribution from hamstring and gluteus muscles. Triathlon bicycles also have specialized handlebars known as triathlon bars or aero bars.
- Track bicycles are ultra-simple, lightweight fixed-gear bikes with no brakes, designed for track cycling on purpose-built cycle tracks, often in velodromes.
  - Path Racers are an antique type of track bicycle.
- Cyclo-cross bicycles are lightweight enough to be carried over obstacles, and robust enough to be cycled through mud.
- BMX bikes (bicycle motocross) have small wheels and are used for BMX racing, as well as freestyle with tricks such as wheelies. Freestyle BMXers often ride dirt jumps and skatepark ramps, or in street-style BMXing where a rider navigates through a course of stairs and metal rails.
  - Tramp bikes are specifically converted BMX bikes that can be used on a trampoline, having everything removed except the frame, fork, seat and handlebars.
- Mountain bikes
  - Cross Country bikes (or XC bikes) are mountain bikes with a light frame, with a front or full suspension. They are designed for long courses and marathons.
  - Downhill bikes (or DH bikes) are a specialized type of mountain bike with a very strong frame, altered geometry, and long travel suspension. They are designed for use only on downhill courses.
  - Freeride (or FR) bicycles in this category usually have very strong frames and dual-suspension with travel of six inches and up. They tend to have a shorter wheelbase than downhill bikes but otherwise have very similar geometry and components. Whereas downhill racers tend towards strong and light components, extreme freeriders tend not to worry about weight as much as strength of materials so it can withstand the huge drops and gaps that they typically perform.
  - Enduro bicycles are a middle category between Downhill and Cross Country bicycles. This type of bicycle usually has a strong but lighter frame, and dual-suspension with travel between four and seven inches.
  - Trials bicycles designed for trials riding, often without regard for attaching a seat.
  - Exercise bikes, spinning bikes, or exercycles are devices used as exercise equipment for indoor cycling. It includes a saddle, pedals, and some form of handlebars arranged as on a (stationary) bicycle. A stationary bicycle is usually a special-purpose exercise machine resembling a bicycle without wheels. It is also possible to adapt an ordinary bicycle for stationary exercise by placing it on bicycle rollers or a trainer. Rollers and trainers are often used by racing cyclists to warm up before racing, or to train on their own machines indoors.
- Artistic cycling bikes are used to perform tricks (called exercises) for points in a format similar to ballet or gymnastics.

== By frame design ==
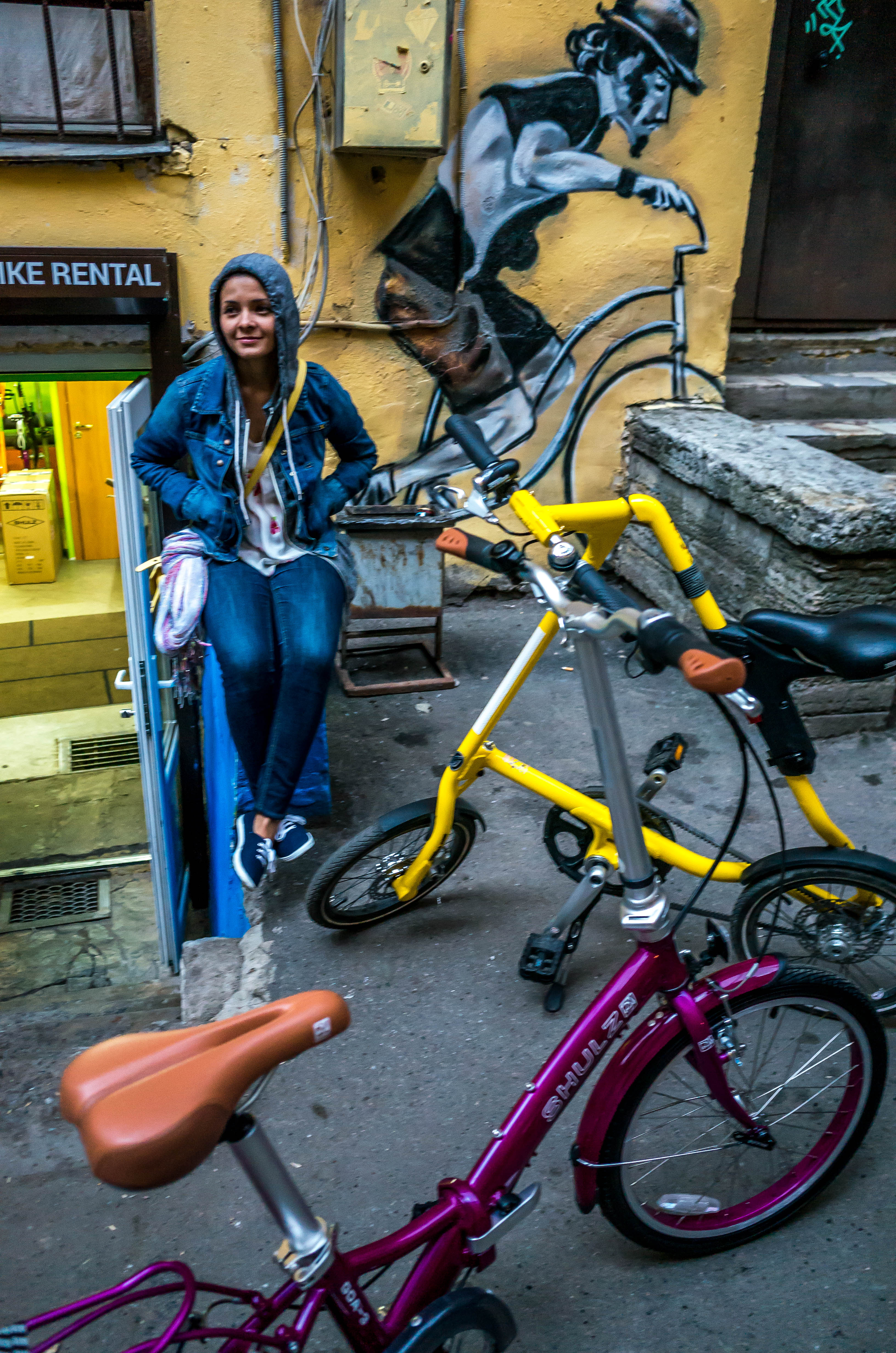
Strida folding frame bicycle in yellow

- An old-fashioned penny-farthing or ordinary has one high wheel directly driven by the pedals and one small wheel.
- A dwarf bicycle has a chain-driven front wheel, exemplified by the Kangaroo.
- On an upright bicycle, also called a safety bicycle, the rider sits astride the saddle.
- On a recumbent bicycle the rider reclines or lies supine. Recumbent bicycles (also 'bents) are designed to maximise comfort and minimise wind resistance, because the rider in a supine or semi-supine position. Whereas most of the other types of bicycle in this section are designed around a 'diamond frame' geometry, where the pedals and chainset are located at the bottom of the bicycle and handlebars are at the front, recumbent bicycles (recumbents) generally use a "boom" and rear triangle combination with the pedals and chainset located at the front of the boom and the handlebars are located either "over seat" or "underseat" in the center.
- On a prone bike the rider lies in a prone position.
- A crank forward bicycle has the rider upright with the pedals far enough forward that the rider can reach the ground with his or her feet without getting off the saddle.
- A Pedersen bicycle has a bridge truss frame.
- A folding bicycle can be quickly folded for easy carrying, for example on public transport.
- A small wheel bicycle, such as a Moulton Bicycle, has a traditional seating position and small wheels.
- A portable bicycle, such as a Strida, is a folding bicycle that is small and light enough to be easily carried afoot or in a cramped vehicle.
- An exercise bicycle remains stationary; it is used for exercise rather than propulsion.
- A step-through frame is a type of bicycle frame, often used for utility bicycles, with a low or absent top tube or cross-bar
- A push bike is a form of bicycle without pedals such as the drais 1820 which is one of the first verifiable push bikes.

== By material ==
- A bamboo bicycle has a frame made of bamboo.
- A cardboard bicycle is made of cardboard.
- A lugged steel bicycle has a frame made of steel.
- An aluminium bicycle has a frame made of aluminium alloys.
- A plastic bicycle was an attempt in the early 1980s to introduce a bicycle made entirely out of plastic materials instead of metal.
- A wooden bicycle has a frame made out of wood. One example is the Chukudu used in the east of the Democratic Republic of Congo.
- A carbon bicycle is made of carbon fiber.
- A titanium bicycle has a frame made of titanium.

== By rider position ==
- Upright bicycle
  - Crank forward
- Recumbent bicycle
- Prone bike
- Sideways bike

== By number of riders ==
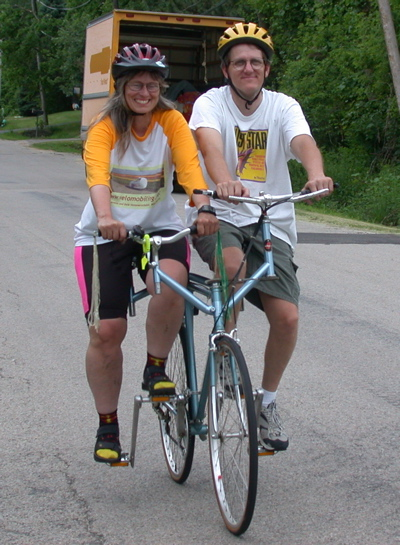
Two people riding a Sociable

- Most bicycles are designed for a single rider
- Bikes with child seats or single-child trailers can carry an adult and a child
- Bikes with double child trailers can carry an adult and two children
- A Sociable has two riders side by side.
- A tandem or twin has two or more riders behind each other.
- A triplet has three riders; a quadruplet has four.
- Some bicycles carry more riders: for example, the Conference Bike carries seven, the Busycle carries fifteen, and party bikes can carry up to 17 people.
- The largest multi-bike had 40 riders.

In most of these types the riders ride one behind the other (referred to as tandem seating). Exceptions are "The Companion", or "Sociable," a side-by-side two-person bike (that converted to a single-rider) built by the Punnett Cycle Mfg. Co. in Rochester, N.Y. in the 1890s. On the Conference Bike, riders sit in a circle facing each other. On the Busycle, the captain faces forwards, one row of stokers faces left, and one row faces right.

== By number of wheels ==
While not strictly bicycles, these devices share many features such as drivetrains and other components with bicycles.

- Hydrocycles have no wheels, but they use bicycle cranks, and pedals. Some use bicycle chains and sprockets.
- Unicycles have only one wheel, and they use bicycle wheels, tires, cranks, and pedals. Some use bicycle chains and sprockets.
- Tricycles have three wheels.
  - Velomobiles have three wheels and are enclosed for aerodynamic advantage and protection from weather and collisions.
  - Cycle rickshaws (also called pedicabs or trishaws) have three wheels and are used to transport passengers for hire.
- Quadracycles have four wheels.
  - Conference Bikes and party bikes have four wheels.

== By type of steering ==
- Two-wheel steering
  - Sideways bike
  - Swingbike
- Rear-wheel steering
- Center steering
- Reverse steering

In addition to number and placement, the particular steering can be of the type:

- Fork-steering, conventional bicycle and motorcycle steering
- Hub-center steering, used on some motorcycles
- Duplex steering, also used on some historical motorcycles
- Steering knuckle, like in modern cars

Commonly the steering wheel is directly steered, for example via a handlebar. On some cycles the steering instead is indirectly steered, like on front-loading cargo bikes where the front wheel for example can be connected to the handlebar via linkage arm(s), cable steering or hydraulic steering.

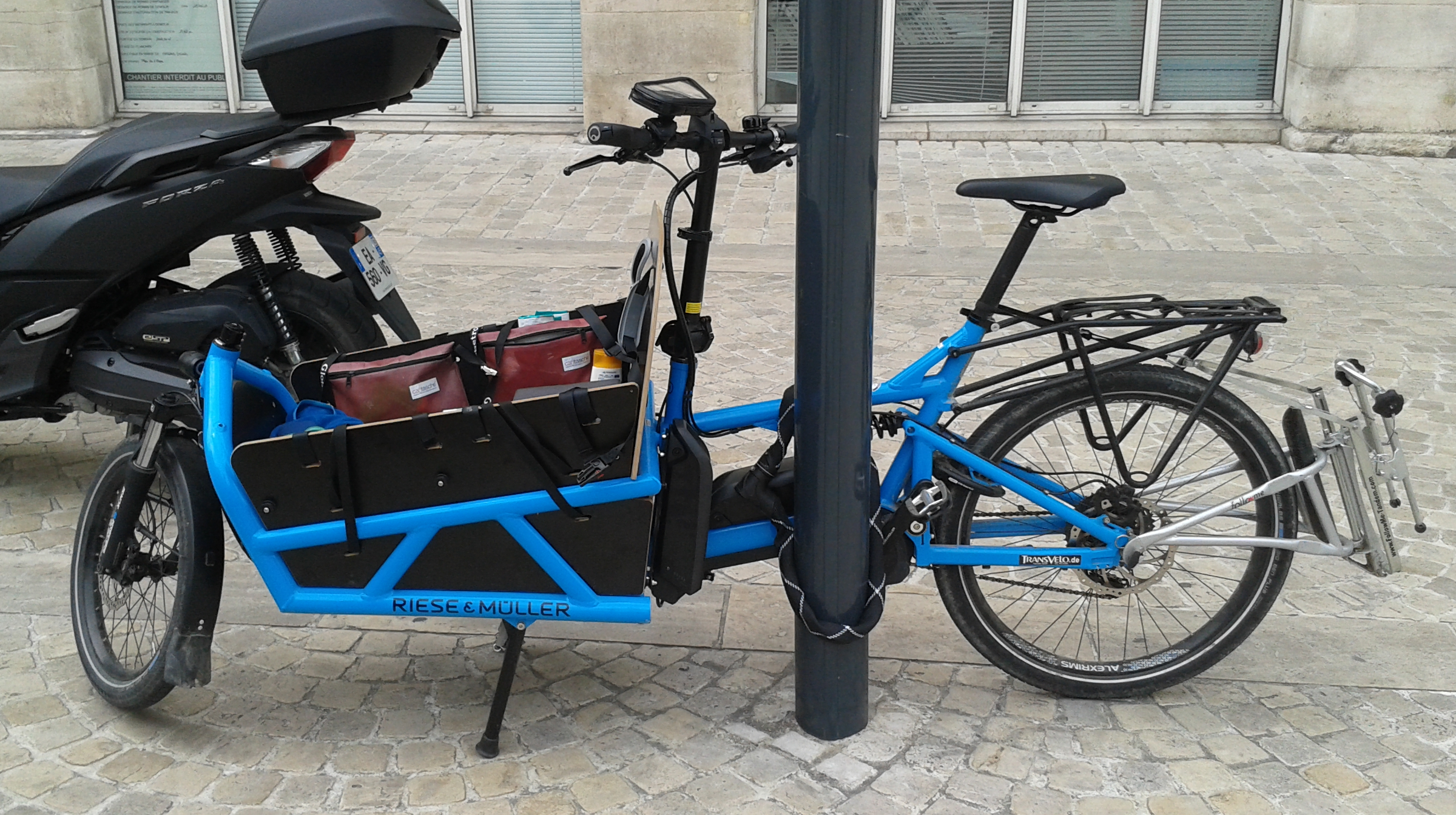
Modern electric front loader cargo bike with conventional fork-steering (2018)

Kettler cargo bike with hub-center steering

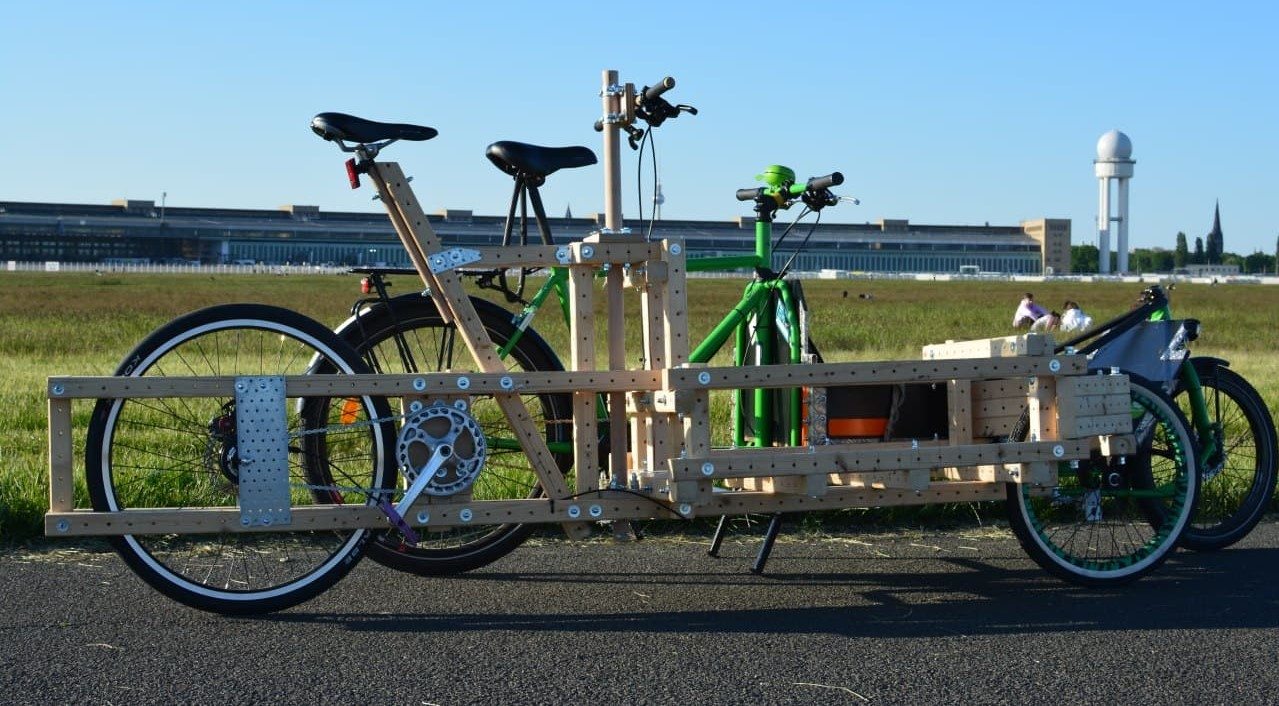
Gridbeam cargo bike with duplex steering

Bastiaen cargo bike with steering knuckle

== By means of propulsion ==
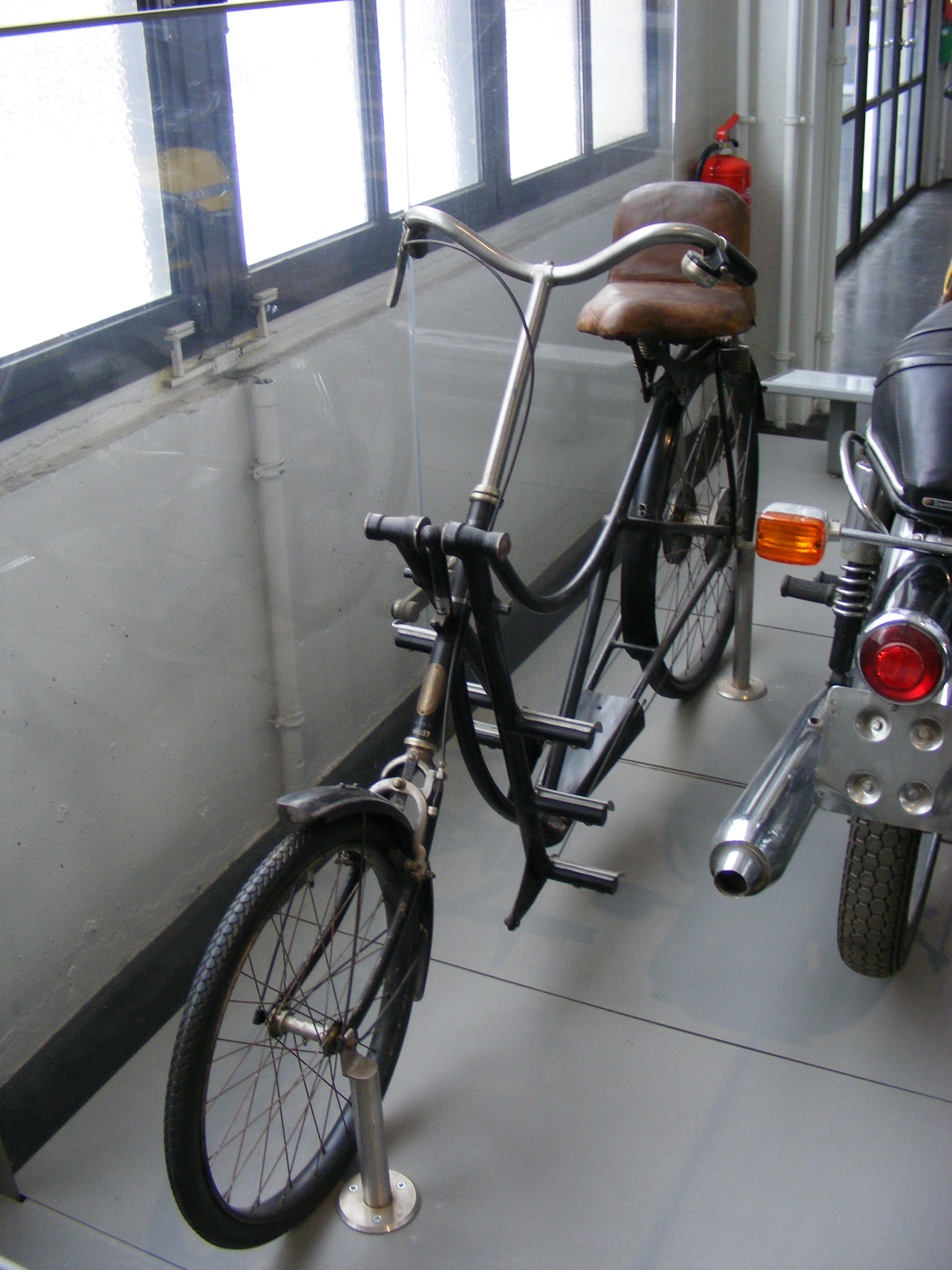
A treadle bicycle from 1925

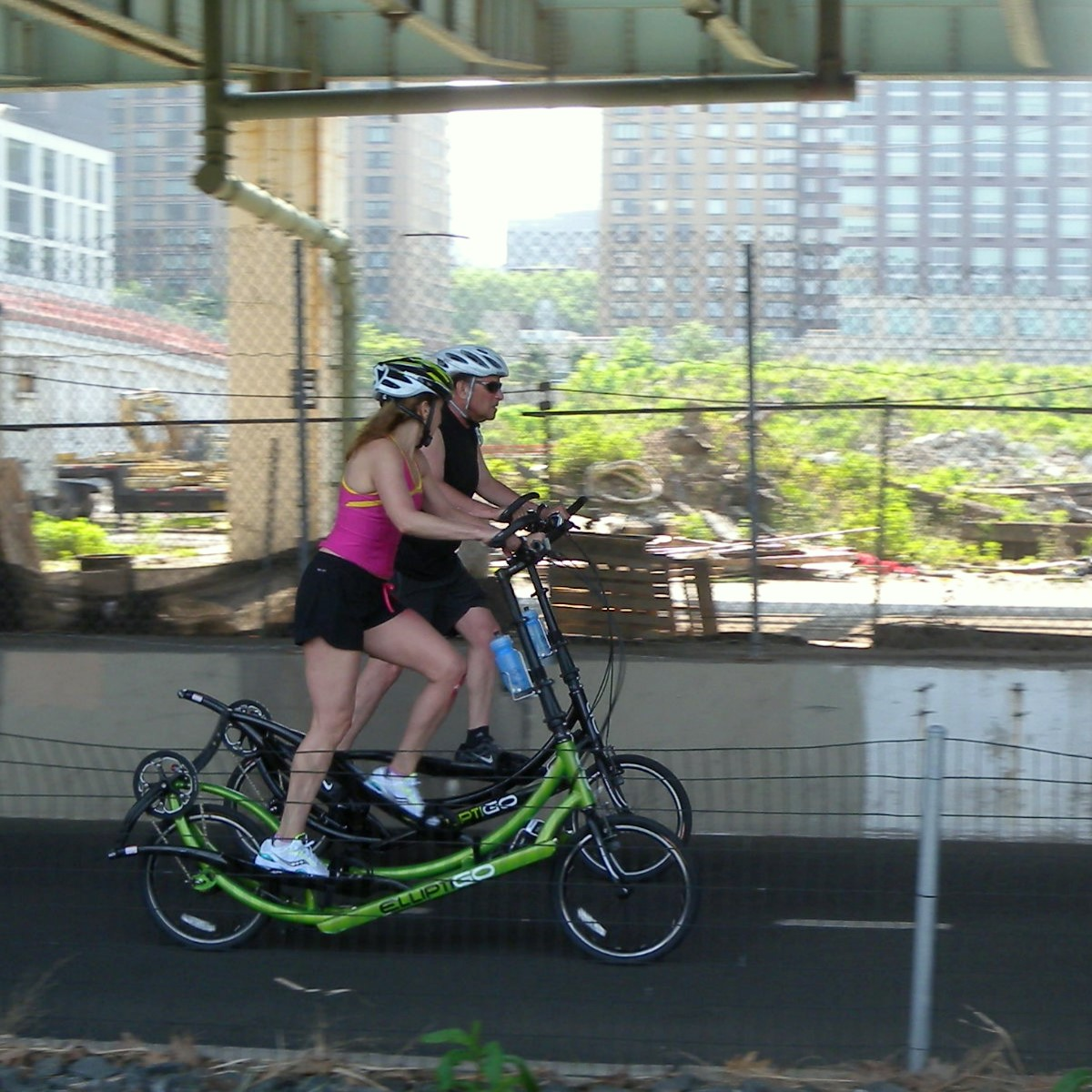
ElliptiGO users stand up on a seatless treadle bicycle

- A human-powered transport uses only human power
  - A pedal cycle, commonly known as a bicycle is driven by legs and feet on pedals.
  - A hand-cranked bicycle or handcycle is driven by arms and hands.
  - A rowing cycle is driven by a rowing action using both arms and legs.
  - A treadle bicycle is driven by a reciprocating, not rotary, motion of the feet.
  - A treadmill bicycle.
  - A bucking bike (with one or more eccentric wheels)
  - A balance bicycle (a kind of velocipede) and a Footbike use Flintstone power, as the rider pushes themselves along with one or both feet on the ground.
  - A caster board or a Trikke is driven forward by pushing a wheel approximately perpendicular to the direction of travel.
- An amphibious bicycle has paddles and wheels to facilitate operation on both land and water.
- A motorized bicycle provides motor assistance. (Not to be confused with motorcycles or electric motorcycles and scooters.)
  - An electric bicycle, also called an e-bike, is primarily propelled by the rider, but with assistance provided by an electric motor; usually located in the hub of the front or rear wheel. The electric motor is powered by a battery which is secured to the frame. These are available in various technologies including lead acid, nickel cadmium, nickel metal hydride, lithium ion and lithium polymer. Many of these are not classed as a motor vehicle, but as a bicycle if they comply with UK and European regulations.
  - A moped propels the rider with a motor, but it usually includes bicycle pedals for human propulsion.
- Wind
  - Whike
- A 2WD or AWD bike sends power to both the front and rear wheels for increased traction. The wheels can be driven via belt, chain or shaft and can be powered by human, electricity, fossil fuel or a combination of the three. Sometimes for electric bikes this referred to as dual motor or twin drive.

=== By gearing ===
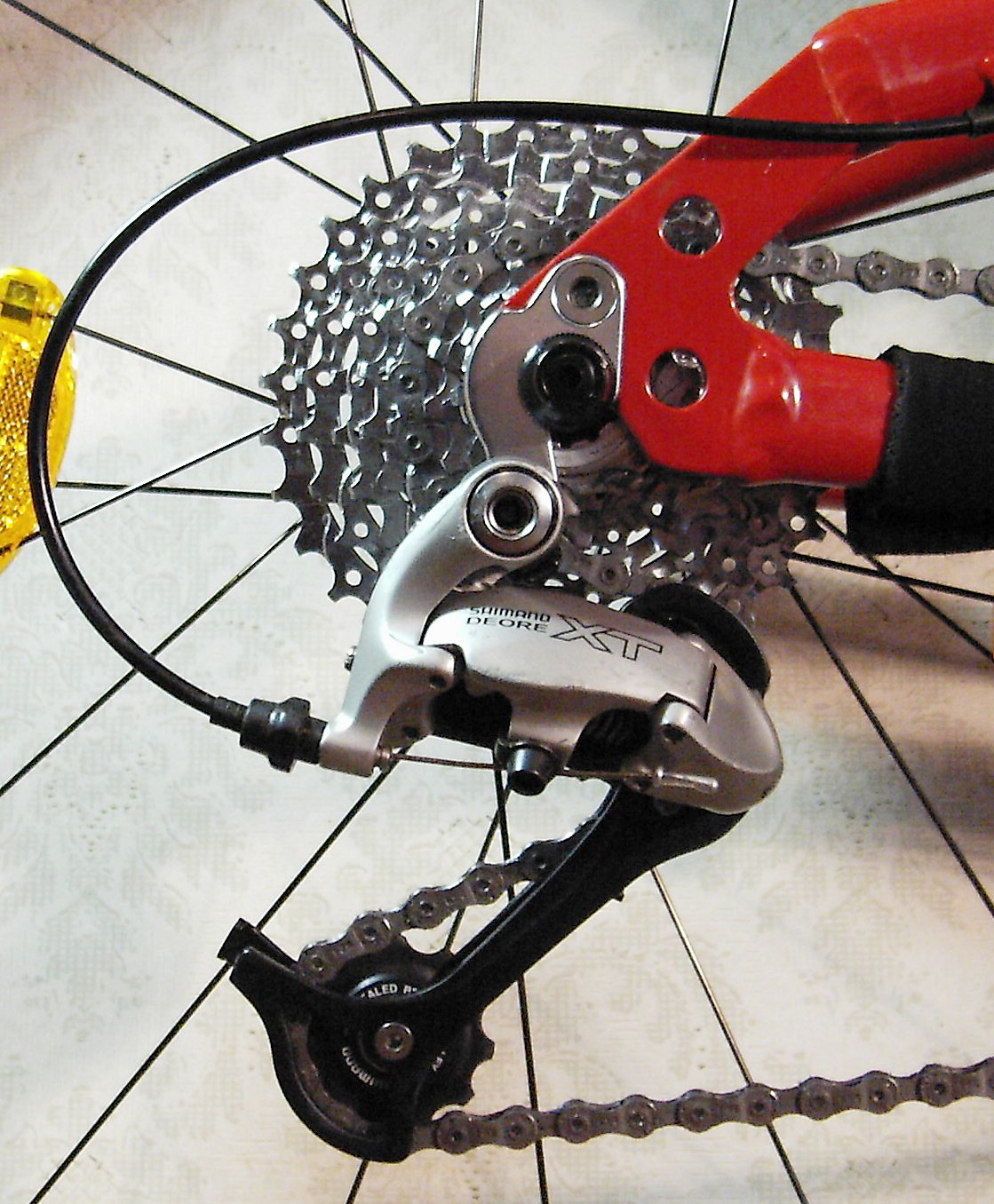
Shimano XT rear derailleur on a mountain bike

The majority of bicycles transmit power from the crankset to the drive wheel with a bicycle chain

- Derailleur gears, featured on most racing and touring bicycles, offering from 5 to 30 speeds
- Single-speed bicycles and fixed-gear bicycles have only one gear, and include all BMX bikes, many children's bikes, city messenger bikes, and many others. The fixed gear has no freewheel mechanism, so whenever the bike is in motion the pedals continue to spin. The pedals can, or sometimes must, be used to slow down.
- Internal hub gearing is most common in European utility bicycles, usually ranging from three-speeds to eight speeds, however hub gears with fourteen (Rohloff-drive) or eighteen (Pinion-drive) speeds are also available.
- Retro-Direct bicycles have two sprockets on the rear wheel. By back-pedalling, the secondary, usually lower, gear is engaged.
- Chainless bicycles, either shaft-driven bicycles or belt-driven bicycles use a driveshaft or a belt-drive, respectively, rather than a chain to power the rear wheel. These are often used as commuter bikes because they eliminate inconveniences associated with chains and pant-legs, but shaft-driven bicycles are less efficient than chain-driven bicycles. Chainless bicycles are either single-speed, or employ internal hub gearing.
  - Hydraulic bicycle (and pneumatic bicycle) use a fluid.
  - Some rowed bikes use a cable or a linkage.
  - Stringbike uses a wire rope and pulley drive system.

== By style ==
Some bicycles are defined by their appearance.

- Art bikes are built so that the frame appears to be made of junk or found objects: Bongo the Clown built several ridable parade bikes which were as much kinetic sculptures as transport.
  - Dekocharis are a form of art bike indigenous to Japan dating back to the mid-1970s.
  - Lowrider bicycles are highly customized bikes with a long wheelbase and styling inspired by lowrider cars.
  - Scraper bikes are ordinary bicycles that have been modified by their owners, typically with decorated spokes with candy-colored pinwheels and matching body and wheel colors, using tinfoil, re-used cardboard, candy wrappers and paint.
- Chopper bicycles are highly customized bicycles whose design, construction and style is similar to that of chopper-style motorcycles.
- Huck bikes or Extreme Freeride bicycles are highly customized bicycles whose design, construction and style is similar to that of motocross-style motorcycles. With an heavily reinforced frame, with very long travel suspensions (more than 200 mm / 8″ in the front fork, and rear suspension), large tires (more than 2.5″ x 26″ or 24″).

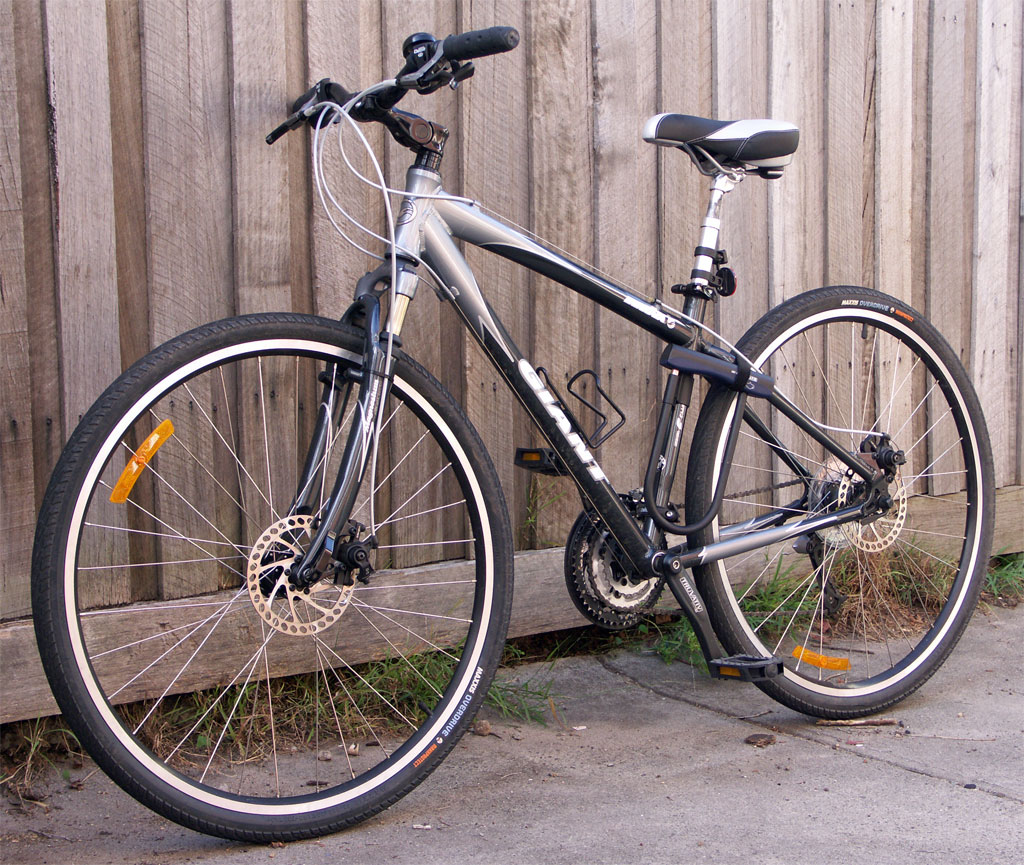
The 2005 Giant Innova is an example of a hybrid bicycle. It has 27 speeds and disc brakes for wet-weather riding.

- Clown bicycles are designed for comedic effect or stunt riding. Some types of clown bicycles are:
  - Bucking bike (with one or more eccentric wheels)
  - Tall bike (often called an upside down bike, constructed so that the pedals, seat and handlebars are all higher than normal)—other types of tall bikes are made by welding two or more bicycle frames on top of each other, and running additional chains from the pedals to the rear wheel.
  - Come-apart bike, (essentially a unicycle, plus a set of handlebars attached to forks and a wheel).
  - Reverse-steering bike, in which rotation of the handlebars is transmitted to the front wheel through a pair of interlocking cogs, so that turning to the left steers the bike to the right.
  - Sideways bikes are bikes ridden sideways with the rider steering both wheels.
  - Clown bikes are also built that are directly geared, with no freewheeling, so that they may be pedaled backwards. Some are built very small but are otherwise normal.
- Wheelie bikes are a type of stylized children's bicycle designed in the 1960s to resemble a chopper motorcycle.

== See also ==
- Autonomous bicycle
- Glossary of cycling
- List of bicycle parts
- Outline of cycling
- List of bicycle brands and manufacturing companies
