= List of bicycles =

List of bicycles may refer to:

- List of bicycle types
- List of bicycle brands and manufacturing companies

== See also ==
- Outline of cycling
