= Clown bicycle =

Type of bicycle

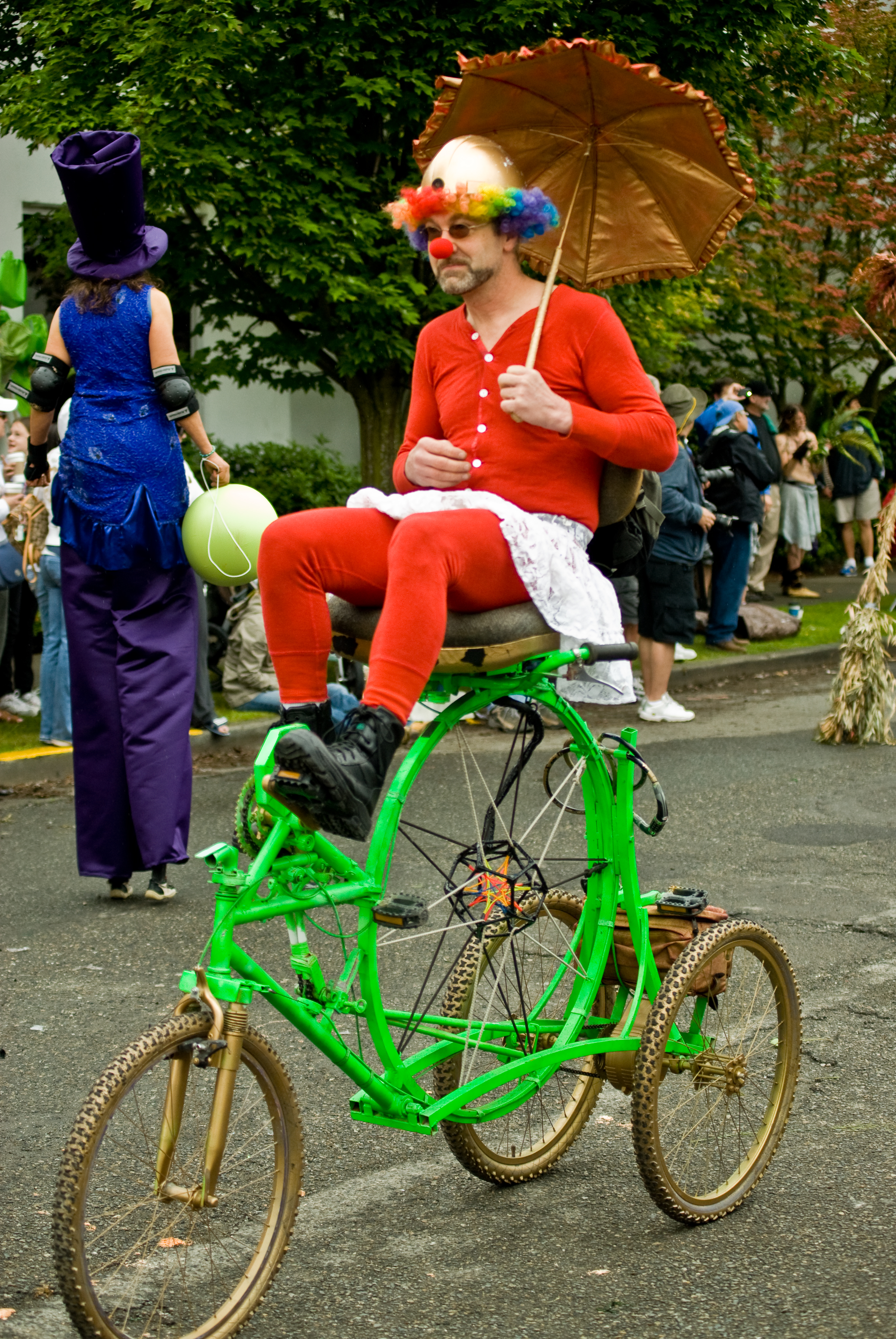
A clown on a tall trike, similar to a tall bike.

A clown bicycle, freak bike, or circus bike is a bicycle designed for comedic visual effect or stunt riding, often used by circus clowns.

== Types ==
Clown bicycle types include the BMX bicycle, come-apart bike, or breakaway bike (essentially a unicycle, plus a set of handlebars attached to forks and a wheel), high-wire cycle (a bicycle pedaled along a thin wire), small wheel bicycle, tall bike, miniature bike, swing bike, and sideways bike. Some clown bikes are fixed-gear bikes with no freewheeling, so that they may be pedaled either forwards or backwards. Some are built very small but are otherwise conventional.

== History ==
Soon after its invention in the 19th century, the bicycle was incorporated into the circus repertoire. Bicycle acts were initially performed by groups, whose members drew inspiration from equestrian performances and hippodrama. Over time, the art form developed into more individual performances.

=== Notable early performers ===
Notable early performers include:

- Harry French
- Nick Kaufmann
- Dan Canary
- Lilly Yokoi, bicycle acrobat who performed on a gold-plated bicycle
- Joe Jackson Sr.
- Jack Natirboff, "The Bicycle Clown"
- Baraka Jima Fermouz, Tanzanian clown bicycle performer whose act included tall bikes or "giraffes", as well as miniature bikes
- Serge Huercio, BMX performer who trained at the Centre National des Arts du Cirque in Châlons-en-Champagne

== See also ==
- List of bicycle types
- Art bike
- Clown car
