= Icetrack cycling =

Bicycle racing sport

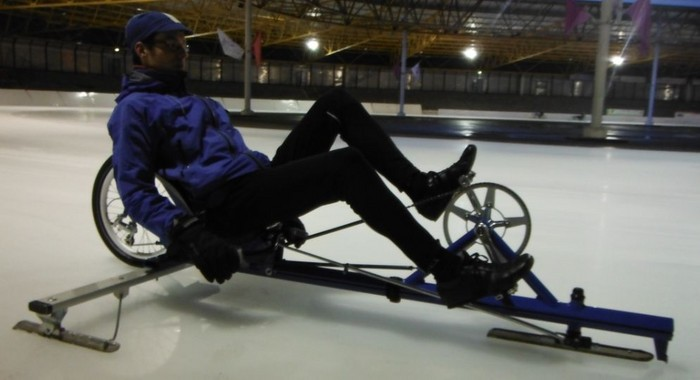
Icetrack bike

Icetrack cycling is a bicycle racing sport usually held on 400 m speed skating ice ovals. However, any ice sheet can be used, including ice hockey rinks and frozen lakes.

== History ==
The sport of cycling on ice is probably as old as the sport of cycling. Icetrack cycling has many similarities to track cycling. There are many examples of bikes that have been built or adapted to cope with the hard and slippery surface of ice. Usually practiced in places where a winter freeze turns lakes into inviting sheets of ice, annual events attract all types of ice bikes and competitors. Various ice rinks also host (annual) events. In the Netherlands, icetrack cycling is developing rapidly due to the availability of standard ice bikes, making the sport more accessible. The term icetrack is specifically used for cycling on ice suitable for skating on (i.e., not on snow or rough ice).

== Equipment ==
Many types of bike have been tried over the years. The current standard bikes use one drive wheel at the back, a steering skate at the front and a cornering skate out to the right.

The drive wheel is a 20″ bicycle wheel with derailleur gears. Various tyres can be selected to suit the ice surface. Spikes are not used on a 400 m ice oval.

The steering skate is ground to a profile which ensures the bike turns when the skate is turned - the skate being attached to handlebars operated by the user.

The cornering skate provides the force needed to get the bike round the left hand corners at either end of the ice oval.

The user sits in a recumbent position to ensure a low centre of gravity on the slippery ice.

== Race formats ==
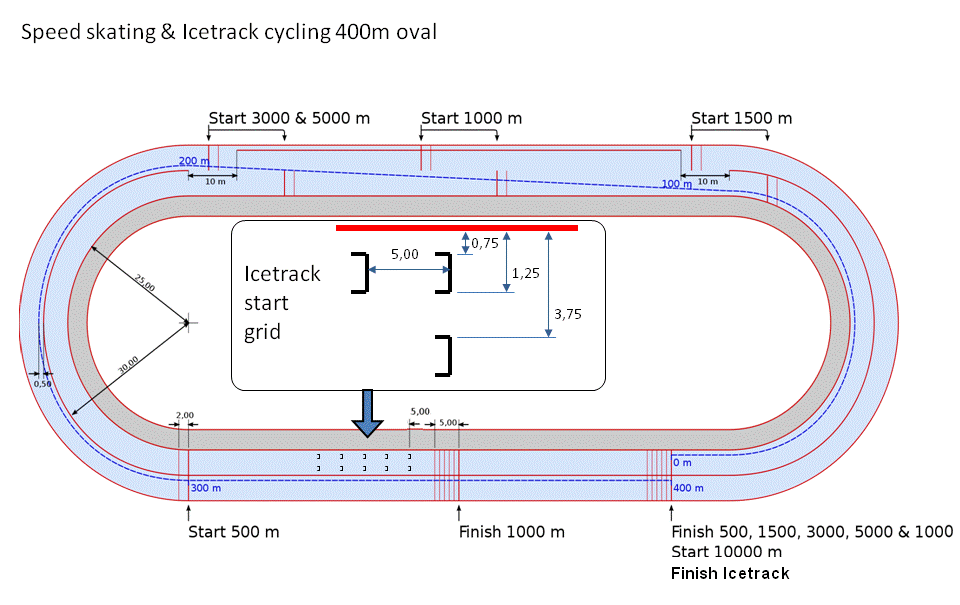
IceTrack Cycling standard 400m oval markings

Icetrack cycling events fit into two broad categories: timed/individual races and multiple bike races.

Timed races use the same format as speed skating events. Various distances between 500 m and 10,000 m are completed against the clock, with a maximum of two competitors on the ice at any one time. Many ice ovals include a wire loop embedded in the ice along the finish line which can detect the passing of a transponder attached to the competitor, thus providing automated timing (often linked to the internet).

Multiple bike races of up to 20 bikes use a standing start from a grid with races held over three, five or nine laps. The position on the start grid is decided based on a timed qualifying flying lap.

Keirin. The bikes are also used to start a Keirin race for speed skating (replacing the Derny in a velodrome). In a keirin for skaters, the bike starts on the opposite side of the oval and the skaters then start from a standing start as the bike passes them. The bike then regulates the speed, which increases over two laps, before slowing and moving to the left. The skaters then sprint the last lap to the finish. Any number of skaters between six and 16 can take part in a race, depending on the local club. Championship races have eight competitors.

== Track records ==
The current record for one flying lap of a 400 m ice oval stands at 33.18 s, set on 11 December 2015 in De Bonte Wever Assen NL

The ice track hour record stands at 35.258 km, set by Eva Navratilova (CZE) on 14 November 2015 in Thialf (Heerenveen, NL). This record is recognised by the WHPVA.

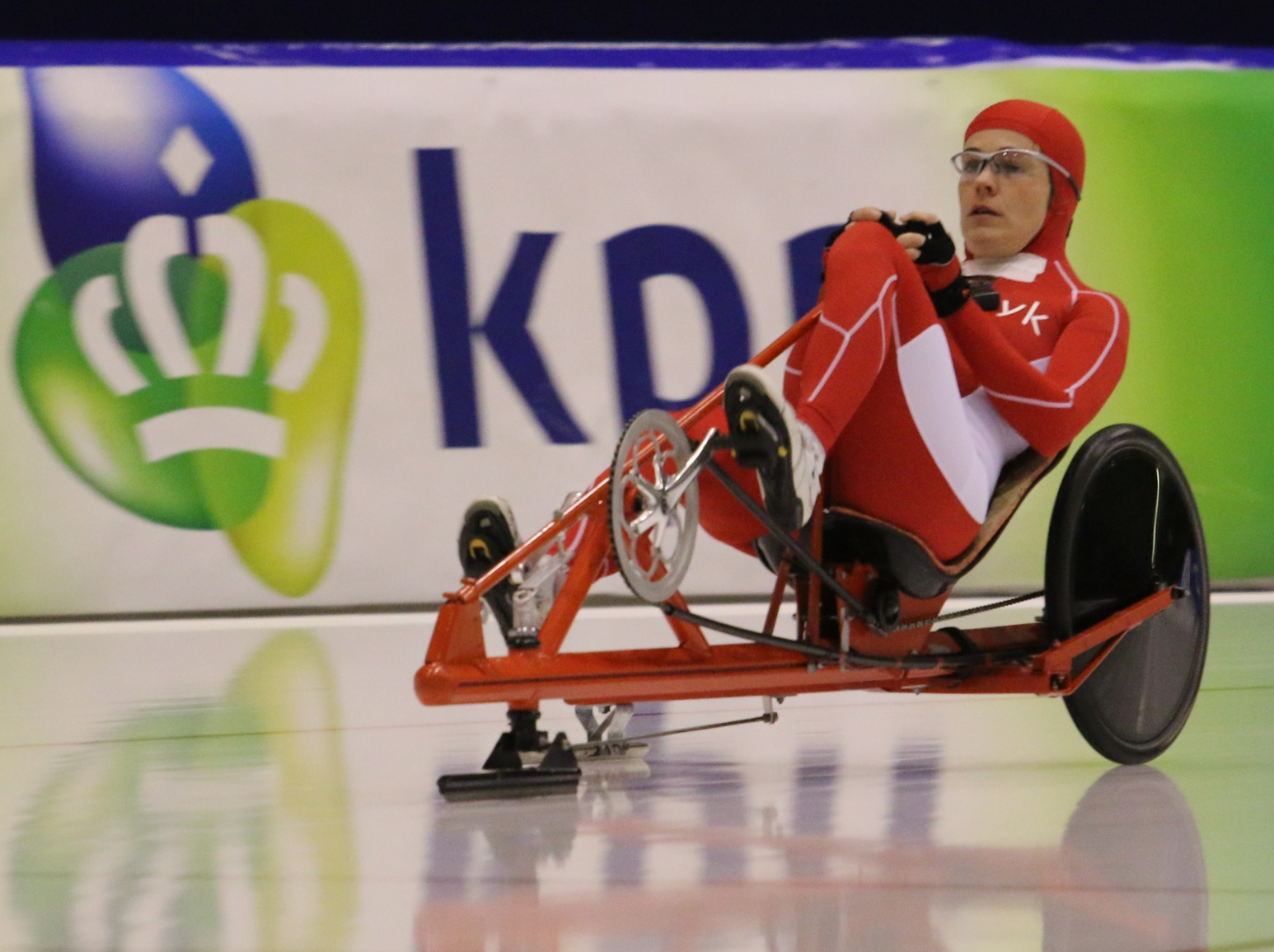
Eva Navratilova

== See also ==
- Ice cycle
- Outline of cycling
- Speed Skating
- Velodrome
