= Clown car =

Circus routine

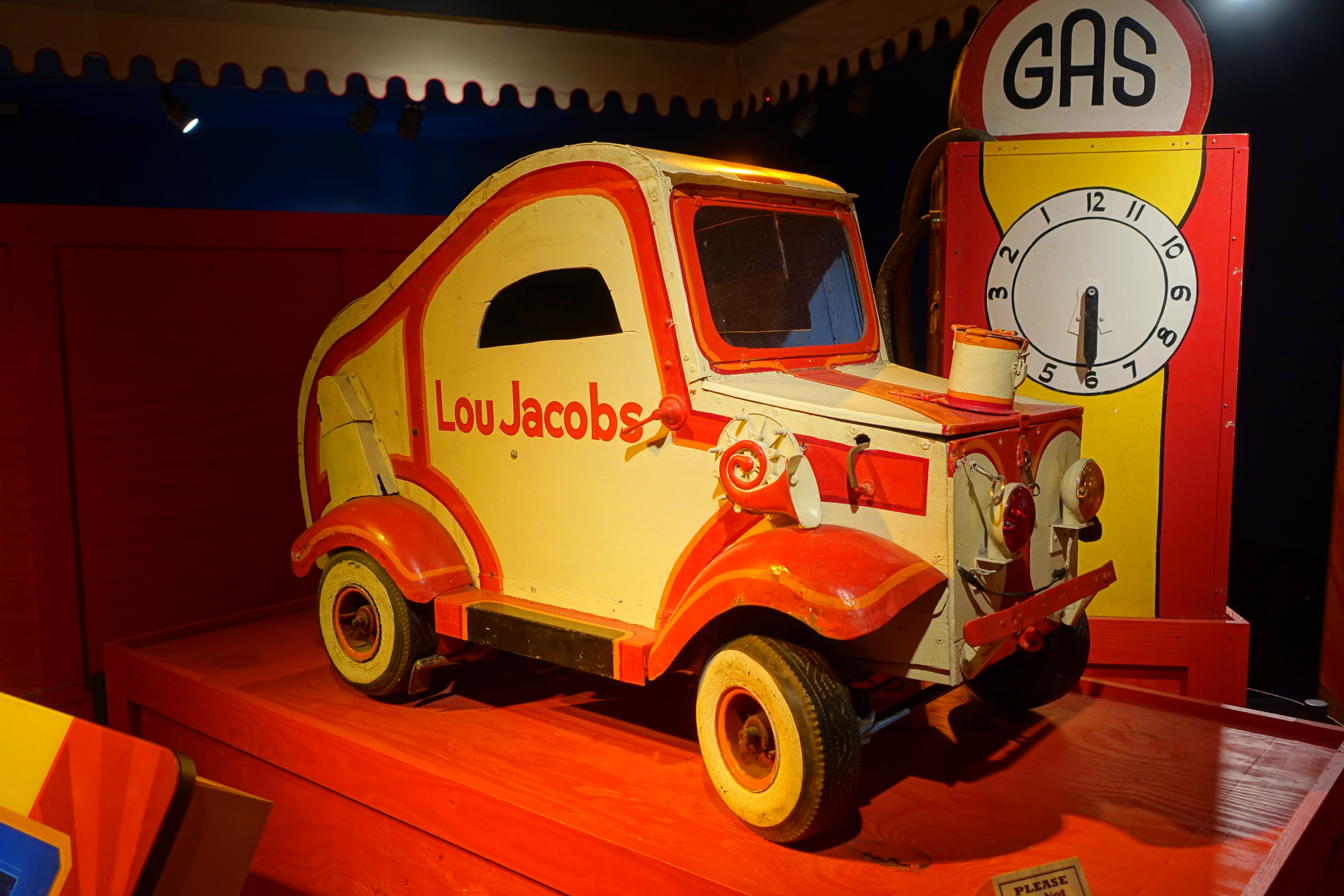
Lou Jacobs miniature clown car (1951–1952) with gas pump

A clown car is a prop in a common circus clown routine, which involves a large number of clowns emerging from a small car. The first performance of this routine was in the Cole Bros. Circus during the 1950s. The effect is usually produced by removing all of a car's internal components like door panels, headliners, engines, seats, and any interior barrier to the trunk, and then filling the enlarged space with as many clowns as possible. Greg DeSanto of the International Clown Hall of Fame estimates that somewhere between 14 and 21 clowns and their props could fit into a car prepared in this manner.

== See also ==
- Clown bicycle
