= Tramp bike =

A tramp bike is a specifically converted BMX bike that can be used on a trampoline. In most cases the bike will have everything removed leaving only the frame, fork, seat and handlebars. This means that the wheels, chain, pedals, cranks, and bearings of a conventional bike are not required. Padding is wrapped and secured with tape around anything sharp that is likely to damage the trampoline. The bike is used to practice difficult tricks as performed during freestyle BMX and freestyle motocross.

It is a safe and affordable way to learn how to do bike tricks. There is little chance of damage to the trampoline if the bike is covered; accordingly a net/mesh cage is strongly recommended for safety. There are few more possible risks with tramp bike which must be considered and take care of during Tramp Bike Game.
