= Prone bicycle =

Bicycle type

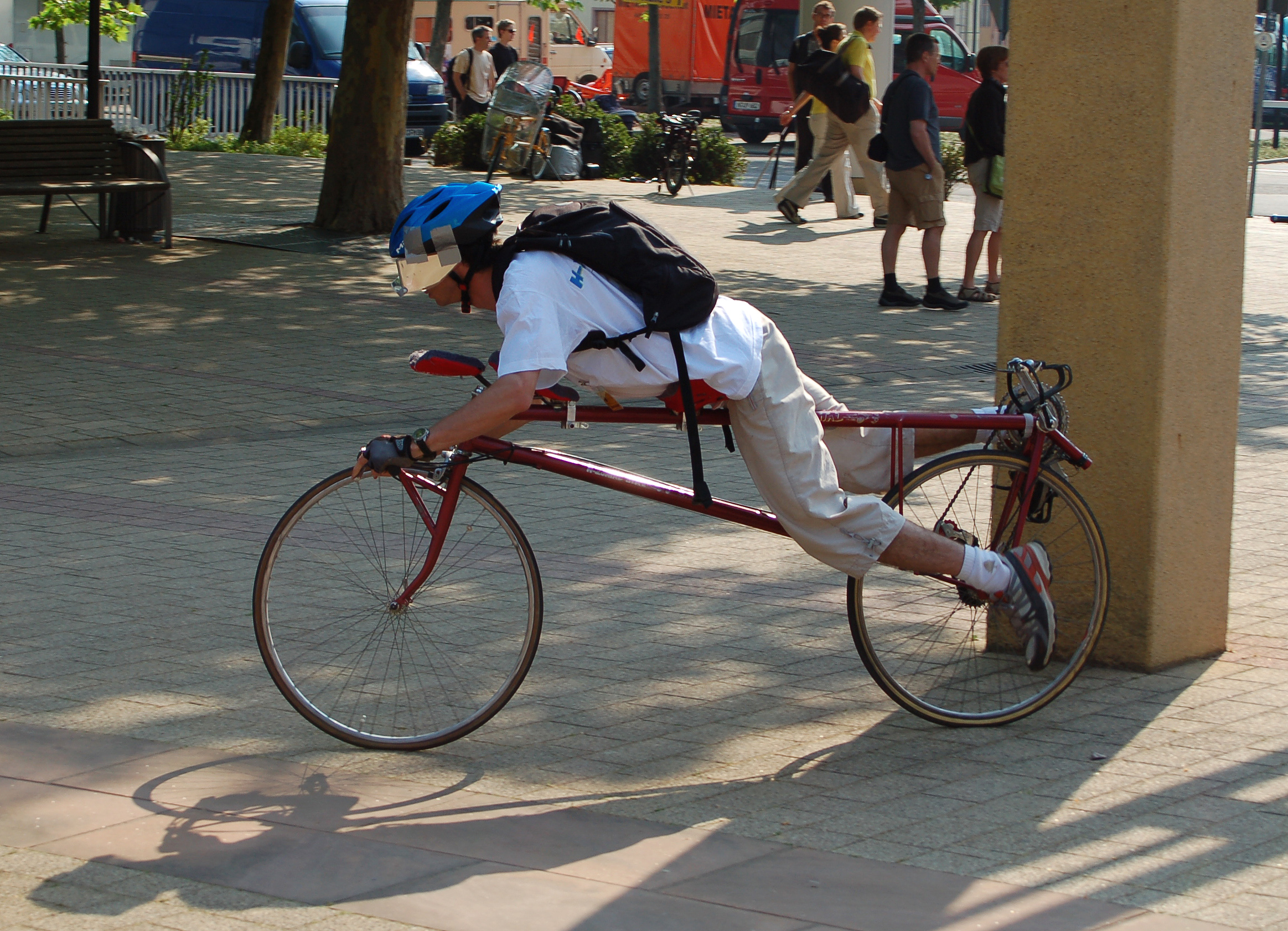
Prone bicycle

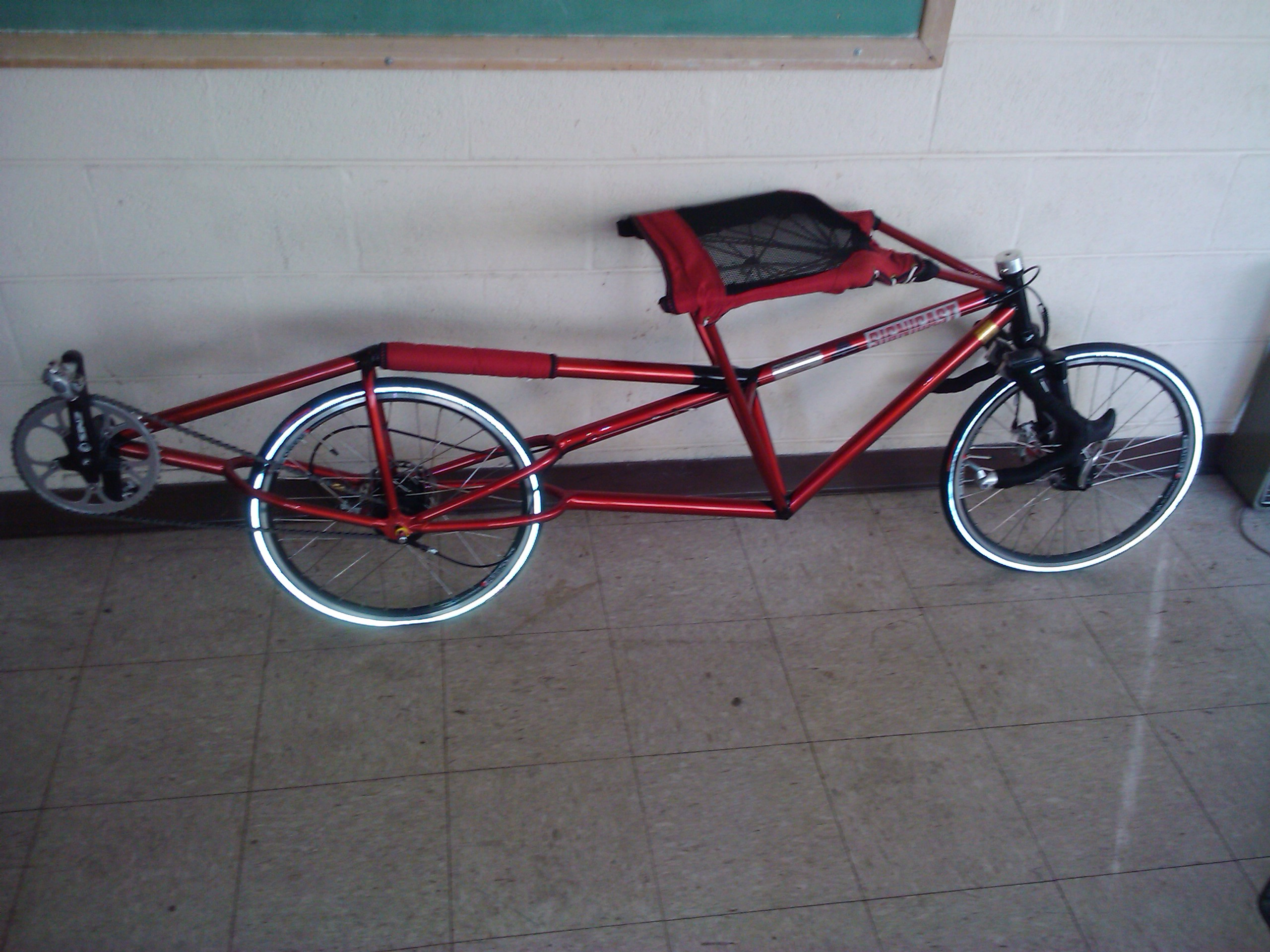
Prone bicycle built by students at MSOE

A prone bicycle is a bicycle which places the rider in a prone position. The bottom bracket is located at the bicycle's rear; the rider lies either on a pad or in a hard-shell seat. The prone position of the rider's body can reduce aerodynamic drag and therefore increase the efficiency of the vehicle.

The first prone bicycle was developed and marketed by the American company Darling in 1897, but most prone bicycles are do-it-yourself constructions. There are few series-production models.

In May, 2012, Graeme Obree announced that the bike he was building for his attempt at setting the human-powered vehicle land speed record is a prone bike. The attempt was originally to take place in Britain and the current record speed is 133.3 km/h (82.8 mph). However, he competed in the 2013 World Human Powered Speed Championships in Battle Mountain, Nevada, where the current record was also set. He achieved a speed of 91.12 km/h (56.62 mph) on September 12, 2013.

== See also ==
- Outline of cycling
- Recumbent bicycle
