= Swing Bike =

Bicycle where both front and rear wheels are steerable

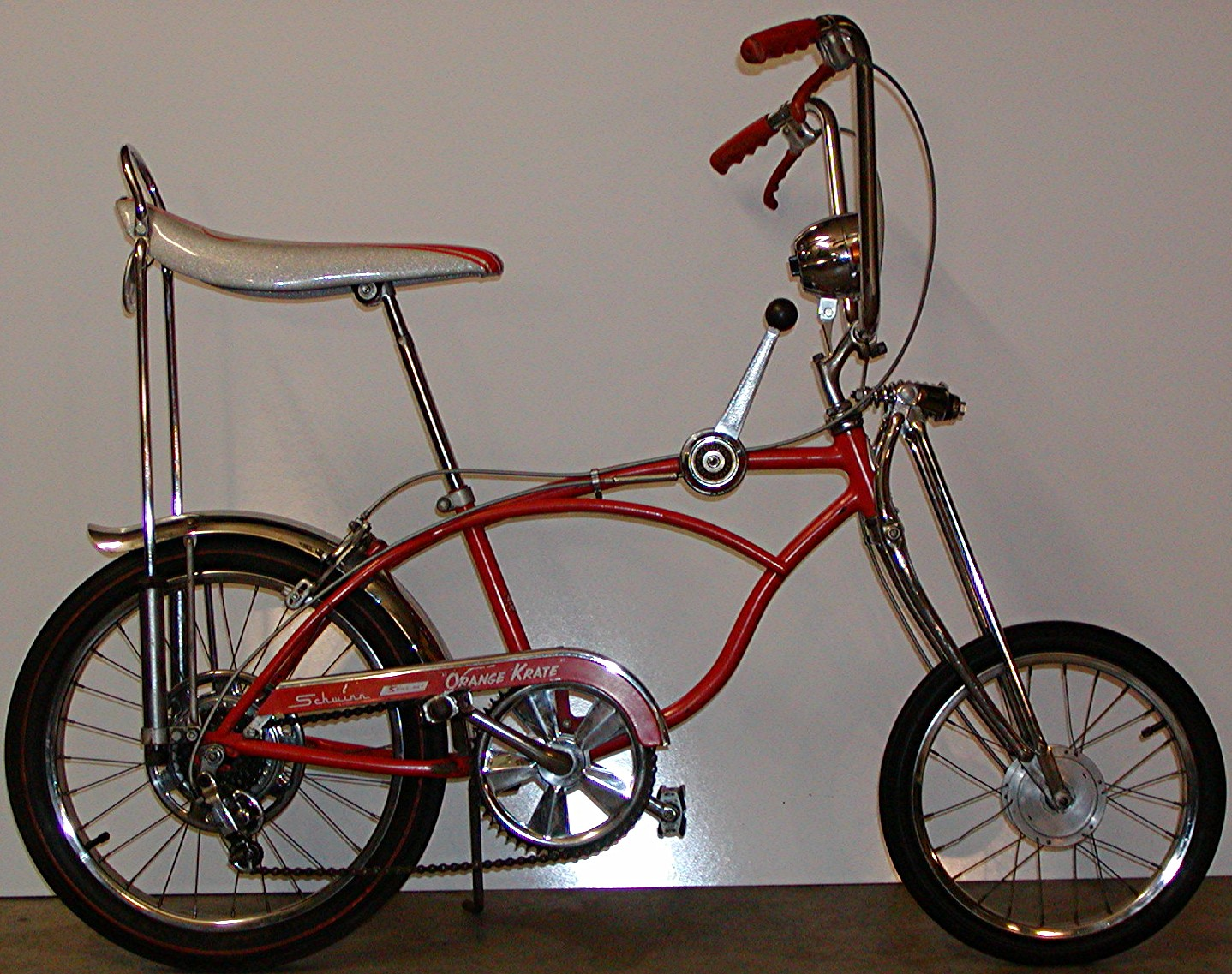
A 1968 Schwinn Stingray bike. Early production swing bikes looked similar to this but with a second pivot point under the seat.

The Swing Bike is a brand of bicycle which allowed for steering at both the front wheel and the rear wheel. The design was patented by Ralph Belden in 1974, brought to market in 1975, and discontinued by 1978.

A swingbike or swing bike (common noun) has been genericized to come to mean any bike with a second steering axis in front of the saddle. A new bicycle by the same name was launched by Americas Bike Co. in San Diego, California. Production may have paused or ended in 2024.

The original Swing Bike was in the wheelie bike style, and the Swing Bike company also offered a normally-steered BMX bike in 1977. An early working name for the Swing Bike was Pivicycle.

A swing bike can be made fairly easily by someone who knows how to weld. Various bicycle shops or crews have built their own for fun. Often the rear steering is a similar or identical construction to the head tube steering.

The generic term for a bike that looks and functions significantly different than a standard bicycle is clown bicycle or freak bike, usually used endearingly.

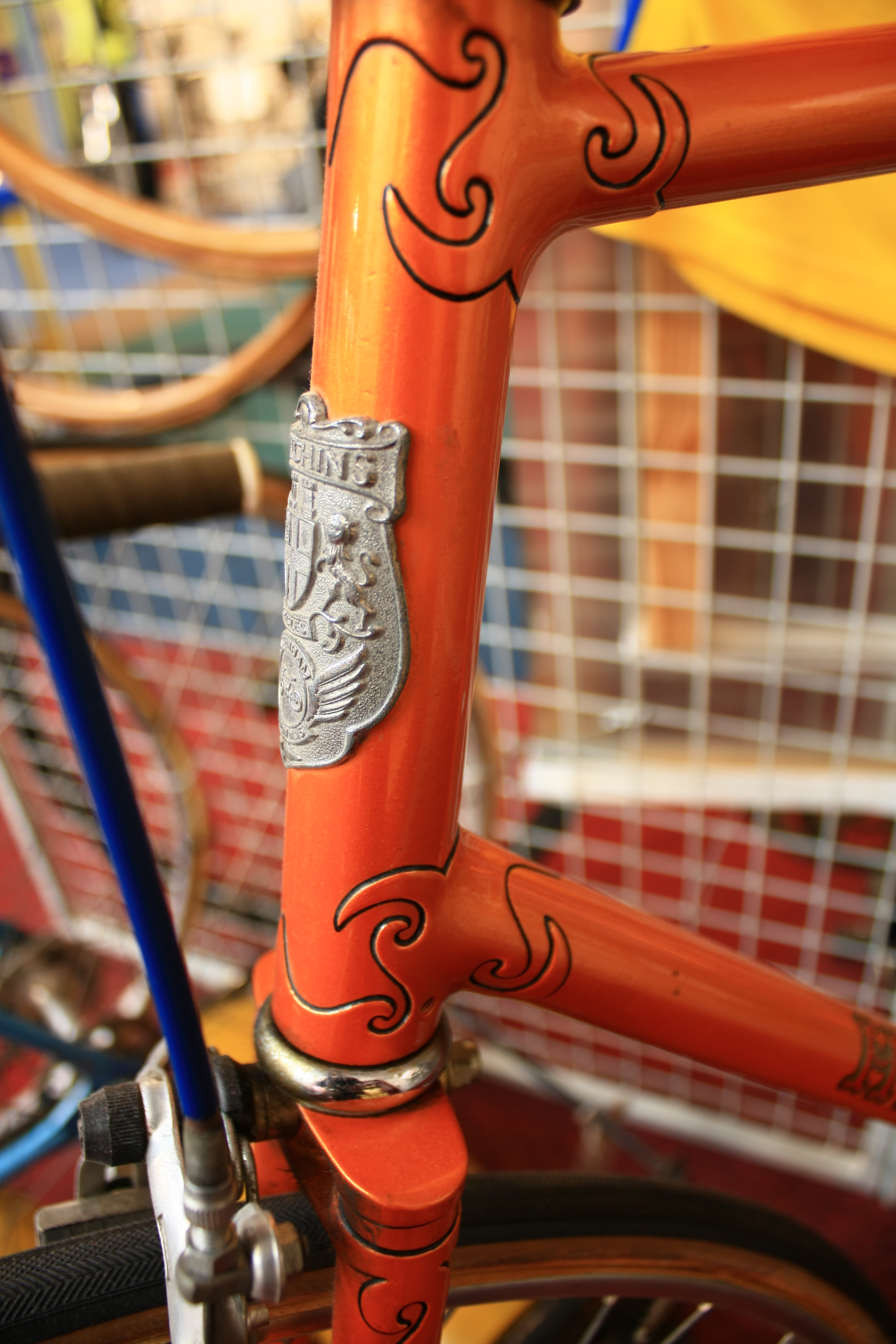
A front steerer tube also known as a head tube, swing bikes also have a second steerer tube near the rear, usually on or near the seat tube.

== Riding ==
A swing bike can operate like a normal bike, but once the moderate learning curve is overcome it can do things a regular single-pivot bike cannot. Swing bikes are capable of splitting the path of the front and rear wheels apart allowing the frame to glide over short obstacles with one wheel on each side. It is similarly possible for one wheel to ride on top of a curb with the other on the street level. Swing bikes can also "drift" allowing the rider to change direction more quickly. When snaking back and forth on a normal bike the angle of the front wheel changes as you turn left and right, on a swing bike, all three main pieces can appear to flow along the curve the rider is taking. The ride feel is significantly different. The appearance of a swing bike in motion is unusual. The lean angles and paths taken can be dramatic or unexpected. Both of these combined make swing bikes popular for parades, showing off, or beach riding.

== See also ==
- Outline of cycling
- Sideways bike
