= Ice cycle =

Bicycle variant used on ice

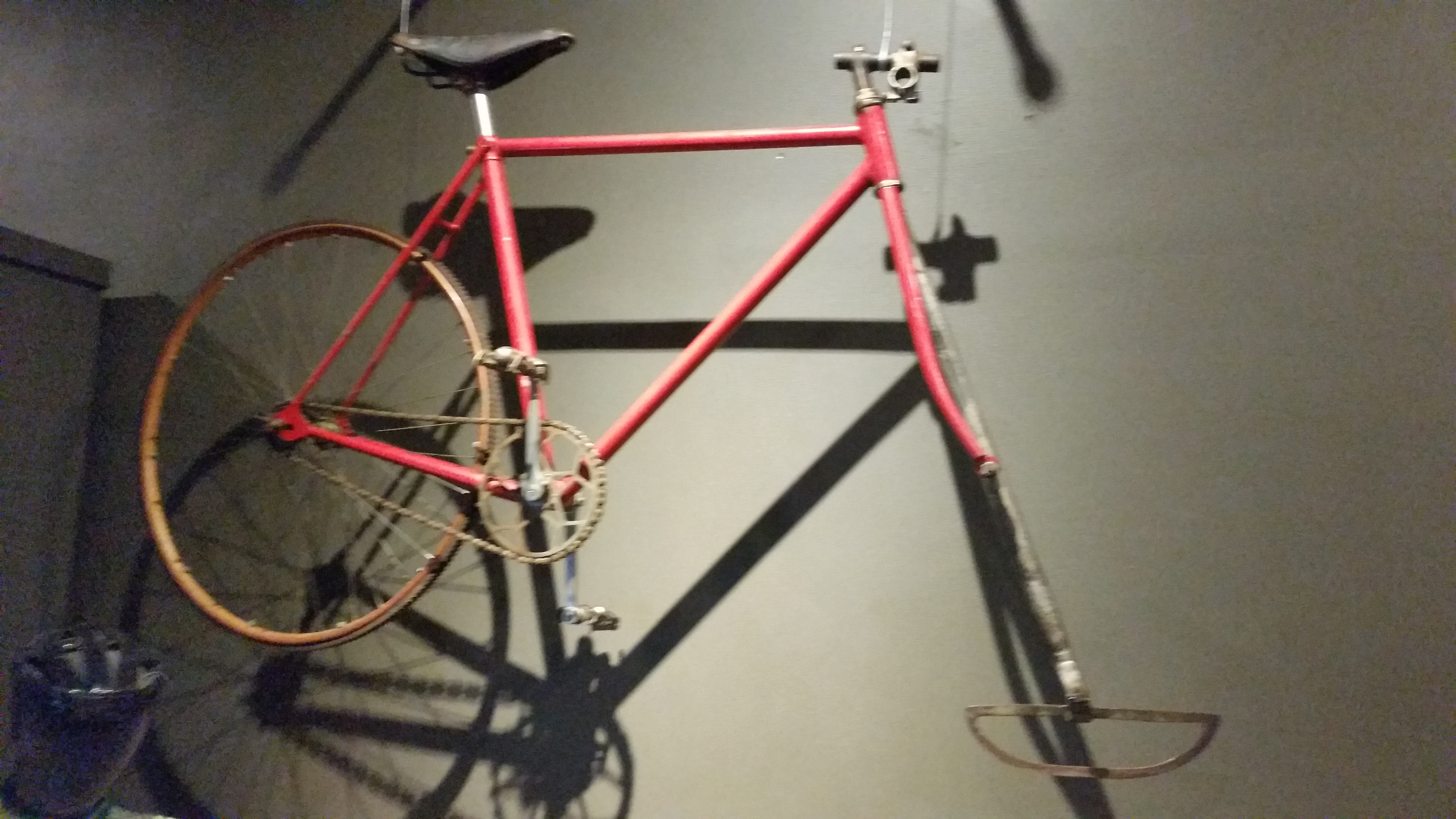
Icycle, a bicycle designed for riding on ice, at the History Museum at the Castle in Appleton, Wisconsin.

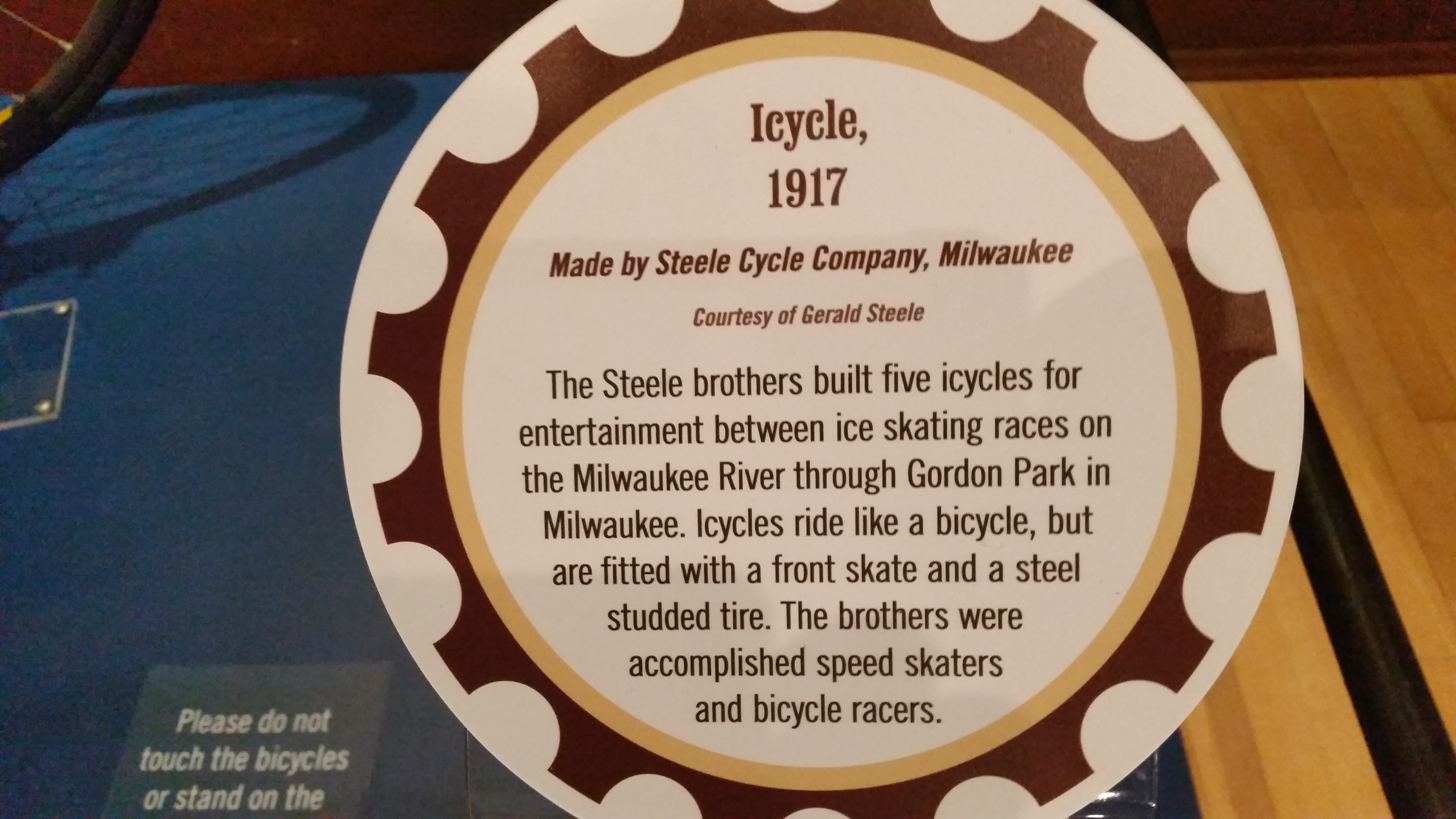
Icycle museum placard, at the History Museum at the Castle.

An ice cycle, ice bike, or icycle is a bicycle adapted for use on ice, usually by replacing the front wheel with an ice skate. Versions exist with and without additional skates to provide lateral stability, that have been based on upright and recumbent bikes, and that have been used for racing. Ice cycles have been in use since at least the 1890s, and theory predicts that a bicycle with a front skate can exhibit riderless self-stability similar to the same bicycle with a front wheel. At least one example has been made with both the front and the rear wheels replaced by skates.

== Gallery ==
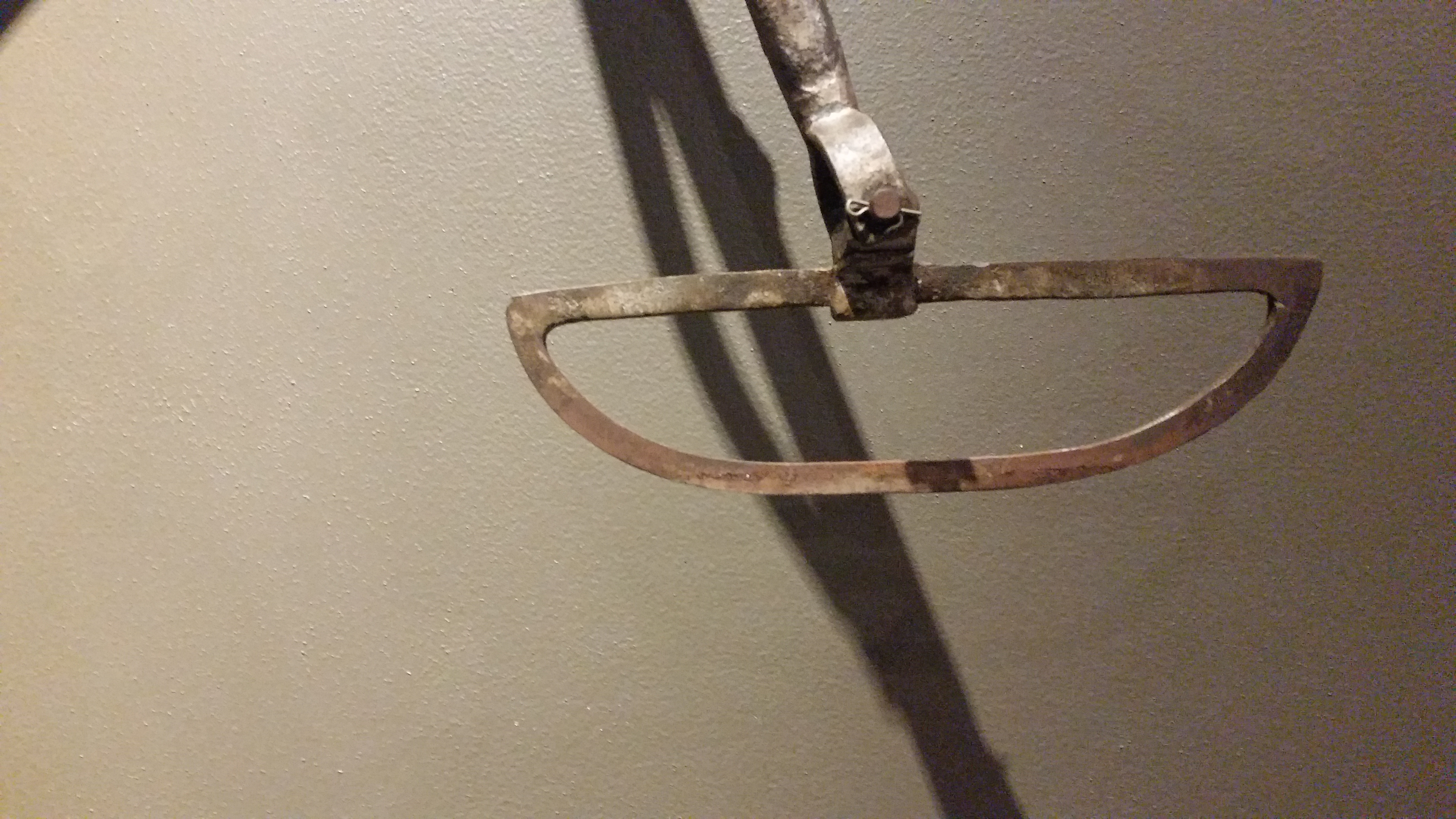
Front skate of Icycle

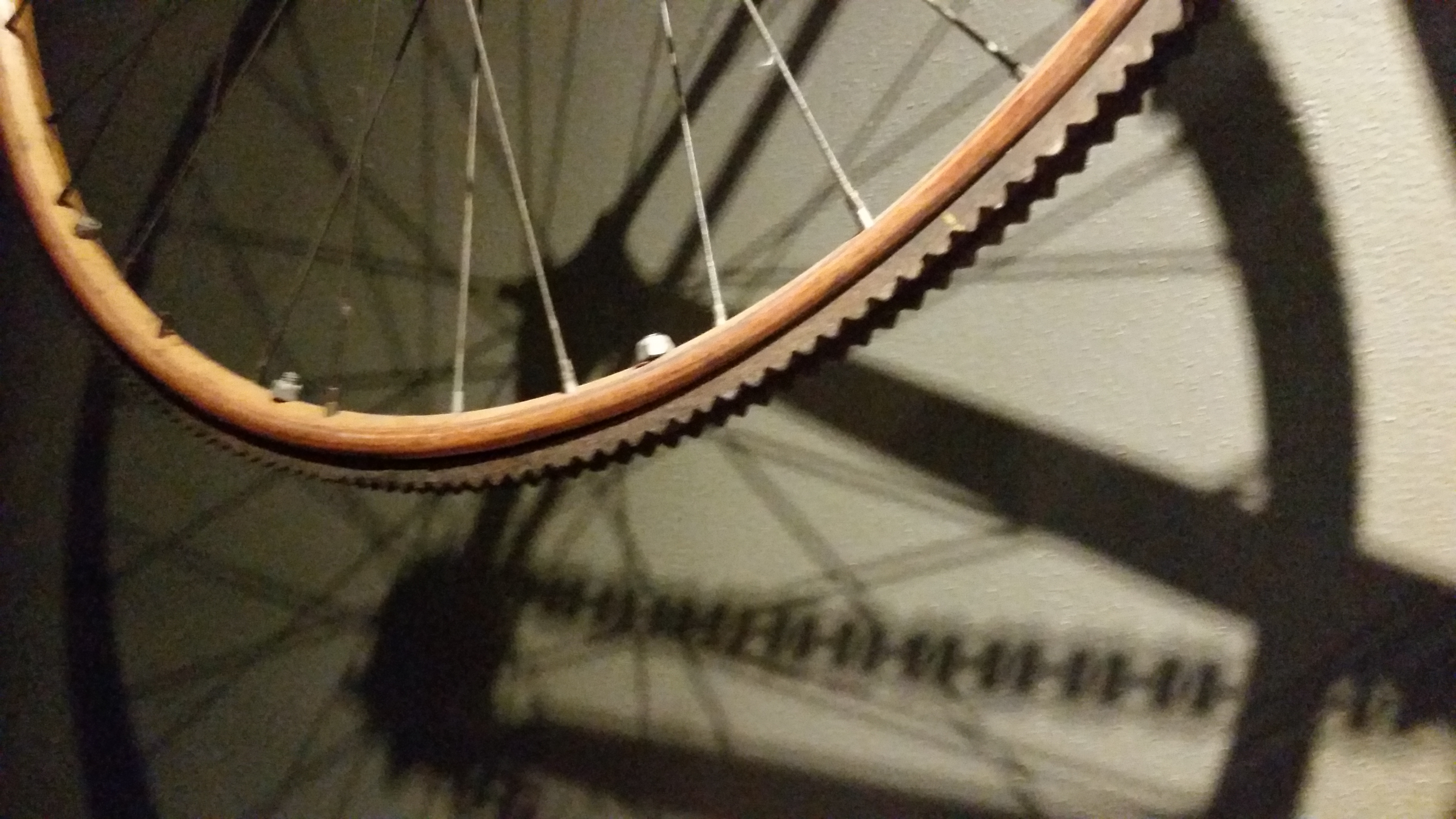
Rear wheel of Icycle

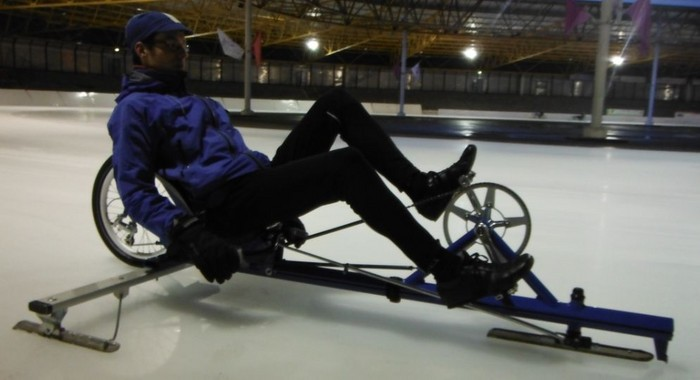
Icetrack bike

== See also ==
- Bicycle fairing
- Cold-weather biking
- Icetrack cycling
- Two-mass-skate bicycle
- Skibob
