= Sideways bike =

Bicycle design variation

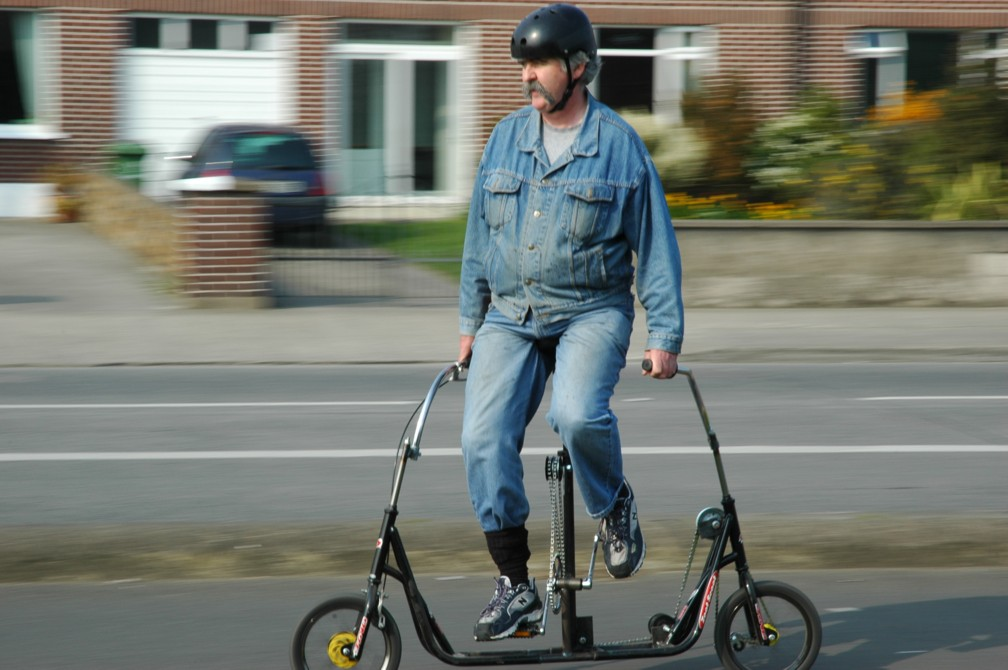

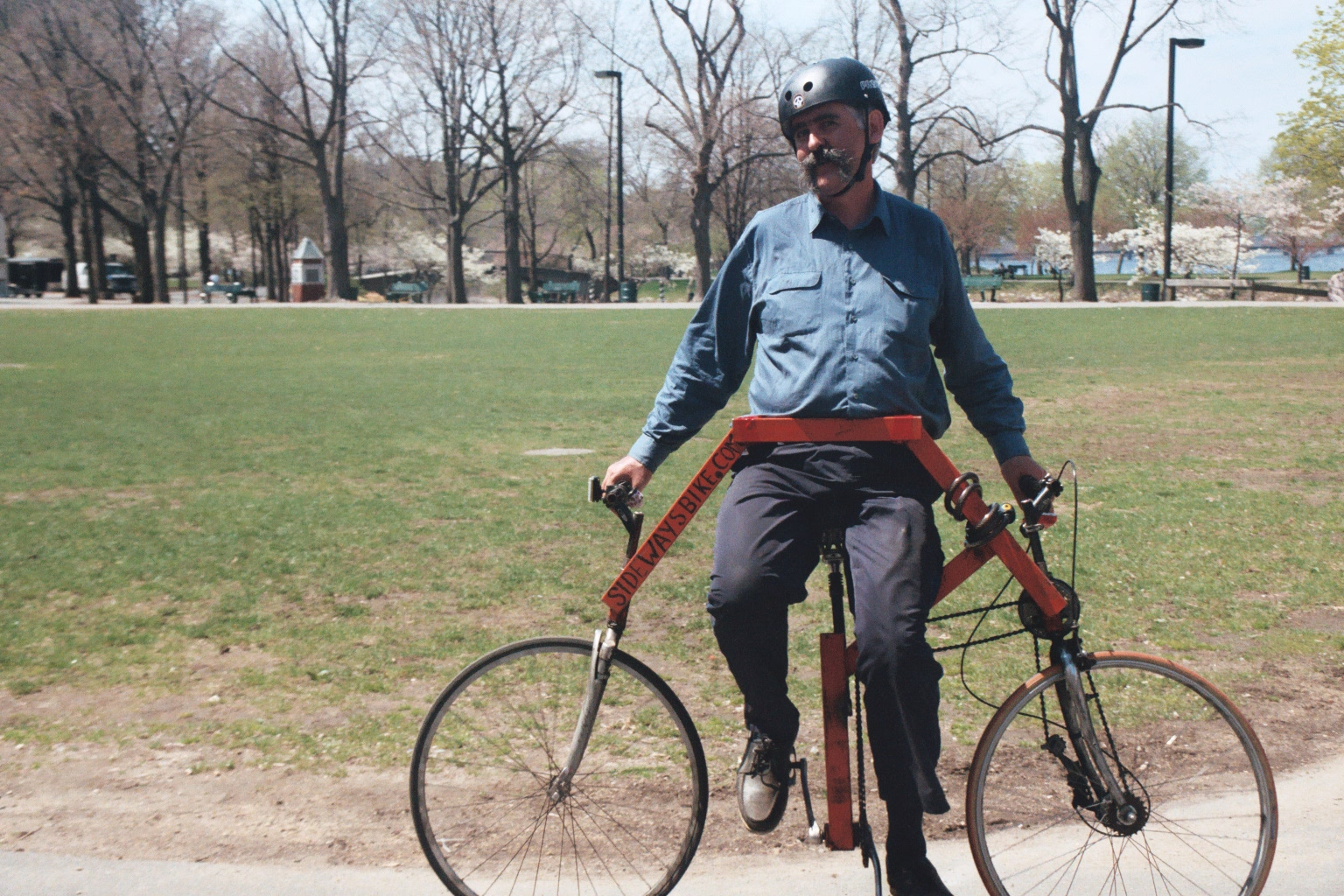

The sideways bike is an invention, patented in 2005, by Michael Killian, a software engineer from Dublin. He was inspired by his view that snowboarding offered greater artistic potential to skiing, and decided to design a snowboard equivalent based on the conventional bicycle. The result: a bike ridden sideways with the rider operating both wheels. The bike, unlike a conventional bike, uses front-to-back balance like a snowboard. Conventional bikes use left-to-right balance, like skis. The bike is aimed at the youth market and has won a number of invention awards.

== Bicycle design ==
The sideways bike is different in many ways from a conventional diamond-framed bicycle. The rider controls direction by steering with both front and back handlebars. This means that the bicycle can maneuver effectively in congested conditions, weaving in and out of cars and performing tight turns. It also means that the rider can move the bike sideways, as the name suggests, such that the movement is perpendicular to the direction in which the frame points. Although this is possible, it is very difficult, as it is necessary for the rider to have extremely good balance and coordination.

The position of the pedals and cranks varies from bike to bike. Some sideways bicycles have them positioned in the same way that a normal bike does; however, there are some that are placed such that the rider must sit not facing in the direction of movement but perpendicular to it. This means that turning is easier and more elegant; however, visibility is impaired as the rider must turn his or her neck all the time.

Sideways bikes are single speed, which means that gears have not yet been worked into the complex design of transmission of power from the cranks to the back wheel. Since it pivots, a normal chain system cannot function, but Killian created a part that allows the rear cassette to cause the wheel to rotate even when turning, by having an intermediate piece that can transmit the power.

Rather than using a normal saddle for a bike, the sideways bike uses a unicycle saddle to aid balance.

The sizes of the wheels vary considerably between different sideways bikes in order for each bike to be adapted to its purposes correctly.

== Advantages and disadvantages versus conventional bikes ==
=== Advantages ===
- Due to the nature of its steering mechanism, the sideways bike has the potential for making turns with smaller radii than those of conventional front-wheel-steered bikes of the same wheelbase.

=== Disadvantages ===
- Overlean is a common error that new riders make, caused by leaning too far over when cornering.
- Parts are highly specialized because of the low volume of such bikes produced.
- Neck aches are a common complaint since riders must keep their heads turned in order to see the road ahead, and, because of the need to keep the legs aligned approximately with the cranks, cannot spread this rotation throughout their body as skateboarders and snowboarders can.

== See also ==
- Outline of cycling
- Swing Bike
