= Front loader =

front loader may refer to:

- Loader (equipment), a form of tractor
- Washing machine, front loading type
- Front loader (bicycle), a cargo bike with the loading area low in front of the rider, also known as Long John's
