= Cyclologistics =

Freight transport by bicycles

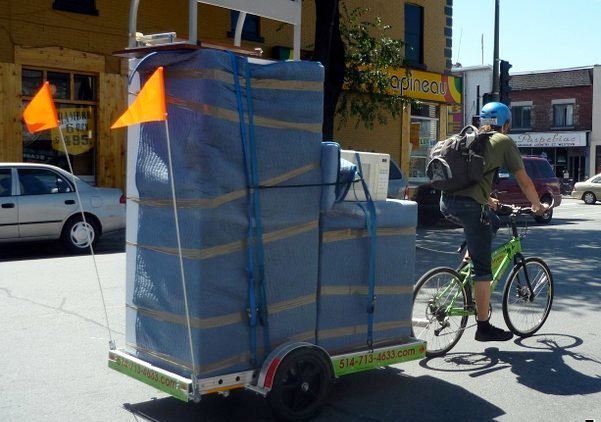
Freight distribution in a bicycle trailer.

Cycle logistics, cargo bike logistics, bike logistics or cyclologistics is a form of freight transport and distribution that uses cargo bicycles or tricycles, with or without electric assistance, to carry out logistics activities, mainly in urban environments. This model can be used both for personal purposes and for professional delivery services, and it is considered part of urban logistics. Its application is particularly relevant in the so-called last mile, that is, the final stage of the transport of goods from a distribution center to the final recipient.

The development of cycle logistics is related to the growth of e-commerce and the increasing volume of deliveries in cities, which has led to a rise in the number of delivery vehicles and the problems associated with urban traffic. These problems include congestion, air and noise pollution, and the occupation of public space. In response to this situation, cycle logistics is presented as a more efficient and sustainable alternative, since bicycles take up less space, produce no emissions, and can move more easily through dense urban environments.

Cycle logistics activities encompass different types of transport and services. These include the courier delivery of documents and small parcels, home delivery, parcel distribution for logistics companies, and the transport of food products or other goods within the city. These services are usually carried out with cargo bicycles adapted to transport goods of different sizes and weights.

In many cases, cycle logistics is organized through urban micro-logistics centers or microhubs. In this system, goods arrive at these points located within the city, where they are sorted and later distributed by bicycle. This model makes it possible to optimize freight distribution in urban areas and reduce the circulation of motorized vehicles in city centers.

== See also ==
- Cargo bike racing, bicycle race using cargo bikes
- Cyclability
- Last mile
- Utility cycling
