= Cargo bike racing =

Tight racing at the Cargo Bike Spring Race at the International Cargo Bike Festival Berlin (2018)

Pit stop during VELOBerlin 2024 at Tempelhofer Feld, Berlin

Competitor staying out during the VELOBerlin 2024 race

Cargo bike race in Christchurch in 2014

Cargo bikes lined up at the start of the annual 2025 Svajerløbet, the Danish cargo bike championships in Copenhagen

Cargo bike racing is bicycle racing using cargo bikes such as front-loaders, longtails, or other heavy-duty transport cycles and family cycles rather than standard road or mountain bicycles. One of the most typical formats is spectator-friendly multi-lap criteriums, with pit stops including loading and sometimes also unloading of cargo. Another type of format is messenger-style races across town in a fashion which has some similarities with cycling orienteering, but while carrying cargo. In principle, cargo bikes can be used in any type of cycling. For example, cargo bikes have also been used in randonneuring, time trials, or even in triathlon, and track cycling (cargo bike hour record of 35.9 km). While races traditionally were held between delivery workers using cargo bicycles and sometimes celebrities, contemporary races are open to all enthusiasts with cargo bikes. There may be separate categories for cargo bicycles, cargo tricycles, as well as separate classes for manually operated "muscle" cycles and electrically assisted pedelec cycles.

== History ==
In Denmark, cargo bike races (so called "svajerløb") were held annually from 1943 to 1960. Until 1949 they were held in Emdrup neighbourhood of Copenhagen, after which the races were at Israels Plads in Copenhagen until 1960. Here the messengers ran against celebrities, among others. Bicycle couriers became fewer as their work was either taken over by couriers in cars or replaced by the telephone and the fax machine. To a lesser extent, local grocers or cooperative stores continued to offer goods delivery by bicycle.

The Cycle Messenger World Championships (CMWC), where the main race has been held since 1993, also has a cargo bike race side event that requires cyclists to transport oversized objects from one point to another. Typical objects chosen for delivery range from beer kegs to boxes. Hay bales, pallets and lengths of lumber have also been used in the challenge. Cyclists are encouraged to come up with creative ways of transporting such irregularly shaped objects while still using a bicycle. Many competitors prefer to use panniers and trailers, while some even use specially designed bicycles for the event.

In the early 2000s, cargo bikes were once again popularized in Denmark and the Netherlands, possibly as a response to mass automobility, the saturation of motorized transport in urban areas, and the resulting air pollution.

In 2009, the Danish Cargo Bike Championship, also known as the "Svajerløb", was revived. The term "svajer" was used to describe these cargo bike riders because of the way they would sway while pedaling. The 11th consecutive race was held in 2019 on August 14, making it an event whose tradition spans almost 100 years, though it was not held for several decades.

Since 2015, the International Cargo Bike Race has been held annually at Tempelhofer Feld in Berlin, and is part of the VELOBerlin bicycle festival. In Bremen, a 6th cargo bike race took place in 2019, while in Kiel, an event titled "Förde, Fracht und Fahrspaß" ("Fjord, Freight, and Cycling Fun") was held in 2019 on September 22, along the Kiellinie waterfront promenade that was closed to the public at the time due to construction work.

Other major cargo bike racing events include the Open Dutch Cycle Messenger Championships, the Belgisch Kampioenschap Cargofietsen and the International Cargo Bike Festival (ICBF).

== See also ==
- Appropriate technology, technology that is suitable where it is to be applied, environmentally sound, and promotes self-sufficiency on the part of those using it
- Cycle Messenger World Championships, urban cycling competition
- Truck racing, motorsport racing involving trucks
