= Cargo bike =

Human powered vehicle to carry goods

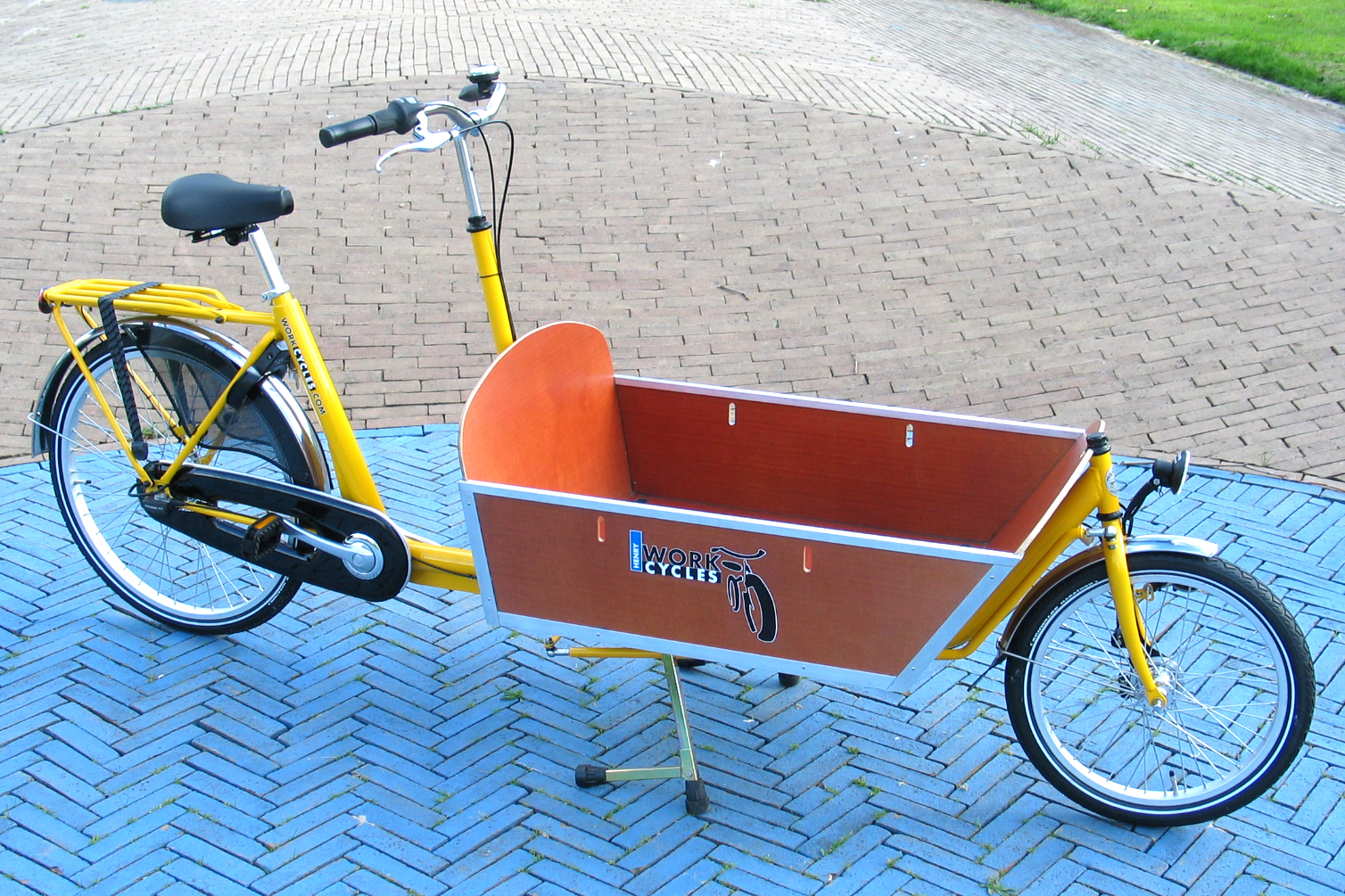
- Modern long-wheelbase cargo bike from Amsterdam
- Classification: Vehicle
- Application: Transportation
- Fuel source: Human-power, Motor-power, Electric
- Wheels: 2–4
- Axles: 0–2
- Components: Frame, Wheels, Tires, Saddle, Handlebar, Pedals, Drivetrain, Cargo area
- Examples: Butcher's bike, Porteur, Cycle truck, Boda-boda, Stroller bike, Long john, off-road, Longtail, Wooden
- Types: Bicycle, Tricycle, Quadracycle

There have been many human powered wheeled vehicles designed and constructed specifically for transporting loads since their earliest appearance in the 19th century. They are referred to variously depending on the number of wheels — typically two, three, or four — and by their specific use. Adjectives used to describe the tasks to which the bicycles, dicycles, tricycles, or quadracycles are put include cargo cycles (bi- / tri- / etc.), freight cycles, box cycles (due to the luggage carrier's shape), carrier cycles, and so on. Sometimes they are also called cycletrucks, which uses a sense of the word 'truck' predating the automobile.

Cargo bike designs include a cargo area consisting of an open or enclosed box, a flat platform, or a wire basket, usually mounted over one or both wheels, low behind the front wheel, or between parallel wheels at either the front or rear of the vehicle. The frame, drivetrain and wheels must be constructed to handle loads larger than those on an ordinary bicycle.

== Development ==
The first cargo bikes were used by tradesmen to deliver mail, bread and milk amongst other things. Early cargo bikes were heavy-duty standard bicycles, with heavy carriers at front or rear, sometimes with a smaller front wheel to accommodate a large front carrier. During the early part of the 20th century these were commonly used by tradesmen for local deliveries. In the UK this style is still sometimes known as a butcher's bike or delibike, although the Post Office have by far the largest fleet.

With the domination of the internal combustion engine in the industrialized countries after World War II, cargo bikes became less popular. In the rest of the world, however, they continued to be manufactured and heavily used. In the 2000s, ecologically minded designers and small-scale manufacturers initiated a revival of the cargo bike manufacturing sector.

Some cargo bike makers and users use power assist motors to complement the power of the cyclist. Power assist can increase the payload and range of cargo bikes, but also increases the cost of the bicycle and requires an on-board battery.

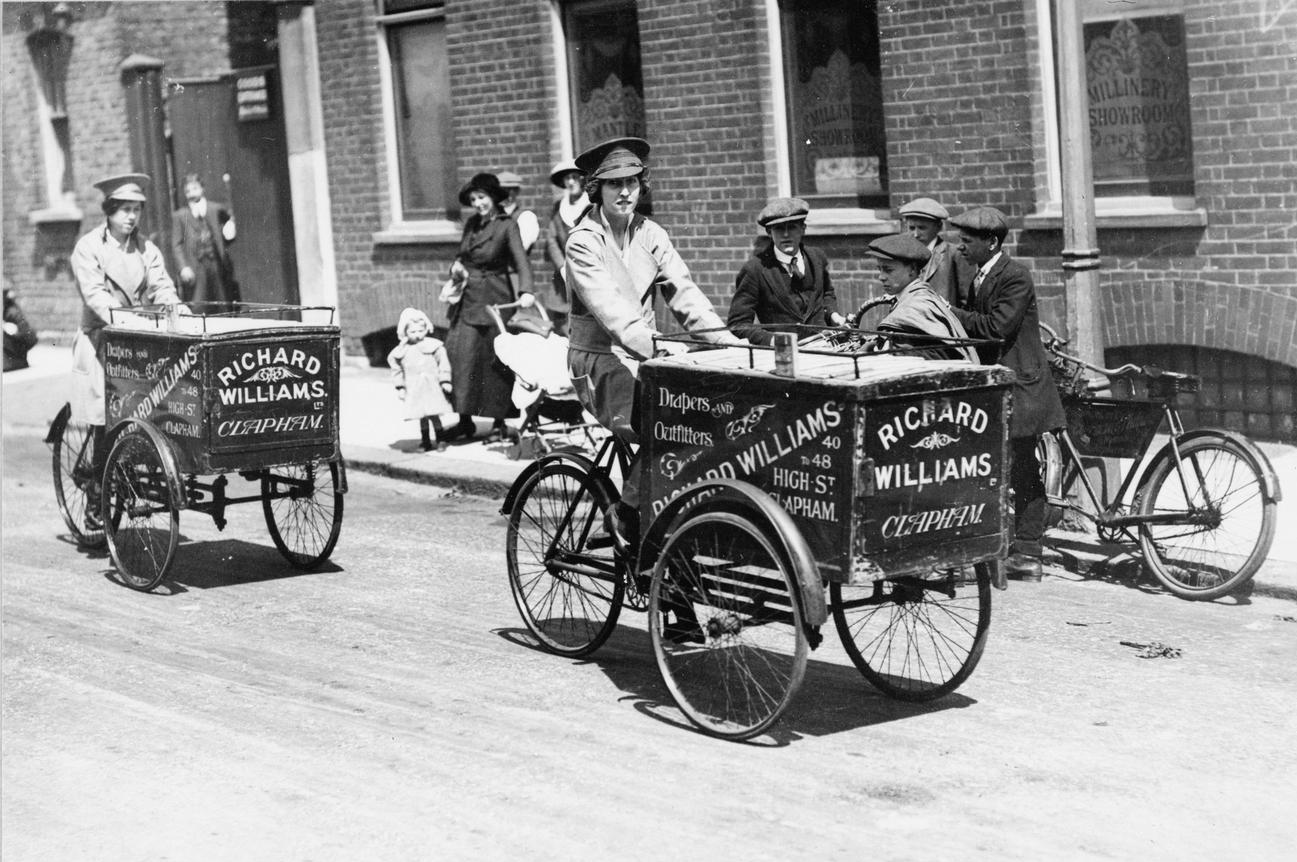
Two couriers making deliveries with cargo trikes, July 1915

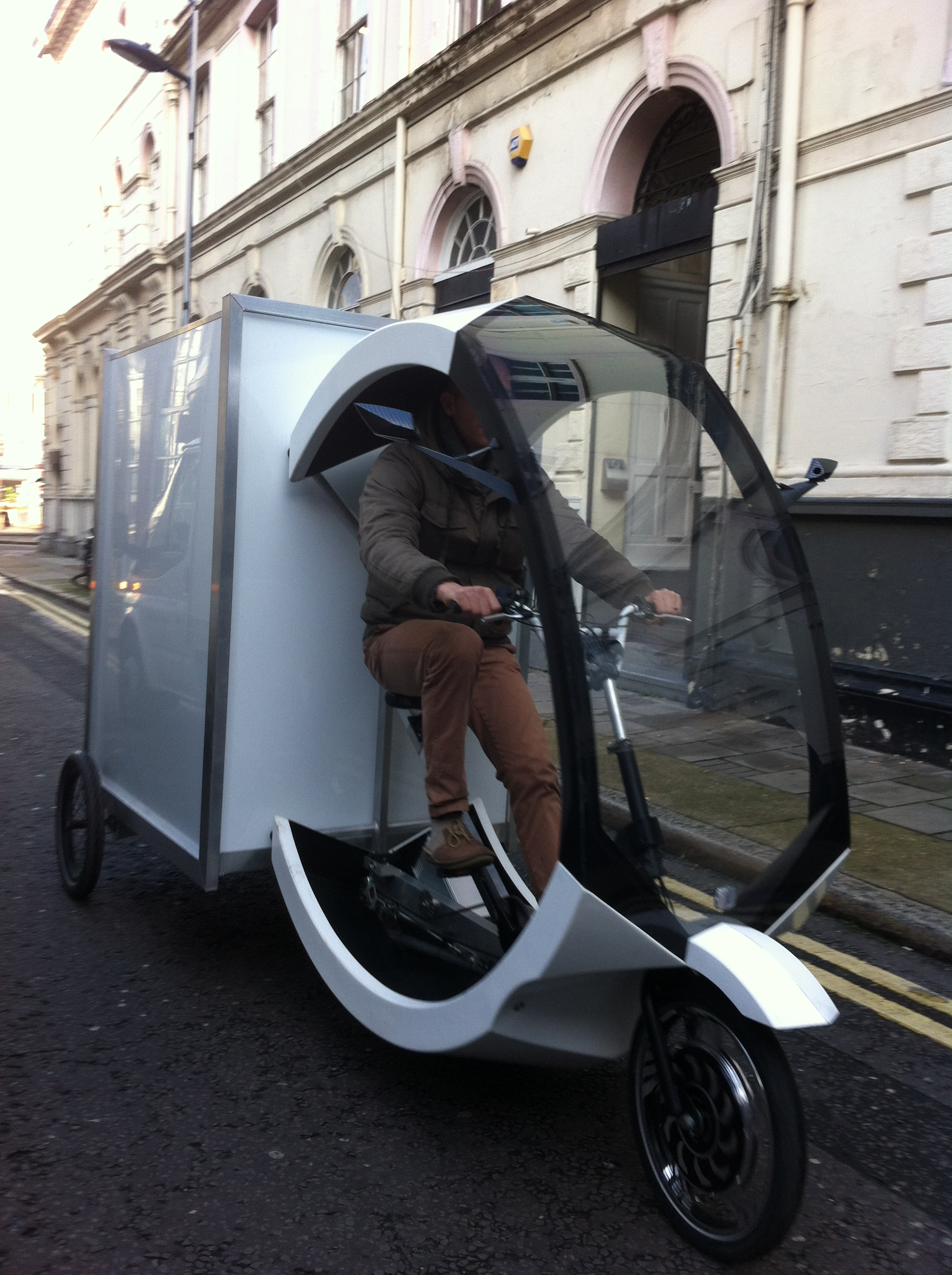
A modern cargo trike in use in London, featuring electric assist

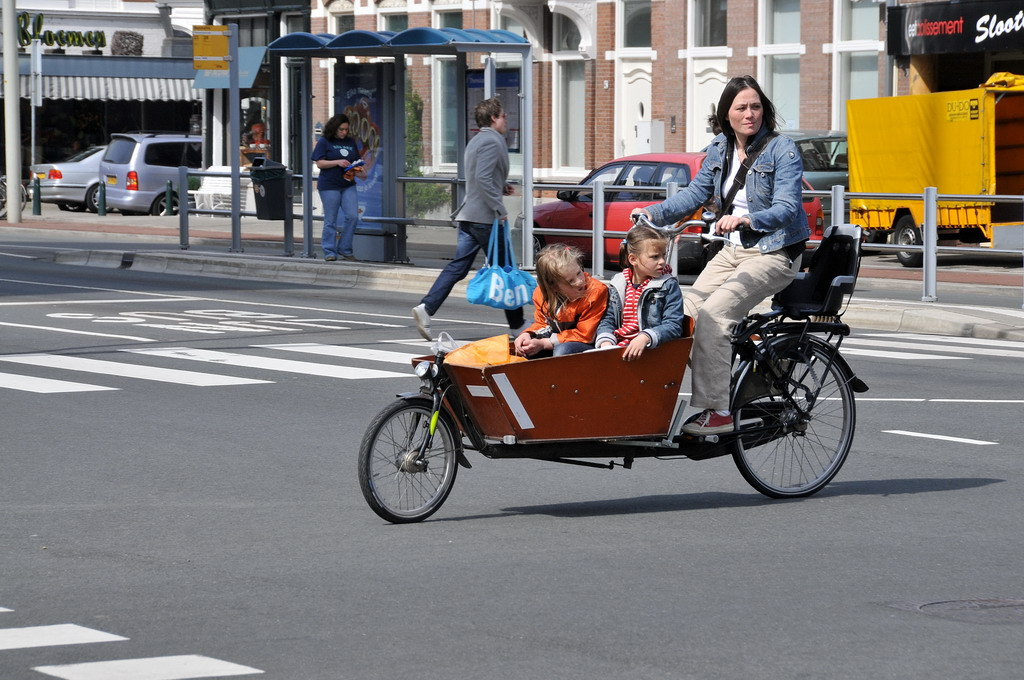
Mother with two children in the Hague (Netherlands)

== Common uses ==
Cargo bikes are used in a variety of settings:

- Delivery services in dense urban environments
- Transporting children
- Food vending in high foot traffic areas (including specialist ice cream bikes)
- Transporting trade tools, including around large installations such as power stations and CERN
- Airport cargo handling
- Recycling collections
- Warehouse inventory transportation
- Mail delivery (The UK post office operates a fleet of 33,000 bicycles, mainly the Pashley MailStar)

== Types ==
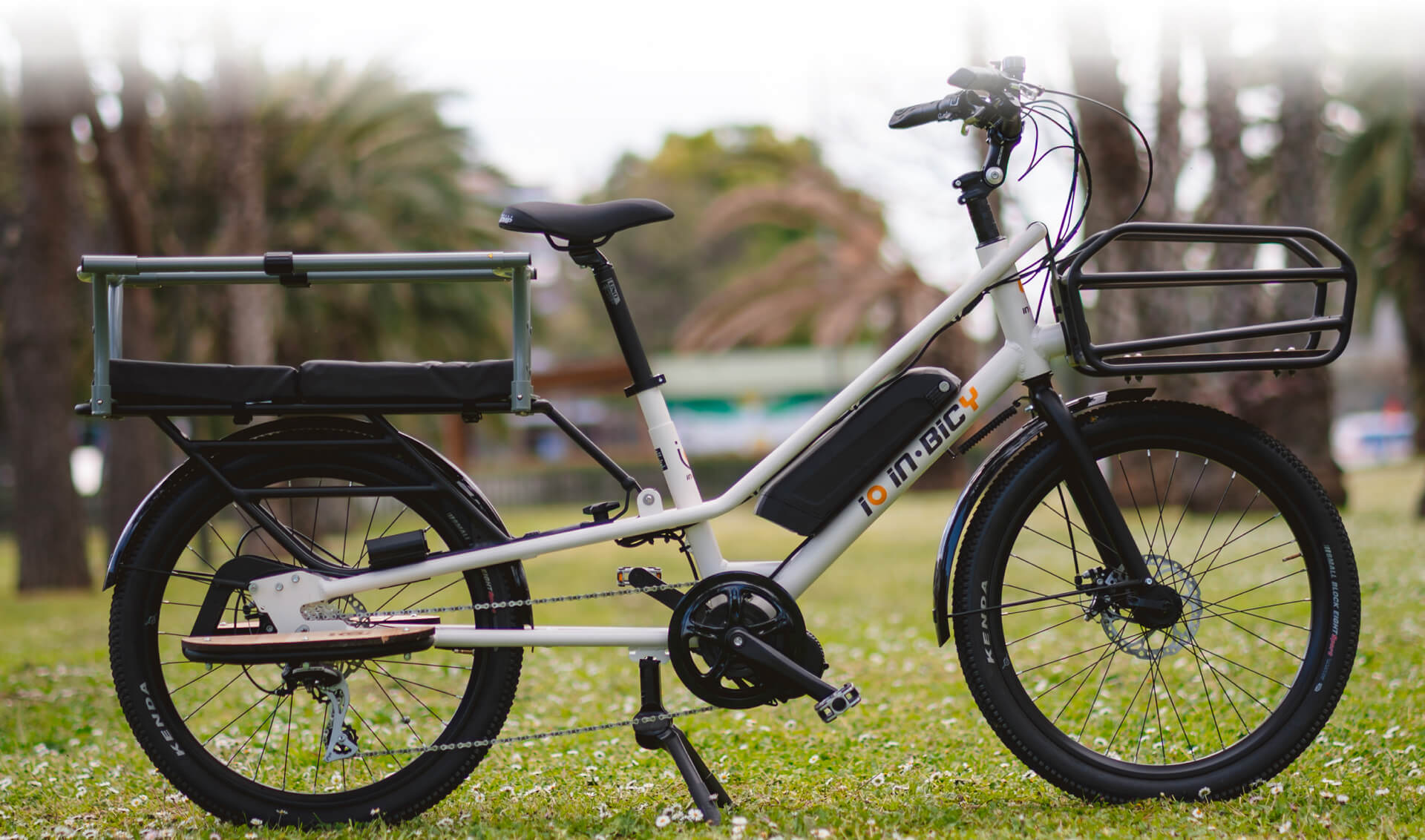
A butcher and long tail bike

There is a broad variety of specially made cargo bikes including low-loading two-wheelers with extended wheelbases, bicycles with small front wheels to fit huge front carriers, tadpole-type three-wheelers with a box between the two front wheels. Other varieties include a platform, basket etc. instead of the box, the loading area between two rear wheels (delta-fashion), small-wheel two-wheelers loading both back and front. An occasional four-wheeler can also be seen, especially within a plant, warehouse or the like, where demands on stability and loading capacity are higher than on range.

Many models are now available with an electric assist which can make them more useful for longer distances or for varied terrain, i.e. not flat cities, amongst other reasons, such as feeling more confident riding in car traffic due to faster acceleration from stopping.

=== Porteur bicycle ===
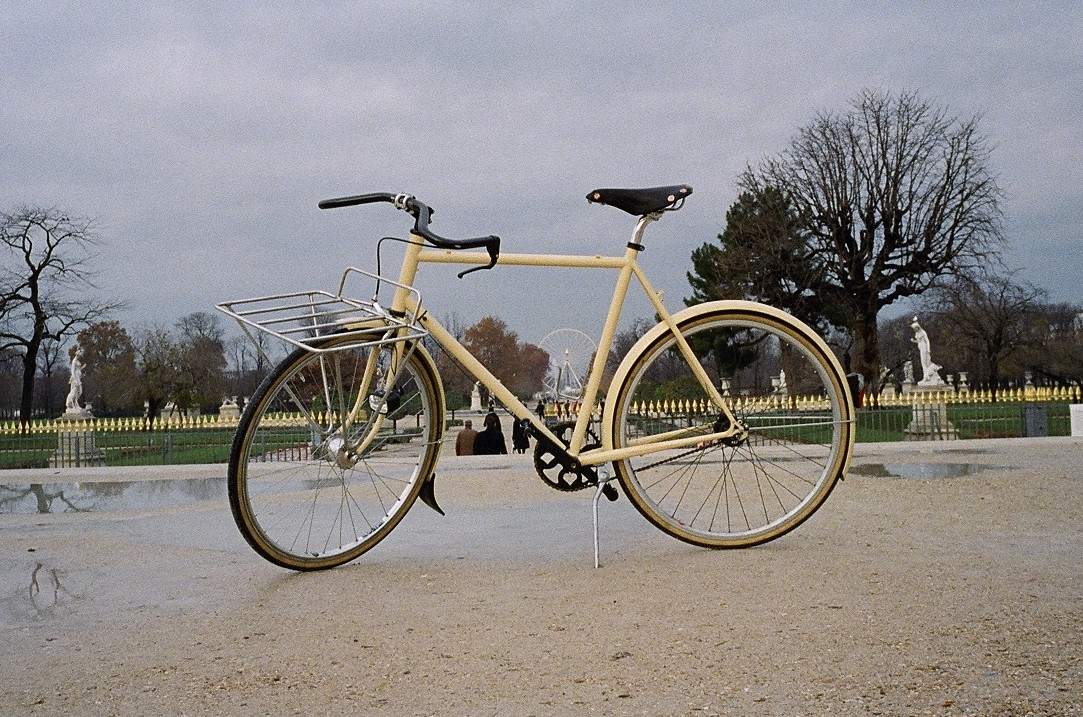
A bicycle styled after the classic French Porteur bicycle (1969)

A porteur bicycle has the rack on the front, typically attached to the fork, and can carry as much as 50 kg (110 lb) that way.

=== Butcher's bike ===
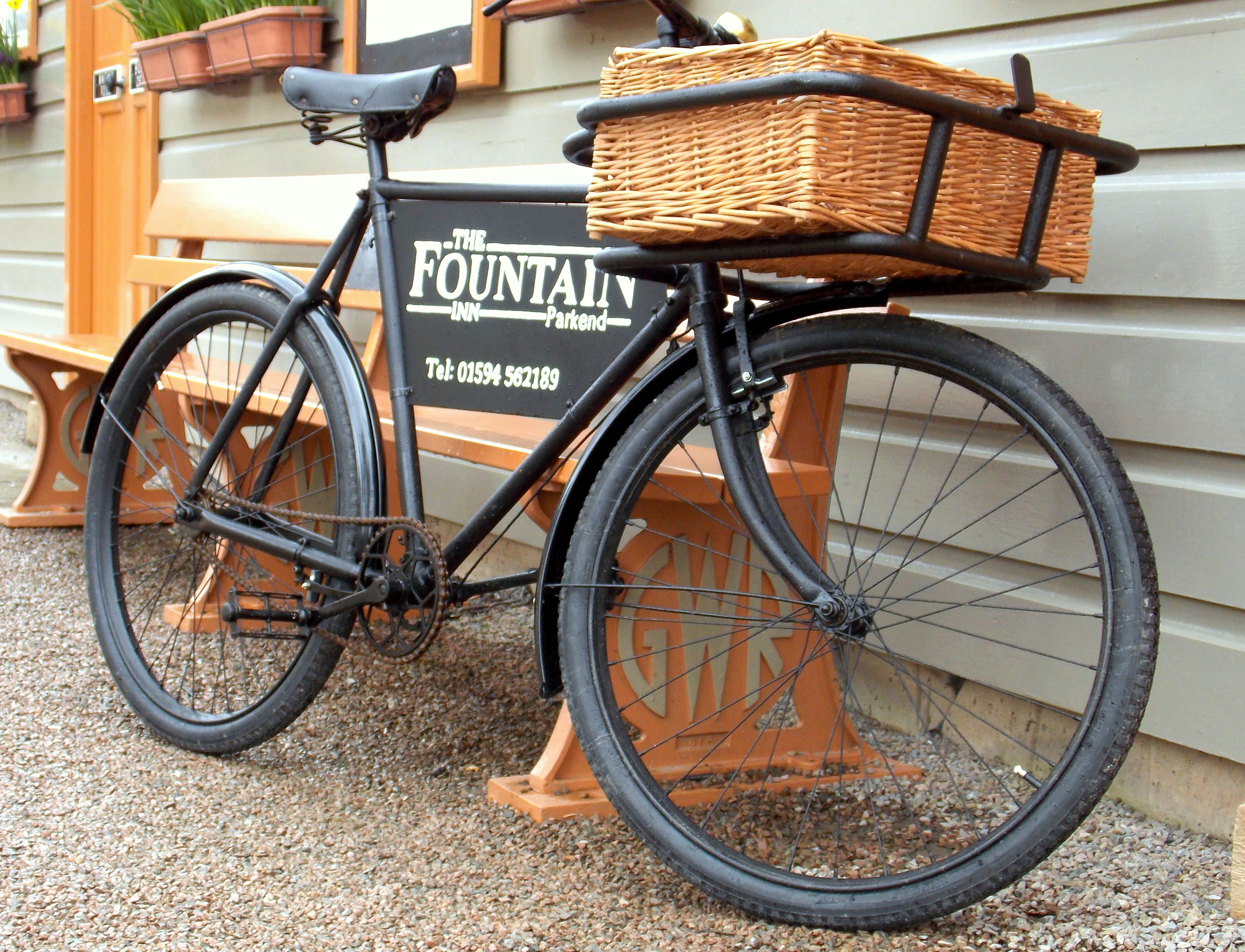
Typical 1930s Butcher's Bike, Forest of Dean, England (2013)

Also referred to as a Baker's bike, although this style of cargo bike was popular with a wide variety of trades during the first half of the 20th century, particularly in the United Kingdom. Typically, they would have a basket or storage box mounted within a framework which was fixed to the main frame (not the forks) of the bike. Often, they would also feature a sign advertising the business concerned, which would be attached within the main triangle of the bicycle frame.

The Cycle Truck, such as Schwinn Cycle Truck (produced in the USA between 1939 and 1967), also employed the same basket to frame arrangement, but with a smaller front wheel than rear, typically 66 cm (26 in) rear and 51 cm (20 in) front.

=== Boda-boda ===
A boda-boda (or bodaboda) is a two-wheeled bicycle or motorcycle taxi, originally in East Africa. Boda Boda is also the name of Yuba Bicycles compact cargo bike introduced in 2012.

=== Electric cargo bike ===
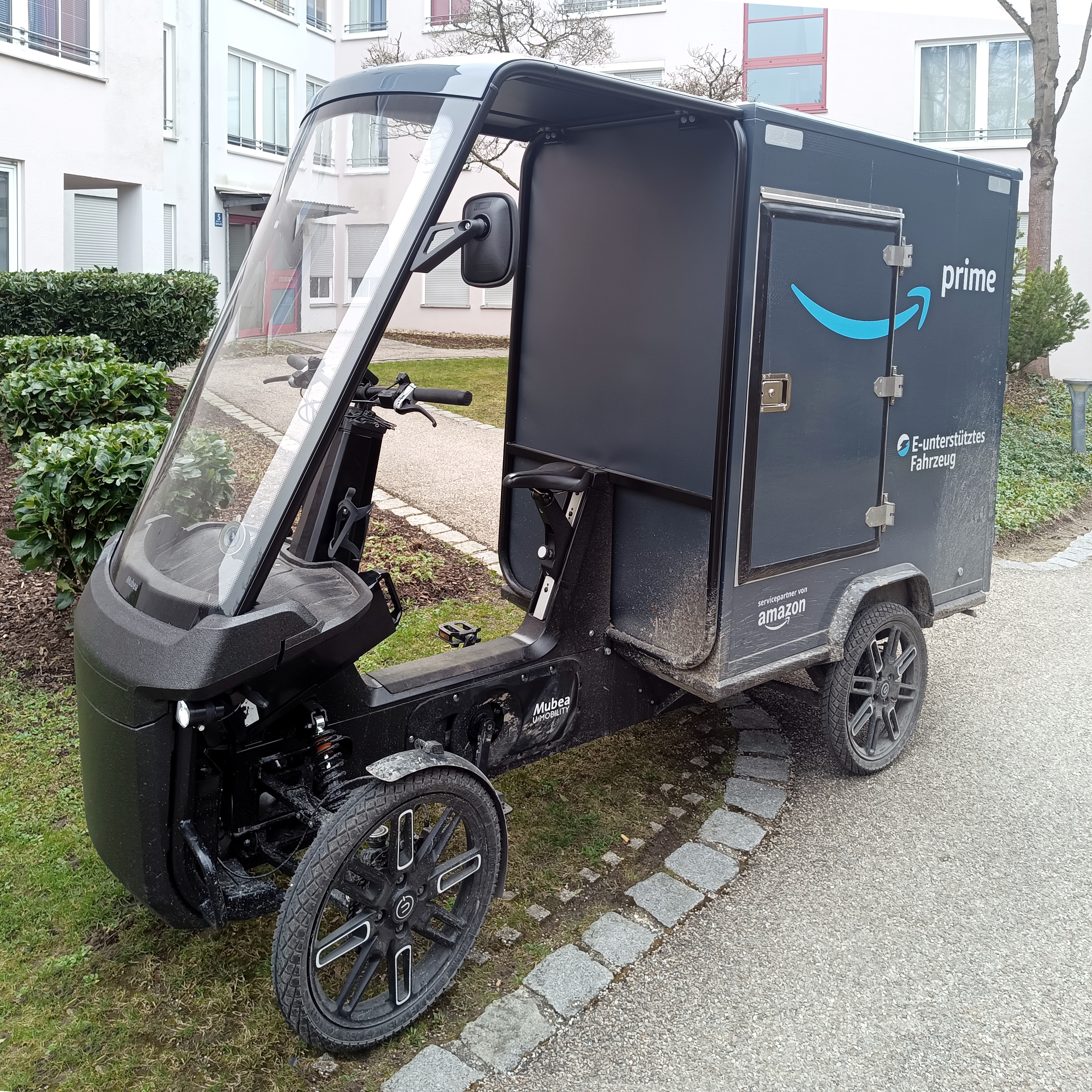
Electric cargo quadracycle

Electric assisted cargo bikes (also known as e-cargo bikes or cycletrucks) are cargo bikes powered by human muscle power and an electric motor (e-bike). In addition to transporting goods and people in private settings, they are also intended to gradually take over future commercial delivery traffic in city centers. Cargo vehicles for commercial use have three or four wheels and are usually enclosed like a velomobile.

=== Stroller bike ===
A cargo bicycle that converts into a stroller. Three wheels are used when the bike is in a stroller configuration, and two wheels are used when it is in a bike configuration with the cargo in front of the cyclist. This cargo bike can carry up to 100 lbs (45.4 kg). The stroller bike won the Gold Award at the Eurobike exhibition in 2018 as a special-purpose bike.

=== Long john bicycle ===
The long john bicycle is a cargo bike with the cargo area in front of the rider and some linkage connecting the steering to the front wheel, "linkage steering". Capacity is usually about 100 kg (220 lb). A traditional long john will have a smaller front wheel and a 58 or 66 cm (23 or 26 in) rear wheel, plus a 76–102 cm (30–40 in) long platform, basket, or box located low, in front of the handlebars.

The term "bakfiets" (which literally means "box bike" in Dutch; plural is "bakfietsen") is the Dutch word for cargo bikes in general. Bakfiets has traditionally mainly been used to refer to cargo tricycles with two front wheels, while the term Deense bakfiets ("Danish cargo bike") is sometimes used to describe the Long John style of bicycle.

Vintage long johns are becoming collectible. The last known manufacturer to still produce the original long john is Monark. The history of long john bicycles is traced to Denmark c. 1923. The Smith & Co. Company (SCO - founded by Ivar Smith and Robert Jacobsen in Odense, Denmark 17 October 1894) was the inventor and the first to build this type of cargo bicycle. The first Long-John was presented to the public at the Wembley World Fair & Exhibition in 1924.

This style of bicycle is useful for carrying cargo, including children, and can function as a car replacement for many families. It is possible to install a carseat in the box to for babies, and when children get older, they are often seated on a small bench and clipped in with a 3- or 5-point harness. Canopies can be affixed to the cargo box for protection from the elements, making a warm and inviting space for children to enjoy the ride.

Danish long john cargo bike, 3-speed hub (2007)

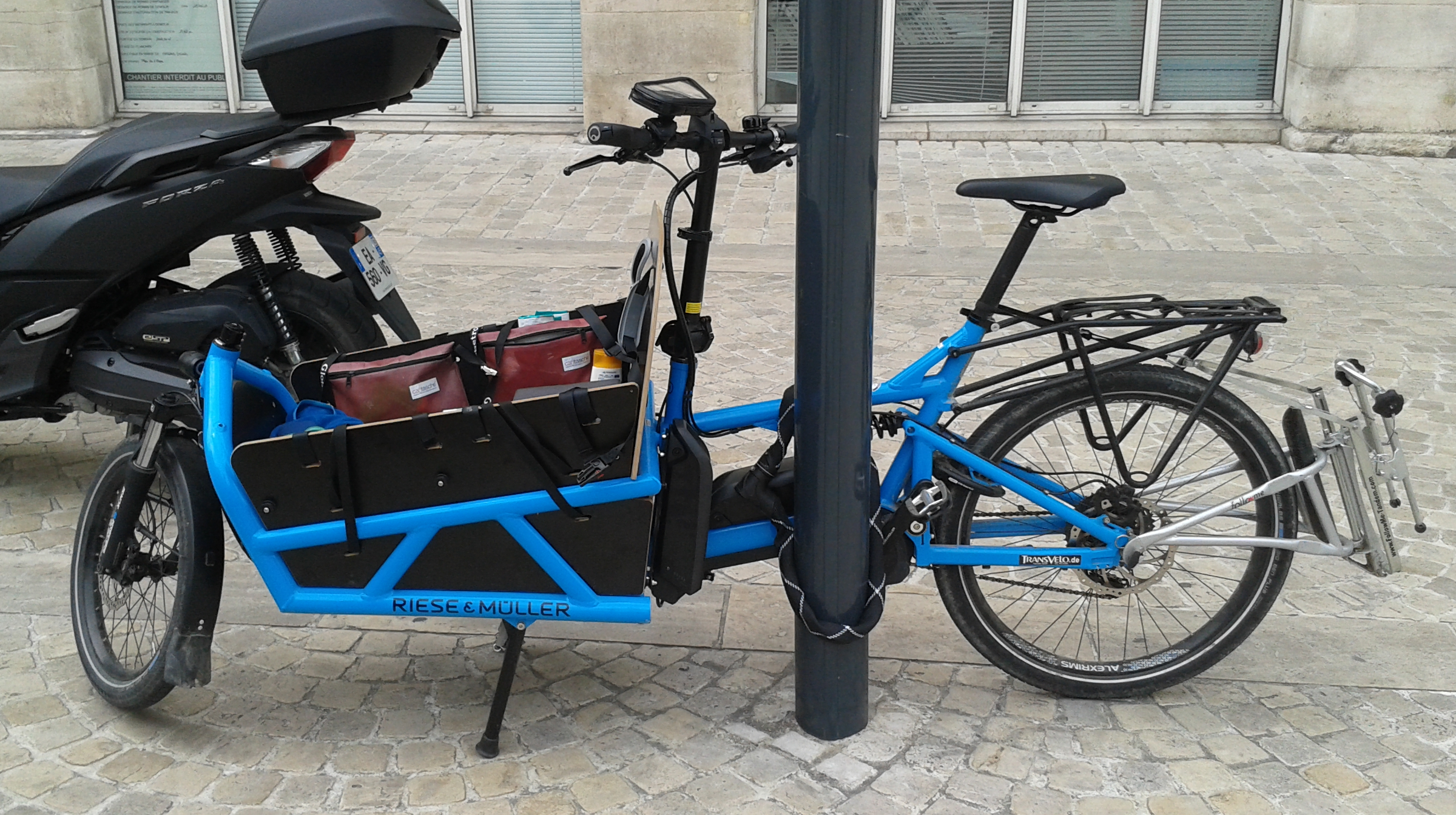
Modern fork-steered long john e-cargo bike (2018)

Kettler cargo bike with hub-center steering

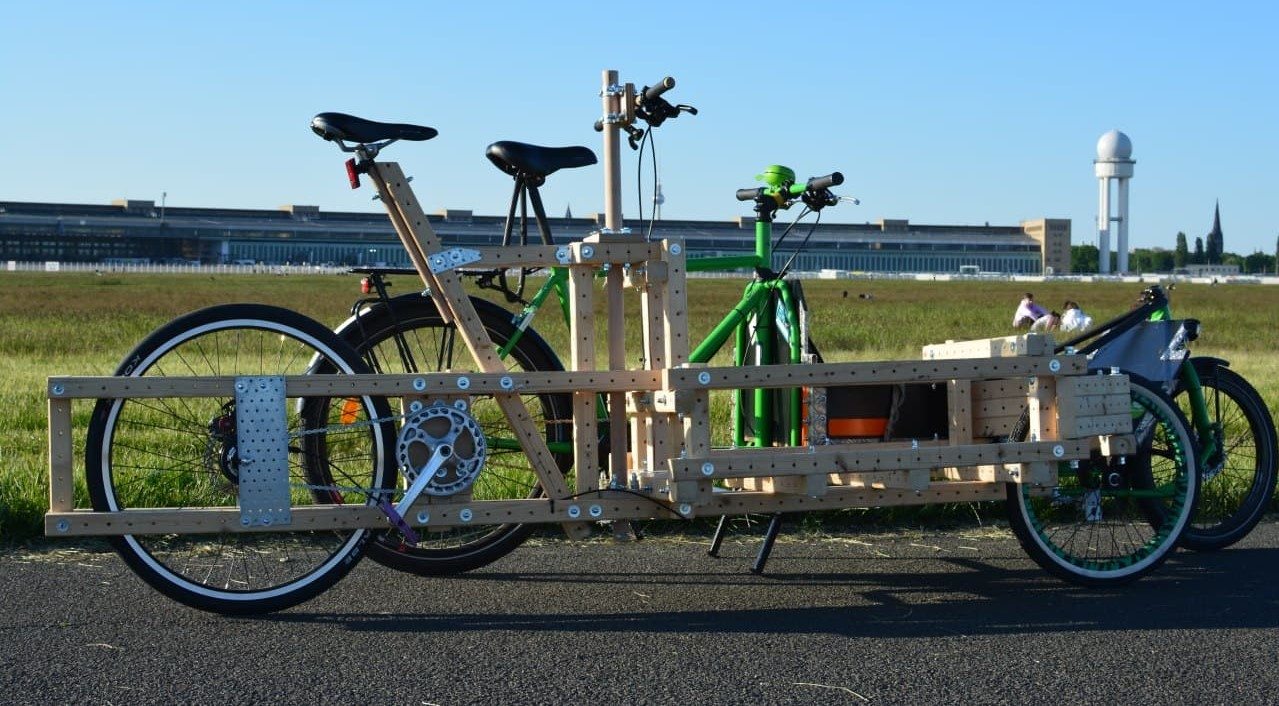
Gridbeam cargo bike with duplex steering

Bastiaen cargo bike with steering knuckle

=== Longtail bicycle ===
Longtails have a longer frame wheelbase at the rear compared to a standard bicycle. The extended rear facilitates use as a cargo bike or carrying multiple or adult passengers compared with shorter bicycles. They tend to handle more like regular bikes than cargo bikes with linkage steering.

Xtracycle developed their first longtail product, their Free Radical, which attaches to an existing 'donor' bicycle to make it a longtail bike in 1998. The growing popularity of Xtracycle inspired the Kona Ute, launched for the 2008 season. Surly were asked by Xtracycle to build a complete Xtracycle-compatible frameset; the result was the 'Big Dummy', first released for the 2008 season. The chromoly frameset is designed for 660 mm (26 in) wheels. Buyers have the choice of frameset alone or complete bicycle. In 2008 Xtracycle documented the LongTail as an open-source standard. This has helped individuals to build longtail bikes themselves such as the Xtravois.

There is a sub-class of longtail bicycles referred to as midtails. As their name implies, they are not quite as long as a longtail, but can still often carry at least one if not two children. The distinction between both is not clear and there are longer tailed bikes sold as midtail, while shorter are categorized as longtail.

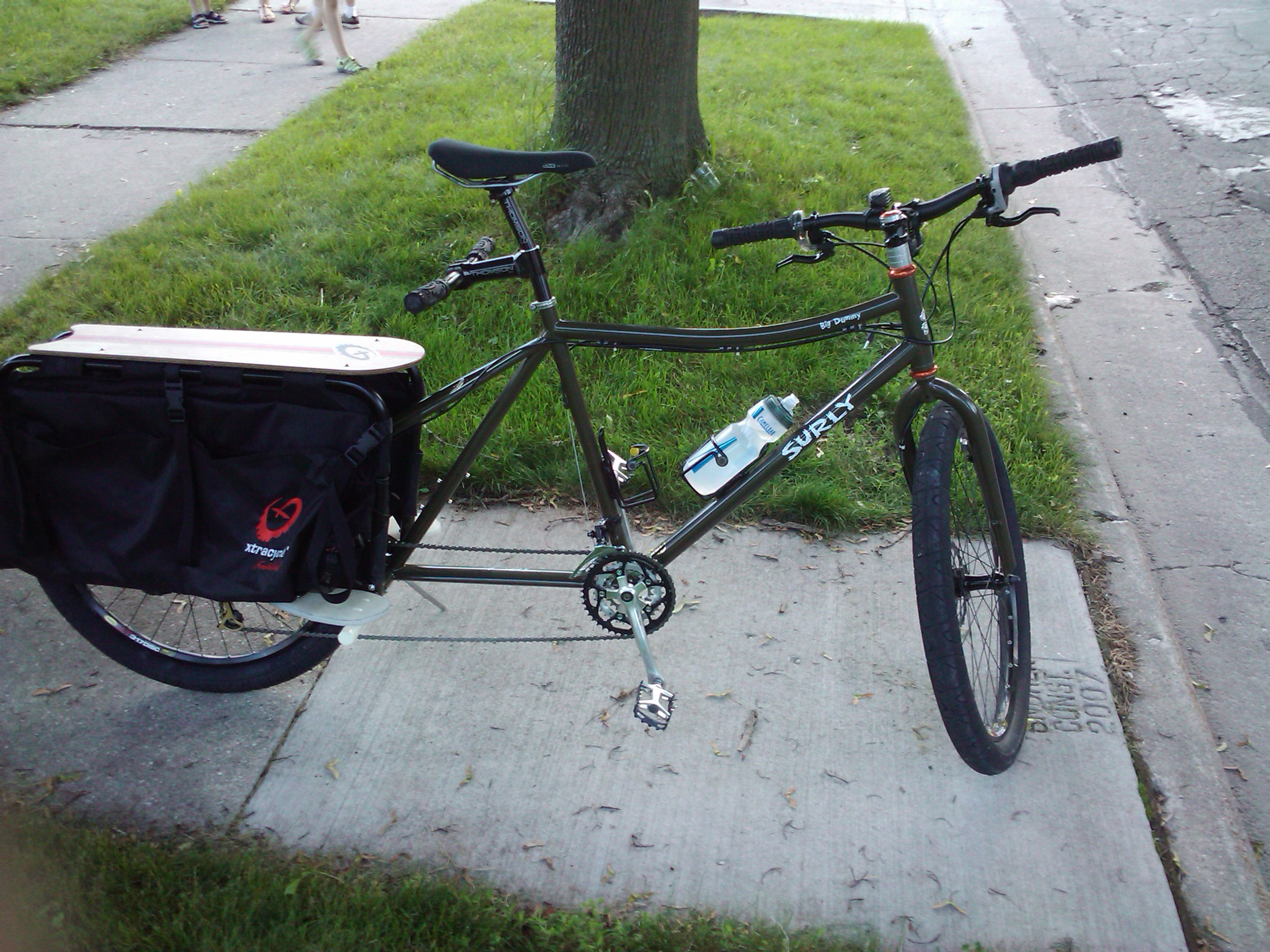
A Surly Big Dummy with handlebars and foot rests for a second rider

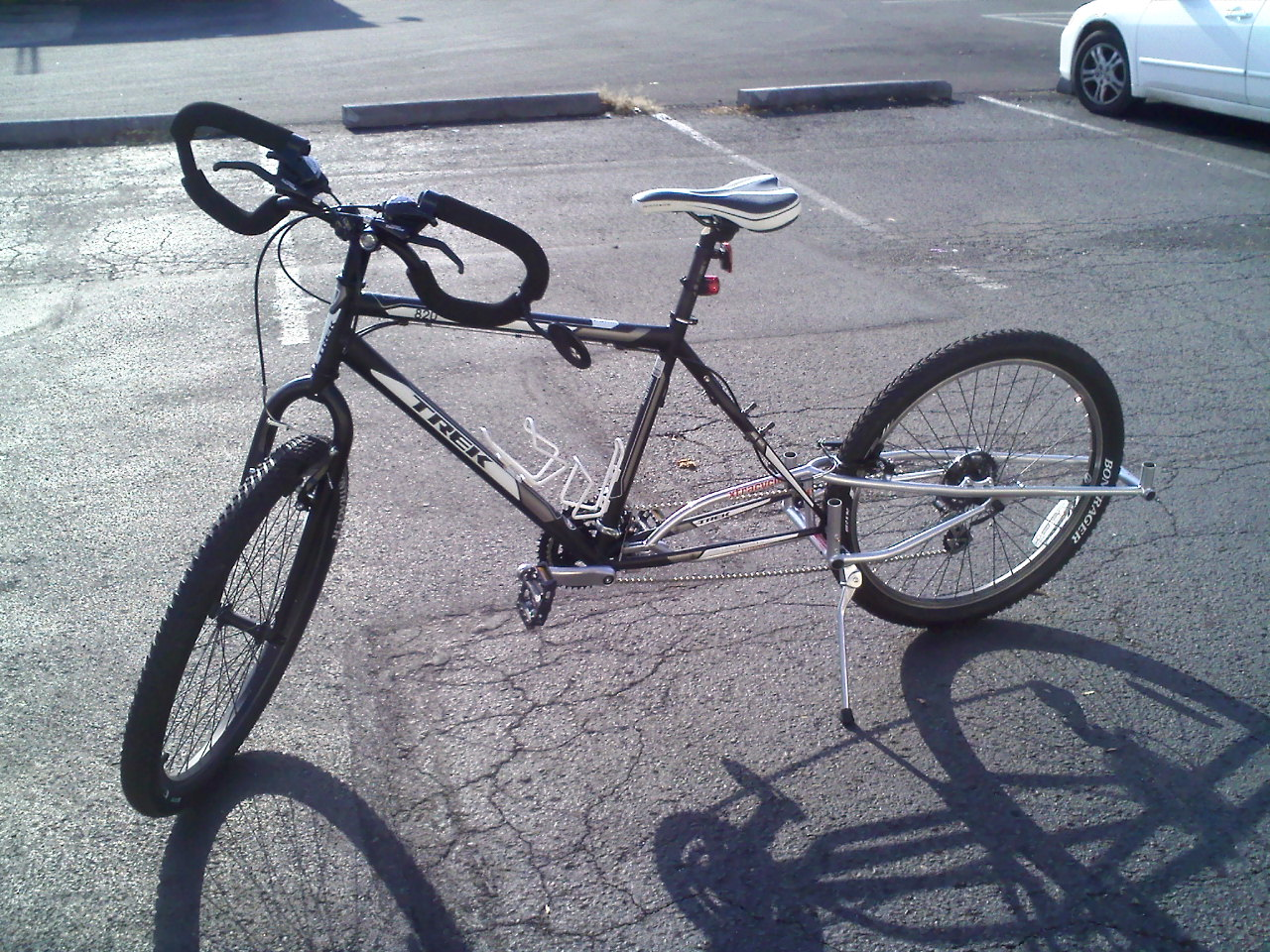
Xtracycle Free Radical as fitted to a Trek 820 MTB donor bike.

=== Wooden cargo bike ===
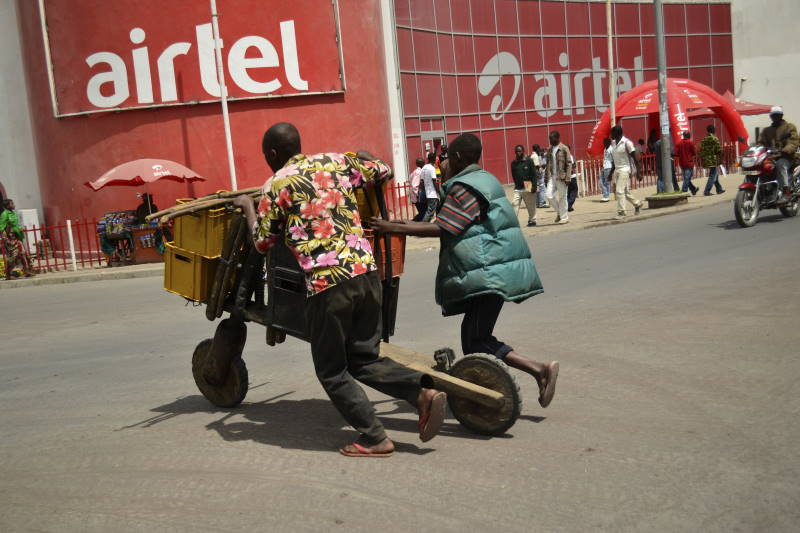
Chukudu

The chukudu (or chikudu, cbokoudou) is a two-wheeled vehicle similar to a scooter used in the east of the Democratic Republic of Congo. It is made of wood, and used for transporting cargo.

=== Tricycle ===
Cycle rickshaws and other cargo tricycles are used for short range transport of both people and goods while tricycles with boxes or platforms are used to transport goods. A cargo tricycle with an open or flat platform might be used for low value goods or for trips where the rider is always with the goods. A fabric cover can be added to provide weather protection. Tricycles can also be fitted with a lockable weatherproof box, usually of aluminium construction, for valuable goods and where the rider has to leave the vehicle.

Cargo tricycles can typically carry 100–300 kilograms (220–660 lb) of cargo and have capacity of 1 m^{3} (35 cu ft) or more, which is about half the capacity of a small panel van. The weight capacity of tricycles is limited by available human power and the permitted power of electric assist by law.

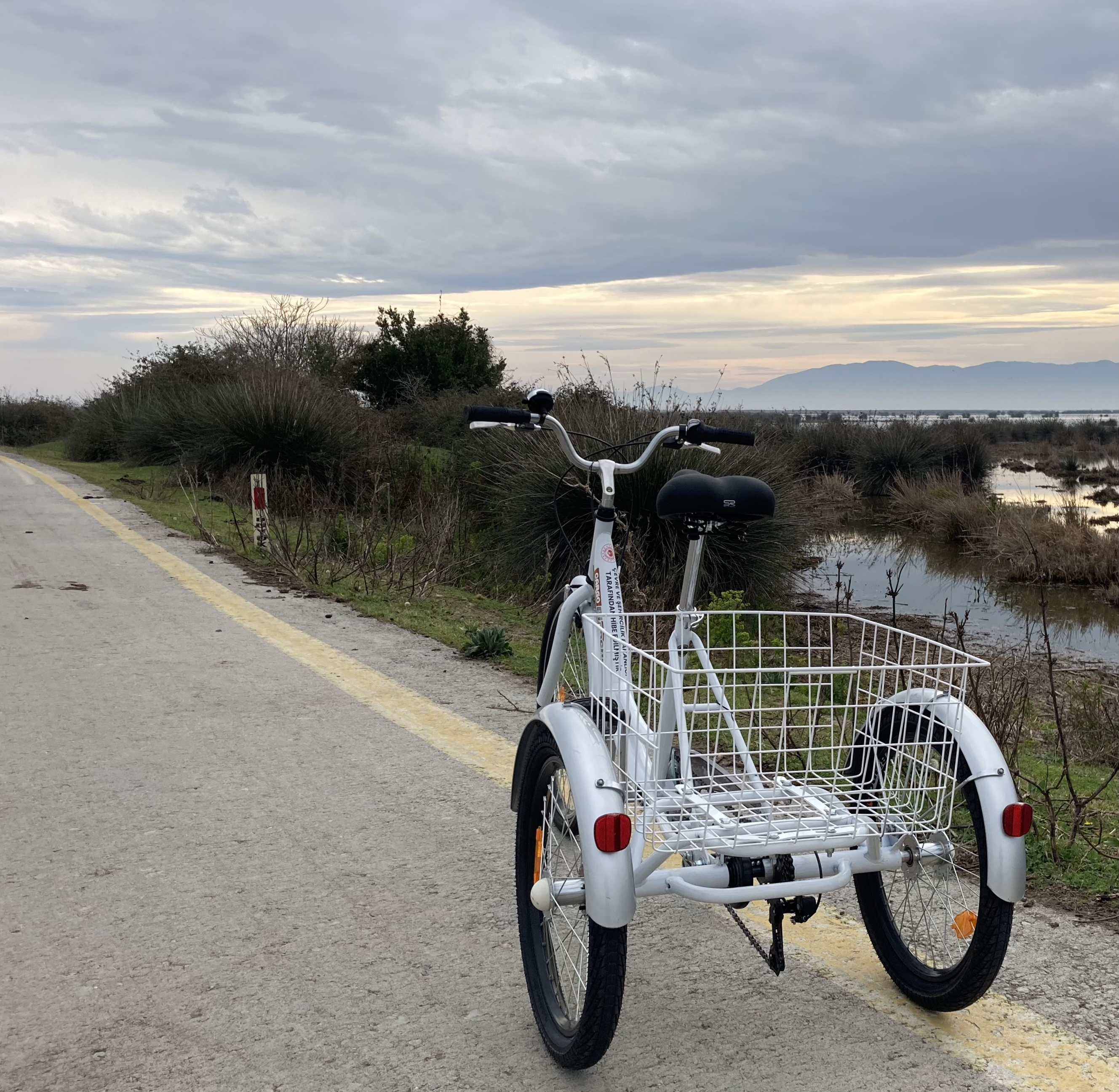
Freight trike

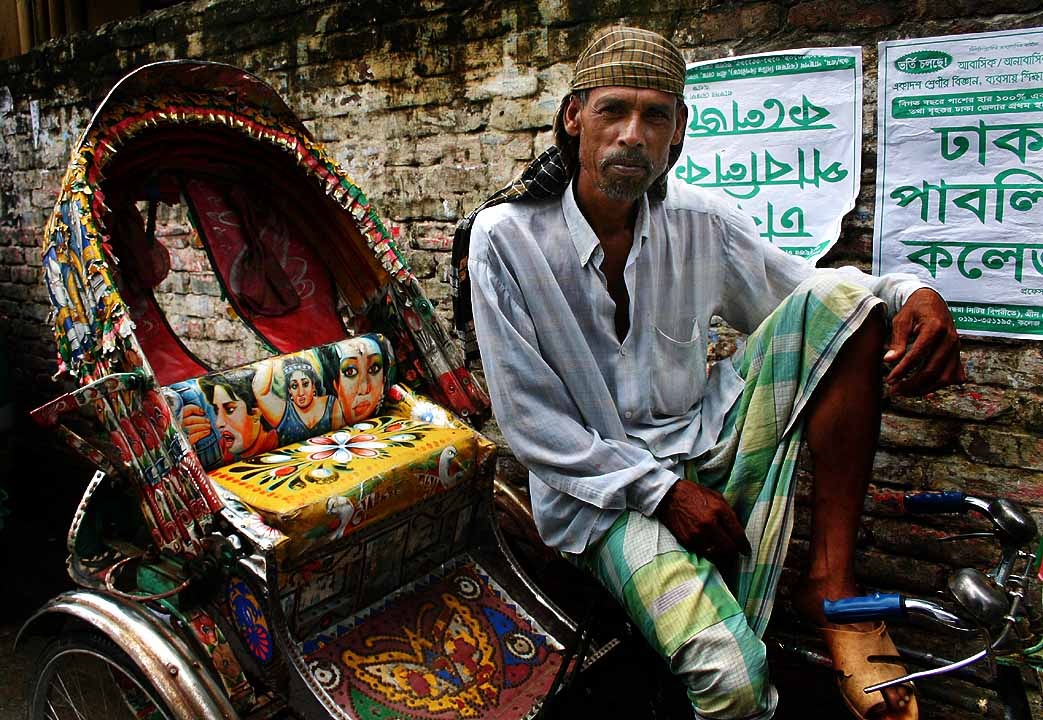
Cycle rickshaw in Dhaka

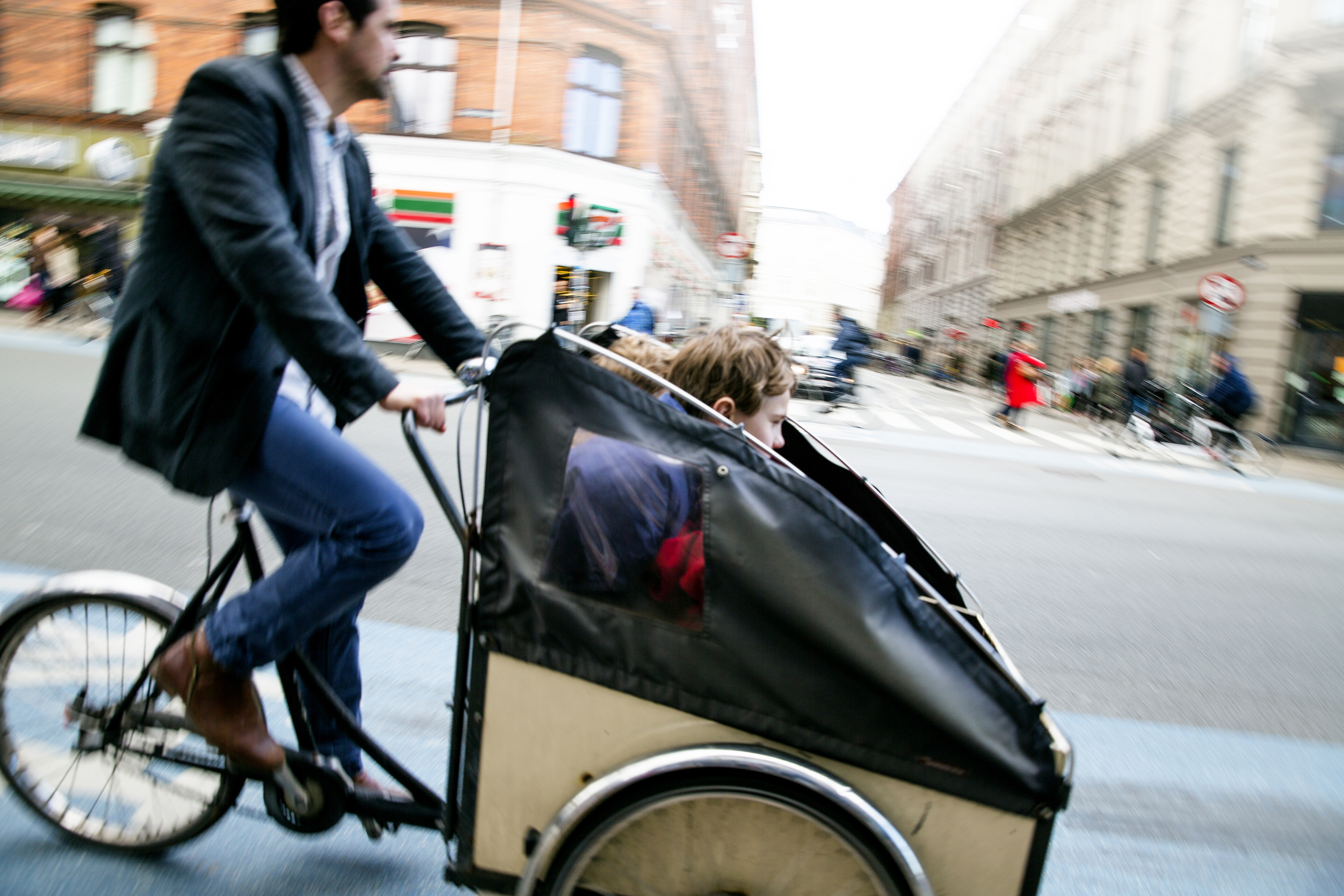
Cargo trike, Copenhagen (2013)

== Gallery ==
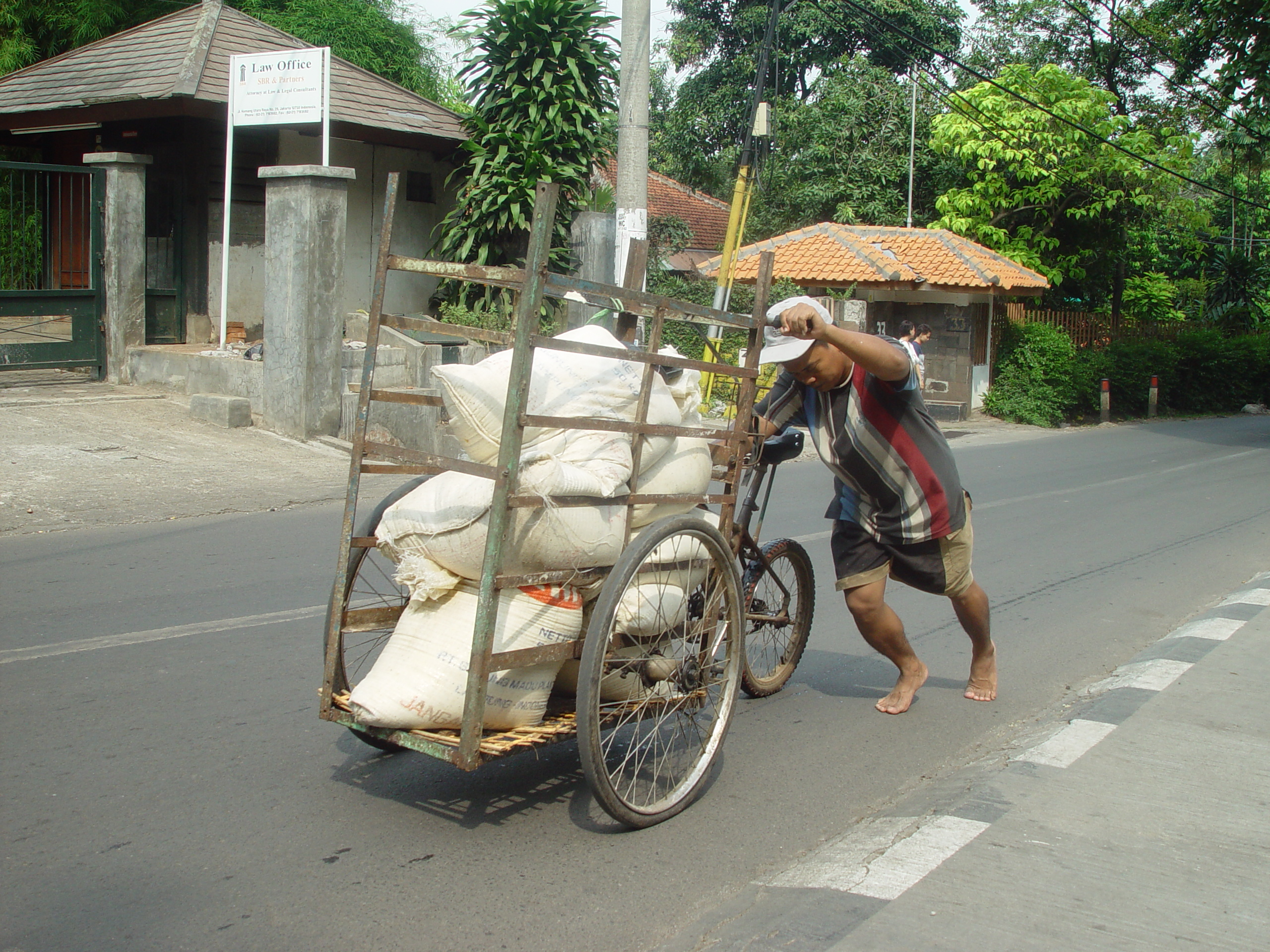
A loaded cargo trike being pushed in Jakarta, Indonesia

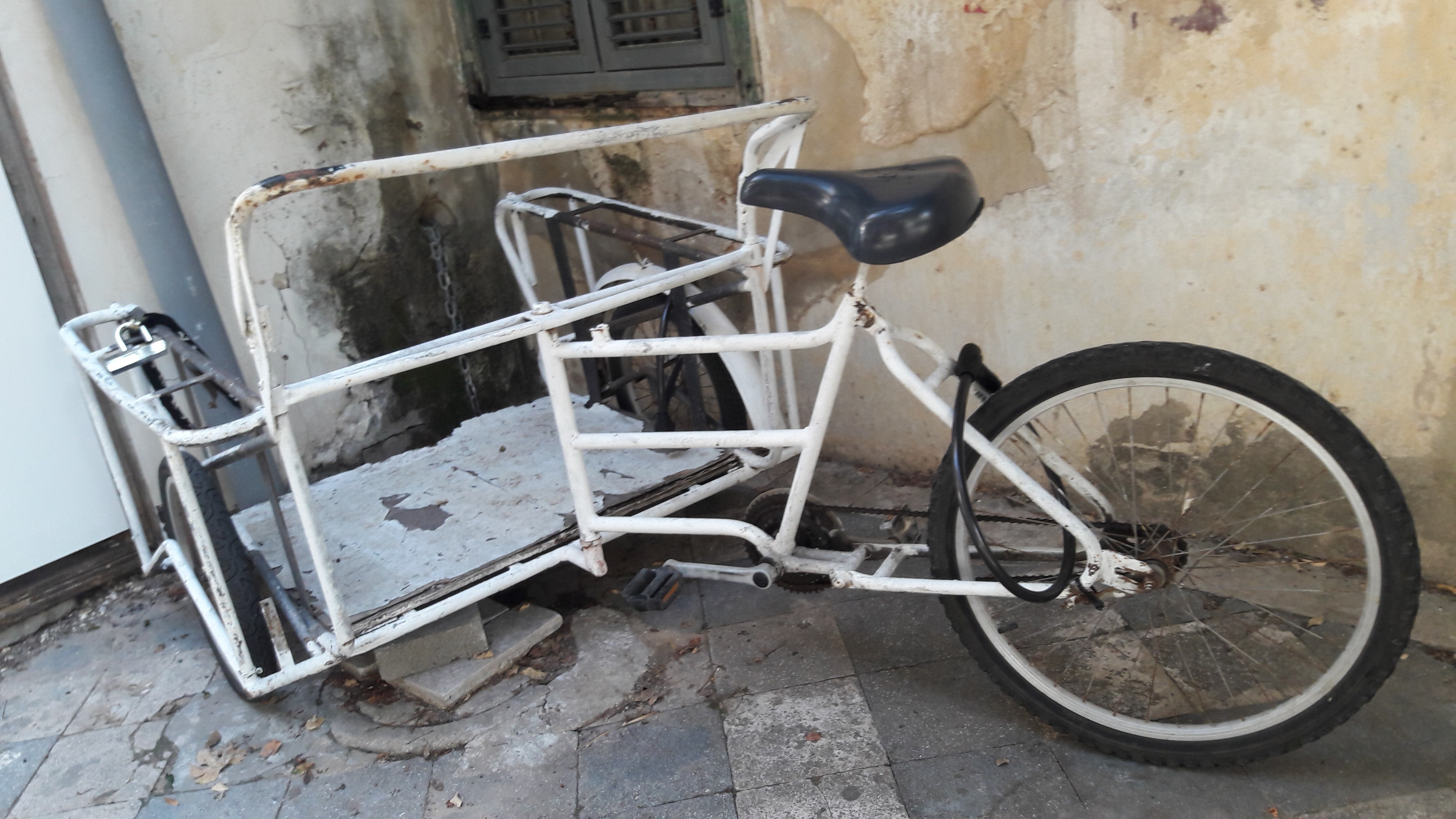
An old cargo trike in Tel Aviv, Israel

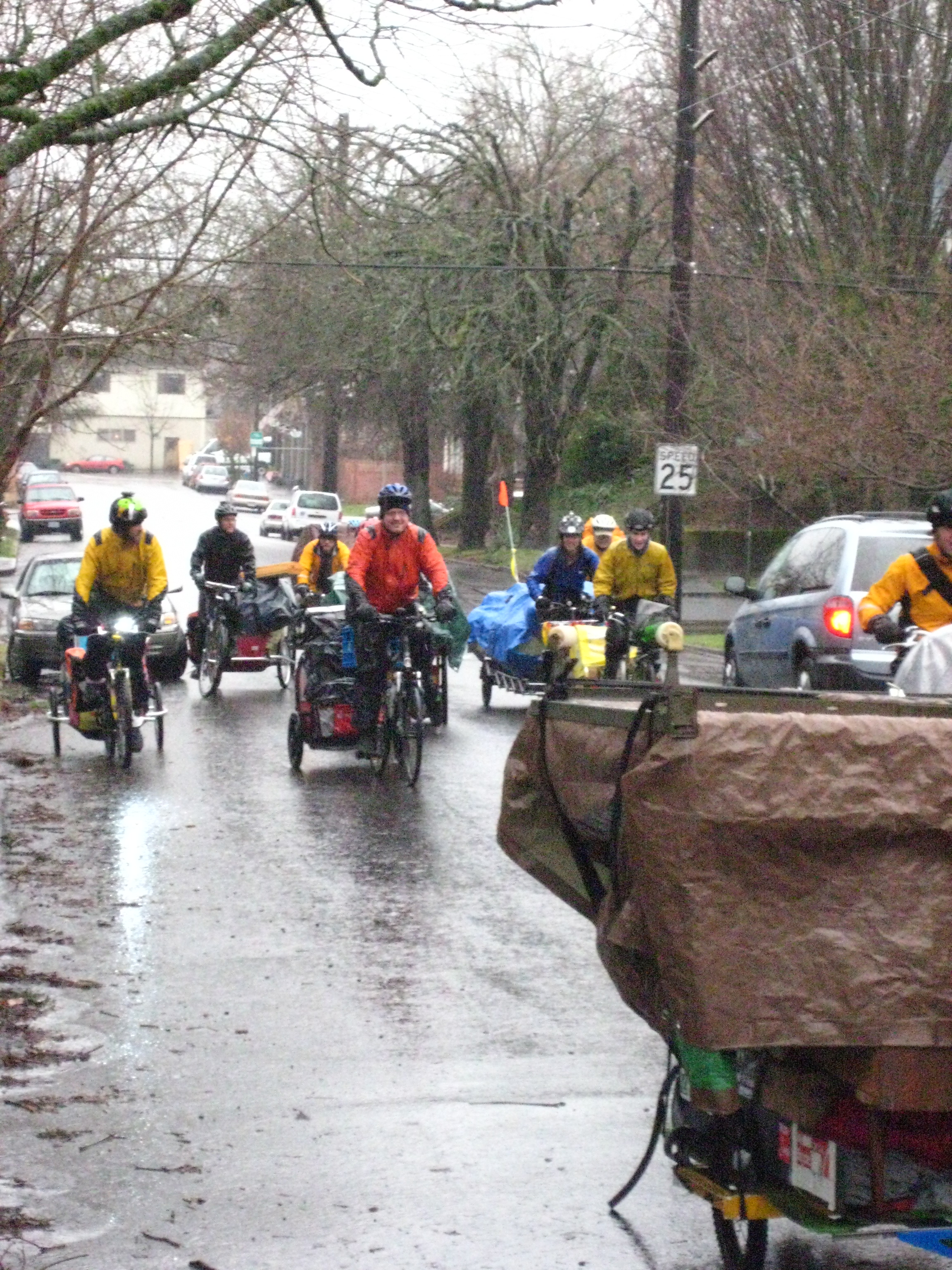
Cyclists in Portland, Oregon, move a household by bike

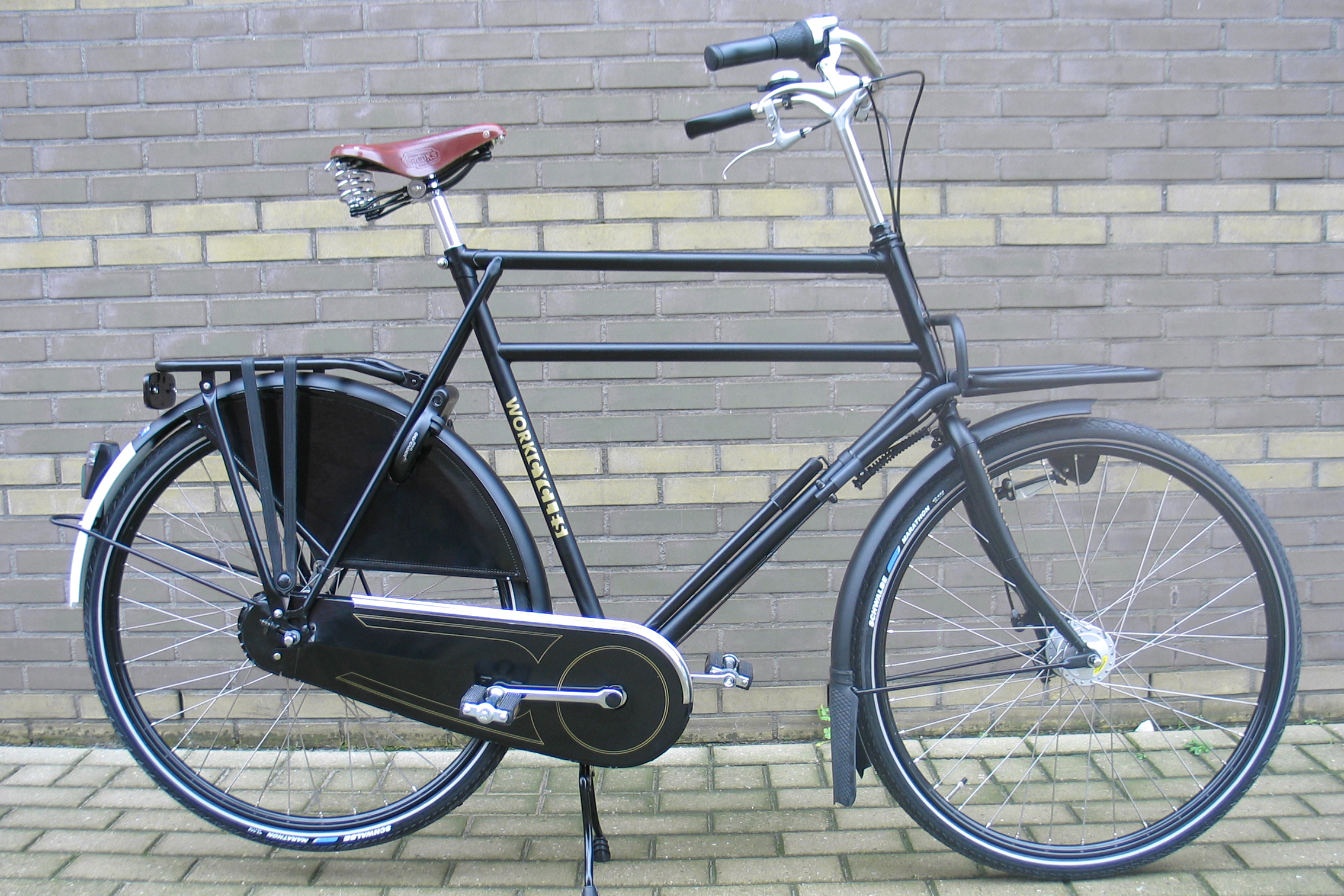
Heavy-duty city bike with frame-mounted front carrier known as a "semi-transportfiets" (Dutch for semi-transport bicycle)

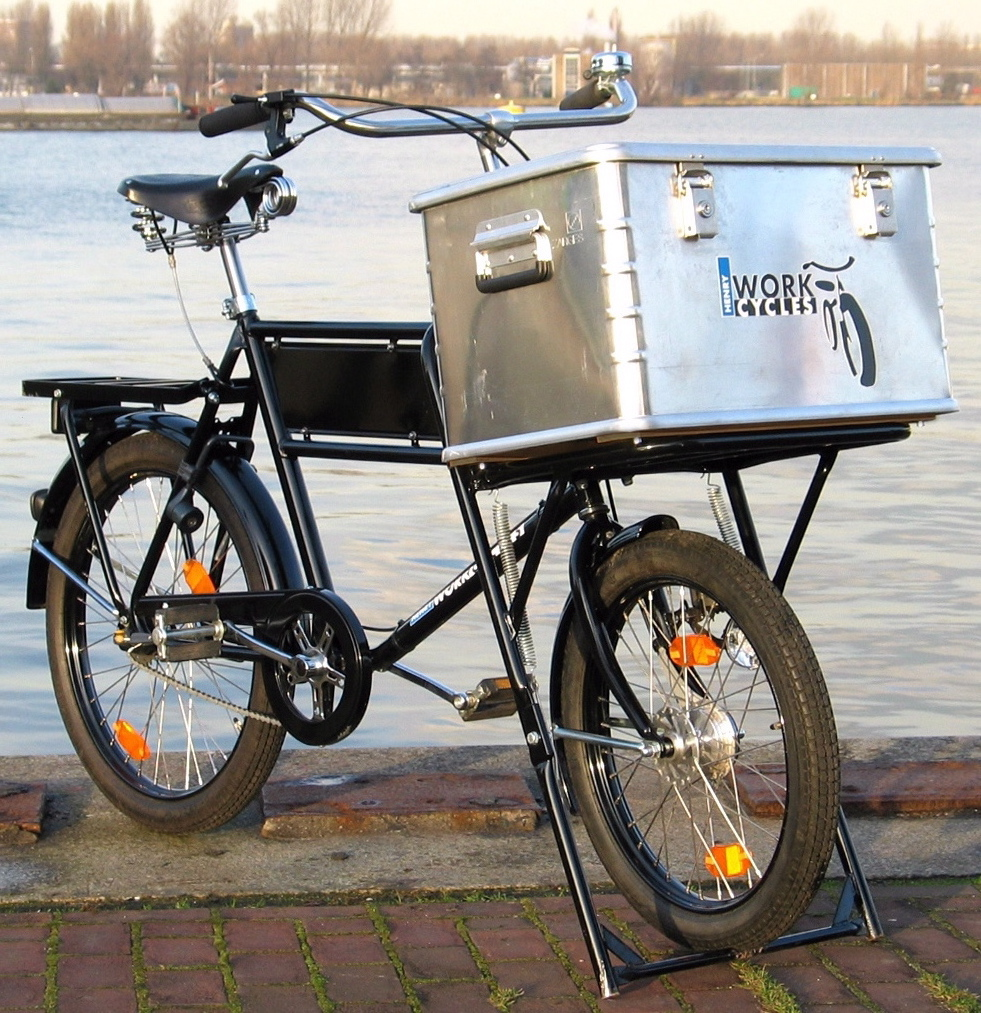
Classic Monark Swedish baker's bike, this one with locking aluminium case on the frame-mounted front carrier

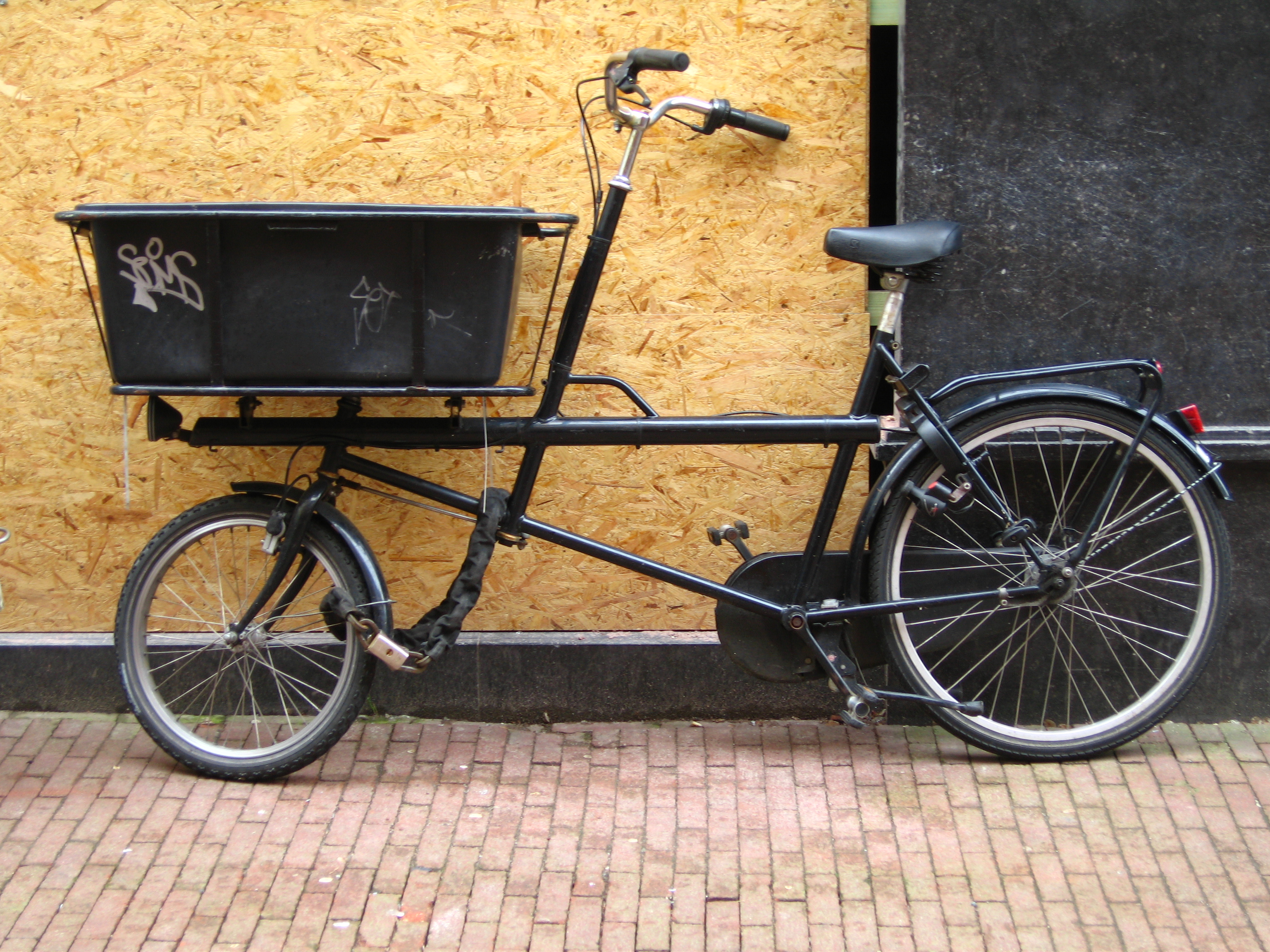
Somewhat heavier bike, steered by linkage. Amsterdam, Netherlands.

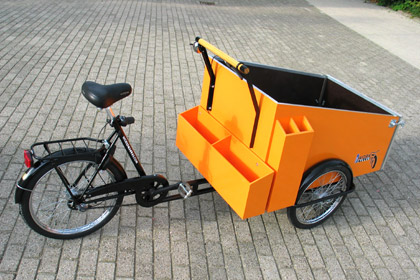
Cargo trike specially equipped for street cleaning crews; The side and rear compartments carry pick-up sticks, bag holders and other gear.

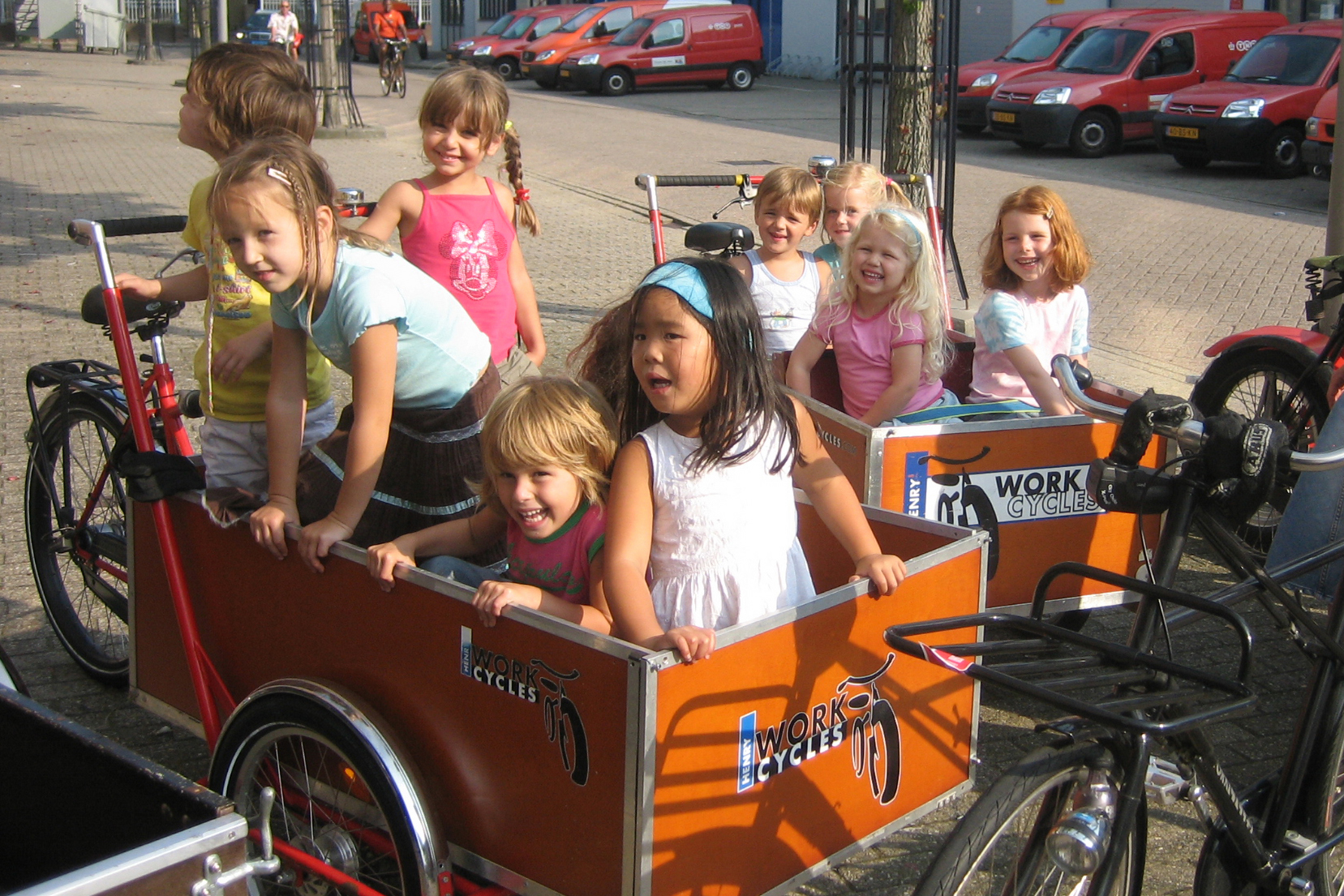
Child transport is a popular use of cargo bikes, and numerous special models are offered.

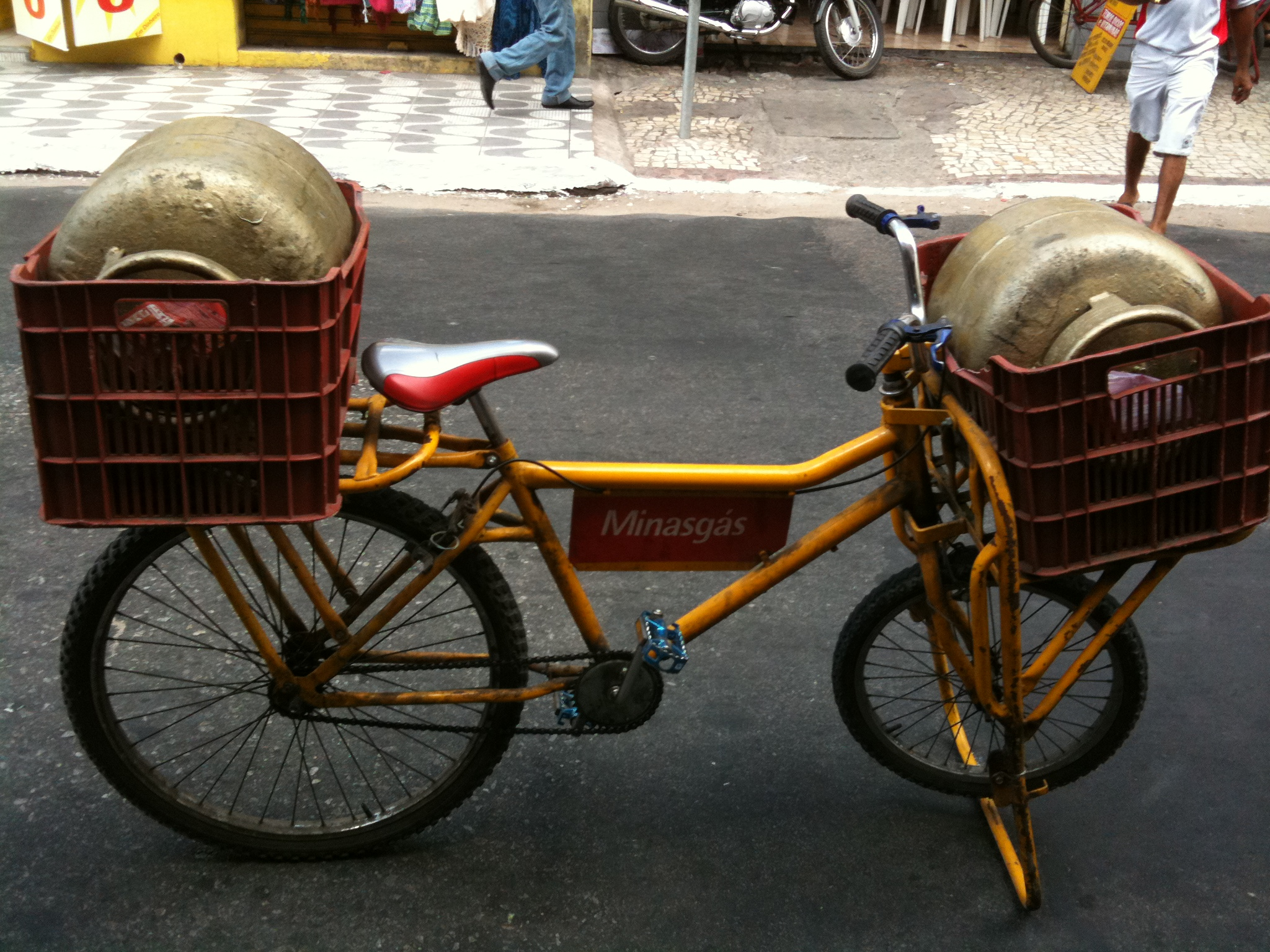
Brazilian cargo bikes are very strong and commonly carry large propane containers, 5×75-litre water jugs, etc.

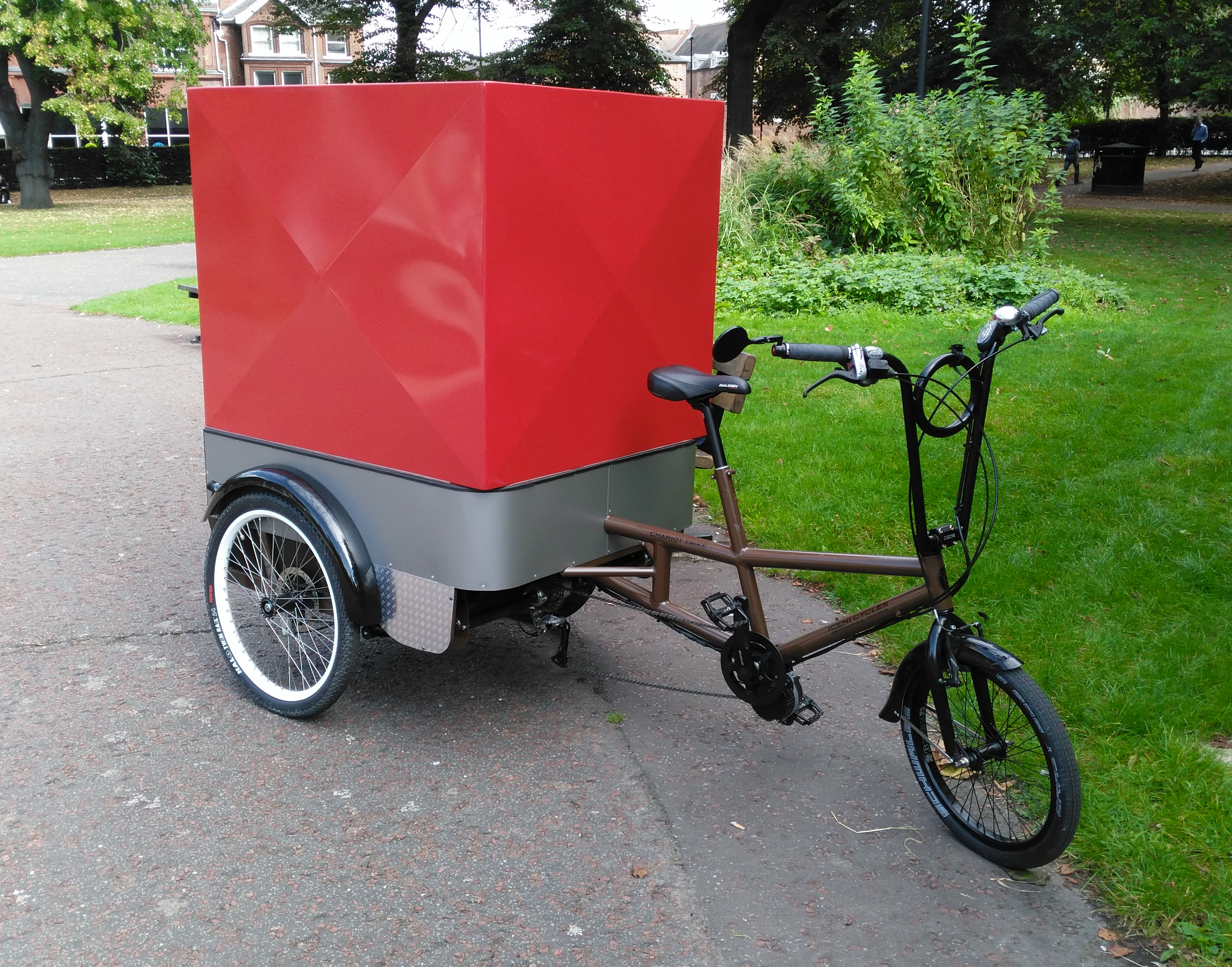
An Iceni Cycles Chariot trike with aluminium box for local delivery work.

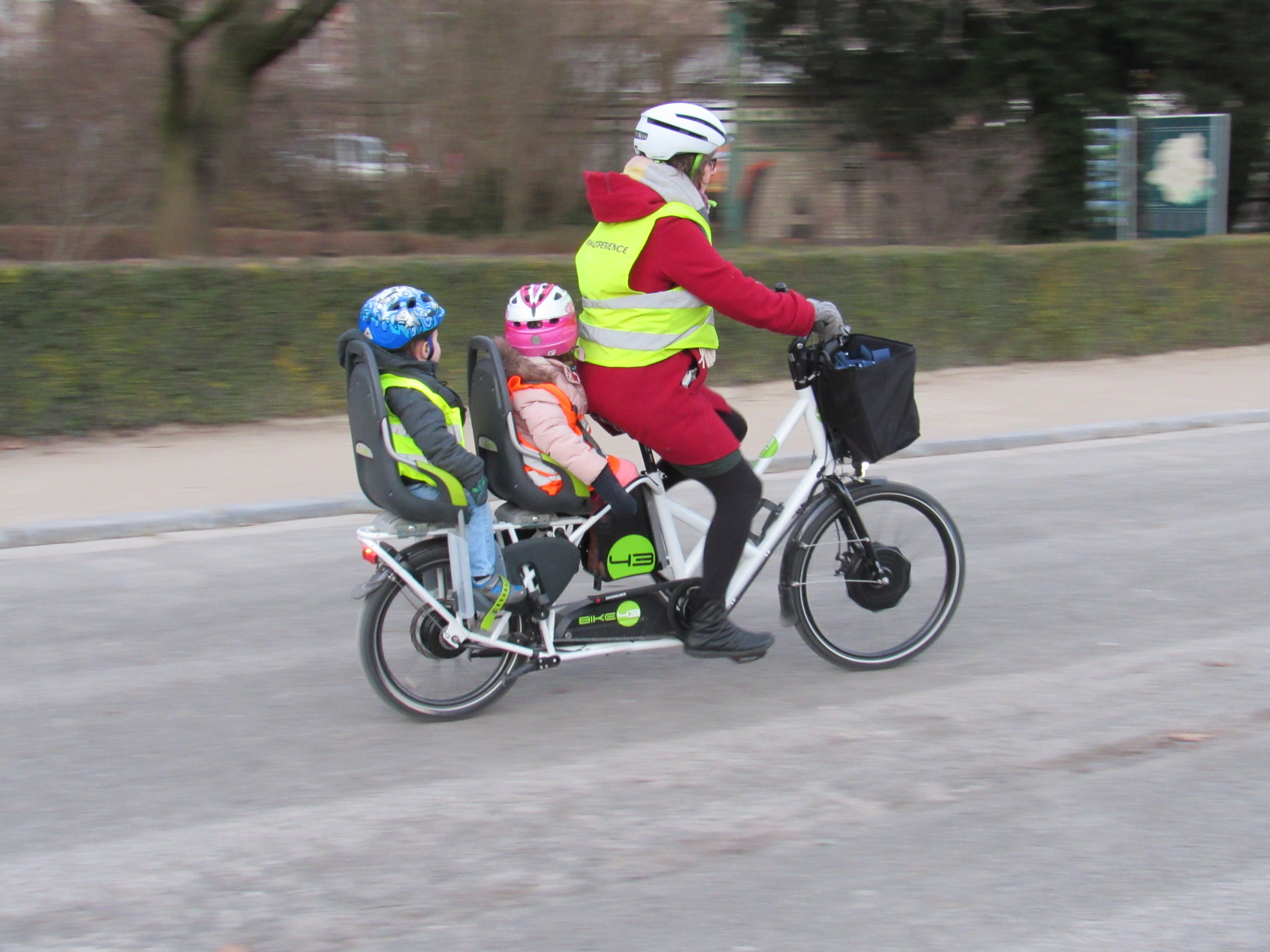
A Bike43 longtail ebike carrying two children

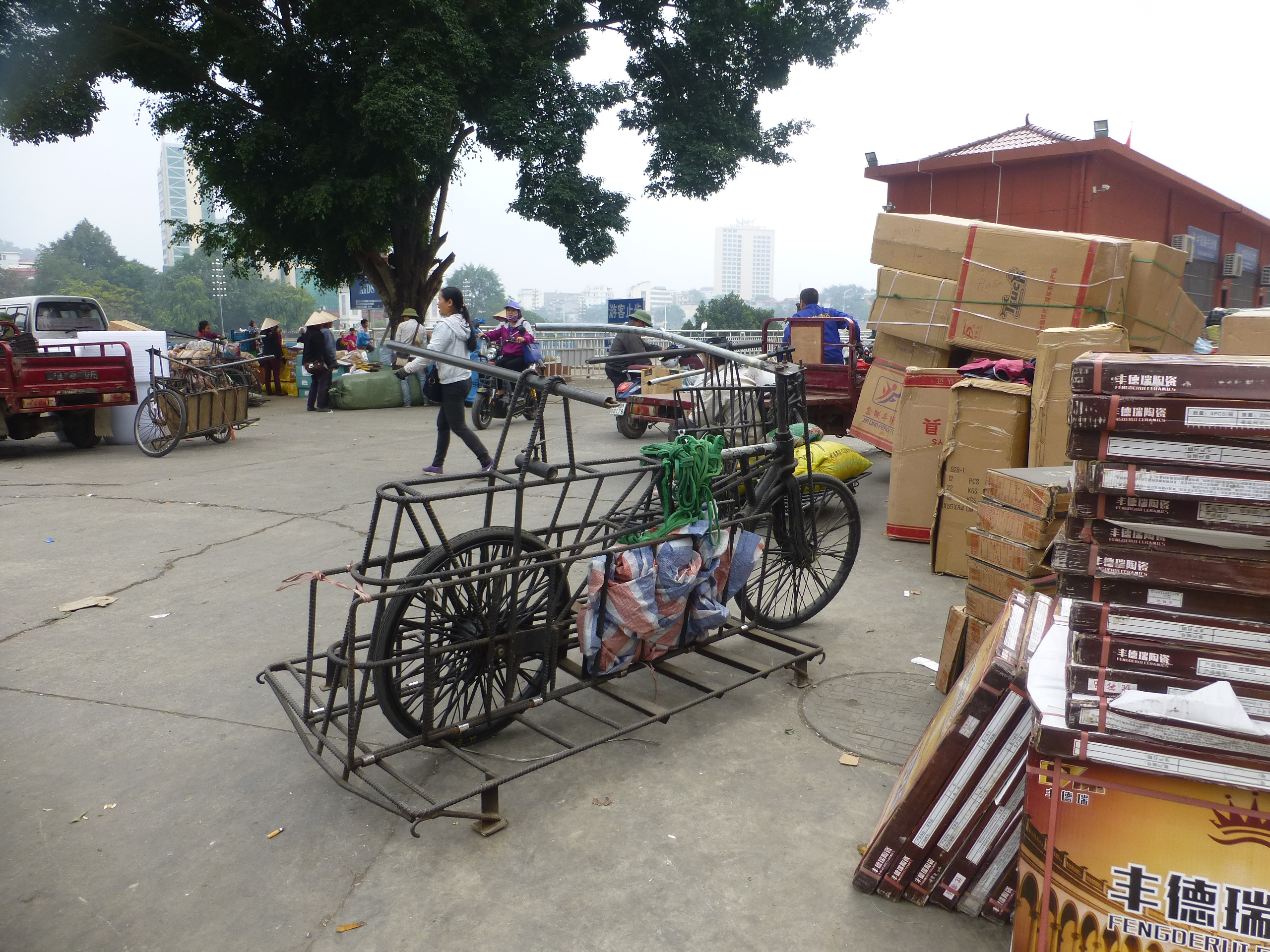
Vietnamese cargo bikes, used to move freight across the Hekou-Lào Cai border crossing

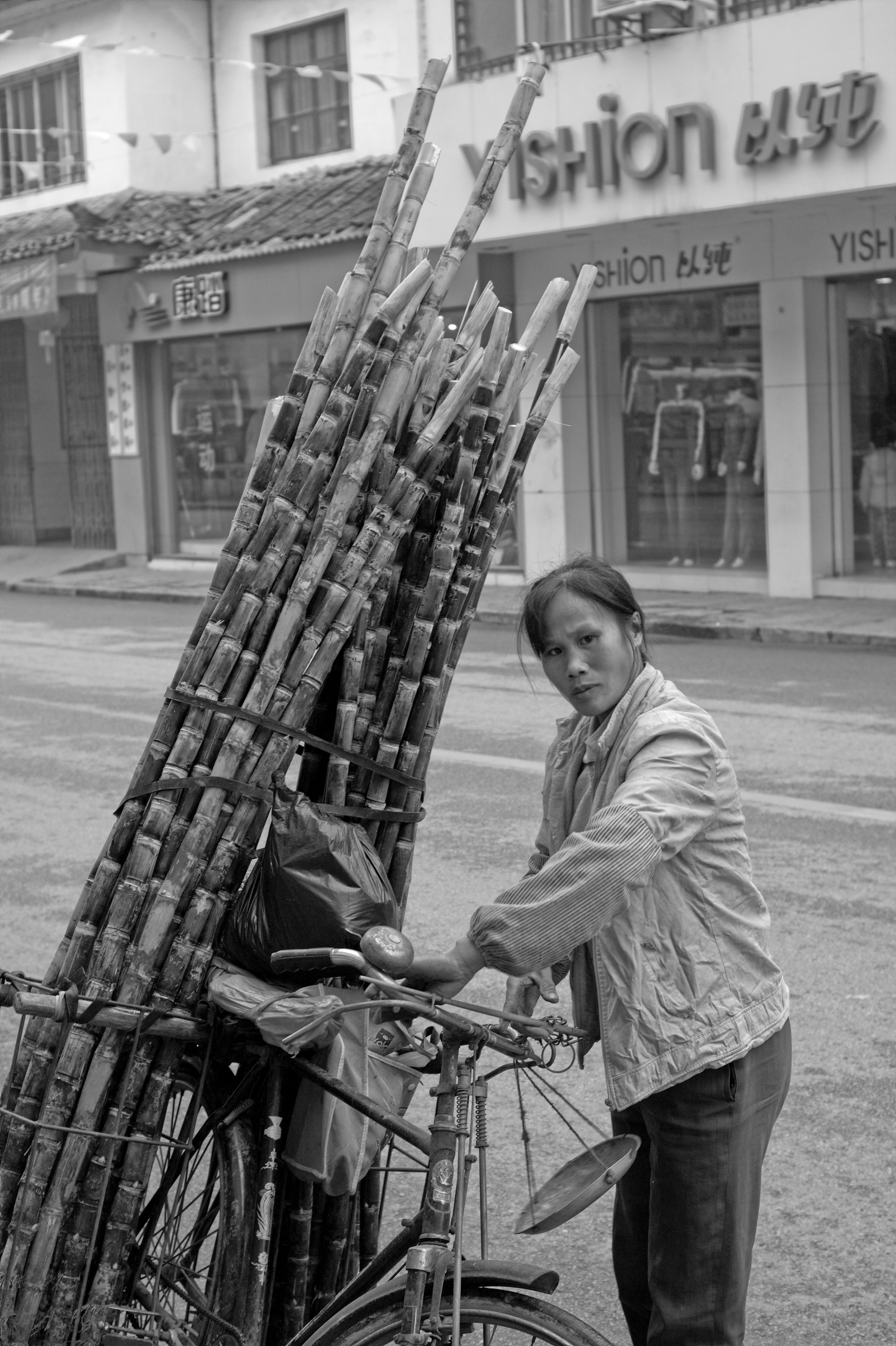
Chinese Cargo Bicycle

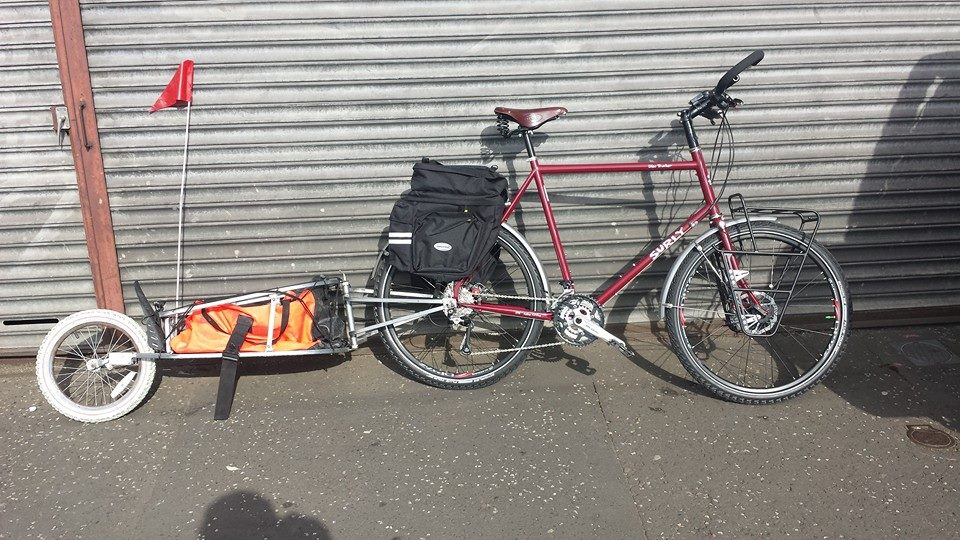
A bike made by Surly with a single-wheel bike trailer

== See also ==
- Cyclologistics
- Cargo bike racing, bicycle race using cargo bikes
- Bicycle trailer
- Electric bicycle
- Human-powered transport
- Outline of cycling
- Quadracycle (human-powered vehicle)
