= Cargo tricycle =

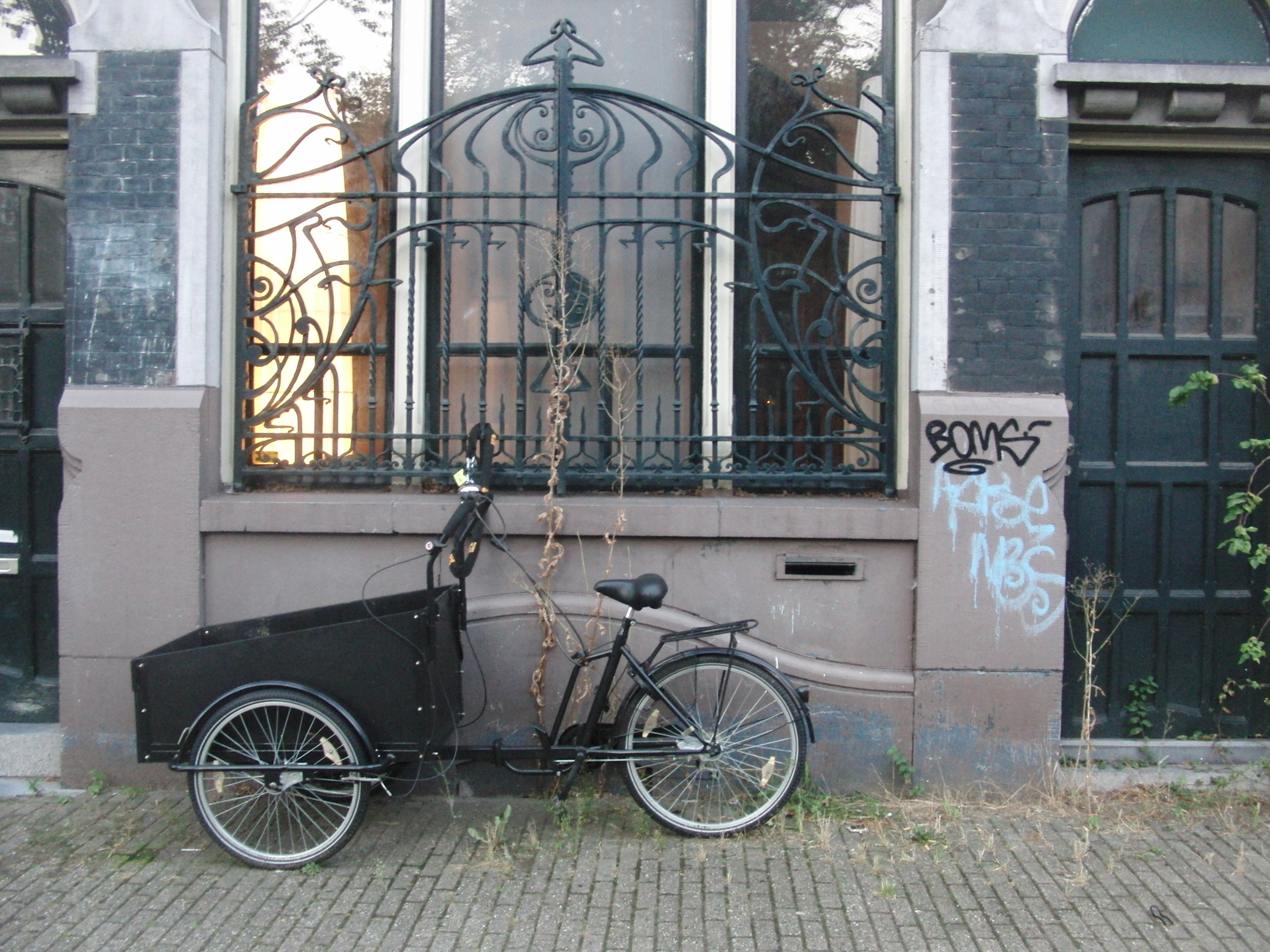
3-wheel cargo bike in Amsterdam (2009)

A cargo tricycle or transport tricycle is a type of cargo bike that has historically been used for the transport of goods, and more recently also for transport of children. It can stand on its own when parked and is stable at low speeds. However, they often have poor stability at high speed as most simple models are not able to lean into the turn to shift the center of gravity. However, there are some cargo tricycles with advanced suspension that allows for some roll which alleviates some of the stability problems at high speed.

A tadpole configuration is a three-wheel cargo bike with two front wheels, and usually either a large flat or a large box at the front for carrying luggage. The box can also be replaced by seats so that passengers can be transported with it. Although bakfiets is the Dutch word for cargo bike in general, it has traditionally mainly been used for such three-wheeled cargo bikes with two front wheels. In Flanders, such three-wheel cargo bikes are often called triporteur, which is probably a combination of tricycle (three-wheeled bicycle) or tricar (three-wheeler) and transporteur (transporter). On the other hand, two-wheel cargo bikes (like Long John's) are called biporteur or Deense bakfiets ("Danish cargo bike"). A delta configuration is the reverse version of a tricycle (i.e. having one front wheel and two rear wheels), and is often used on cycle rickshaws or bicycles for the mentally disabled and people with poor balance.

Comparison of the delta and tadpole configuration

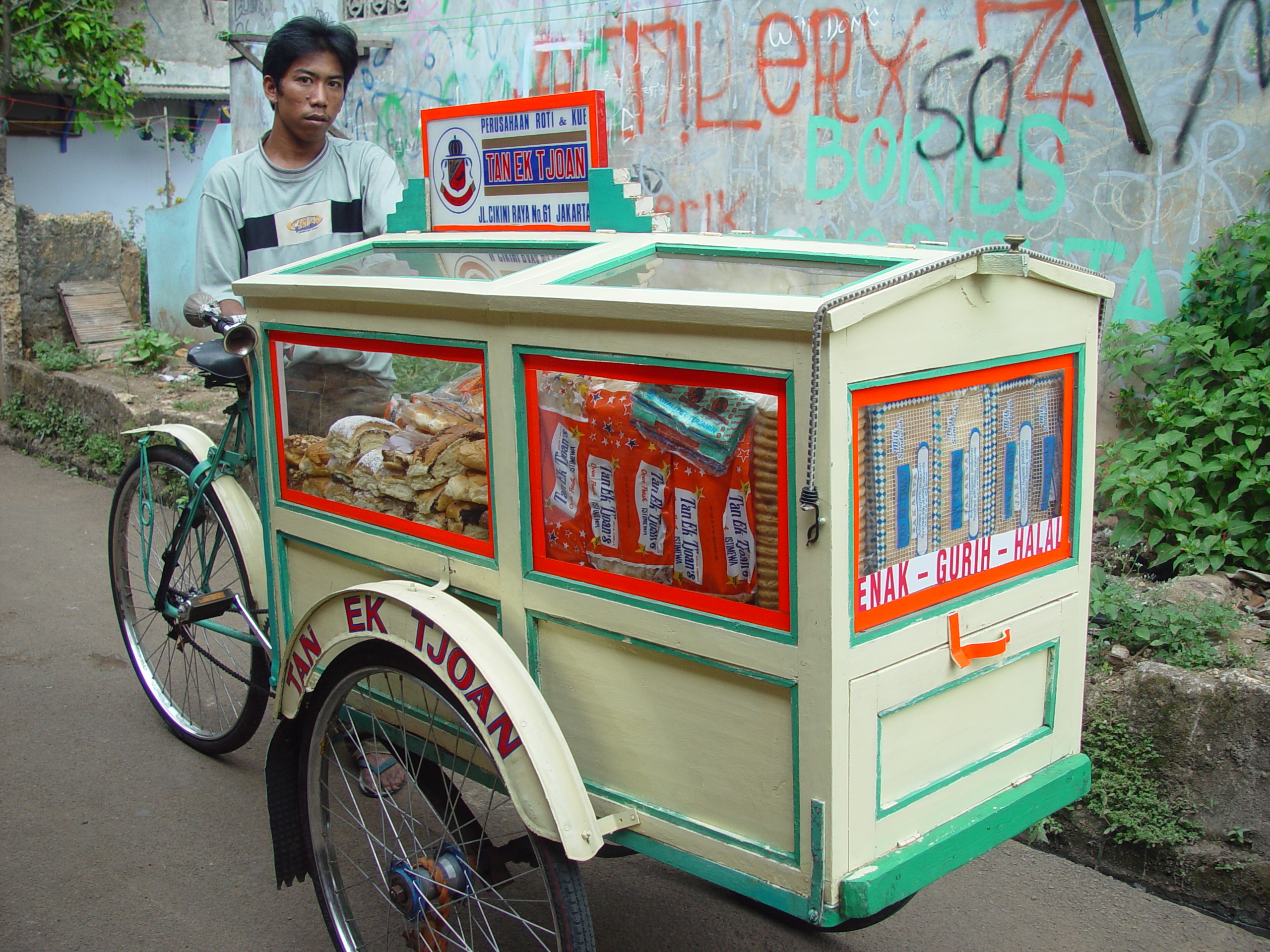
Bread seller in Indonesia (2004)

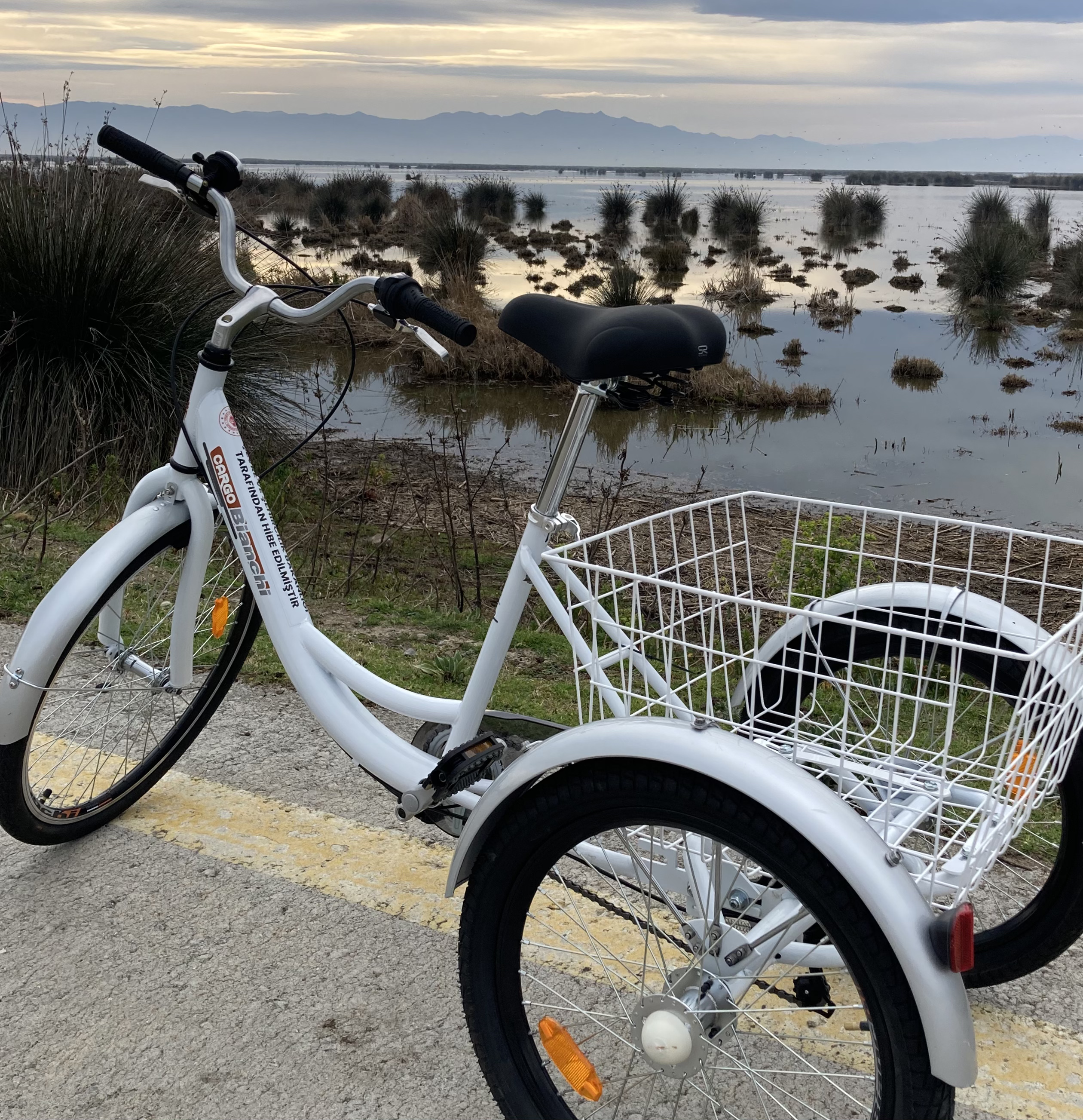
Cargo trike in delta configuration

== History ==
Cargo bikes in the tadpole configuration are considered the "traditional" type of cargo bike in the Netherlands and were common for commercial activities until the 1950s, before becoming popular again in recent times with families with children as an alternative to cars in the late 1990s and the beginning of the 2000s.

A traditional bakfiets usually has two white or yellow front lights and a red rear light, as well as front and rear reflectors. Non-motorized and pedelec cargo bikes have many similarities with purely motorized versions (where one does not need to pedal at all to get engine assistance), which are called cargo motor trikes (brombakfiets). Such mopeds were previously common for goods transport in the Western world (for example Harley-Davidson Servi-Car), but are today mostly used in developing countries.

International race for various categories of cargo bikes in North Brabant (1979)

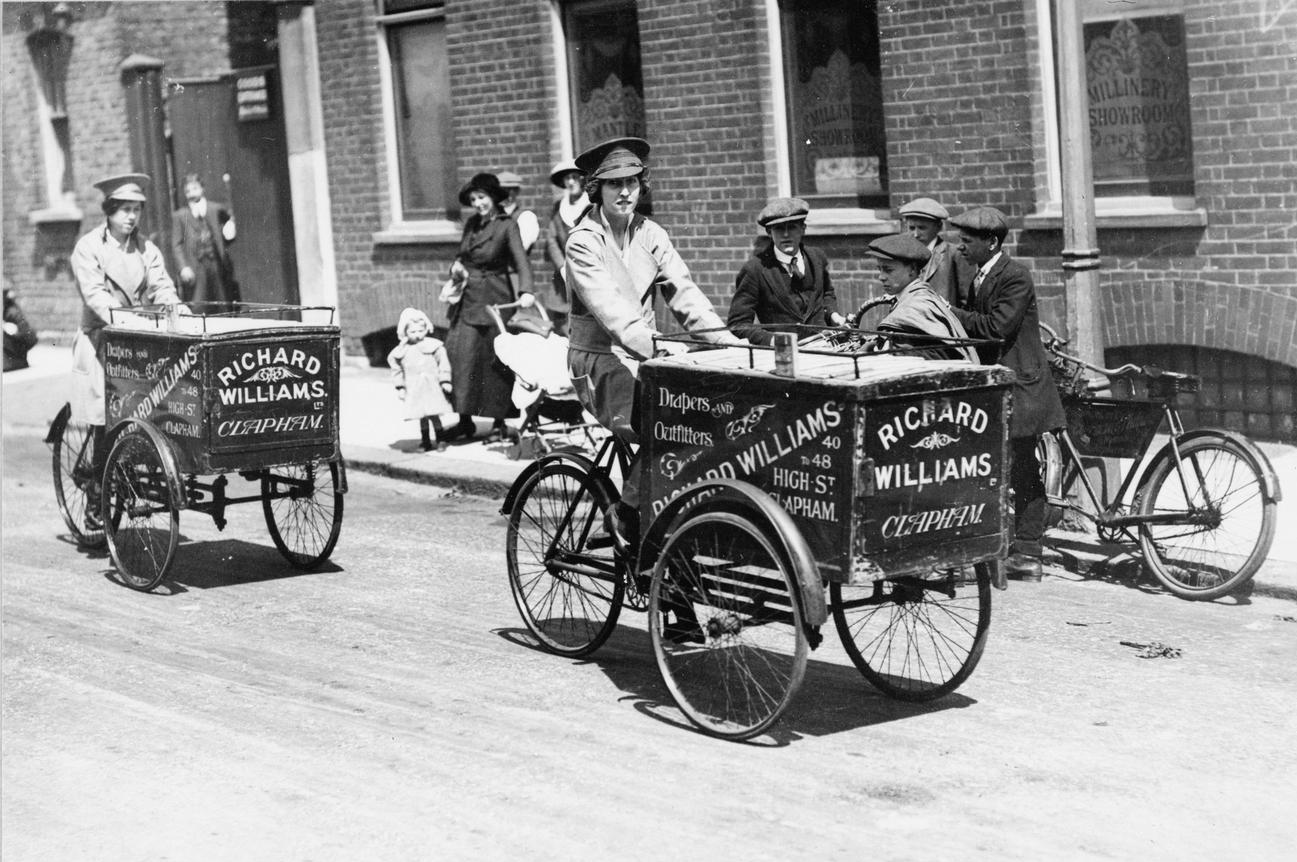
Two couriers making deliveries with cargo tricycles (1915)

== Steering and stability ==
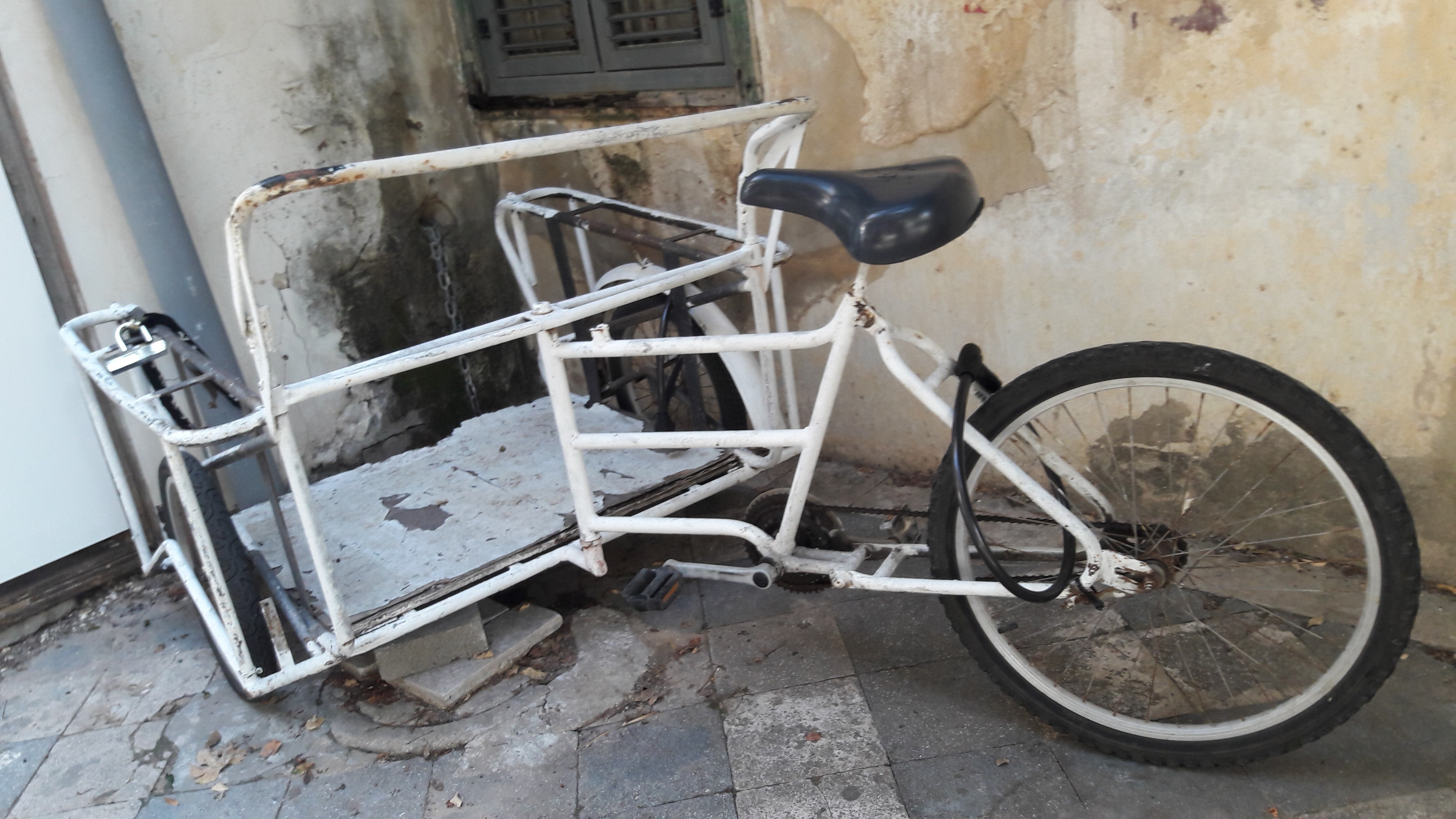
A simple cargo tricycle with its steering axis running through the center of the handlebar, and not through its front wheels

The steering on a traditional type of tadpole cargo bike is simple in construction, and the wheel is not steered around its own axis. Such bicycles are therefore often unstable and difficult to control at high speeds, and have therefore lost much of their popularity compared to other modern cargo bikes such as long Johns and longtails.

There are newer tadpole bicycles where the steering wheels turn around their own pivot axis, as well as with suspension that lets the bicycle roll such that the rider can lean into turns for better stability.

== See also ==
- Cyclologistics
- Long John, a two-wheel front-loading bicycle
- Longtail, a two-wheel rear-loading bicycle
