= Outline of bicycles =

Overview of and topical guide to bicycles

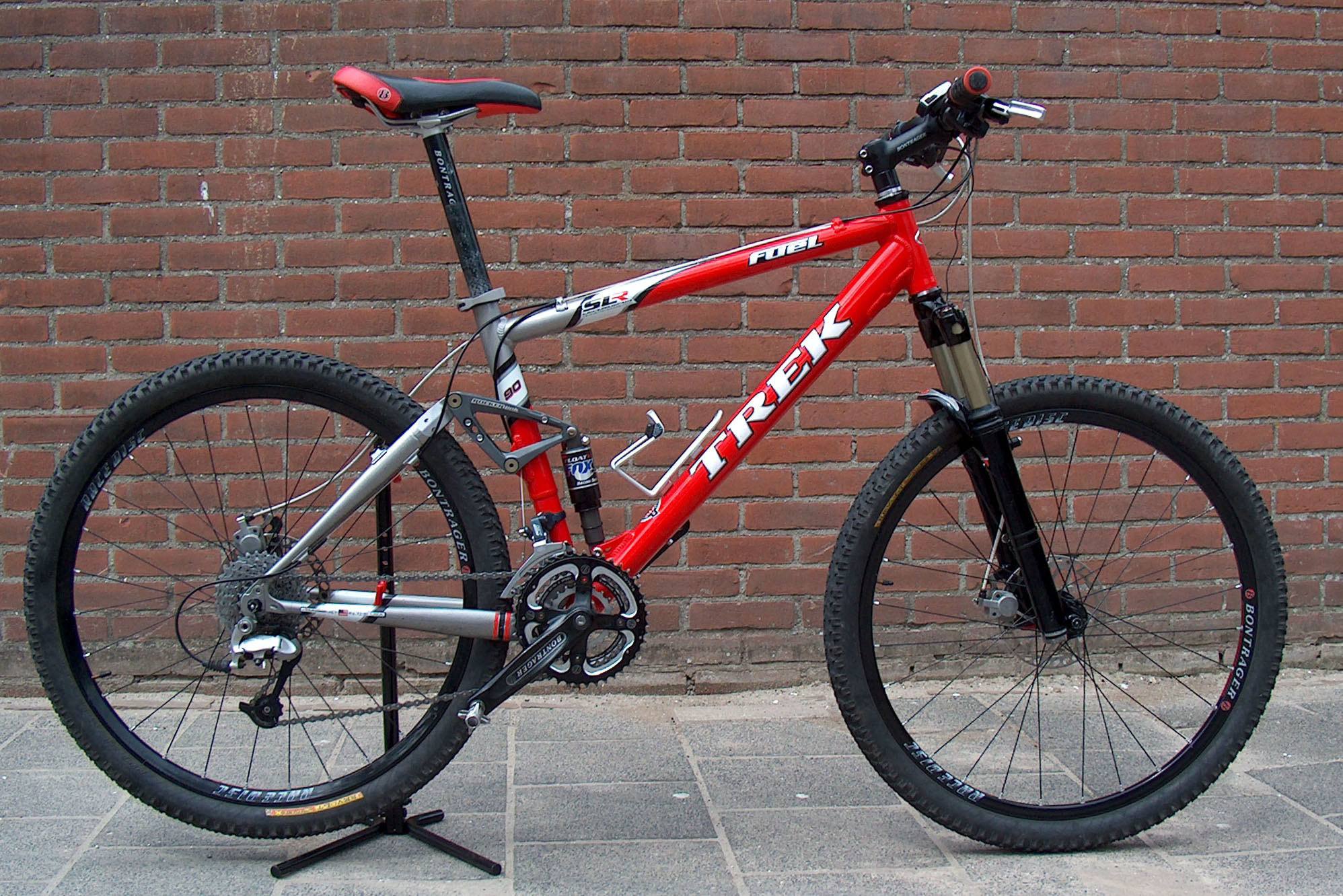
This mountain bicycle features oversized tires, a full-suspension frame, two disc brakes and handlebars oriented perpendicular to the bike's axis.

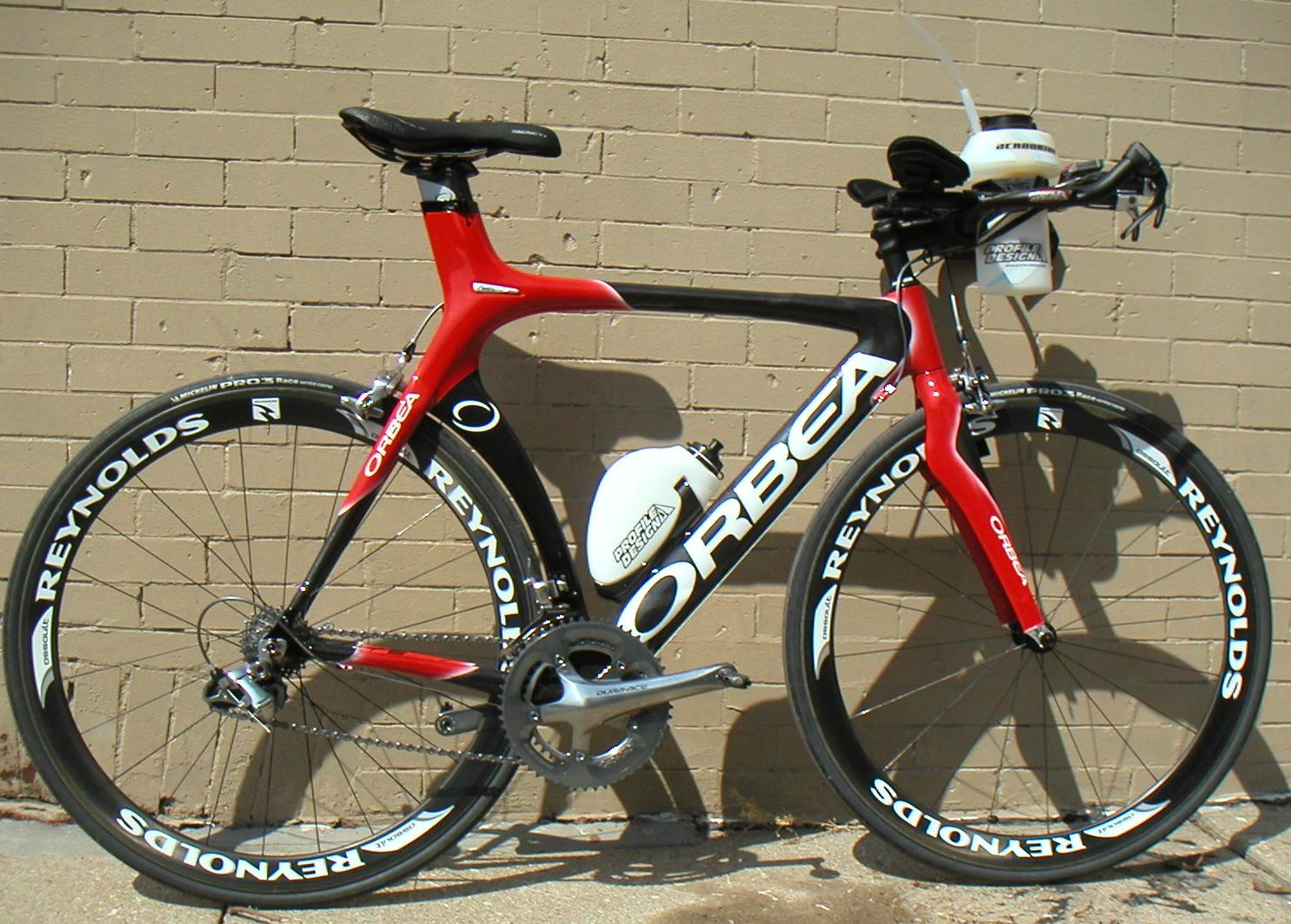
A time trial racing bicycle

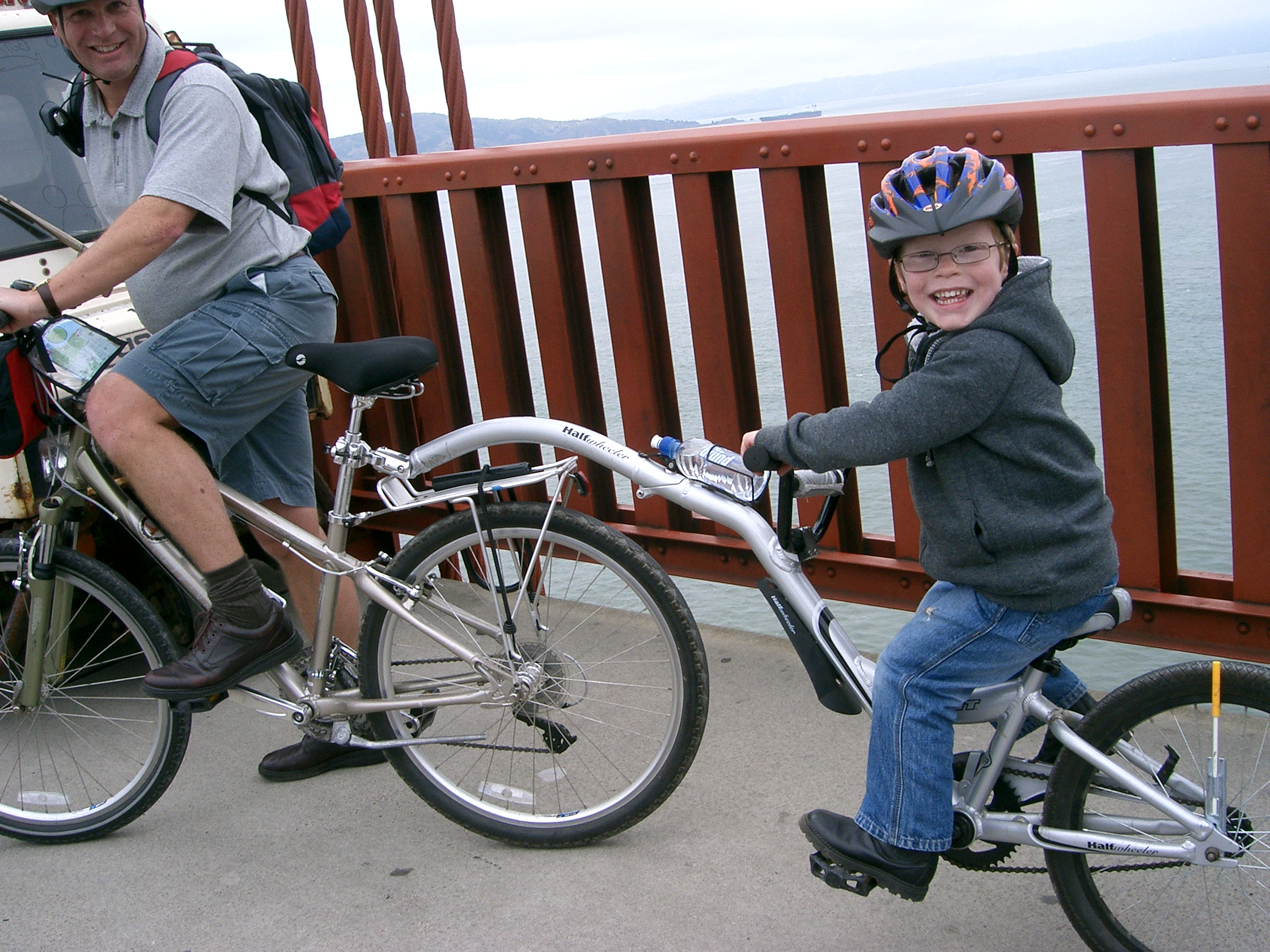
A Half Wheeler trailer bike at the Golden Gate Bridge

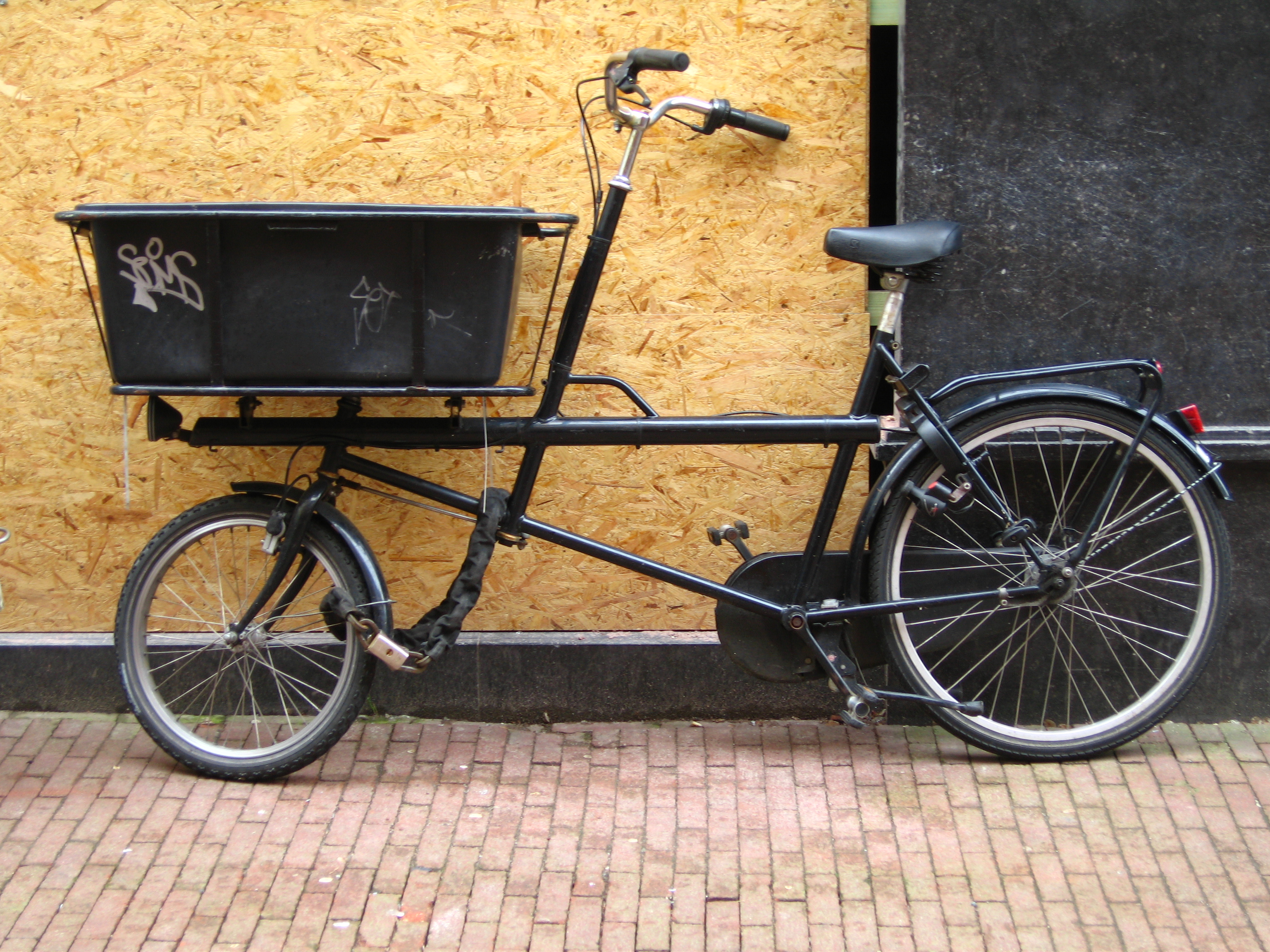
Working bicycle in Amsterdam, Netherlands

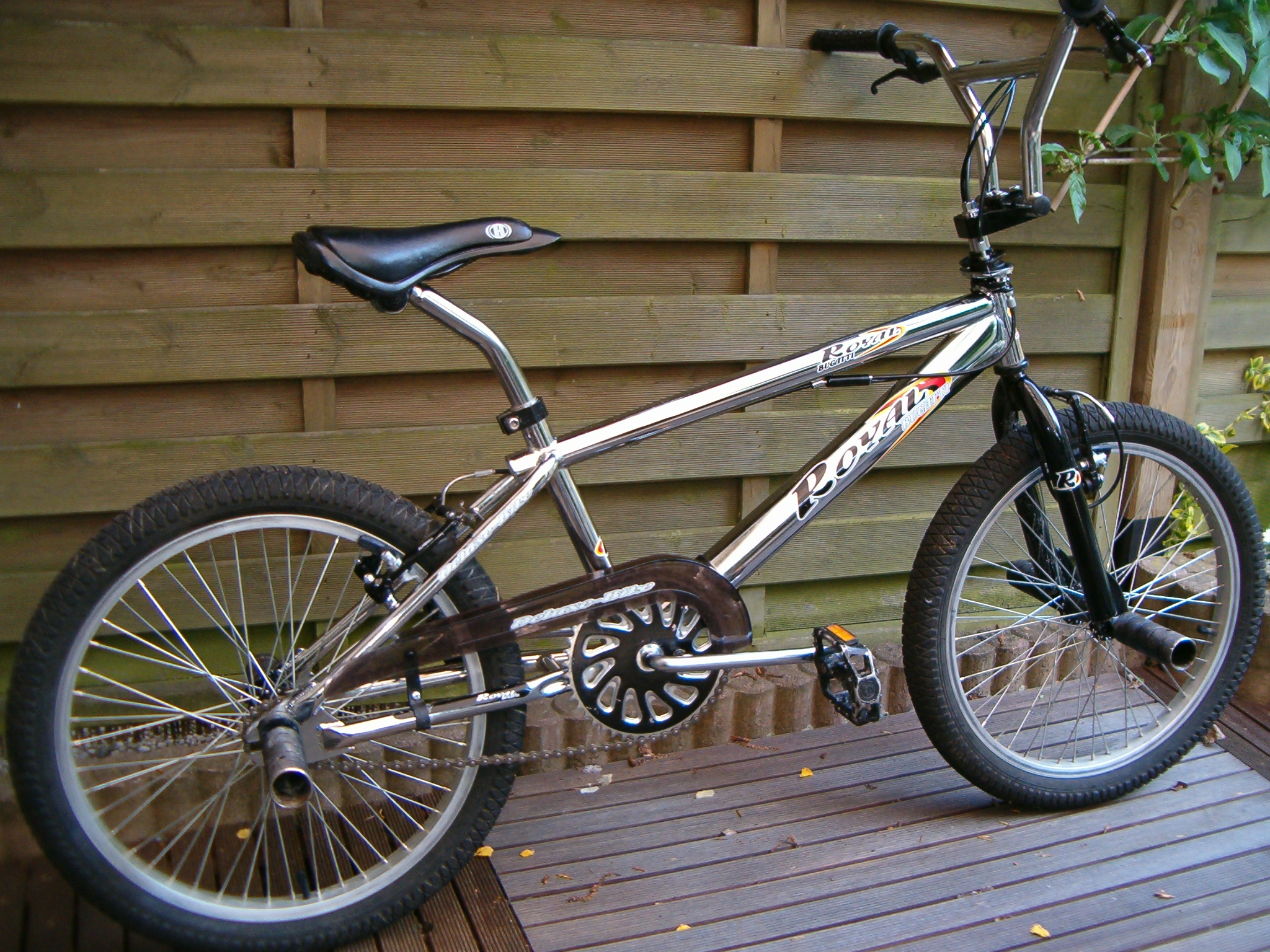
A BMX bike, an example of a bicycle designed for sport

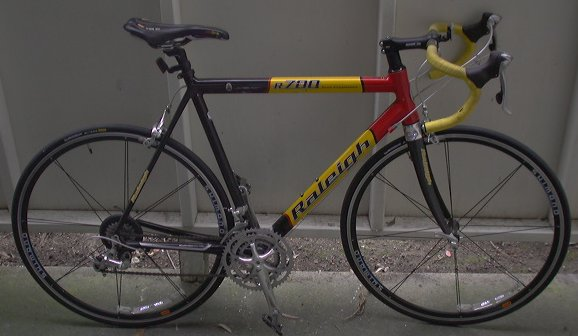
A racing upright bicycle

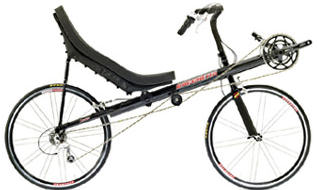
A recumbent bicycle

Diagram of a bicycle

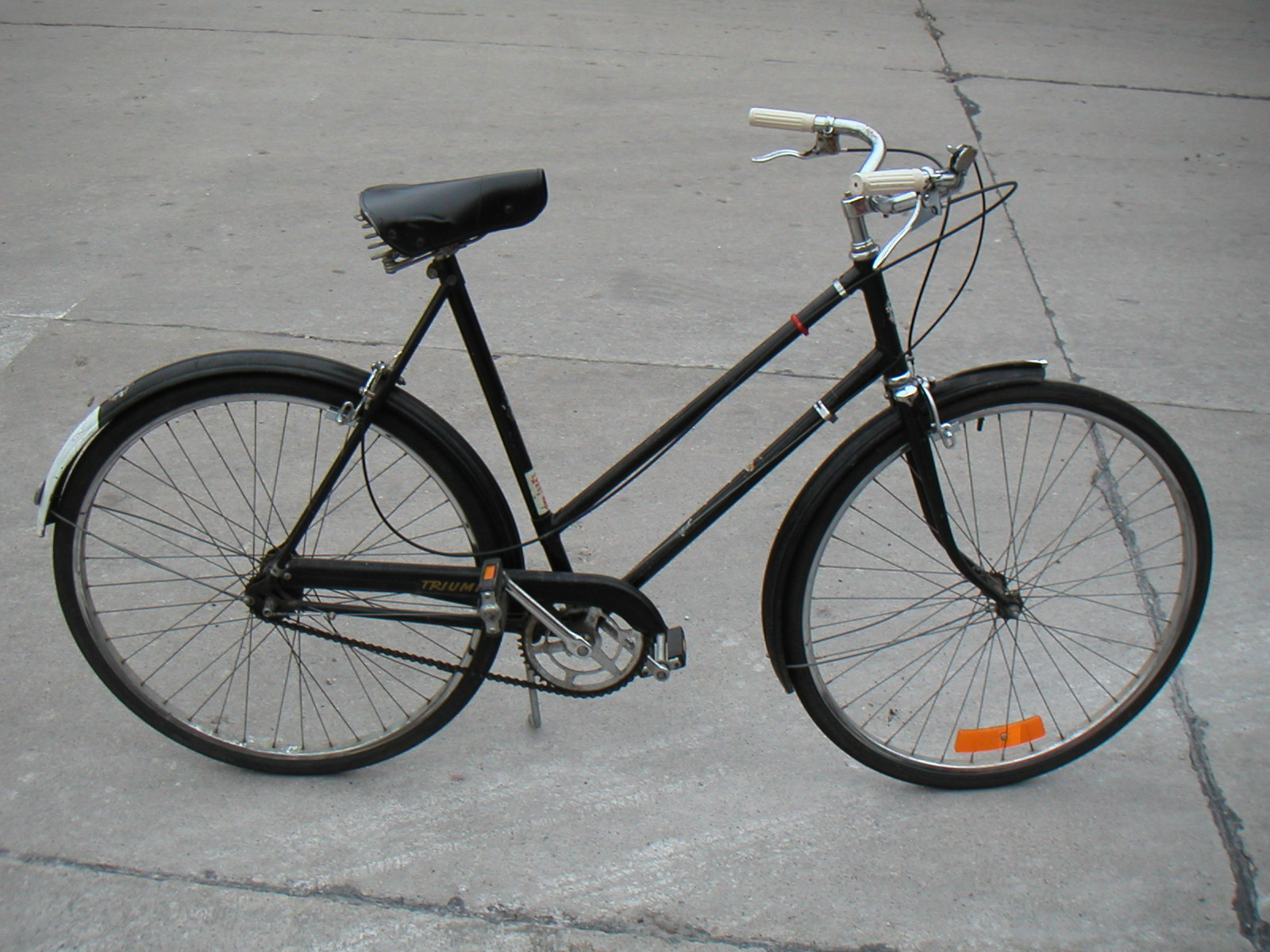
A Triumph with a step-through frame

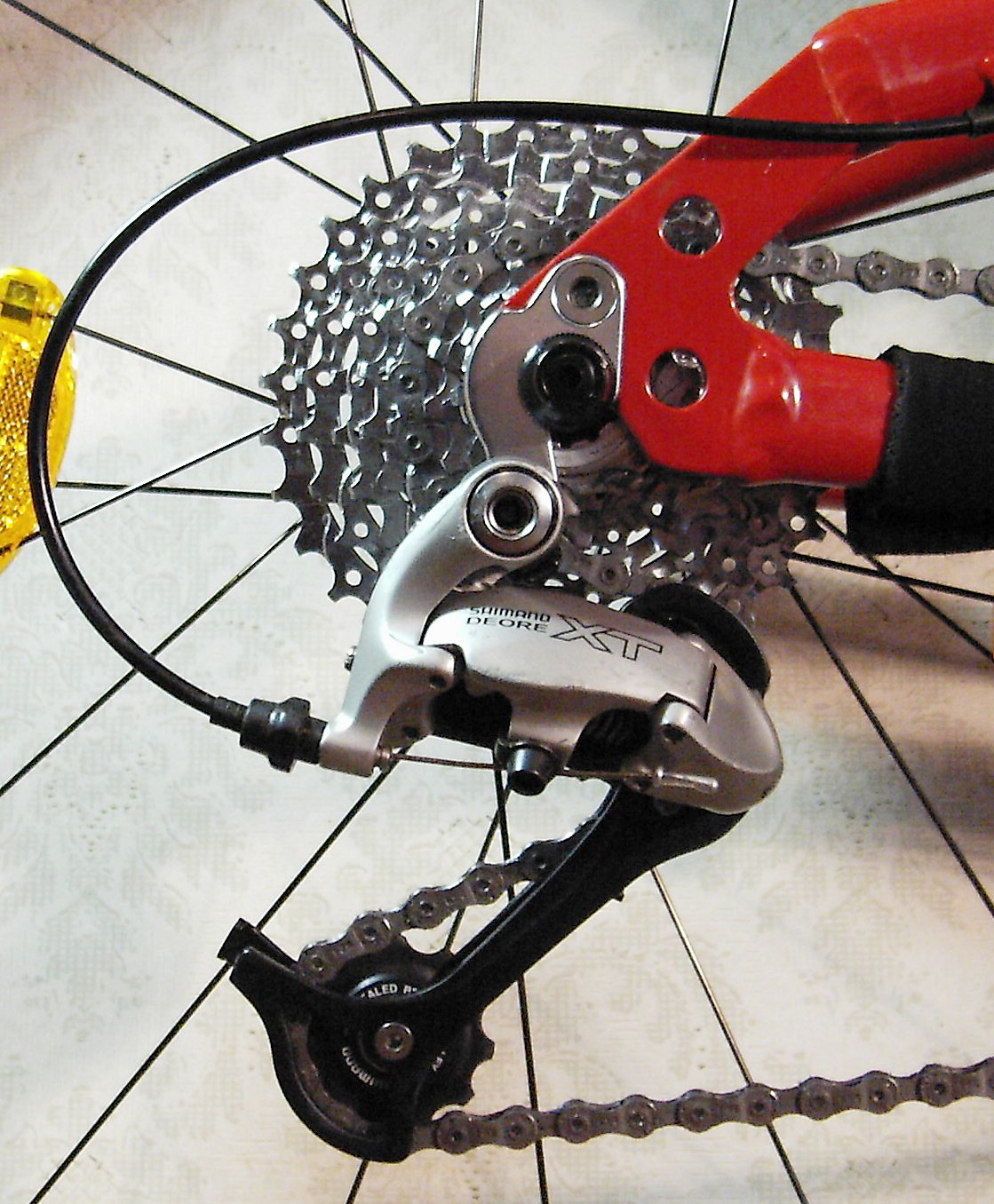
A set of rear sprockets (also known as a cassette) and a derailleur

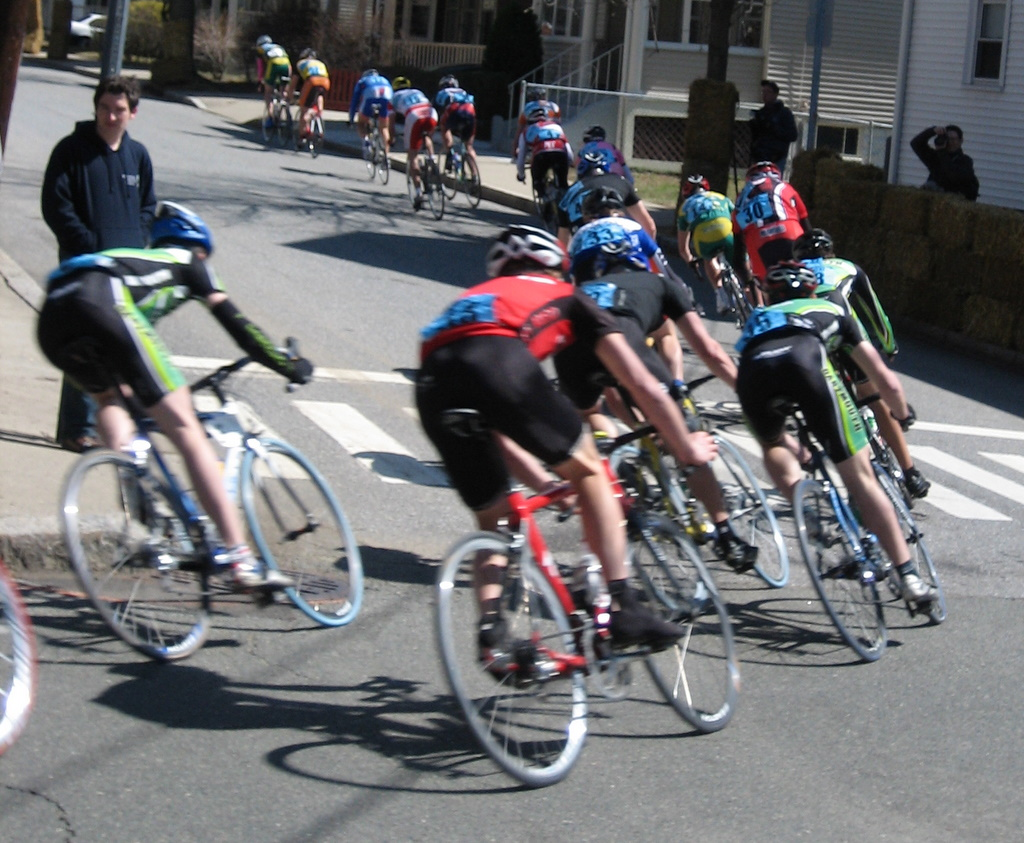
Bicycles leaning in a turn

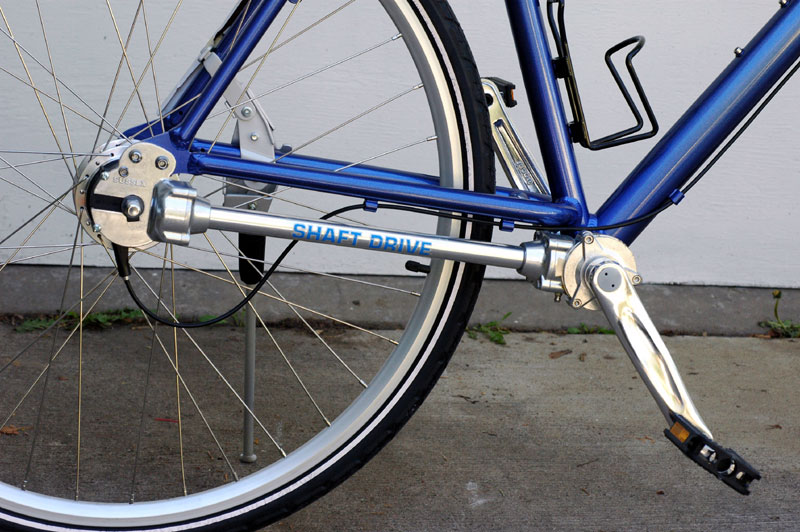
A bicycle with shaft drive instead of a chain

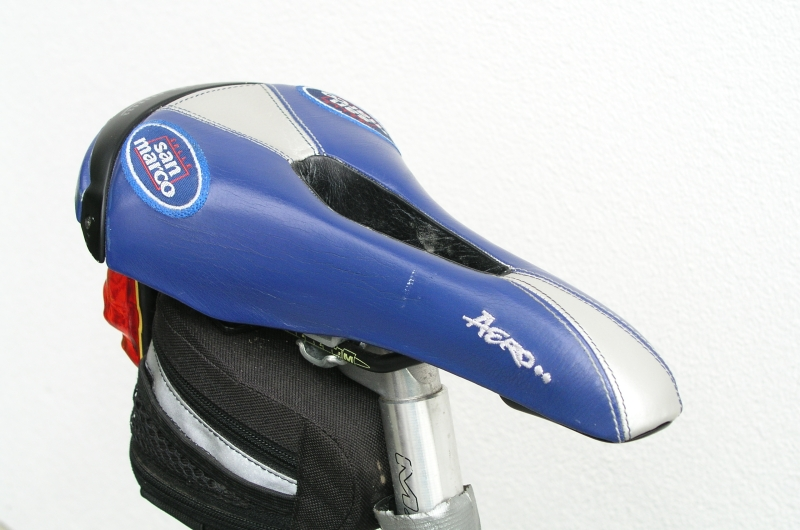
A Selle San Marco saddle designed for women

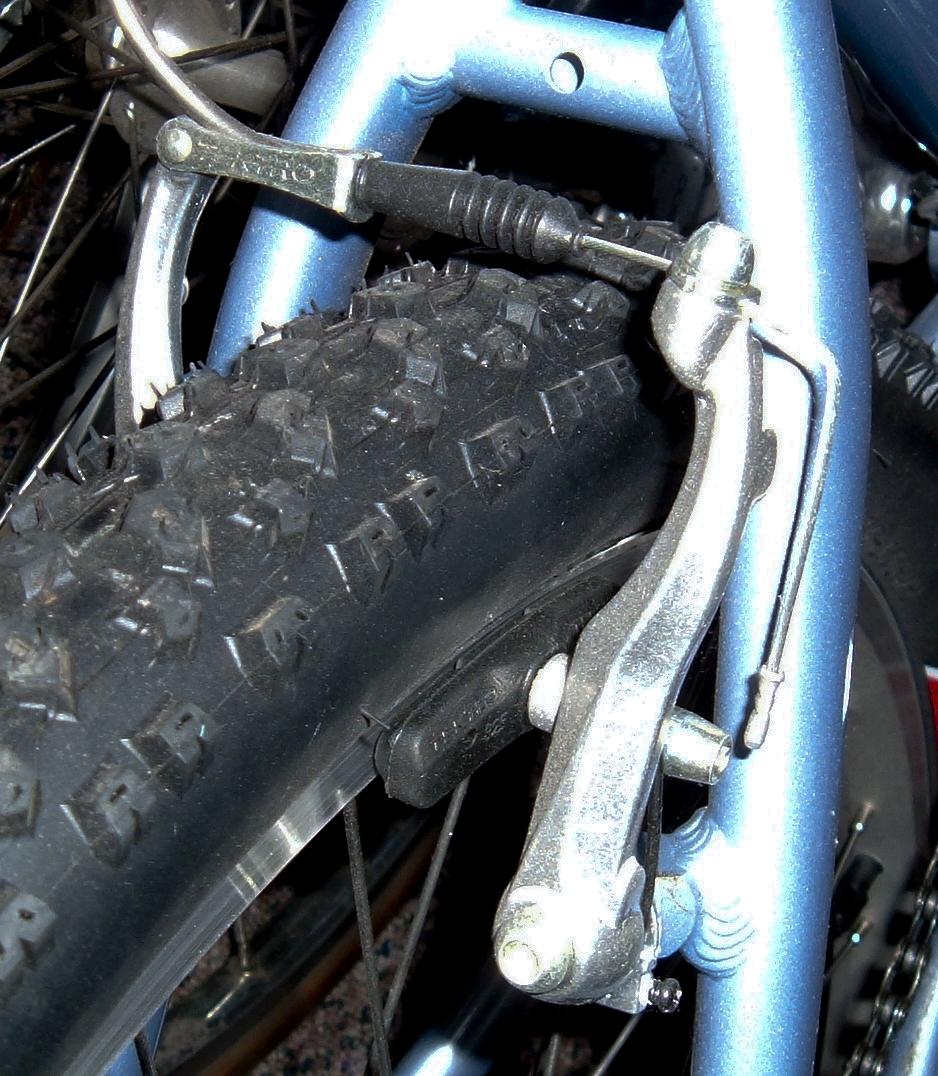
Linear-pull brake, also known by the Shimano trademark: V-Brake, on rear wheel of a mountain bike

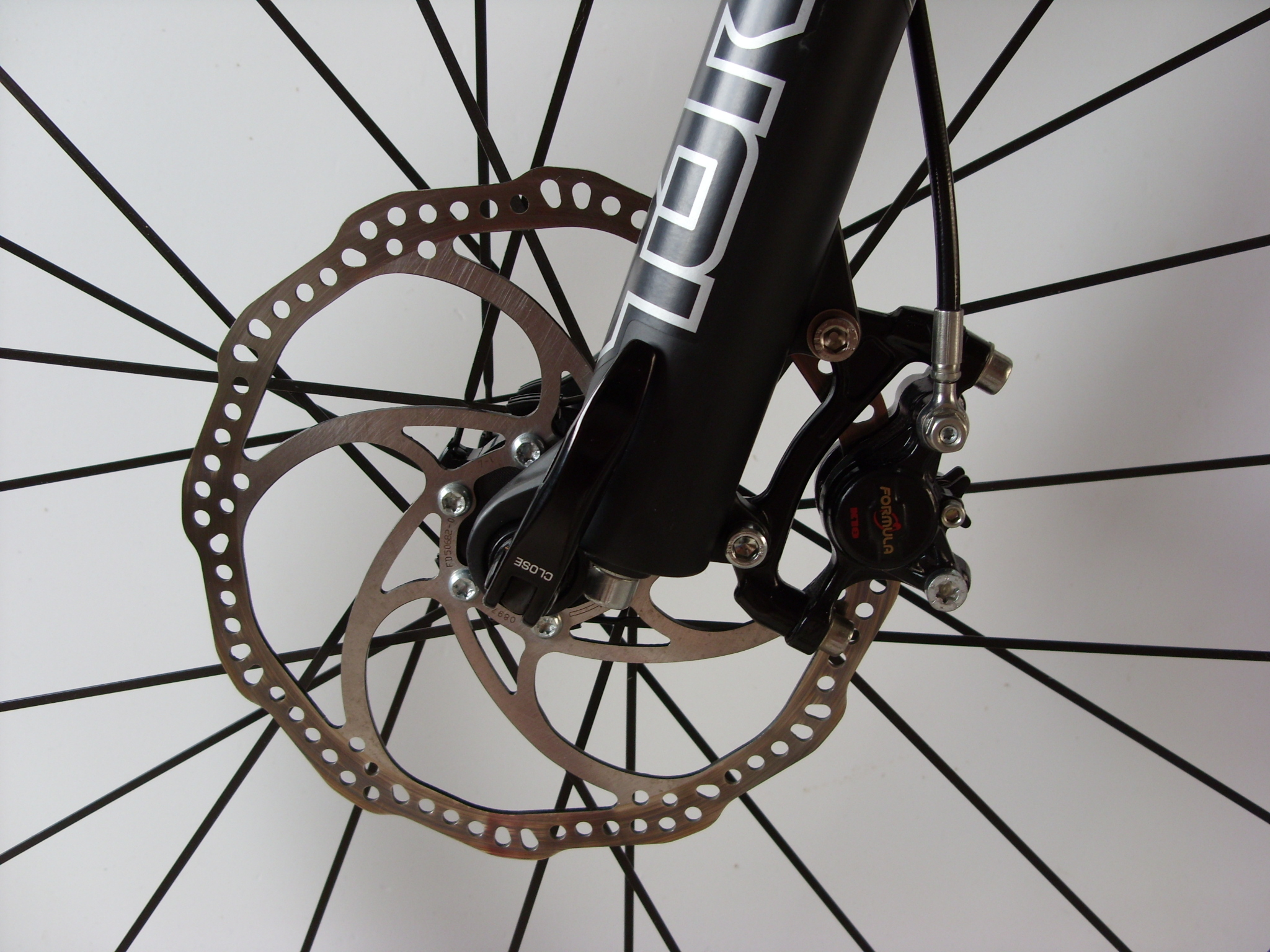
A front disc brake, mounted to the fork and hub

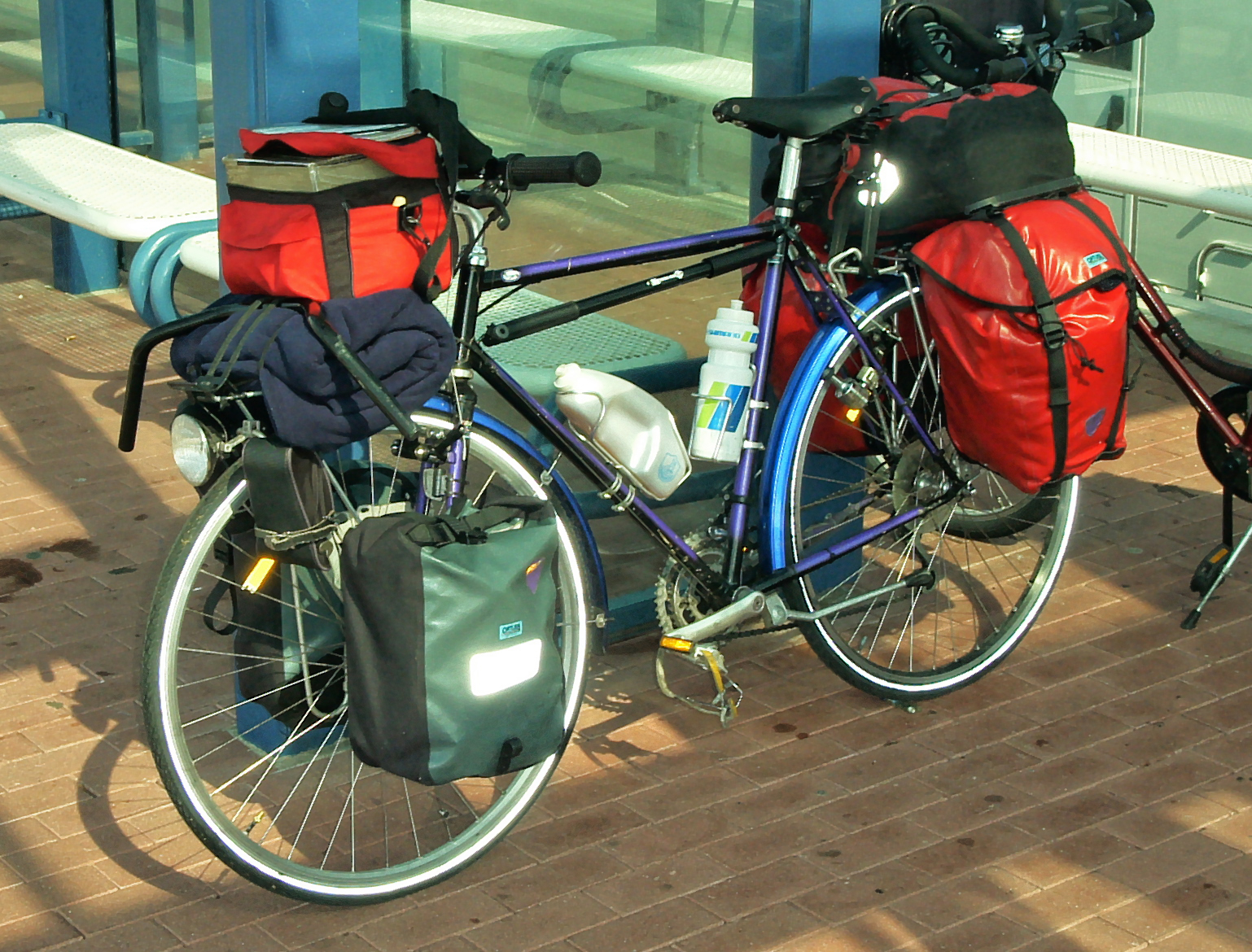
Touring bicycle equipped with head lamp, pump, rear rack, fenders/mud-guards, water bottles and cages, and numerous pannier bags

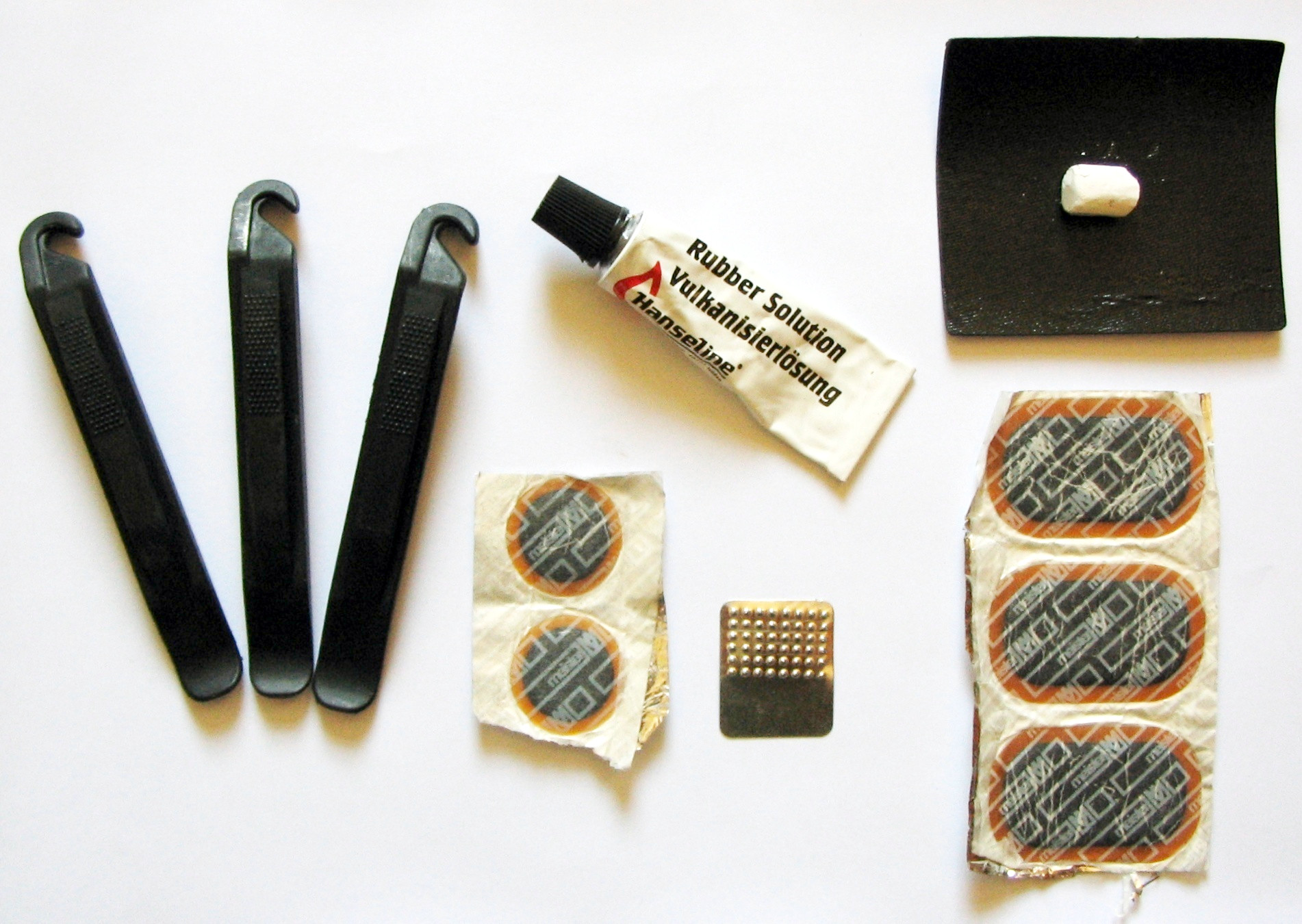
Puncture repair kit with tire levers, sandpaper to clean off an area of the inner tube around the puncture, a tube of rubber solution (vulcanizing fluid), round and oval patches, a metal grater and piece of chalk to make chalk powder (to dust over excess rubber solution). Kits often also include a wax crayon to mark the puncture location.

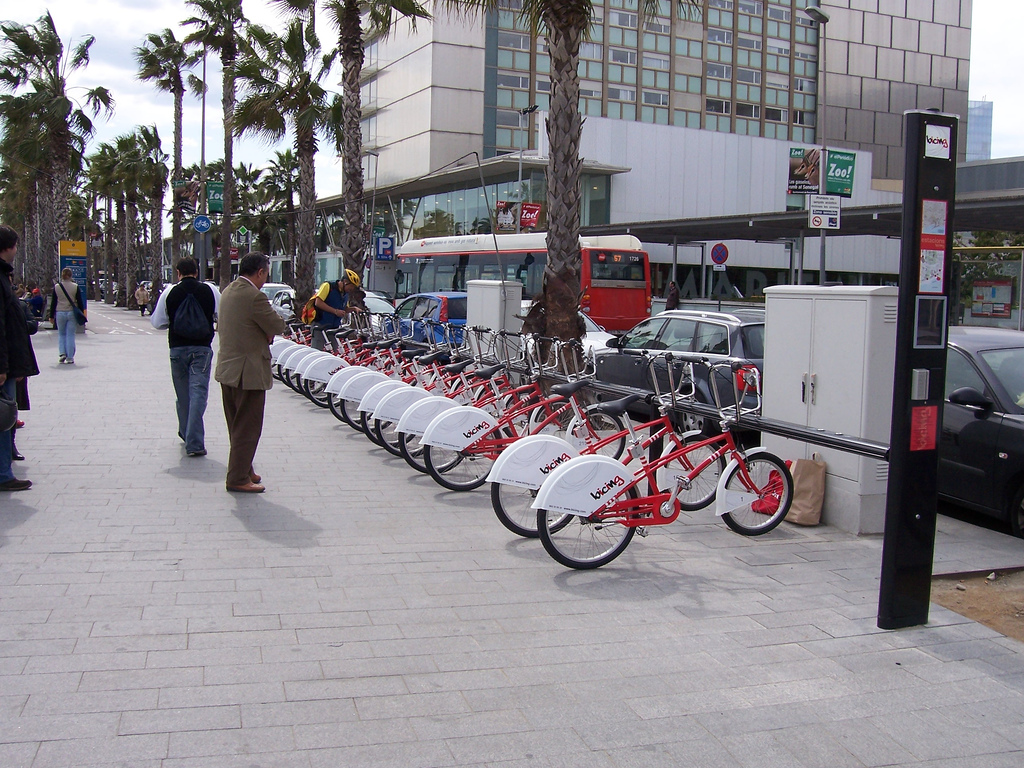
A bike-sharing station in Barcelona

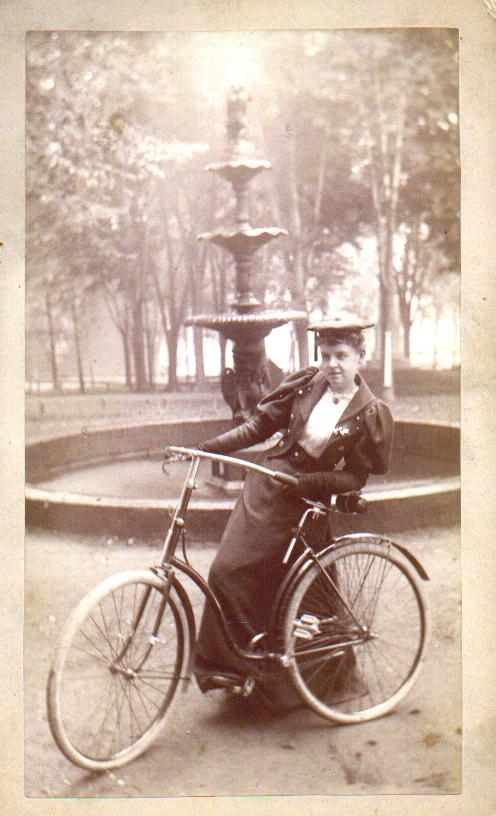
Woman with bicycle, 1890s

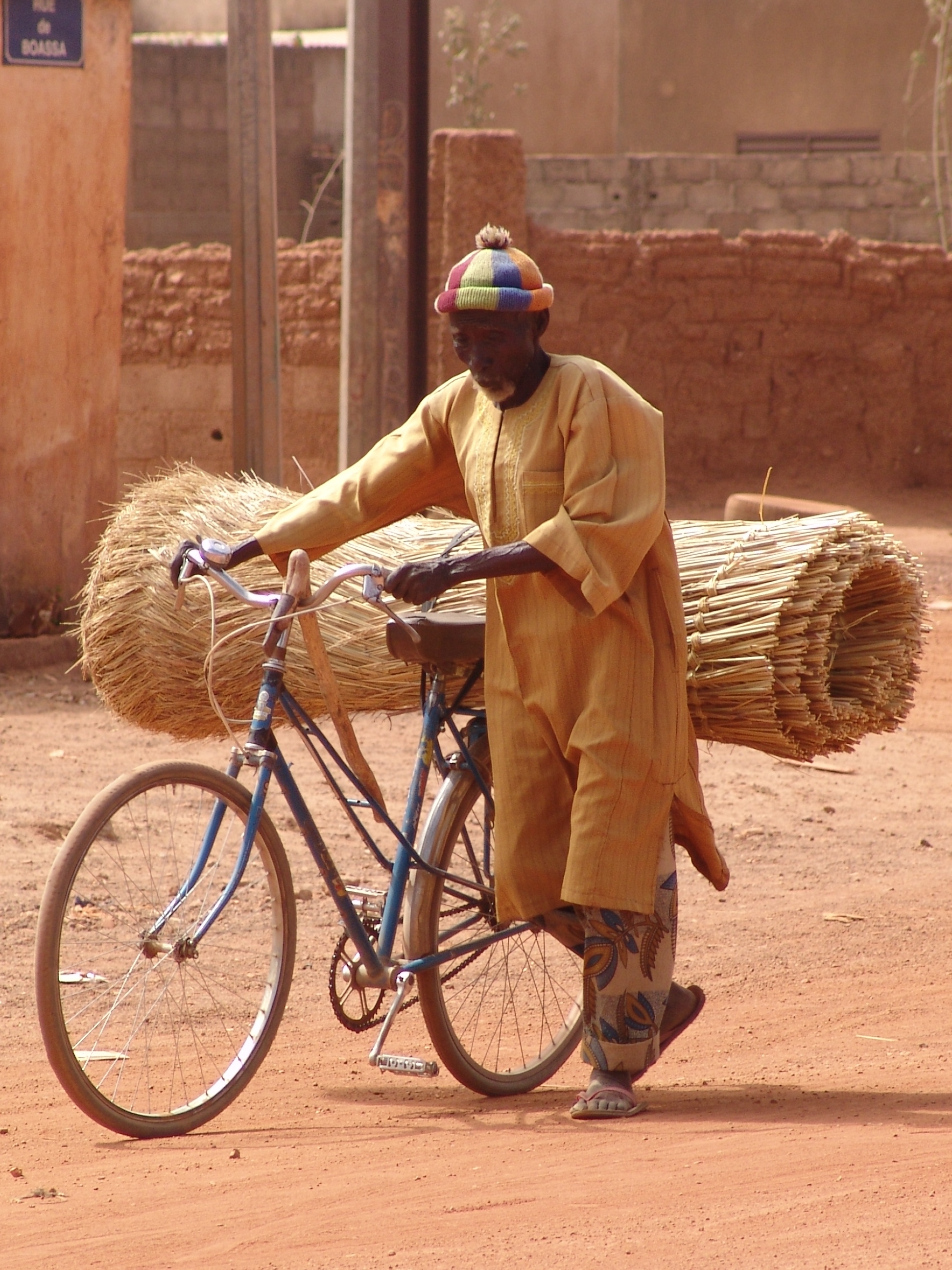
A man uses a bicycle to carry goods in Ouagadougou, Burkina Faso

The following outline is provided as an overview of and topical guide to bicycles:

Bicycle – pedal-driven, human-powered, single-track vehicle, having two wheels attached to a frame, one behind the other. A person who rides a bicycle is called a cyclist or a bicyclist, and the activity is called cycling. Also known as a bike, push bike or cycle.

== What type of thing is a bicycle? ==
Bicycles can be described as all of the following:

- a component of transport
  - a component of a mode of transport
    - a component of road transport
      - a type of vehicle
    - Human-powered transport

== Types of bicycles ==
- 29er hybrid bike
- Art bike
  - Clown bicycle
  - Dekochari
  - Tall bike
- Autobike
- Balance bicycle
- Bamboo bicycle
- Beach cruiser
- Belt-driven bicycle
- Bicycle trailer
- Big Wheel (tricycle)
- Billboard bicycle
- BMX bike
- Boda-boda
- Cardboard bicycle
- Cargo bike
- Chainless bicycle
- Chopper bicycle
  - Raleigh Chopper
- Chukudu
- City bike
- Clown bicycle
- Conference Bike
- Cruiser bicycle
- Cycle rickshaw
- Cyclo-cross bicycle
- Dekochari
- Dicycle
- Electric bicycle
- Faired bicycle
- Fatbike
- Flat bar road bike
- Folding bicycle
  - Birdy (bicycle)
- Gearbox bicycle
- Handcycle
- Hybrid bicycle
- Hydrogen bicycle
- Ice cycle
- Infantry bicycle
- Islamic bicycle
- Longtail bicycle
- Lowrider bicycle
- Military bicycle
  - Swedish military bicycle
  - Swiss army bicycle
- Monowheel
- Motorized bicycle
  - Derny
  - VéloSoleX
- Mountain bike
  - Mountain bike with 26 inch wheel
  - 27.5 Mountain bike (27.5 inch wheel)
  - 29er (29 inch wheel)
  - Downhill bike
- Party bike
- Path racer
- Penny-farthing
- Police bicycle
- Portable bicycle
- Porteur bicycle
- Prone bicycle
- Racing bicycle
- Railbike
- Randonneur
- Recumbent bicycle
  - Whike
- Road bicycle
- Roadster bicycle
- Rowing cycle
- Scraper bike
- Shaft-driven bicycle
- Sideways bike
- Single-speed bicycle
  - Fixed-gear bicycle
- Small wheel bicycle
- Stationary bicycle
- Swingbike
- Tall bike
- Tandem bicycle
  - Sociable
- Time trial bicycle
- Touring bicycle
- Track bicycle
- Trailer bike
- Treadle bicycle
- Triathlon bicycle
- Utility bicycle
- Utility cycling
- Velocipede
  - Dandy horse
- Velomobile
- Wheelie bike
- Wooden bicycle
- Workbike
- Xtracycle

== History of bicycles ==
History of the bicycle

- bicycle craze

=== Key developments ===
- Draisine, dandy horse, or Laufmaschine
- Boneshaker
- Velocipede
- Penny-farthing, high wheel, high wheeler, or ordinary
- Safety bicycle

=== People ===
==== Early developers ====
- Karl von Drais
- Thomas Humber
- Pierre Lallement
- Thomas McCall
- John McCammon
- Eugène Meyer
- Pierre Michaux
- Mikael Pedersen
- Albert Augustus Pope
- John Kemp Starley

==== Other developers ====
- Al Fritz

==== Mountain bike developers ====
- Gary Fisher
- Charlie Kelly
- Joe Breeze
- Keith Bontrager

==== Other notable cyclists ====
- Lenz, Frank
- Murphy, Charles Minthorn, also known as Mile-a-Minute Murphy
- Taylor, Marshall Walter, also known as Major Taylor

==== Racing authors ====
- Eddie Borysewicz
- Greg LeMond
- Joe Parkin
- Davis Phinney
- Bob Roll
- Connie Carpenter
- Lance Armstrong

==== Other authors ====
- Brown, Sheldon (bicycle mechanic)
- Forester, John ("the father of Vehicular Cycling")
- Byrne, David (musician and artist)
- Herlihy, David V. (historian)

=== Organizations ===
- Adventure Cycling Association
- Cycling club
- American Bicycling Education Association
- International Mountain Bicycling Association
- League of American Bicyclists
- Mountain Bike Hall of Fame
- National Off-Road Bicycle Association
- Union Cycliste Internationale
- USA Cycling
- World Human Powered Vehicle Association

== Technical aspects ==
The bicycle has undergone continual adaptation and improvement since its inception. These innovations have continued with the advent of modern materials and computer-aided design, allowing for a proliferation of specialized bicycle types.

=== Uses ===
Bicycles have been and are employed for many uses:

- Cycling – use of bicycles for transport, recreation, or for sport.
  - Transport: bicycle-sharing system
  - Utility: bicycle commuting and utility cycling
  - Work: mail delivery, paramedics, police, couriering, and general delivery.
  - Recreation: bicycle touring, mountain biking, BMX and physical fitness.
  - Racing: track racing, criterium, roller racing and time trial to multi-stage events like the Tour of California, Giro d'Italia, the Tour de France, the Vuelta a España, the Volta a Portugal, among others.
  - Military: scouting, troop movement, supply of provisions, and patrol. See bicycle infantry.
- Show: entertainment and performance, e.g. circus clowns. Used as instrument by Frank Zappa.

=== Types of bicycles ===
List of bicycle types Bicycles can be categorized in different ways: e.g. by function, by number of riders, by general construction, by gearing or by means of propulsion. The more common types include utility bicycles, mountain bicycles, racing bicycles, touring bicycles, hybrid bicycles, cruiser bicycles, and BMX Bikes. Less common are tandems, lowriders, tall bikes, fixed gear, folding models and recumbents (one of which was used to set the IHPVA Hour record).

Unicycles, tricycles and quadracycles are not strictly bicycles, as they have respectively one, three and four wheels, but are often referred to informally as "bikes".

=== Dynamics ===
Bicycle and motorcycle dynamics

- Countersteering
- Stoppie
- Two-mass-skate bicycle
- Wheelie

=== Performance ===
Bicycle performance

- Cadence
- Cycling records
- Hour record

=== Geometry ===
Bicycle and motorcycle geometry

- Q factor (bicycles)

=== Construction and parts ===
In its early years, bicycle construction drew on pre-existing technologies. More recently, bicycle technology has in turn contributed ideas in both old and new areas.

For details on specific bicycle parts, see list of bicycle parts and category:bicycle parts.

==== Frame ====
Bicycle frame - The great majority of today's bicycles have a frame with upright seating which looks much like the first chain-driven bike.

By design:

- folding bicycle
- portable bicycle
- recumbent bicycle
- step-through frame

- mixte
- open frame

- sociable
- tandem bicycle

By frame material:

- bamboo bicycle
- cardboard bicycle
- plastic bicycle
- wooden bicycle

Brands and makers of unusual frames:

- Humber cycles
- Pedersen bicycle
- Zipp 2001

==== Suspension ====
- Bicycle suspension

==== Drivetrain and gearing ====
- Bicycle drivetrain systems
- Bicycle gearing

===== Power collection =====
- bottom bracket
- cranks
- pedals
- treadle

===== Power transmission =====
- chain
- chainline
- shaft drive
- belt-driven bicycle

===== Power modification =====
- bicycle gearing
  - gear inches
- derailleur gears
- electronic gear-shifting system
- gearbox bicycle
- hub gear
- shifter
- single-speed bicycle

===== Power application =====
- cassette
- freewheel

==== Steering and seating ====
- handlebars
- fork
  - fork tube
- stem
- headset
- recumbent steering
- Bicycle saddle
- Bicycle seat

==== Brakes ====
- Bicycle brake

==== Wheels and tires ====
- Bicycle wheel
  - wheelset
- Bicycle tire
  - slick tire
  - knobby tire
  - tubular tire
  - tubes
  - Valve stem

==== Tracks ====
Some bicycles are built for specific tracks:

- Hotchkiss Bicycle Railroad
- Shweeb

Or special tracks are built specifically for bicycles:

- Trampe bicycle lift

(Also see Cycling infrastructure)

==== Bicycle accessories ====
Bicycle accessories

- Bicycle basket
- Bicycle bell
- Bicycle helmet
- Bicycle lighting and bicycle reflector
- Bicycle pump and CO_{2} inflator
- Bicycle rollers
- Bicycle tools
- Bicycle trailer
- Bicycle trainer
- Bike lock
- Bottle cages and water bottles
- Chainguard
- Child seats
- Clipless pedals
- Cycling power meter
- Cyclocomputer and cycling power meter
- Kick stand
- Luggage carrier
- Mudguard or fender
- Panniers
- Saddlebag
- Sidecar
- Tire lever
- Toe-clips and toestraps
- Training wheels

==== Bicycle tools ====
Bicycle tools

- Bicycle pump
- Chain tool
- Chain whip
- Cone wrench
- Hex key
- Peanut butter wrench
- Spoke wrench
- Tire lever
- Wheel truing stand

==== Standards ====
A number of formal and industry standards exist for bicycle components to help make spare parts exchangeable and to maintain a minimum product safety.

The International Organization for Standardization, ISO, has a special technical committee for cycles, TC149, that has the following scope: "Standardization in the field of cycles, their components and accessories with particular reference to terminology, testing methods and requirements for performance and safety, and interchangeability."

CEN, European Committee for Standardization, also has a specific Technical Committee, TC333, that defines European standards for cycles. Their mandate states that EN cycle standards shall harmonize with ISO standards. Some CEN cycle standards were developed before ISO published their standards, leading to strong European influences in this area. European cycle standards tend to describe minimum safety requirements, while ISO standards have historically harmonized parts geometry. The TC149 ISO bicycle committee, including the TC149/SC1 ("Cycles and major sub-assemblies") subcommittee, has published the following standards:

- ISO 4210 Cycles—Safety requirements for bicycles
- ISO 6692 Cycles—Marking of cycle components
- ISO 6695 Cycles—Pedal axle and crank assembly with square end fitting—Assembly dimensions
- ISO 6696 Cycles—Screw threads used in bottom bracket assemblies
- ISO 6697 Cycles—Hubs and freewheels—Assembly dimensions
- ISO 6698 Cycles—Screw threads used to assemble freewheels on bicycle hubs
- ISO 6699 Cycles—Stem and handlebar bend—Assembly dimensions
- ISO 6701 Cycles—External dimensions of spoke nipples
- ISO 6742 Cycles—Lighting and retro-reflective devices—Photometric and physical requirements
- ISO 8090 Cycles—Terminology (same as BS 6102–4)
- ISO 8098 Cycles—Safety requirements for bicycles for young children
- ISO 8488 Cycles—Screw threads used to assemble head fittings on bicycle forks
- ISO 8562 Cycles—Stem wedge angle
- ISO 10230 Cycles—Splined hub and sprocket—Mating dimensions
- ISO 11243 Cycles—Luggage carriers for bicycles—Concepts, classification and testing

Other ISO Technical Committees have published various cycle relevant standards, for example:

- ISO 5775 Bicycle tire and rim designations
- ISO 9633 Cycle chains—Characteristics and test methods

Published cycle standards from CEN TC333 include:

- EN 14764 City and trekking bicycles – Safety requirements and test methods
- EN 14765 Bicycles for young children – Safety requirements and test methods
- EN 14766 Mountain-bicycles – Safety requirements and test methods
- EN 14781 Racing bicycles – Safety requirements and test methods
- EN 14872 Bicycles – Accessories for bicycles – Luggage carriers
- EN 15496 Cycles – Requirements and test methods for cycle locks

Yet to be approved cycle standards from CEN TC333:

- EN 15194 Cycles—Electrically power assisted cycles (EPAC bicycle)
- EN 15532 Cycles—Terminology
- 00333011 Cycles – Bicycles trailers – safety requirements and test methods

== Social and historical aspects ==
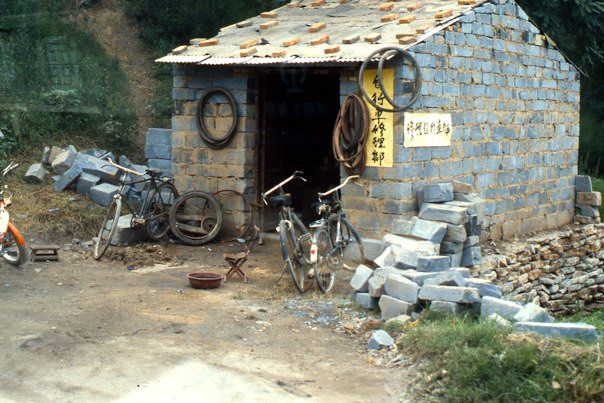
Bicycle repair facility in China, 1987

The bicycle has had a considerable effect on human society, in both the cultural and industrial realms.

- List of films about bicycles and cycling

=== Economic implications ===
- Bicycle industry
- World Bicycle Relief
- Mass production
- Planned obsolescence
- List of bicycle manufacturing companies

=== In daily life ===
- Bicycle commuting
- Community bicycle programs
- Trampe bicycle lift

=== In poverty reduction ===
Bicycle poverty reduction

- Baisikeli Ugunduzi
- Bikes Not Bombs
- Bikes to Rwanda
- BikeTown Africa
- Pedaling to Freedom
- With My Own Two Wheels
- World Bicycle Relief
- Working Bikes

=== Legal requirements ===
The Vienna Convention on Road Traffic of the United Nations considers a bicycle to be a vehicle, and a person controlling a bicycle (whether actually riding or not) is considered an operator.

- Bicycle law

== See also ==
General

- Bicycle locker
- Bicycle parking station
- Bicycle tree
- Cycling
- Danish bicycle VIN-system
- Glossary of cycling
- History of cycling
- List of bicycle and human powered vehicle museums
- List of bicycle brands and manufacturing companies
- Mountain bike
- Mountain biking

Related vehicle types

- Quadracycle
- Tricycle
- Unicycle
- Self-balancing unicycle
- Motorcycle

Other

- Outline of motorcycles and motorcycling
- Safety standards
- Transportation technology, timeline of
