= SplinterBike =

Wooden bicycle

The SplinterBike is an invention by Michael Thompson. It is a 100% wooden bicycle which only uses glue to hold everything together. No bolts or screws were used.

== History ==
On September 16, 2010, during the Tour of Britain, Michael Thompson (a veteran wood joiner) suggested to his friend James Tully (an amateur cyclist) that he could make a 100% wooden bicycle. James responded by saying that if Michael would build it, he would ride it.

To consolidate these bold statements the two made a £1 bet.

== 100% Wooden Bicycle Land Speed Record ==
On August 18, 2011 Thompson and Tully set the 100% Wooden Bicycle Land Speed Record with an average speed of 11.3 MPH (18.2 km/h). Because this was the first 100% wooden bicycle, all they needed was a successful run to measure the speed.

Due to the use of a soft running track and mechanical failure, James was not able to drive the bike to higher speeds.

== SplinterBikeHʌɪbrɪd ==
The Hʌɪbrɪd is a derivative of the original SplinterBike. The idea behind the bicycle was to build an everyday bicycle with as much wood as possible. Some elements of a bicycle, like the drive section or brakes, are simply not realistic in wood. However, the entire frame and the rims are made of wood (walnut and birch).

=== Thompson T-Bar Frame ===
The frame uses a T shape for maximum strength, while maintaining the necessary flexibility. Other wooden framed bicycles use a tubular design, making the Hʌɪbrɪd unique.

== See also ==
- Bamboo bicycle
- Cardboard bicycle
- Chukudu wood bicycle
- Wooden bicycle
