= Busch & Müller =

German bicycle accessory manufacturer

Coordinates: 51.109489°N 7.63309°E

- Native name: Busch & Müller
- Company type: KG
- Founded: 1925
- Founders: Willy Müller, August Busch
- Headquarters: Meinerzhagen, Germany
- Key people: Rainer Müller; Guido Müller
- Products: Bicycle parts
- Number of employees: 160
- Website: https://www.bumm.de/en/

Busch & Müller KG is a company based in Meinerzhagen, Germany, that manufactures bicycle accessories, in particular lighting systems, and holds numerous patents as an inventor.

The company is also represented in Australia, Belgium, Denmark, Finland, France, Great Britain, Italy, the Netherlands, Norway, Austria, Poland, Switzerland, Taiwan and the USA with its bicycle and vehicle parts and is ISO 9001 certified.

== History ==
The company was founded on 1 September 1925 by 16-year-old Willy Müller and the master toolmaker August Busch, later a local group leader of the NSDAP, for the purpose of producing cat's eyes, which had become legally required equipment for bicycles.

== Post-war period ==
After World War II, the company provided glass for rear lights to Opel and in return was given an Opel Blitz, which was used for deliveries. Later, from 1957 to 1985, rear-view mirrors were supplied for the Kadett and Rekord models.

Further innovative developments for vehicle lighting, especially for bicycles, are documented by the patents awarded between 1996 and 2007, which the company says have been affected by infringement.

== Products ==
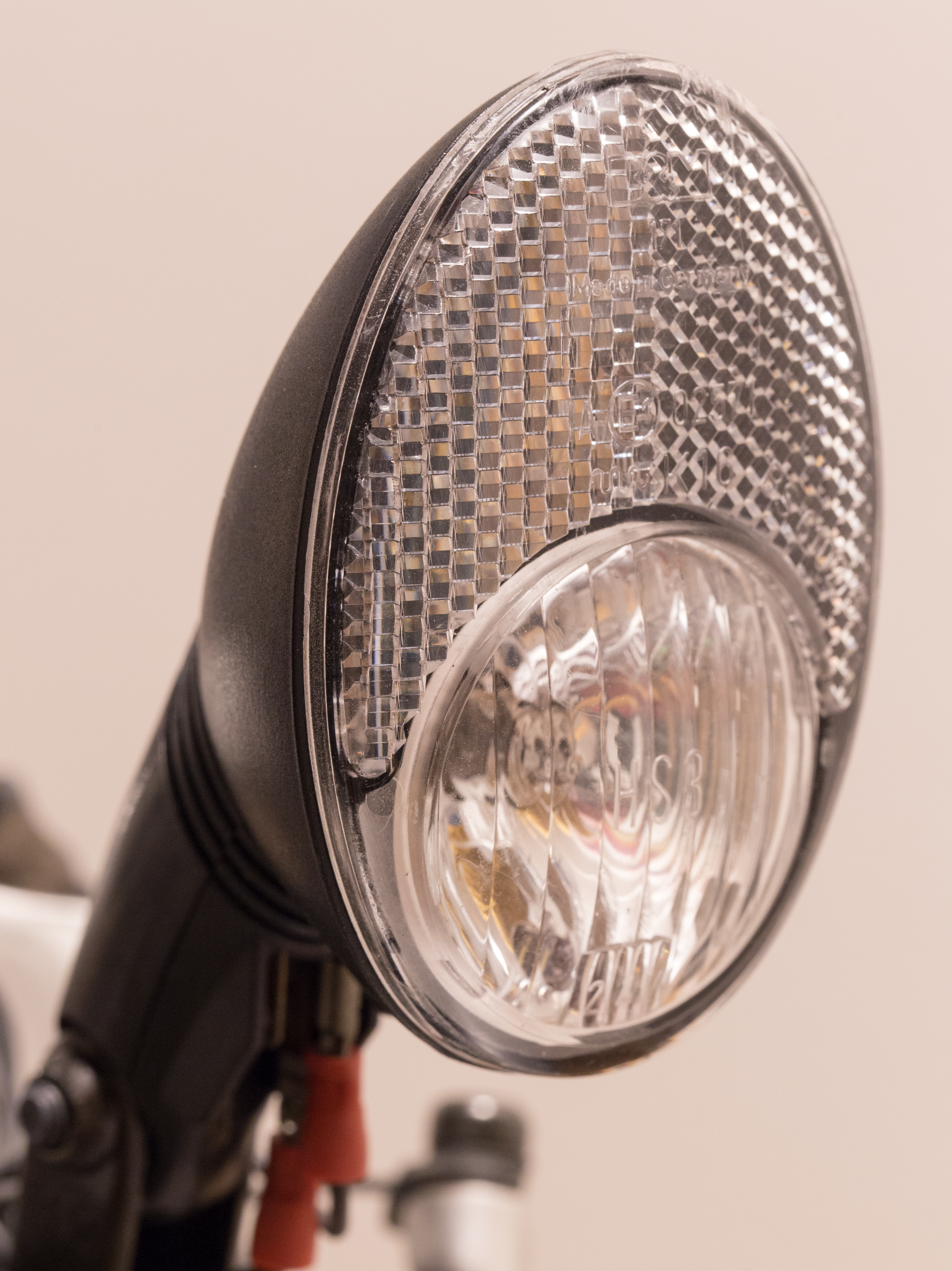
Busch & Müller lumotec bicycle headlight

Busch & Müller is the world market leader in the field of bicycle lighting. Its product range now includes: reflectors, tail lights, bicycle headlights, dynamos, rear-view mirrors, gear case, side support wheels for children's bicycles and other bicycle accessories. In total, Busch & Müller manufactures more than 500 different products for the bicycle industry.

The company's new developments include automatic lights (automatically turned on and off by means of a light-dark sensor) and free-form surface headlamps for bicycles. These are headlamps with a clear lens, whereby the light distribution is taken over by a computer-calculated mirror reflector. For some years now, LED headlamps have also been available for bicycles, which also use free-form reflectors to bundle the light. Their light is wider and brighter than that of conventional bicycle headlamps. The company has also recently developed a rear light for hub dynamos with integrated brake light. In 2007, Busch & Müller developed the first gas discharge headlamp for bicycles that meets the requirements of the German Highway Code.

== Reference company ==
Since at least 2008–2009, Dassault Systèmes has listed Busch & Müller as a reference company in connection with the software it distributes; other companies it lists are Liebherr-Aerospace, Schuler, and Meyer Werft.
