= Bamboo bicycle =

Two-wheeled vehicle with a bamboo frame

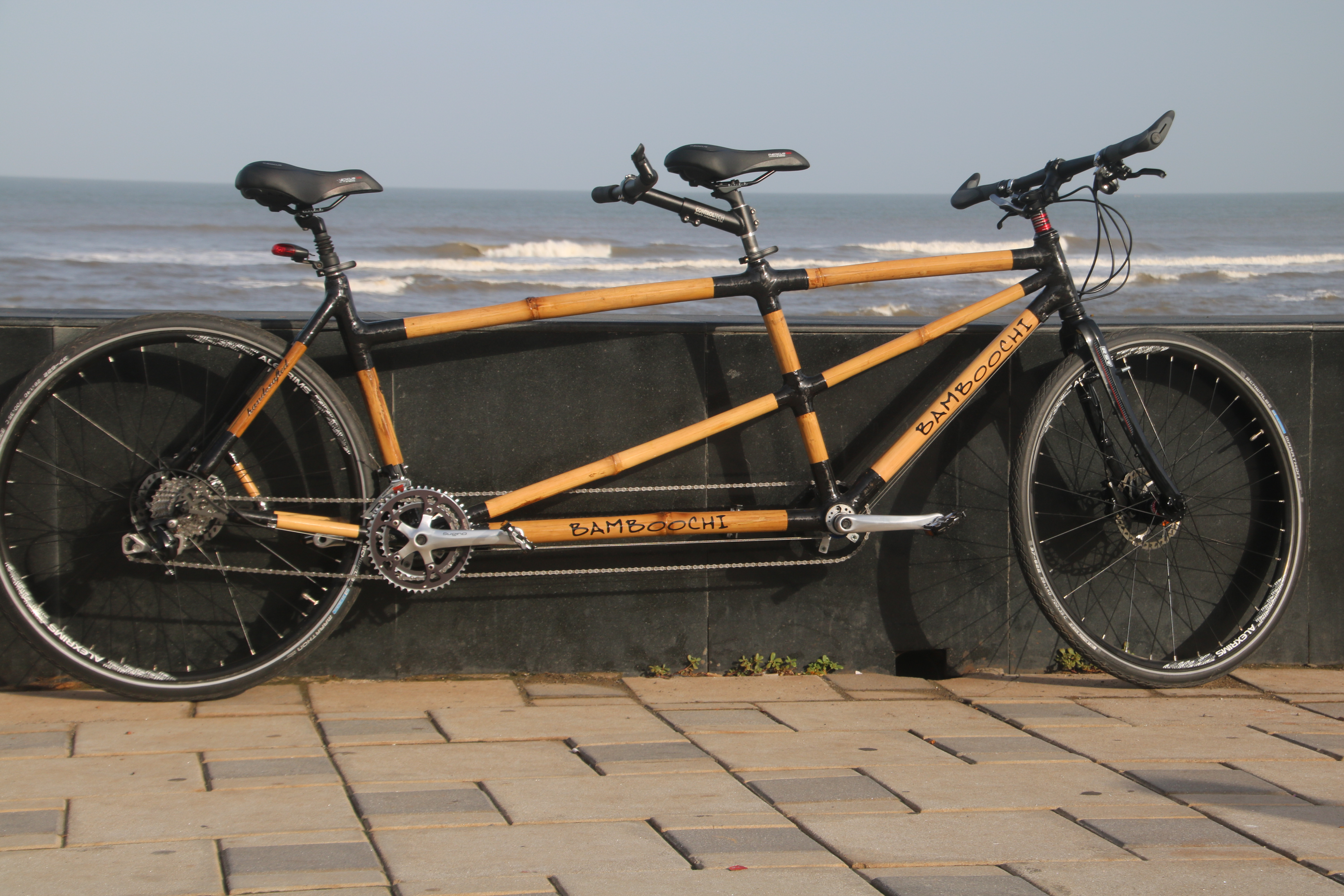
A bamboo tandem bicycle in Mumbai from 2019

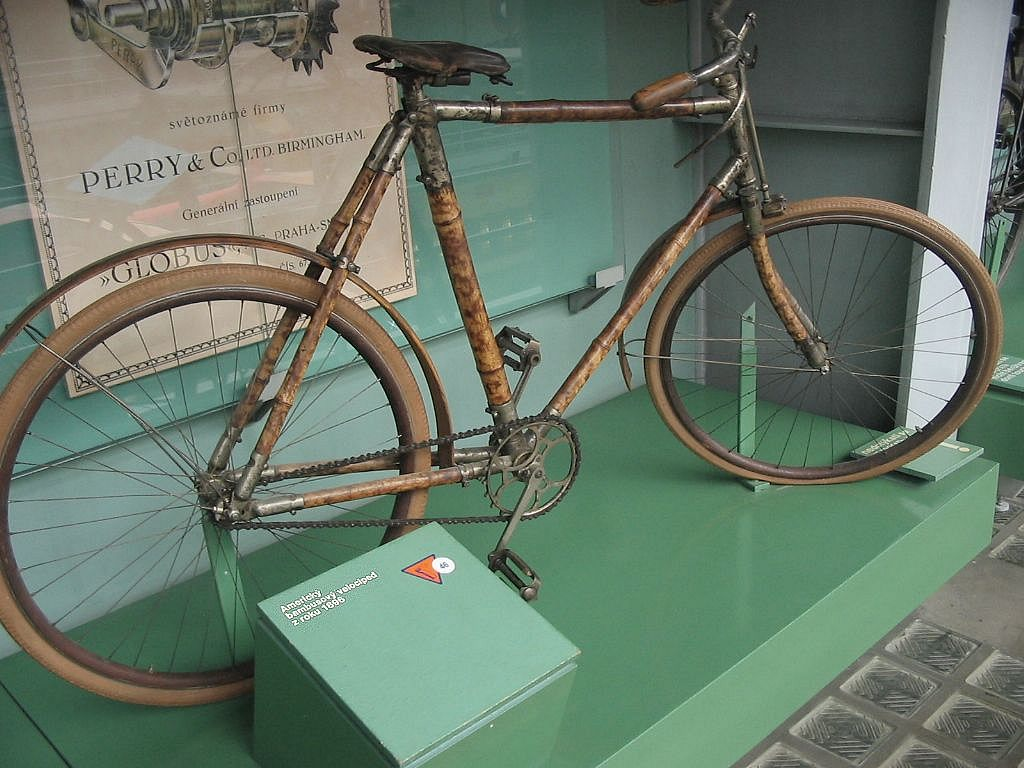
A bamboo bicycle from 1896

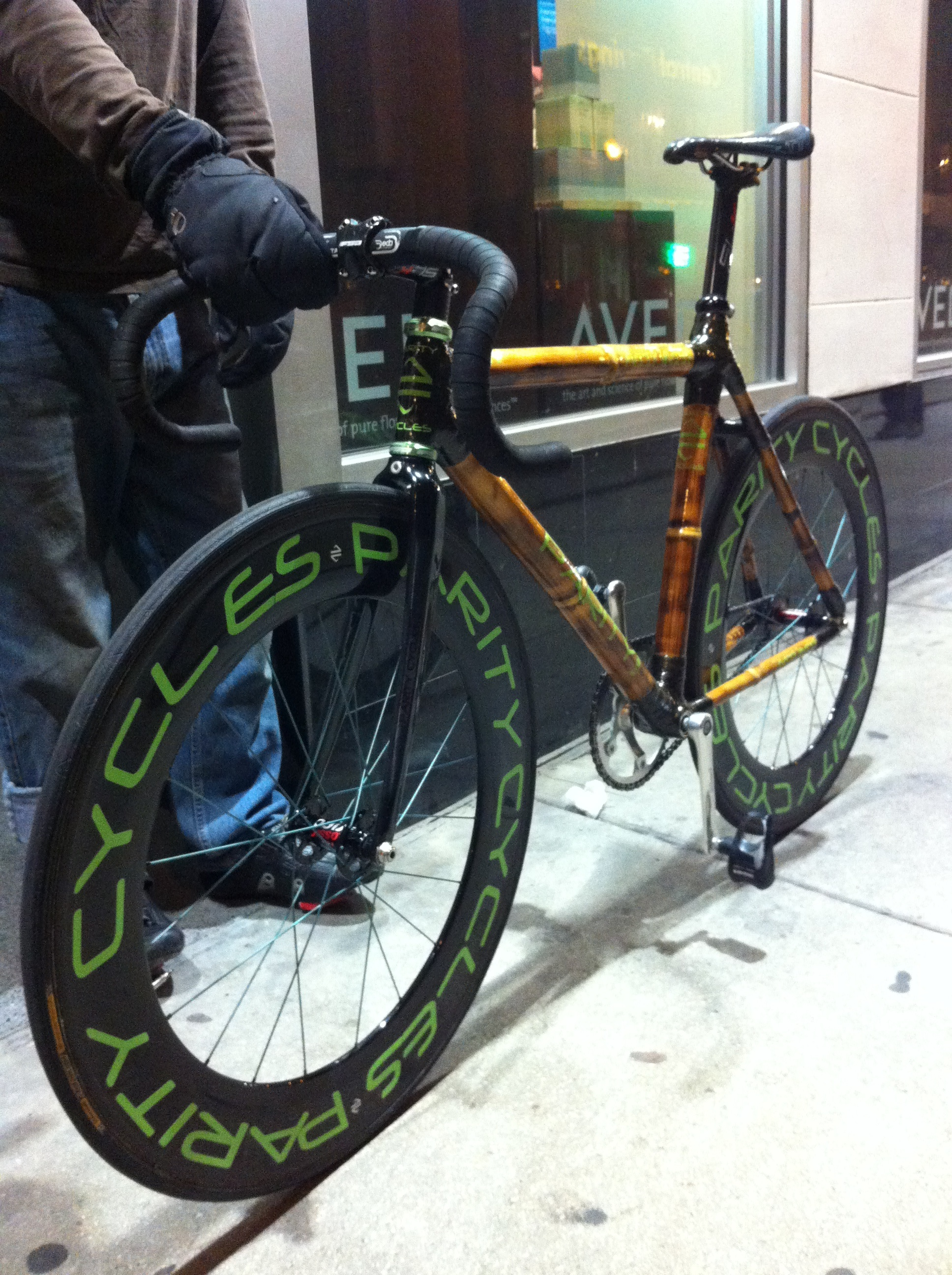
A carbon-fibre jointed bamboo-framed fixed gear bicycle

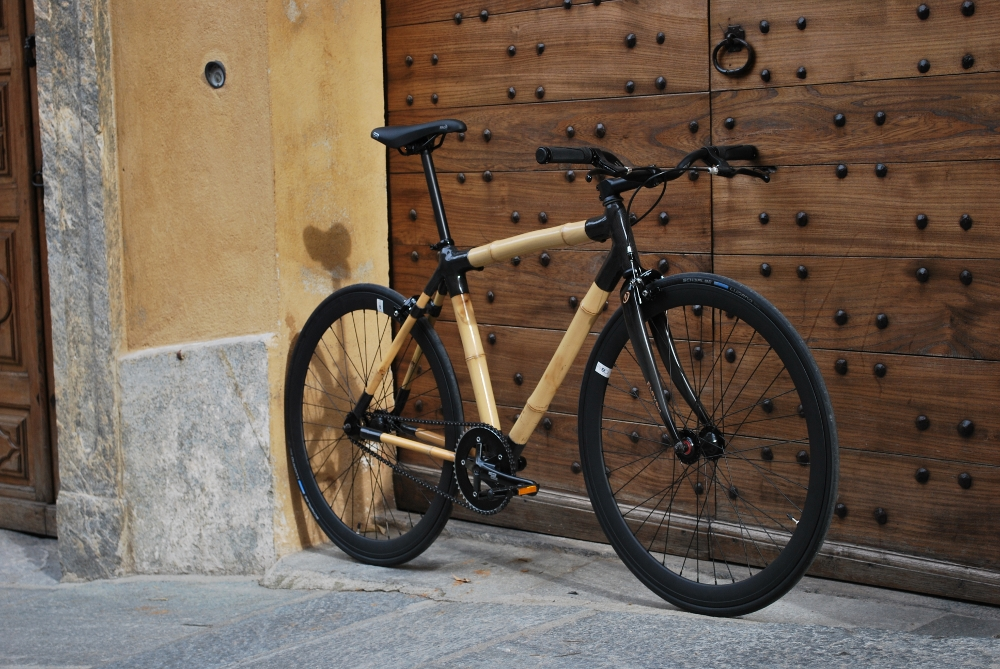
A bamboo bike made in Brazil

Bamboo bicycles are pedal-and-chain-driven, human-powered, single-track vehicles that have two wheels attached to a bamboo frame. Because of its light weight, vibration damping, and sustainability, bamboo is slowly starting to be used in bicycle frame production, though the industry is still dominated by aluminium frames.

== History ==
Bamboo bikes were first patented in England by the Bamboo Cycle Company and introduced to the general public on 26 April 1894. A US patent was applied for in 1895, by August Oberg and Andrew Gustafson, and granted in 1896. However, with the development of tougher industrial metals, such as steel and aluminium, large-scale usage of bamboo to build bicycles never happened.

Though bicycles are a staple of human transportation, in both rural and urban areas, bamboo bicycles are not widely used. With the advent of the Green movement, however, bamboo is being used again, primarily for expensive racing and touring bicycles. Bamboo bikes are entering the market as low cost alternatives to relatively expensive and unsustainable aluminium and metal bikes.

== Technical aspects ==
Several aspects of bamboo are extremely valuable to both cyclists and bicycle manufacturers: high strength-to-weight ratio, vibration control, and sustainable growth. Because of bamboo's tendency to grow straight, it does not exhibit "knots" and "turns" in its wood, unlike other types of wood. As a result, bamboo has a higher specific tensile strength than steel, as well as a higher specific compressive strength than concrete. This tendency also allows for excellent vibration control, which, in turn, provides for a smoother ride and increased stability on rough terrain.

The bamboo poles can be joined in a number of different ways. The earliest models used metal joints which were then tightened around the bamboo. Another approach is to wrap the joints with resin saturated fibers to make composite lugs around the bamboo frame members. For modernised track bicycles, carbon fibre, due to its light weight, is used for the remainder of the parts that are not made of bamboo - for example, the fork, because it is difficult to find a perfect piece of bamboo that fits into the head tube of the frame.

== Projects ==
Bamboo could be used as an alternative to traditional steel and aluminium bikes in many rural areas because of its potential sustainability.

A Bamboo Bike Project started by engineers at Columbia University created a small number of bamboo bikes from 2007 to 2011. This was done with the intention of providing low cost bikes for Africans in rural areas, and stimulating local bike building industries, without major assistance from outside sources.

The United Nations and the United States have invested in the Ghana Bamboo Bike Initiative, which was created by Bernice Dapaah. This business markets itself as addressing climate change, poverty, youth unemployment, rural-urban migration and by creating jobs for women. As of 2015 over 1000 of these bikes had been sold in Ghana, Europe and the United States.

As of 2016 few bicycles have also been made in Bangladesh.

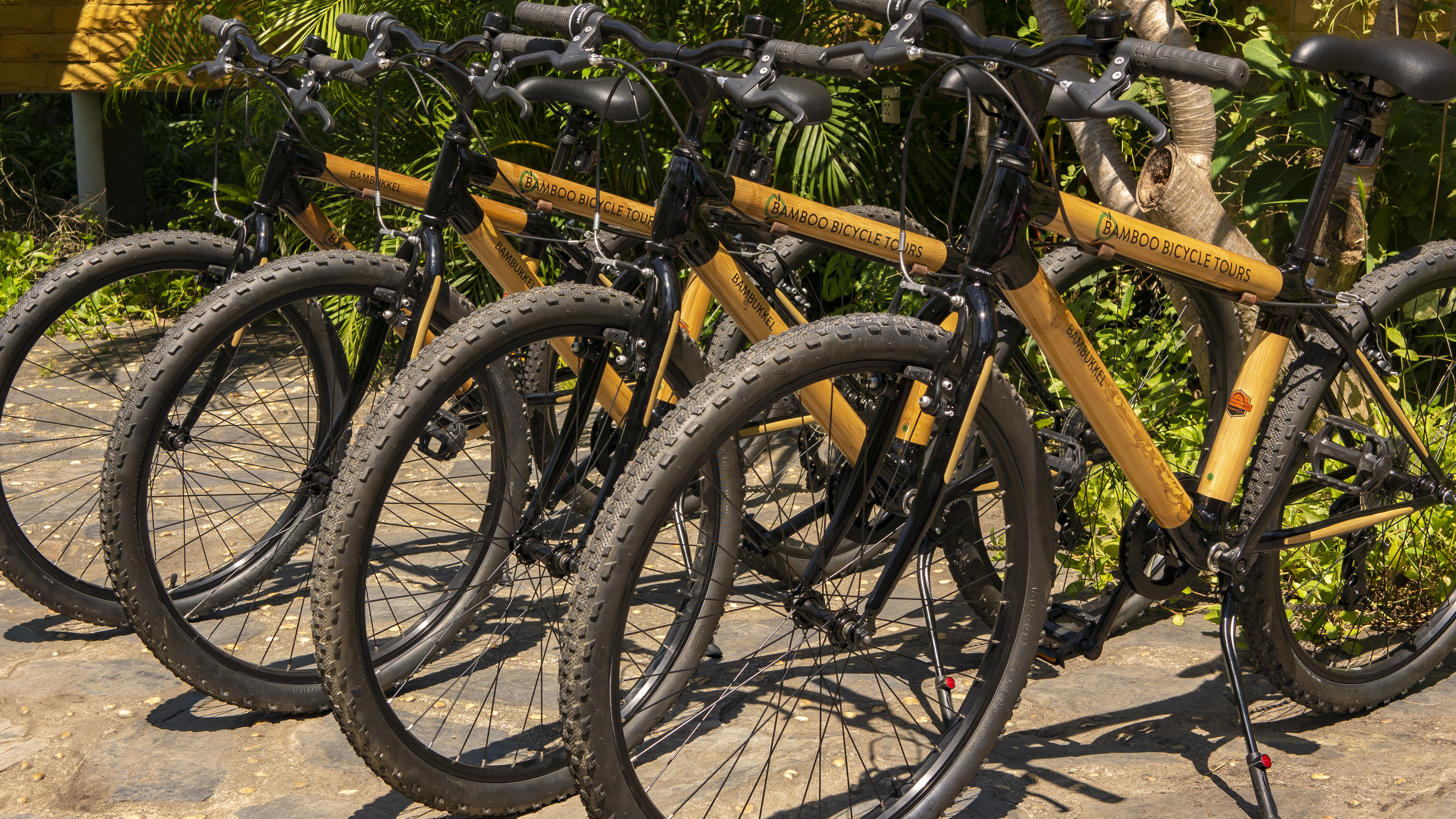
Bamboo Bicycle Tours bikes

In 2014 a Dutch company started organizing tours in Vietnam held on locally-built bamboo bicycles. In 2015 the company expanded to Thailand and in 2018 also to Myanmar. The bikes the tourists ride are all created in Thailand by the employees of Dutch entrepreneur Axel Lukassen and his local business partners.

In 2013 two women rode self-built bamboo touring bikes from London, England to Sydney, Australia. They showcased the strength of bamboo bicycles and the ability to make custom built bikes without the professional skills and knowledge that would be required to make steel or aluminium bikes. These were also at a small fraction of the cost of traditional frames.

== Cost ==
The most expensive bamboo bikes cost thousands of dollars. Conversely, the bikes sold in Ghana for the Ghana Bamboo Bike Initiative have been said to cost about $120, which is significantly more expensive than conventional bicycles. The cheapest for adults retail at $350 as of 2018, thus the bikes are retailed specifically for the export market.

This variation in cost has two main reasons: the relative wealth of the consumers to whom the bikes are marketed, and the difference in production quality. In the United States, all parts incorporated into the bike are high-end, similar to the parts used in expensive carbon fibre bikes. Modern machines are used to laminate, waterproof, and join the individual bamboo pieces. The Ghanaian bikes, on the other hand, use mostly parts (e.g. bamboo, chains, bolts, etc.) from low-cost sources.

== See also ==
- Cardboard bicycle
- Chukudu wood bicycle
- SplinterBike
- Wooden bicycle
