= Peanut butter wrench =

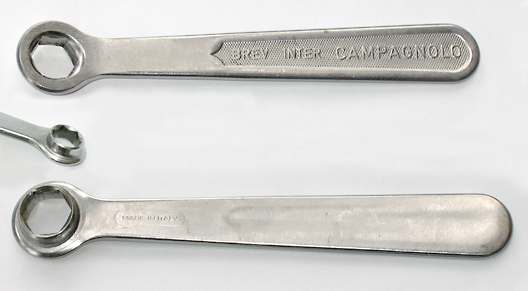
Campagnolo crank spanner, used to tighten or loosen the bolt (15 mm) which holds the crank to the bottom bracket spindle. Length is 17 cm.

A peanut butter wrench, also known as a crank bolt spanner or a crank spanner, is a single-ended box wrench or ring spanner used in cycling to tighten older 14 mm and 15 mm crank bolts, or the wheel nuts (track nuts) on hubs with solid axles commonly found on track bicycles, particularly the 15 mm wrench made by Campagnolo. This is the only one-piece wrench that can be used to tighten or loosen the bolt or nut which holds the crank to a square-taper bottom bracket spindle (although a thin-walled 15 mm socket and handle will also serve), whereas any wrench/spanner of the correct size will tighten or loosen wheel nuts.

While Campagnolo produces the wrench most commonly associated with the name Peanut Butter Wrench, several other companies made, or continue to make, a similar product. These companies include:

- Specialities T.A. (France) 2 known variations
- Stronglight (France)
- Park Tool (United States) Came in 14/15/16mm. Part number CCW14/15/16
- Zeus (Spain)
- Sugino (Japan)
- Suntour (Japan)
- Tacx (Netherlands)
- ATD- Artisan Tool and Die (United States)
- Elite (Italy)
- VAR (France)
- Williams (United Kingdom)
- Saavedra (Argentina)
- Cobra (Italy) 2 known variations
- Savoretti (Argentina)
- VeloSolo (United Kingdom)

Additionally, there were several variations of the traditional Campagnolo version*.

Its name is derived from the fact that the wrench handle is reportedly a good size and shape to scoop peanut butter (a fairly cheap energy food for track cyclists) out of the jar.
