= Bicycle accessories =

For bicycle accessories see:

- Accessories
- Accessories, repairs, and tools
- Bicycle Tools
