= Cardboard bicycle =

Bicycles created from cardboard

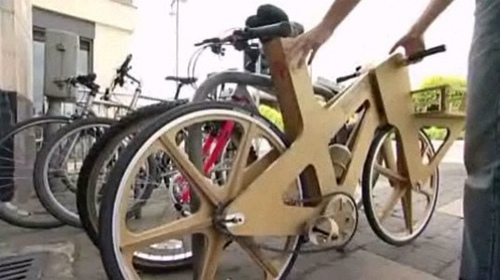
A cardboard bicycle by Phil Bridges

A cardboard bicycle is a bicycle composed mostly of cardboard. Only prototypes have been made as of 2012. Reported benefits include low cost, and construction from recyclable and renewable materials. The low cost is also expected to act as a theft deterrent.

== Phil Bridge's prototype ==
In 2008, Phil Bridge created a cardboard bicycle as part of a three-year degree course in Product Design at Sheffield Hallam University. It was intended to discourage theft, supports a rider up to 169 pounds (77 kg), and is constructed from a structural cardboard called Hexacomb. It is waterproof, but is only expected to survive six months of constant use. The drivetrain and brakes are metal, as on a conventional bike, and it rolls on standard pneumatic tires.

== Izhar Gafni's prototype ==
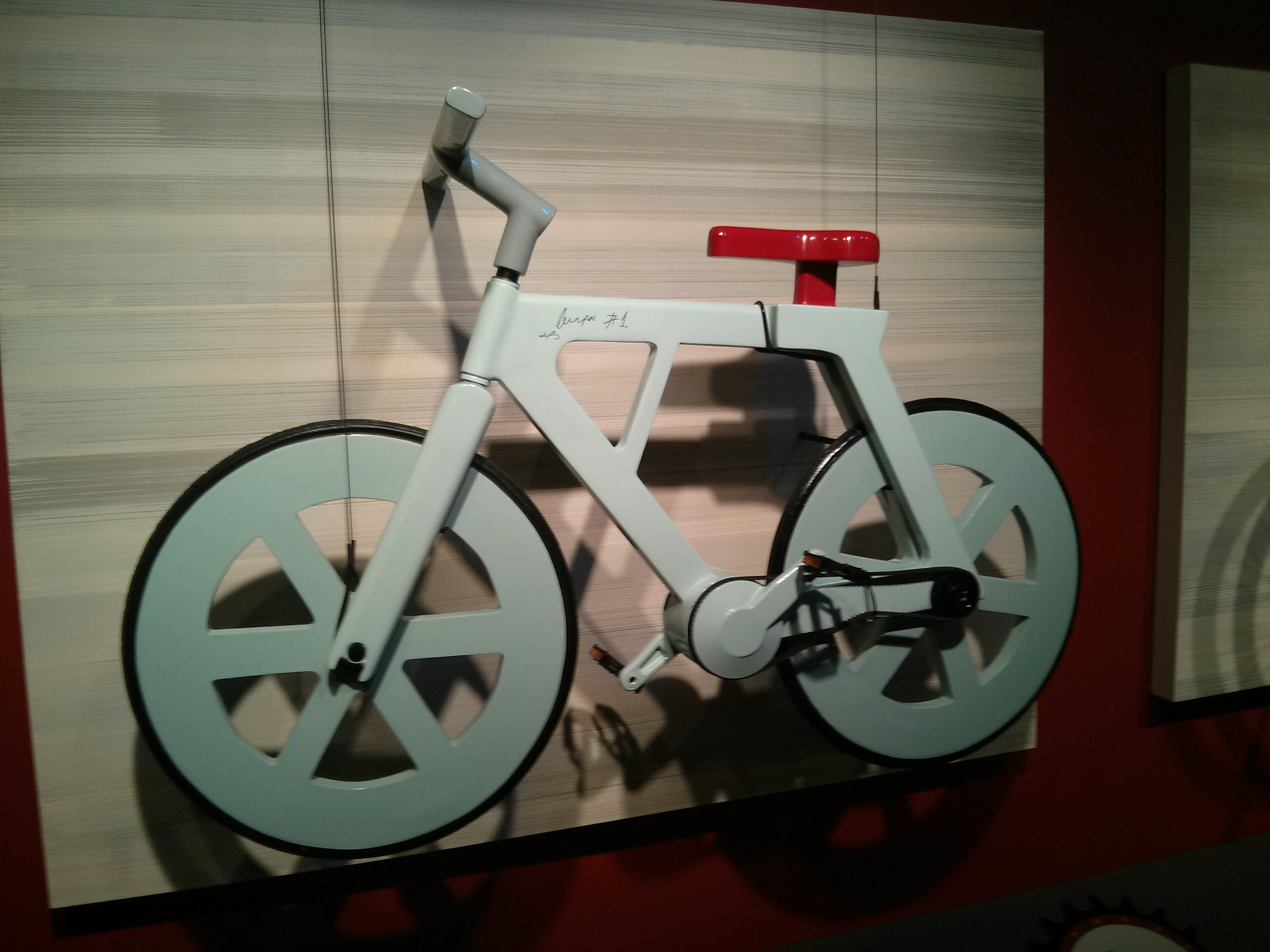
I.G. Cardboard Technologies cardboard bicycle.

In 2012, Izhar Gafni, an Israeli mechanical engineer and cycling enthusiast, unveiled a prototype bicycle made almost entirely out of cardboard in his workshop in Moshav Ahituv. The components, including bike’s frame, wheels, handlebars and saddle, consist of sheets of cardboard folded and glued together. The complete bike weighs 20 pounds (9.1 kg), and is treated to be fireproof and waterproof. Gafni reports that it can support riders up to 220 kilograms (490 lb). It has solid rubber tires made from recycled car tires. Power is transferred from the pedals to the rear wheel with a belt, also made from recycled rubber. Gafni and a business partner planned to mass-produce a bike based on the prototype and retail it for 20 USD, with a unit cost of 9 to 12 USD. The target market is low-income countries. The prototype was featured at the November 2012 Microsoft ThinkNext event in Tel Aviv. Gafni has been trying to raise $2 million on Indiegogo to fund the project. As of 25 June 2013, he had raised $10 thousand. The campaign has ended with a total of $40,107 raised.

== See also ==
- Bamboo bicycle
- Bikes Not Bombs
- Chukudu wooden freight bicycle
- Outline of cycling
- Wooden bicycle
- World Bicycle Relief
