= Joe Parkin =

Joe Parkin (5 February 1967) is a US-born cyclist who, at the suggestion of Bob Roll, moved to Belgium in 1985 at the age of 18 to race professionally. After six years as a journeyman European pro, competing is such events as Paris–Roubaix and Tour DuPont for such teams as Tulip, he moved back to the US, rode for the Coors Lite, and turned to mountain bike racing in 1995. He now works as editor for cycling magazines. He has written two books about his racing career: A Dog in a Hat and Come and Gone. He witnessed and speaks about the early days of EPO use in professional cycling.
