= Wooden bicycle =

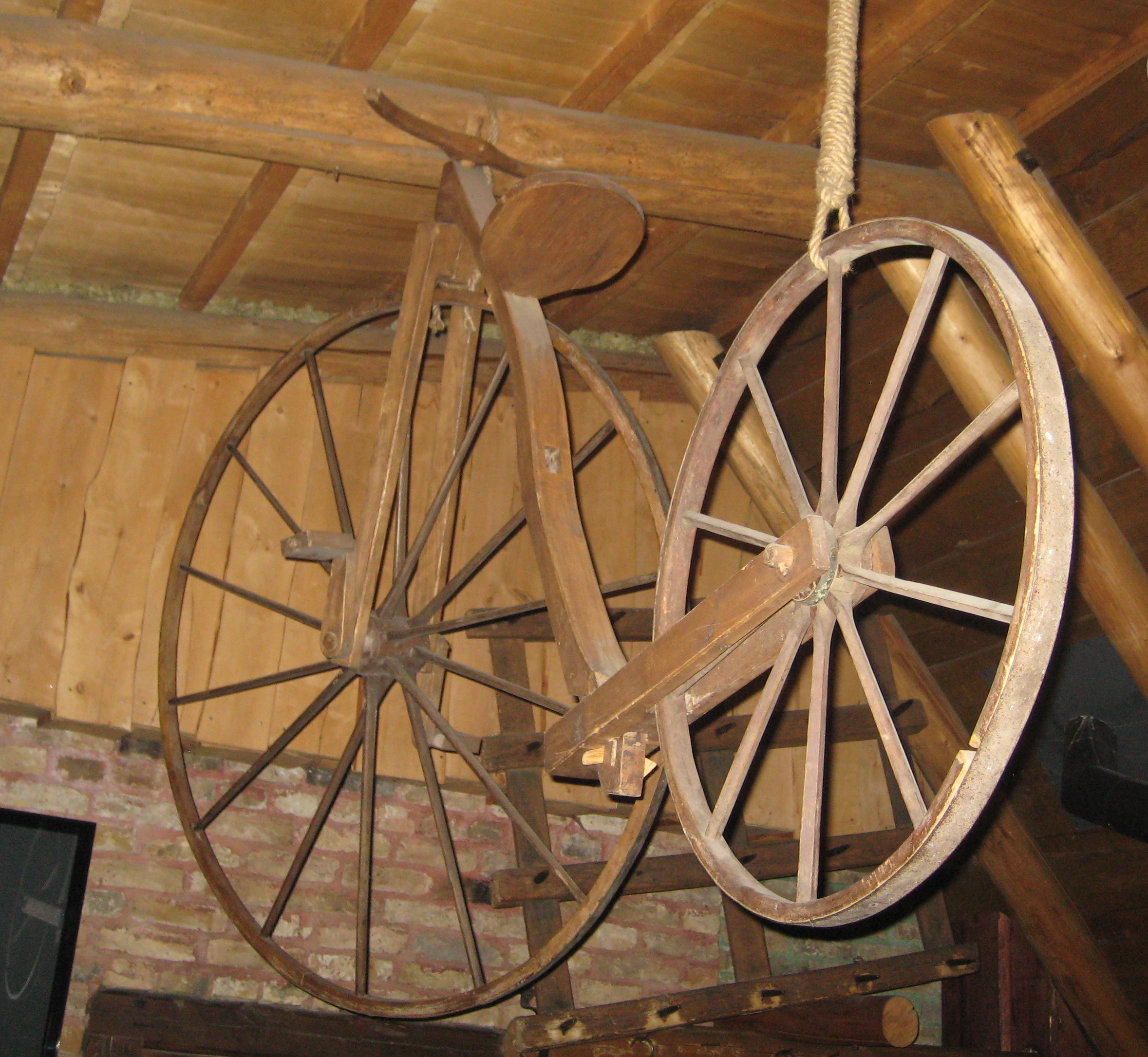
An antique wood bicycle hanging from the ceiling of the Marceliukės klėtis restaurant in Vilnius, Lithuania. Second half of the 19th century.

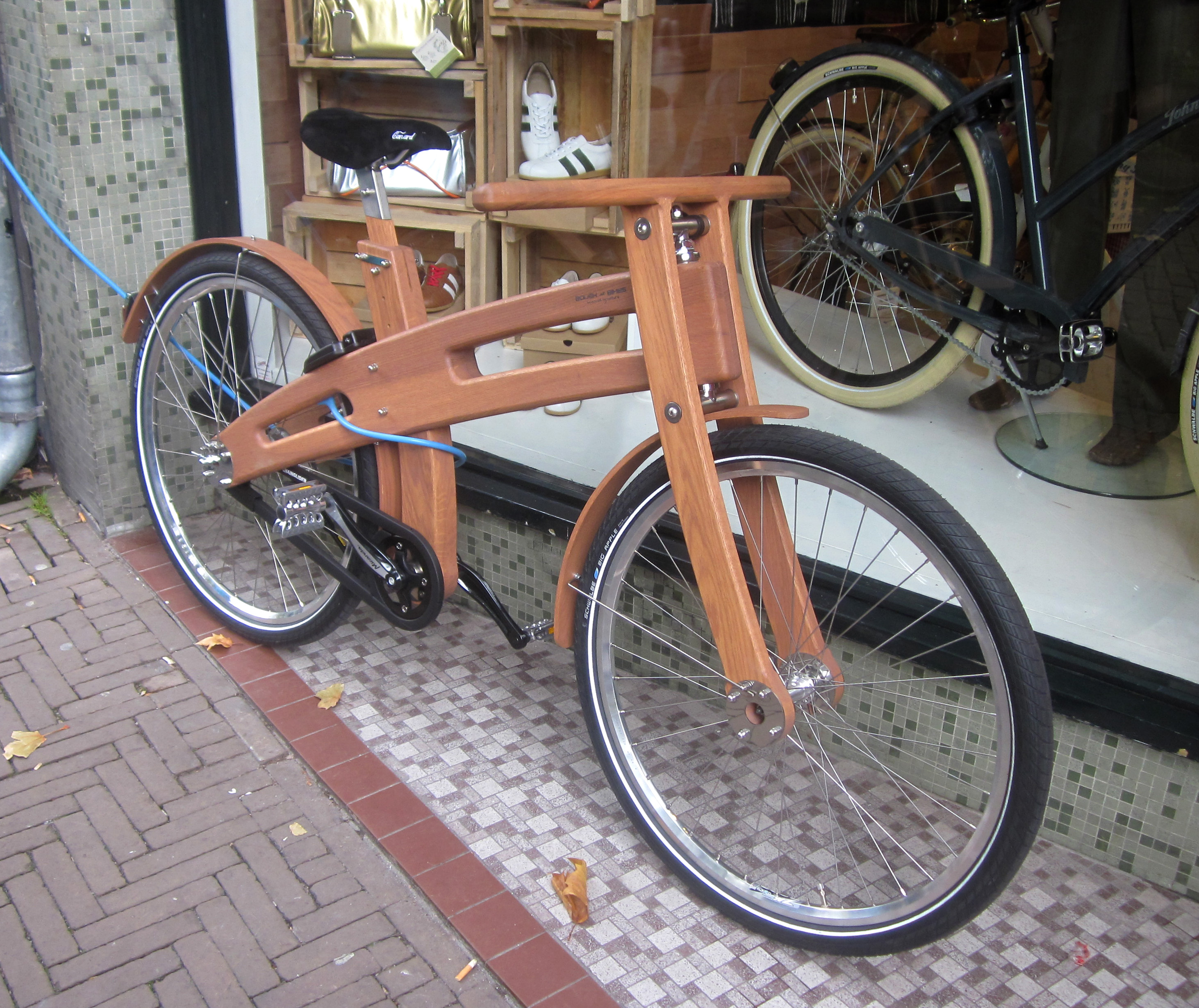
A modern wood Bough bike Sporty in Utrecht at the Oudegracht.

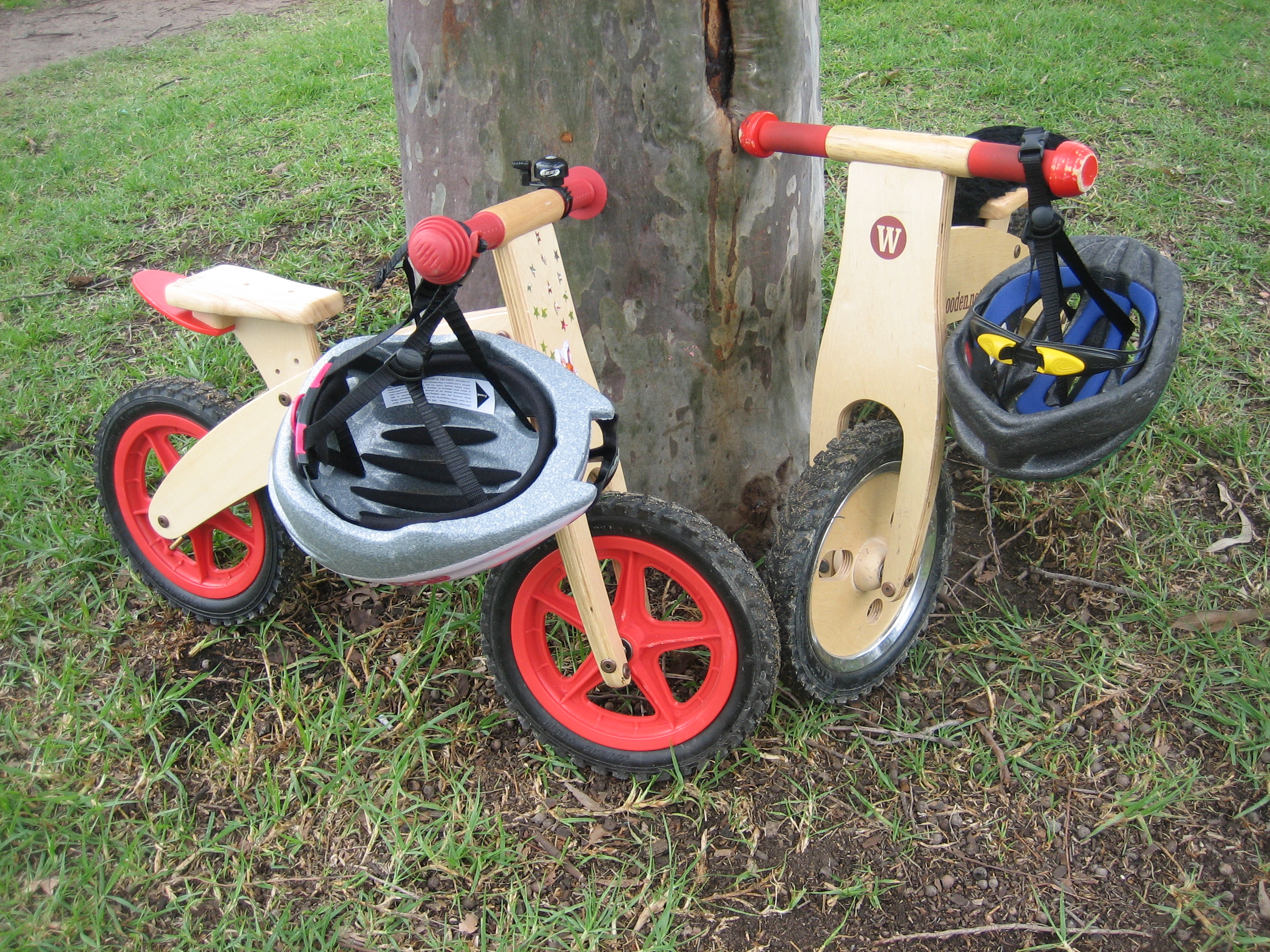
Modern wood balance bicycles.

A wooden bicycle is a bicycle constructed either mostly, or entirely from wood. Wood was the material used in the earliest bicycles, and is also used by modern builders, especially in balance bicycles for children. The wood can be either solid or laminate.

== History ==
The first bicycles recorded, known variously as velocipedes, dandy horses, or hobby horses, were constructed from wood, starting in 1817.

== Modern ==
Recent technological advances in adhesives and fabrication have made wood a feasible choice in the modern cycle world.

Wooden bicycle frames are sometimes aided by steel or composite lugs to connect the wooden tubes or attach components. These frames can be made with plywood, hardwoods, or bamboo.

HTech Bikes make wooden bicycles.

E-Bough debuted the first electric wooden bicycle in 2014. My Esel debuted the first electric wooden gravel bike at 2023 Eurobike.

== See also ==
- Bamboo bicycle
- Cardboard bicycle
- Chukudu wood bicycle
- SplinterBike

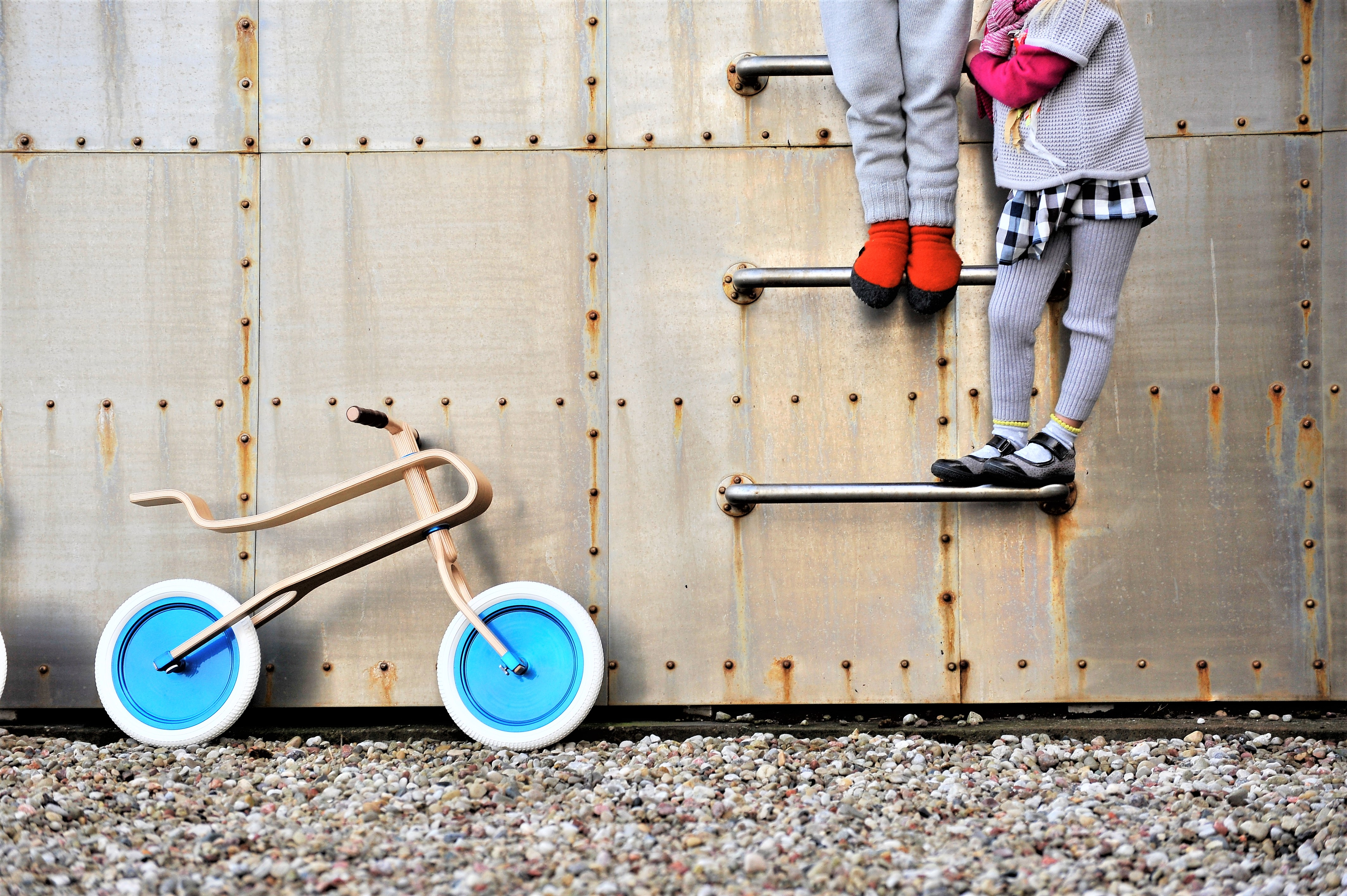
Wooden balance bicycle for children
