= Chukudu =

African kick scooters

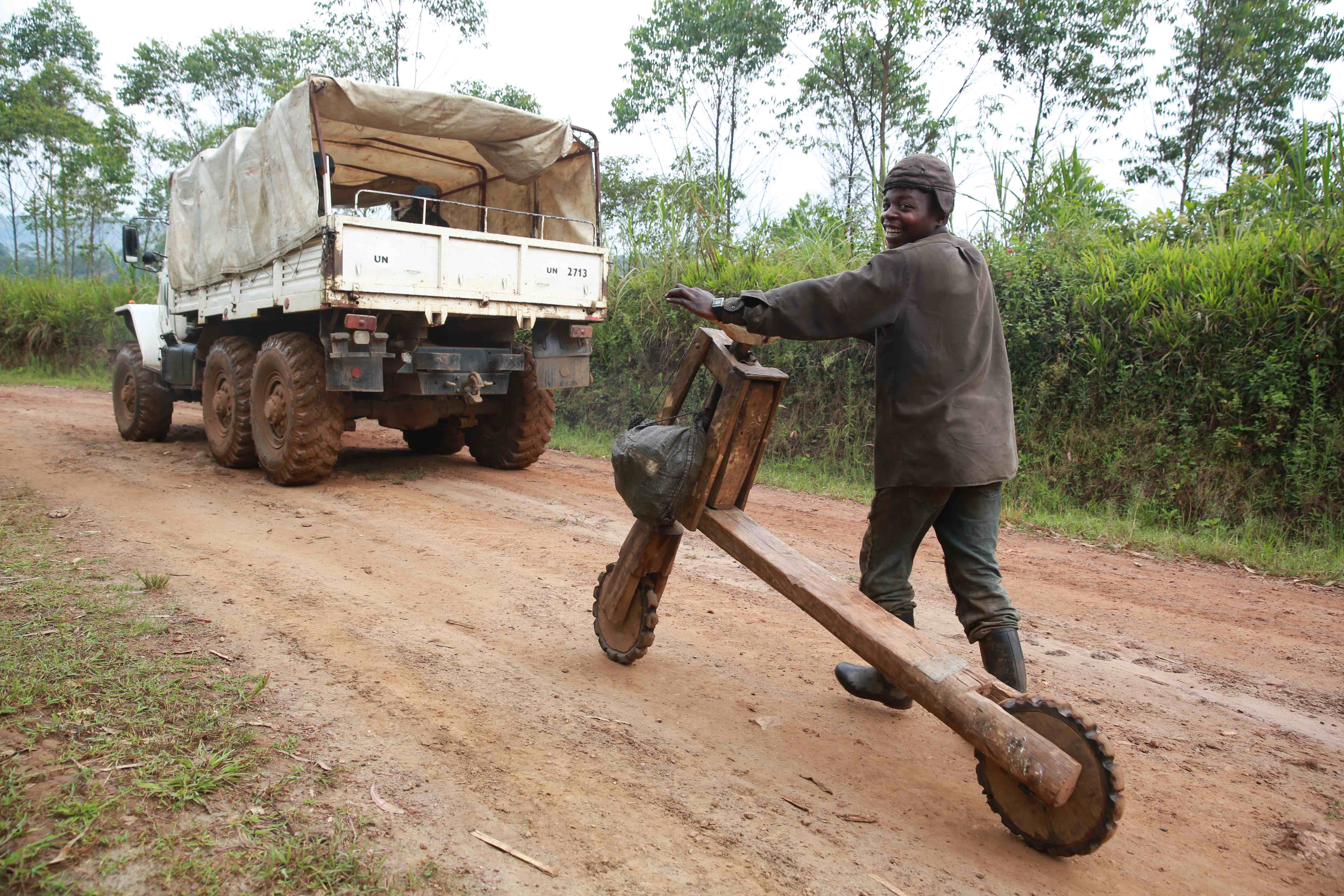
Young man pushing a chukudu in North Kivu.

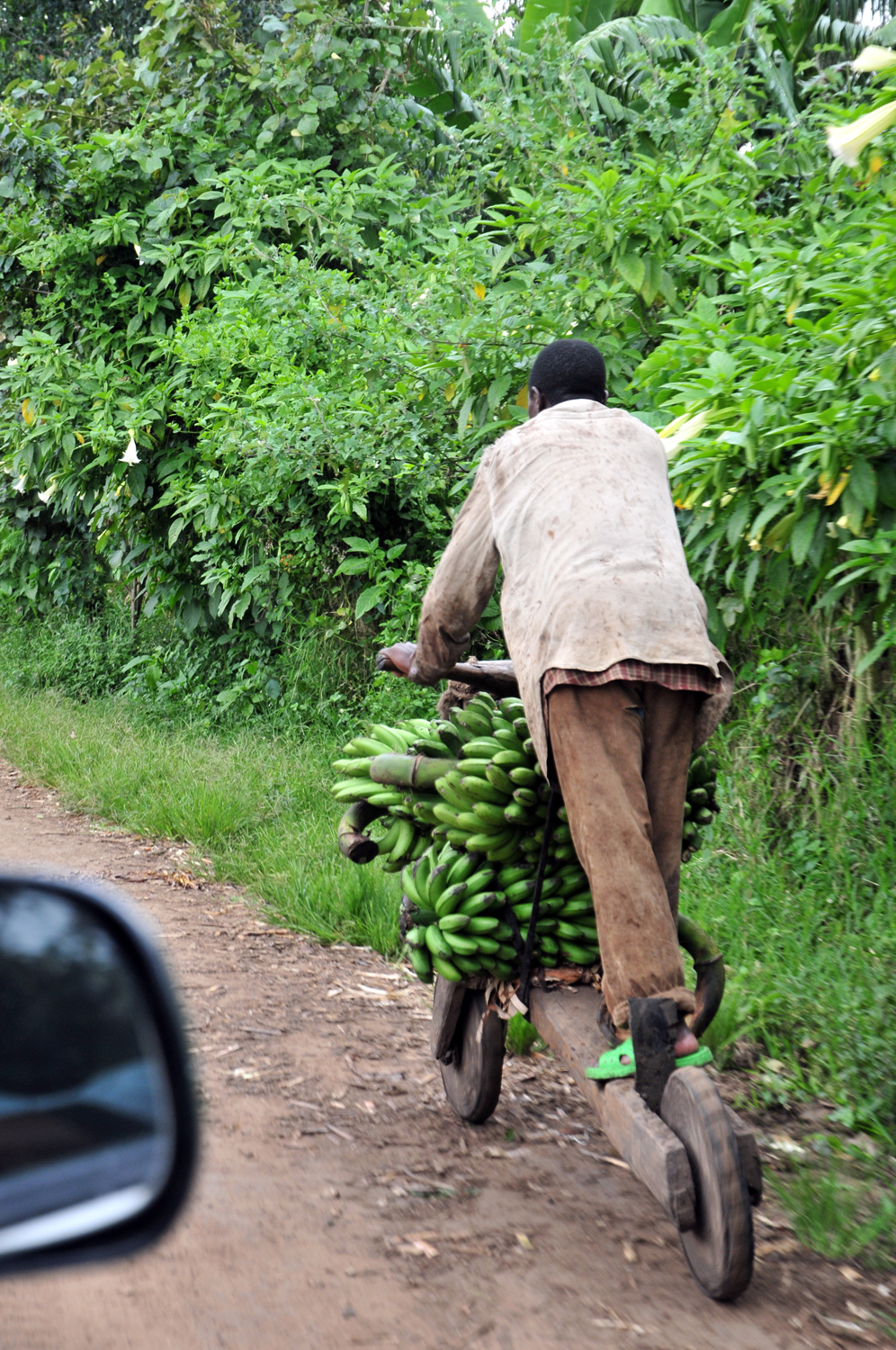
Transporting bananas by and riding a chukudu in North Kivu.

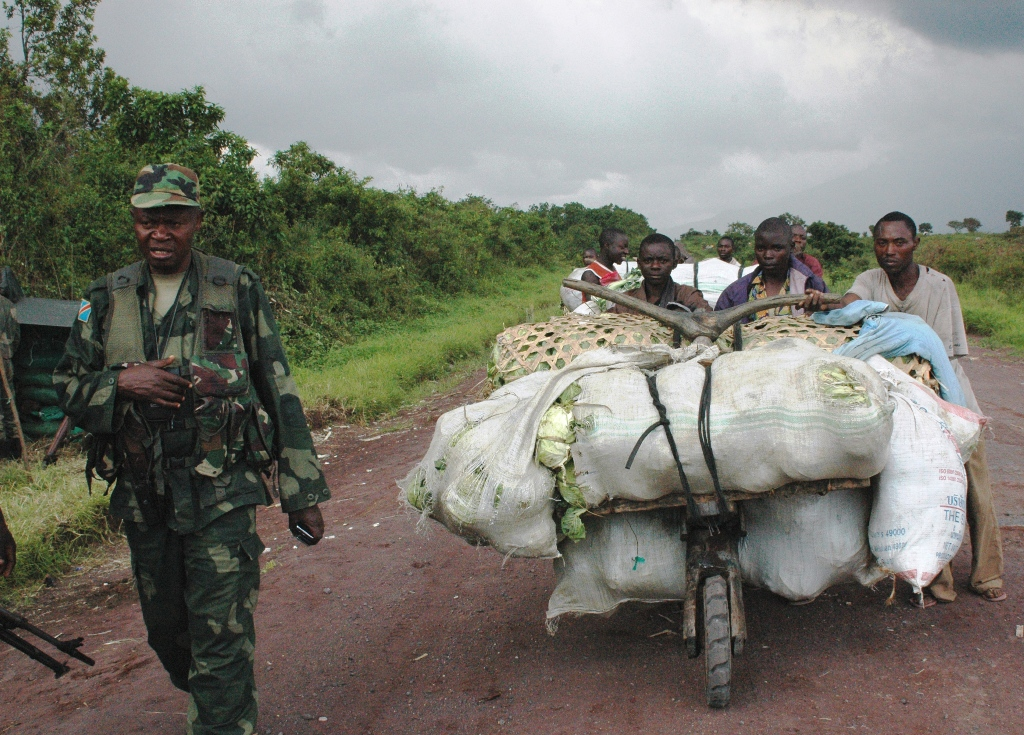
Transporting fresh produce at a military checkpoint in Goma.

The chukudu (or chikudu, chokoudou, tshukudu) is a two-wheeled handmade vehicle used in the east of the Democratic Republic of the Congo. It is made of wood, and is used for transporting cargo.

The chukudu generally has an angular frame, two small wheels (often of wood, sometimes wrapped with rubber), handlebars, and a pad for the operator to place their knee on while propelling the vehicle with their leg. On a descent, the rider stands on the deck like a kick scooter. On flat ground, the rider can put one knee on the deck and push the ground by the other foot like a knee scooter.

Rubber mud flaps and shock absorber springs may be added.

== History ==
Chukudus were first invented in 1972 by Pedro Sarracayo in North Kivu, during the difficult economic times under Mobutu Sese Seko. According to The Economist, they were "apparently invented in the 1970s by farmers on the mountain slopes around Goma to take produce downhill".

In 2008, chukudus were selling for US$100 with a cost of materials of nearly US$60. Similarly, in 2014 they cost $50 to $100 and were used to earn up to $10 per day, in an area where most people live on less than $2 per day. A 2014 article estimated a cost of about US$150, which a driver could pay off in about six months, earning $10–20 per day. Later, chukudus faced increased competition from cheap motorized tricycles.

== Construction ==
In Goma, where chukudus form the "backbone of the local transportation system", chukudus are made of hard mumba wood and eucalyptus wood, with scrap tires for wheel treads. These chukudus take one to three days to build, and last two to three years. The most commonly used size is about six and a half feet long, and carries a load of 1,000 pounds (450 kg). However, "the largest chukudus can carry up to 800 kilograms (1,800 lb)." Some chukudus are equipped with suspension to the front wheel, either in the form of a metal spring or of tensioned rubber bands.

A small chukudu can be built in about three hours, using dimensional lumber and materials available in a hardware store.

The chukudu is customizable to carry different types of cargo. To haul firewood some chukudus have a hole drilled in the middle of the sitting deck, and the operator can insert a stick to hold firewood in place. Others have a large basket to carry various loads.

== See also ==
- Cart
- Cargo bike
- Hand truck
- Wooden bicycle
