= Bicycle drivetrain systems =

Systems used to transmit power to bicycles and other human-powered vehicles

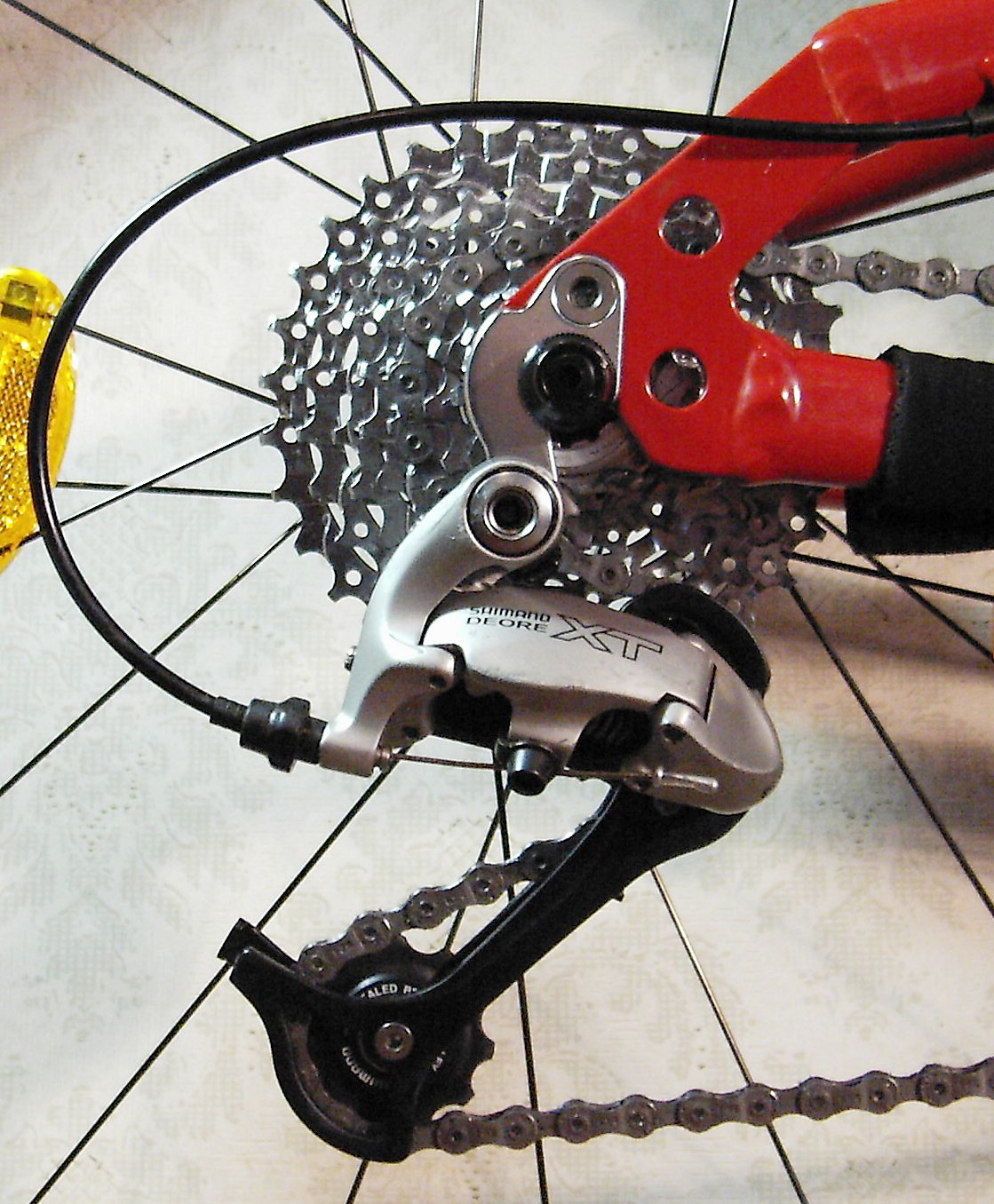
A chain drive and rear derailleur gear change, the most popular system in use today

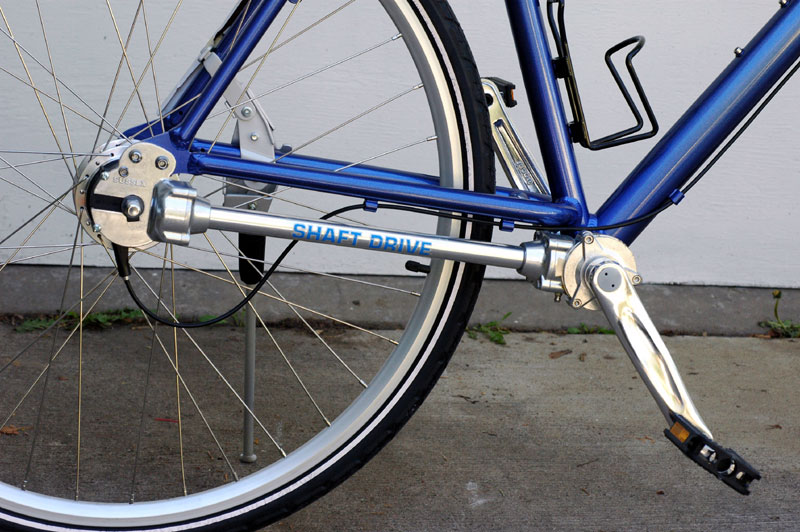
A shaft-drive with crankset and rear gear hub

Bicycle drivetrain systems are used to transmit power on bicycles, tricycles, quadracycles, unicycles, or other human-powered vehicles from the riders to the drive wheels. Most also include some type of a mechanism to convert speed and torque via gear ratios.

== History ==
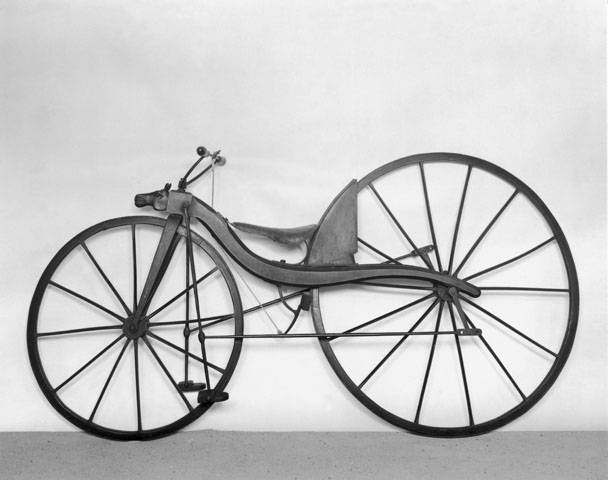
A treadle bicycle

The history of bicycle drivetrain systems is closely linked to the history of the bicycle. Major changes in bicycle form have often been initiated or accompanied by advances in drivetrain systems. Several early drivetrains used straight-cut gears that meshed directly with each other outside of the hub. Some bicycles have used a double-sided rear wheel, with different-sized sprockets on each side. To change gears, the rider would stop and dismount, remove the rear wheel and reinstall it in the reverse direction. Derailleur systems were first developed in the late 19th century, but the modern cable-operated parallelogram derailleur was invented in the 1950s.

- Draisine
- Penny-farthing
- Safety bicycle

== Power collection ==
Bicycle drivetrain systems have been developed to collect power from riders by a variety of methods.

=== From legs ===
- Crankset, groupset, and pedals
- Treadle bicycle
  - Vertical foot motion that mimics that of a climbing exercise machine
  - Treadmill bicycle.
  - Elliptical foot motion that mimics that of an elliptical trainer
    - ElliptiGO
- Swingbike, a fun-bike where both the front and rear fork can swing, so that the rider can turn both with their hips and with the handlebars, and thereby partially create propulsion with their hips
- Risigo, a fun-bike where the seat moves up and down in coordination with the crank, so that the hip prevents (or contributes to) propulsion
A rowbike

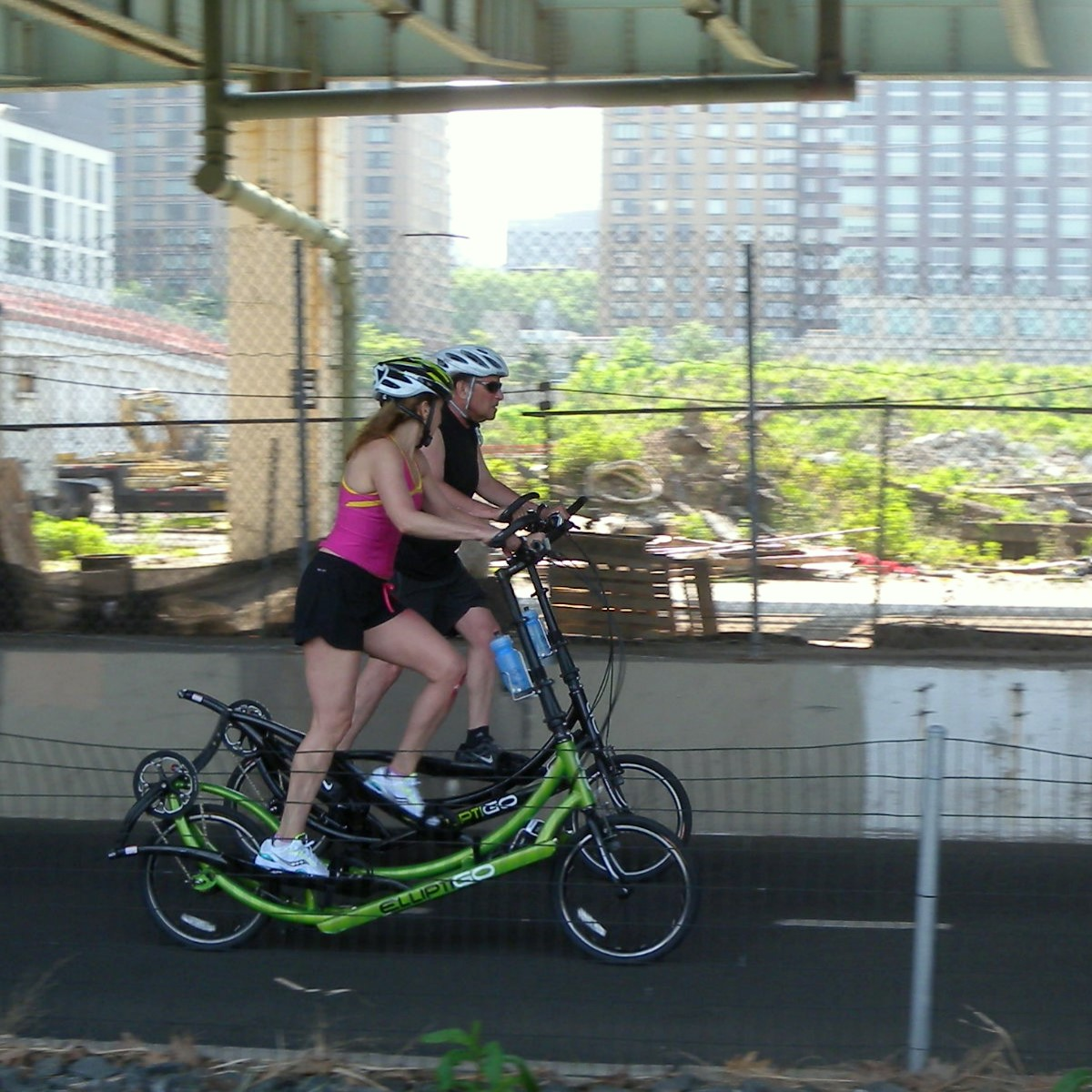
ElliptiGOs

=== From arms ===
- Handcycle

=== From whole body ===
- Rowing
- Hand and foot
- Exycle: from legs and chest

=== From multiple riders ===
- Tandem bicycle
- Sociable, tandem bicycle with side by side seating
- Conference bike, party bike or pedibus, a bike powered by the passengers, while steering and braking is controlled by a driver who does not provide pedaling power

== Power transmission ==
Bicycle drivetrain systems have been developed to transmit power from riders to drive wheels by a variety of methods. Most bicycle drivetrain systems incorporate a freewheel to allow coasting, but direct-drive and fixed-gear systems do not. The latter are sometimes also described as bicycle brake systems.

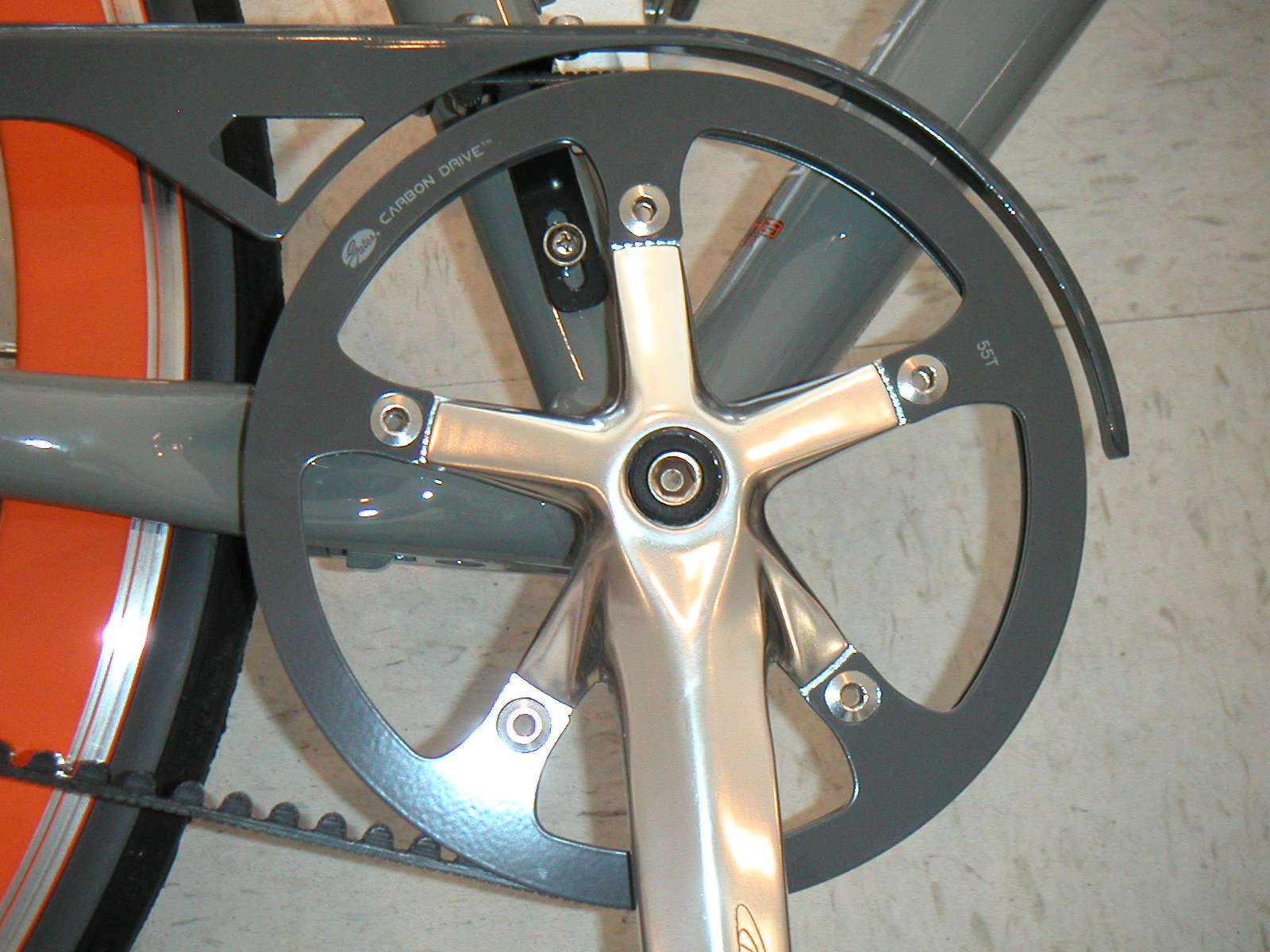
A belt-drive crankset

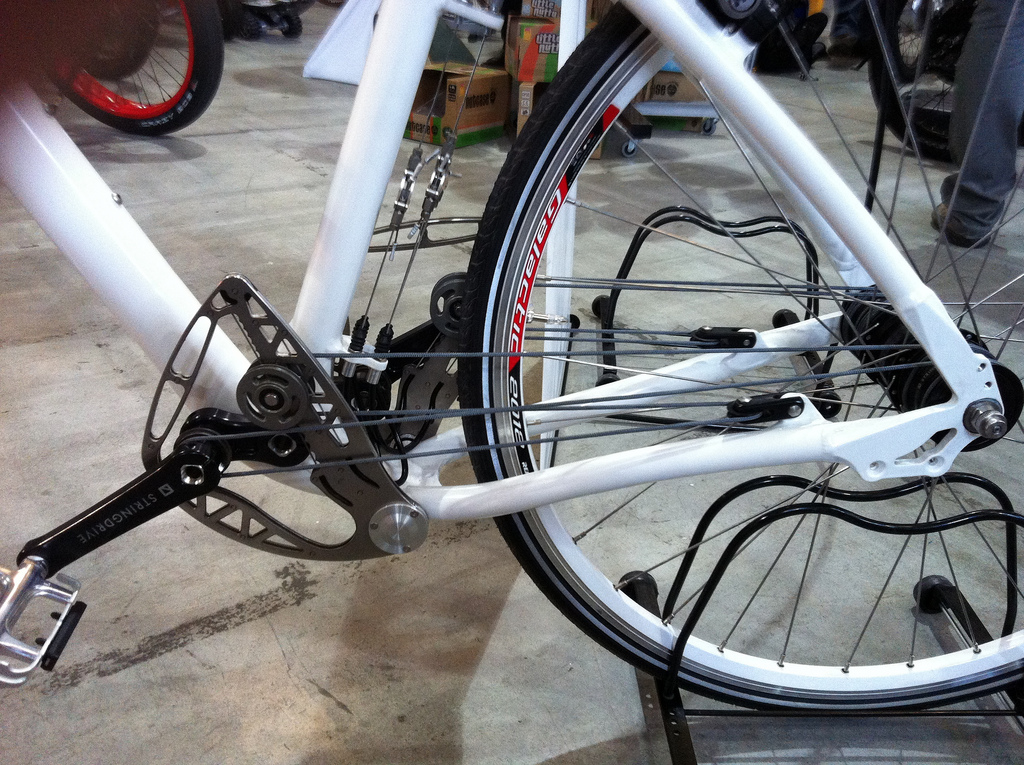
A wire rope and pulley drive on a stringbike

=== Direct ===
Some human powered vehicles, both historical and modern, employ direct-drive. Examples include most Penny-farthings, unicycles, and children's tricycles.

Another interpretation of direct-drive is that the rider pushes directly against the ground with a foot, as employed in balance bicycles, kick scooters, and chukudus.

=== Rotating ===
- Chain
  - Chainline
  - Master link
  - Micro drive
- Chainless
  - Belt
  - Shaft
  - Wire rope as in the stringbike and rowbike

=== Non-rotating ===
- Hydraulic
- Electric, in which turning the cranks generates electricity that then drives an electric motor in the rear wheel.

=== Two-wheel drive ===
In 1991, a two-wheel drive bicycle was marketed under the Legacy name. It used a flexible shaft and two bevel gears to transmit torque from the rear wheel, driven by a conventional bicycle chain with derailleurs, to the front wheel. In 1994, Steve Christini and Mike Dunn introduced a two-wheel drive option. Their AWD system, aimed at mountain bikers, comprises an adapted differential that sends power to the front wheel once the rear begins to slip. In the late 1990s, 2WD 'Dual Power' mountain bikes were sold in Germany under the Subaru name. They used one belt to transfer power from the rear wheel to the head tube, a small gearbox to allow rotation of the front fork, and then a second belt to transfer power to the front wheel.

== Speed and torque conversion ==
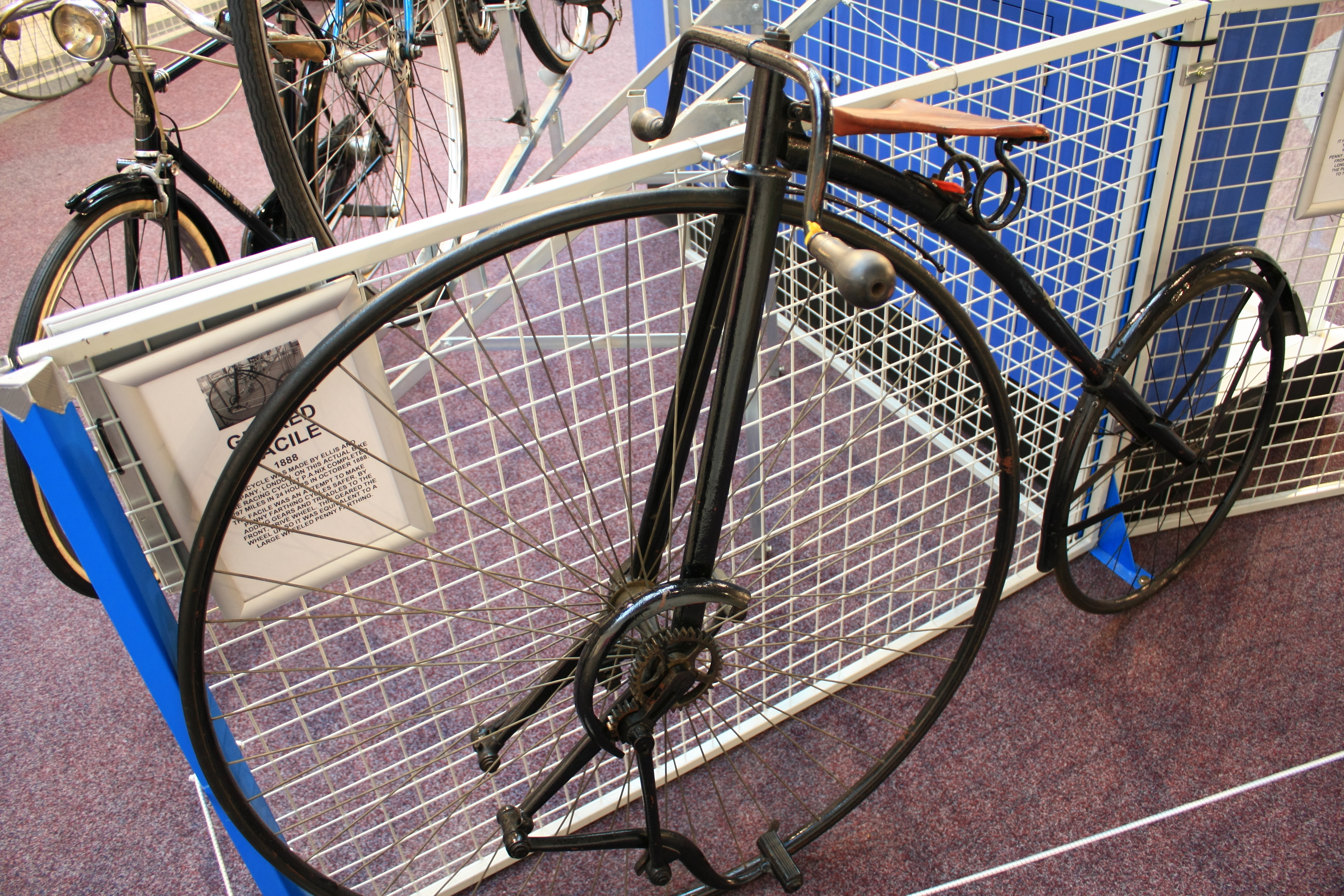
1888 Geared Facile Bicycle in the Coventry Transport Museum

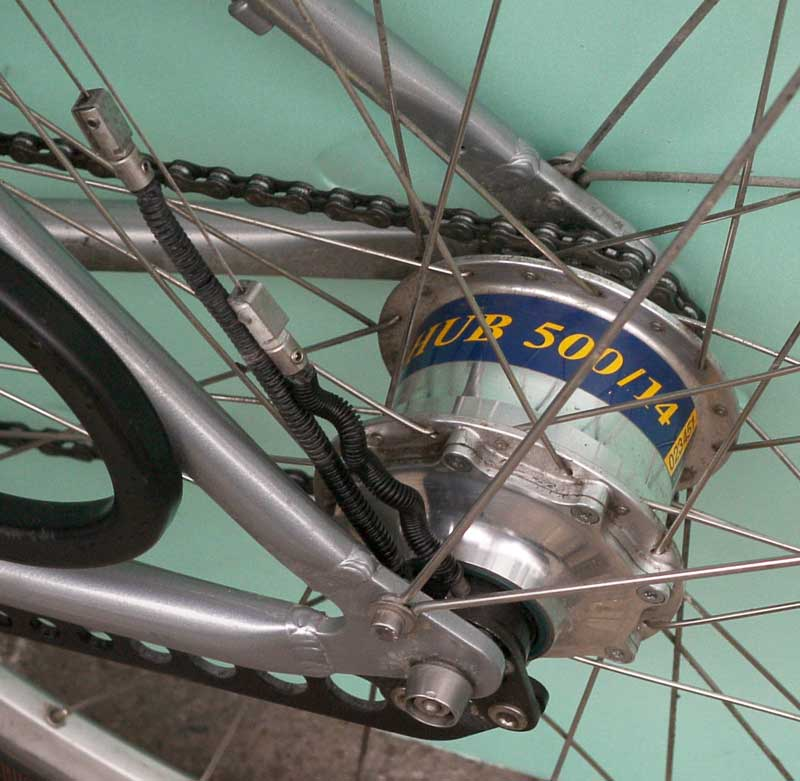
A chain-drive and rear gear hub

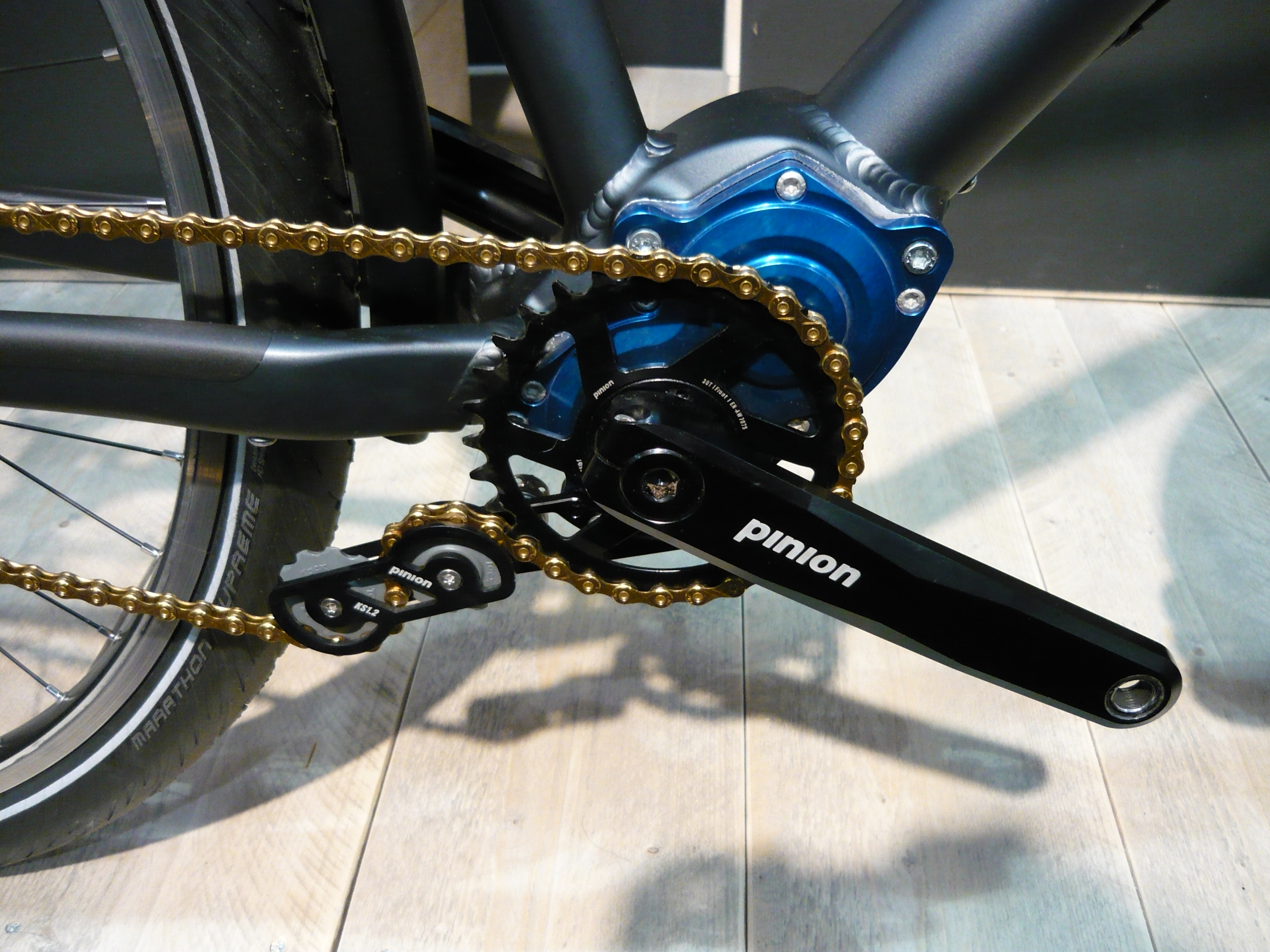
A bicycle gearbox with chain tensioner

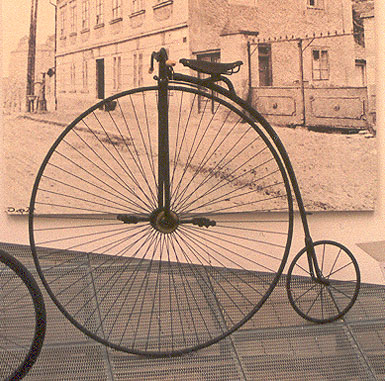
A penny-farthing with direct-drive

A cyclist's legs produce power optimally within a narrow pedalling speed range. Gearing is optimized to use this narrow range as best as possible. Bicycle drivetrain systems have been developed to convert speed and torque by a variety of methods.

=== Implementation ===
Several technologies have been developed to alter gear ratios. They can be used individually, as an external derailleur or an internal hub gear, or in combinations such as the SRAM Dual Drive, which uses a standard 8 or 9-speed cassette mounted on a three-speed internally geared hub, offering a similar gear range as a bicycle with a cassette and triple chainrings.

- Derailleur gears
  - Cogset
  - Crankset
- Hub gear
  - Continuously variable
- Gearbox bicycle
- Retro-direct
- Lever and cam mechanism, as in the stringbike

=== Control ===
- Shifters
  - Electronic gear-shifting system
  - Autobike

=== Theory ===
- Bicycle gearing
  - Gear ratio
  - Gear inches

=== Single-speed ===
- Single-speed bicycle
  - Fixed-gear bicycle

== Integration ==
While several combinations of power collection, transmission, and conversion exist, not all combinations are feasible. For example, a shaft-drive is usually accompanied by a hub gear, and derailleurs are usually implemented with chain drive.

== See also ==
- Bicycle gearing
- Comparison of hub gears
- List of bicycle types
- Outline of cycling

== Gallery ==
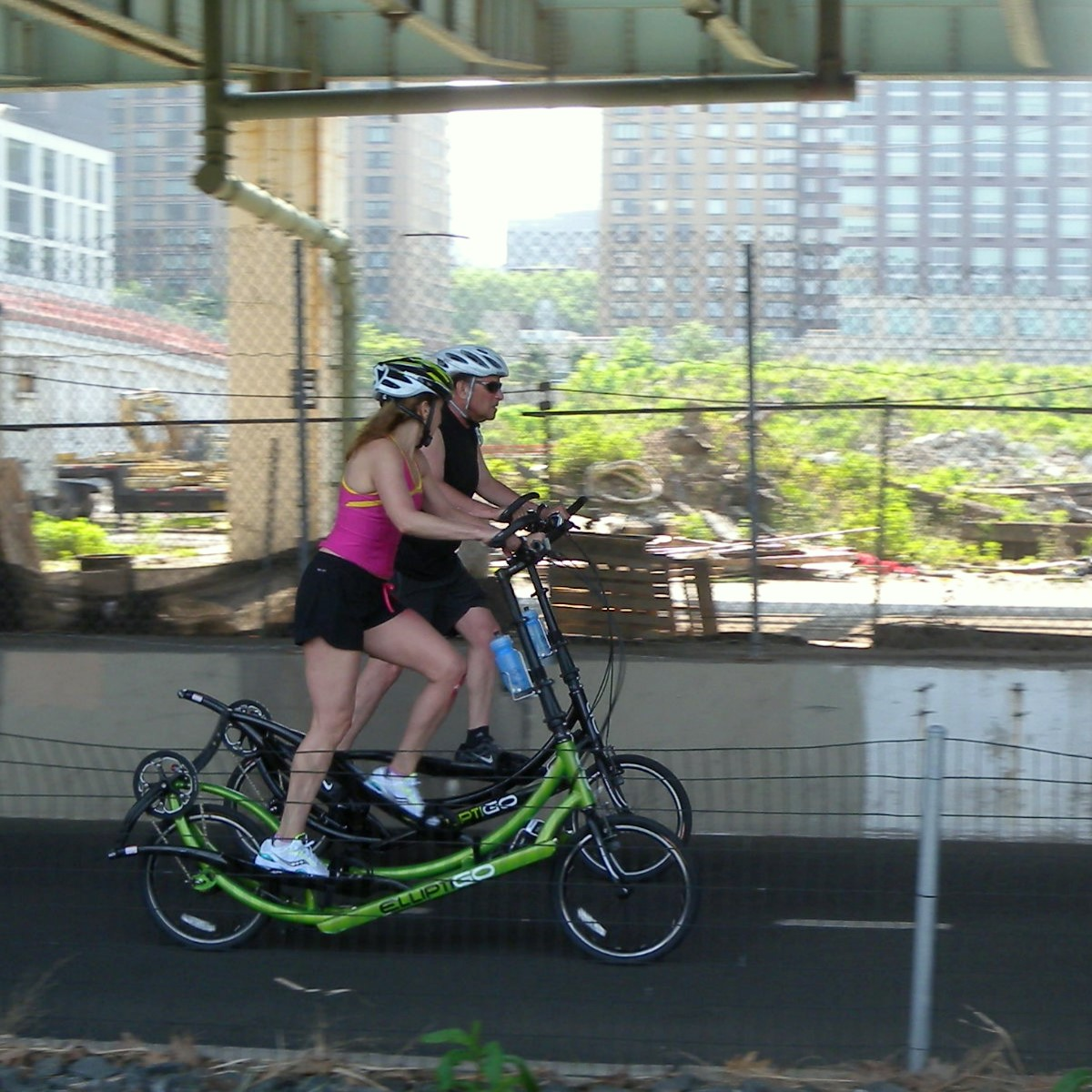
ElliptiGO uses motion similar to that of an elliptical trainer for motion on a modern treadle bicycle

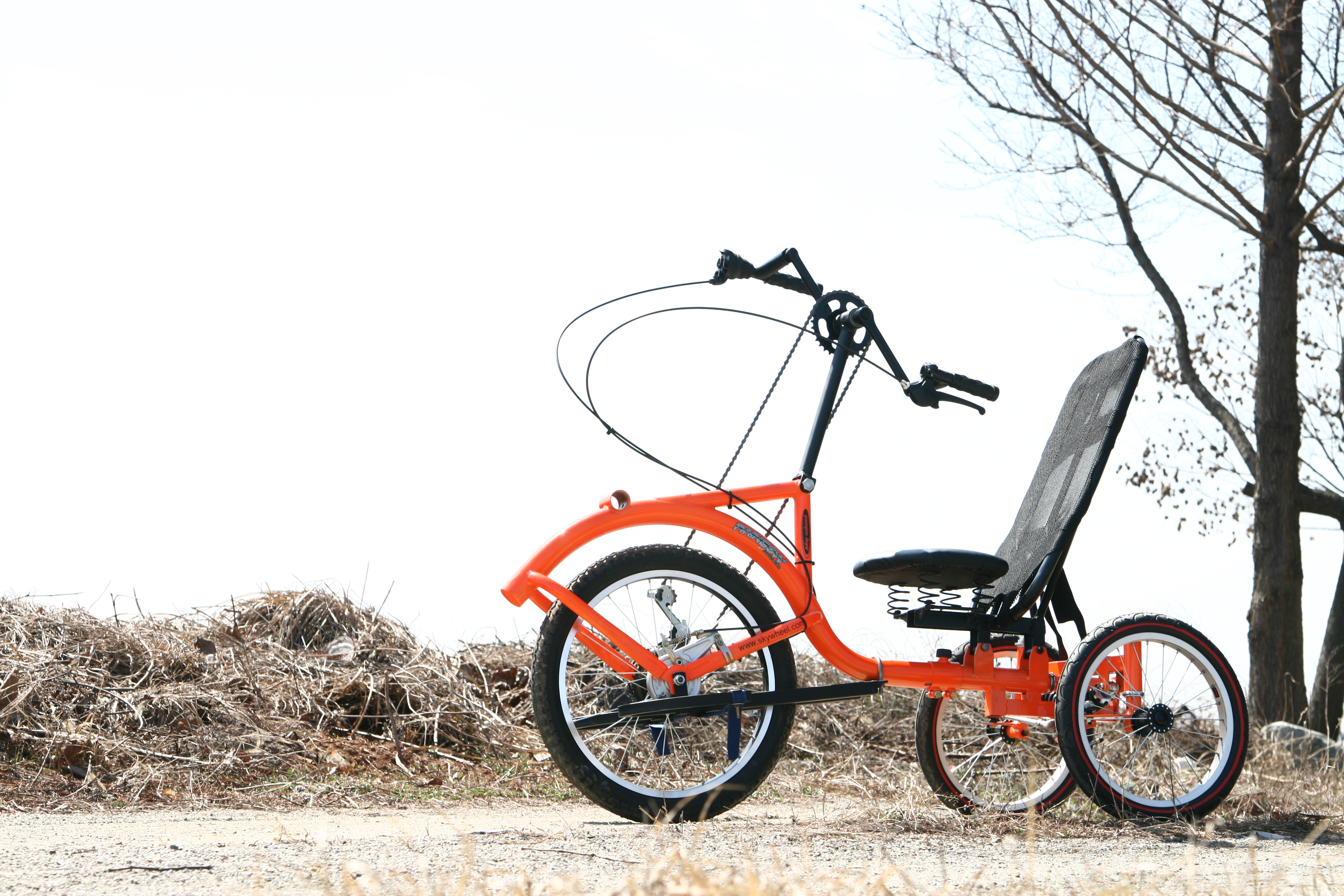
Hand crank on a tricycle

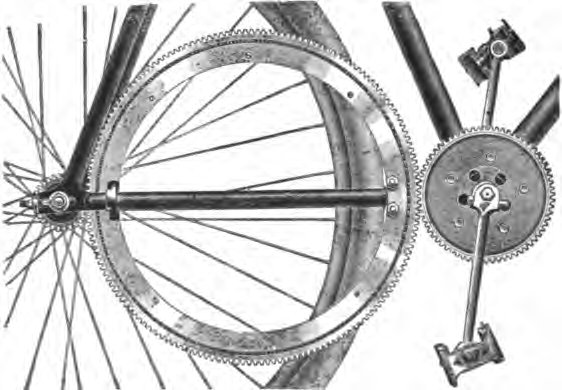
Hildick's chainless bicycle gear (1898)

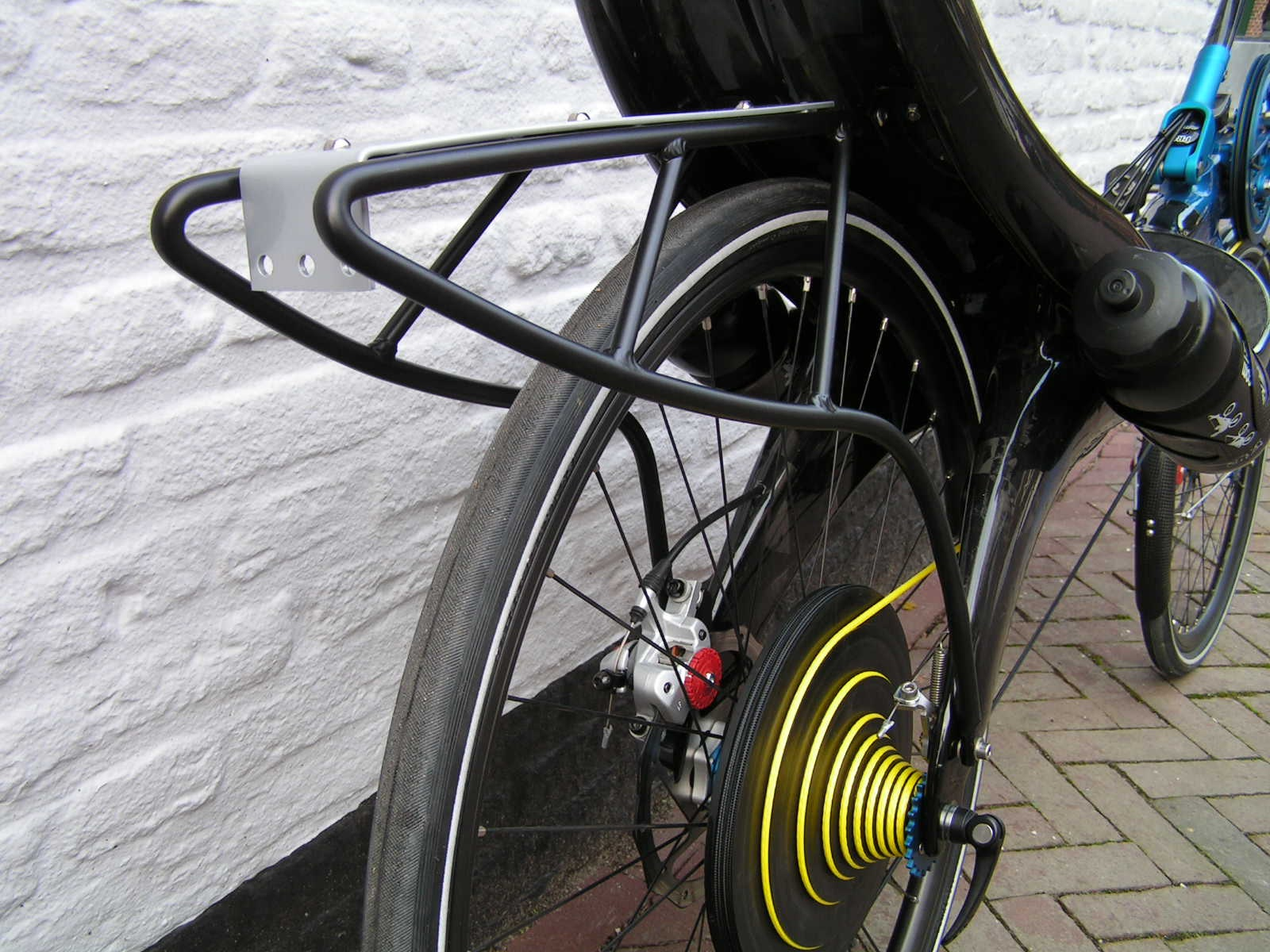
Cable of a row bike
