= Chainless bicycle =

Bicycle that uses a drivetrain other than a traditional metal chain

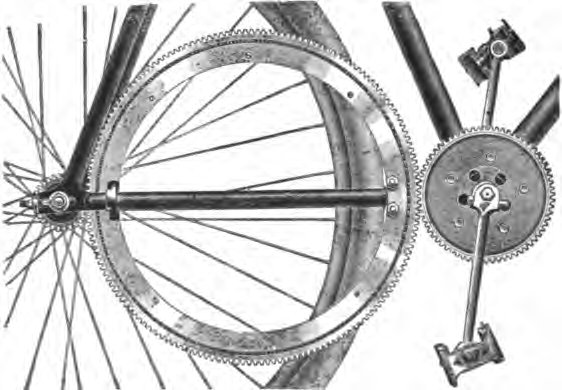
Hildick's chainless bicycle gear (1898)

Chainless bicycle or acatène is a bicycle that transmits power to the driven wheel through a mechanism other than a metal chain.

== Examples ==
- Directly driven bicycle (see penny-farthing and unicycle)
- Shaft-driven bicycle
- Belt-driven bicycle
- Hydraulic bicycle (and pneumatic bicycle)
- Hybrid vehicle (see series hybrid bicycle)
- Some rowed bikes use a cable or a linkage.
- Stringbike the pulley-driven Hungarian designed bike

== See also ==
- Bicycle drivetrain systems
- Outline of cycling
