= Hobson's joint =

Type of right-angle constant-velocity joint

An animation of a Hobson joint

A Hobson's joint or Hobson's coupling is a type of right-angle constant-velocity joint; rods bent 90° are able to transmit torque around a corner because they are all free to turn in their mounting holes in both legs of the coupling.

Hobson's joints are used to make elbow engines, a novelty device, but also for practical purposes in tools and shaft-driven bicycle gearing.
