= Elbow engine =

The method of operation of a single-cylinder elbow engine. Output is taken from one of the cylinder blocks. Two or more cylinders are invariably used so as to balance the centre of mass. Steam admission/exhaust plate not shown.

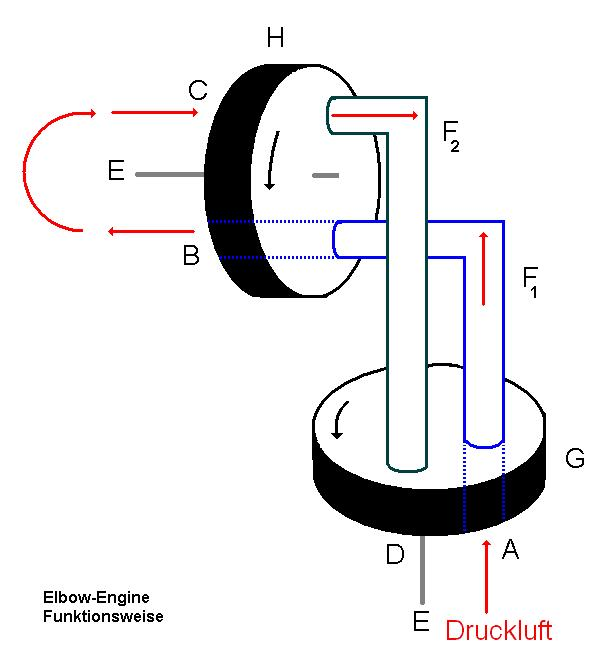
Diagram of simplified 2-piston elbow engine

An elbow engine is a piston-based steam engine typically fed by steam or compressed air to drive a flywheel and/or mechanical load. It is based on a mechanism known as a Hobson's joint. Although not commonly used today for practical purposes, it is still built by hobbyists for its rarity and unconventionality.

== Principle of operation ==
Elbow engines have two rotating, circular, cylinder blocks. Each block contains a ring of parallel cylinders and can itself rotate on a central axis, similar to a revolver cylinder. The two blocks are placed at 90° to each other. Each piston is L-shaped, and circular in cross section with one end fitted into each cylinder block. The two cylinder blocks rotate together, coupled only by the pistons. Engine output is taken from the rotation of one cylinder block.

Pressure is supplied to each cylinder by means of a fixed plate forming a plain thrust bearing with the back of the cylinder block. This has two openings in it which supply and exhaust steam to and from the cylinder; as the cylinder block rotates it opens and closes communication with each pipe. This method of valveless steam admission is also used on many basic oscillating cylinder engines. This arrangement results in a compact engine with a low part count, at the expense of including a large frictional surface.

== Problems ==
Despite their apparent simplicity, elbow engines can be difficult to troubleshoot. They are also known to splatter oil when operating.
