= Hydristor =

Hydristor

Hydristor is a joining of the words 'hydraulic' and 'transistor'. The device invented by Tom Kasmer in 1996 and is based on the dual pressure balanced hydraulic vane pump invented by Harry F. Vickers in 1925.

== Vane pump details ==
The Vickers design included an elliptic chamber which confined the radial motion of the vanes nested in the rotor slots. As the rotor and vanes turn, each vane is first pushed radially inward followed by a maximum radial extension and that happens twice per revolution. The displacement of the fixed device is calculated by determining the difference in vane extension between minimum and maximum, times the axial length of the vanes and rotor. This multiplies to an area subject to the hydraulic pressure in the device whether used as a motor or a pump. Then an average of the minimum and maximum extensions establishes a 'radius of motion' for the pressurized equivalent pressure/force area. of each vane which passes one of the 4 axial sealing areas. What happens is that this equivalent area patch travels through the circumference or the equivalent linear distance resulting from rotating the 'radius of motion' through one complete revolution of 360 degrees.

The elliptic chamber is called a 'cam ring' by the industry. As a vane moves into, say, a maximum extension, and then rotates into a minimum extension region of the cam ring, it passes through a gradual transition from maximum to minimum followed by a gradual transition back to maximum and this happens twice per revolution. In order to prevent oil under pressure from bypassing the vanes, 4 sealing areas are created by means of 4 kidney shaped ports located in the transition areas between minimum and maximum. The spaces between the kidney ports are called the sealing areas and this port system is located at either, or both axial ends of the rotor and vanes. The configuration of the ports and sealing areas are such that the space between any two adjacent vanes is slightly less than the coverage of the sealing area. In other words, as the vanes rotate through the sealing area, for a small amount of rotation, both adjacent vanes are within the sealing area. As the rotation continues, the first vane in line leaves the sealing area, but not before the next vane in succession is firmly in the sealing region.

The effect is to prevent the exchange of oil from any two adjacent chambers located on either side of a given sealing area and the oil can only be interchanged by the actual rotation of the rotor and vanes. This is the pumping mechanism for the historical vane pump or motor. The term 'pressure balanced' comes from the fact that pressure in any chamber is matched by the same pressure in the diametrically opposite chamber and the hydraulic radial side thrust calculated by a 'side view area' and the two forces are opposite and cancel; hence the name 'pressure balanced'.

== Hydristor details ==
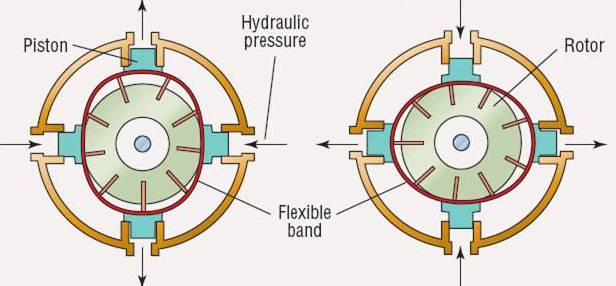
Hydristor

There are several problems with the historical design. The vane tips radially contact the cam ring elliptic surface and cause a significant friction as the rotor and vanes turn. This friction is both pressure dependent and speed squared dependent due to RPM-squared centripetal forces. The speed is limited to about 6-7,000 RPM and the pressure is limited to about 2,500 PSI. Another pressure-related problem is that the pressure forces into the axial rotor to stationary kidney endplate clearance and buckles the device ends thus increasing fluid blowby referred to as 'volumetric efficiency'. Typically, vane pumps and motors have two external ports but there are actually two separate sets of chambers which form two separate pumps and motors. The internal plumbing is y-connected to create only two external ports.

For the Hydristor. a 'concentric nesting of endless metal belts' replaces the fixed elliptic cam ring. And, all the vane tips contact the inner surface of the belt. The historical friction of the vane tips now causes the belt set to rotate at approximately the same speed as the rotor and vanes, but there is a very slight 'walking behind' of the vane contact area and there is a very slight speed slippage which results in the inner belt wear being spread out and this results in much longer belt life. Also, the belt set now confines the pressure and speed-squared forces like a pressure vessel and the potential speed of operation is very much higher. The result of all this is to raise both the operating pressure and the operating speed and this amounts to a 10 times increase in hydraulic packaging density and similar decrease in weight per unit power.

== Related patents ==
There are 4 US and international patents on this device:

- US6022201 - Hydraulic vane pump with flexible band control - filled May 14, 1997
- US6527525 - Hydristor control means - filled Feb 8, 2001
- US6612117 - Hydristor heat pump - filled Feb 20, 2002
- US7484944 - Rotary vane pump seal - filled Aug 11, 2004

== Hydristor efficiency ==
The fixed relationships of the elliptic cam ring are replaced by 4 curved surface (cupped) movable pistons located at the 4 sealing areas, at 12,3,6, and 9 o'clock like the face of a clock. The curvature of each piston rides on a 'hydrodynamic oil bearing' similar to hydroplaning tires in the wet and this virtually eliminates metal-to-metal contact and friction. The first Hydristor achieved almost 95% efficiency overall and the present designs are in the 97+% range. If the 4 pistons are positioned equidistant from the center of rotation, no oil is expressed or accepted by any of the kidney ports. This is called 'neutral'. For a clockwise rotation, if 3 and 9 pistons are moved inward with 6 and 12 moving outward, all moving an equal amount, then a device displacement in proportion to the piston movement is created. If the 6 and 12 pistons were moved in with 3 and 9 moving equally out, then all the oil flows reverse. Since the piston positions are infinitely variable, any possible displacement between zero and + or - maximum displacement can be created. If two such Hydristor units are packaged face-to-face with the 4 port kidney plate between them, an infinitely variable transmission is formed. This transmission can select any ratio in the forward direction and in the reverse direction without the need for any gears.

== Hydristor value ==
A 2006 article for COE NewsNet discusses a few details related to the design and test of the Hydristor. In this article, the Appendix provides some overarching concepts that are important for evaluation of the Hydristor and related technologies. As an infinitely variable transmission, the Hydristor could help extend car longevity in the same way any other infinitely variable transmission can - by lowering the engine speed to a necessary minimum. As an example, recent Honda Civic IVT needs only 1400 engine RPM to travel at highway speeds.

== Example use ==
Because the Hydristor is more easily packaged as a thin, large diameter device, it is easy to create a torque converter shape which, with the proper adapters, can fit any existing vehicle. Thus a few 'standard' Hydristors can be made which, with adapters will fit everything making the technology completely retrofittable into the entire highway fleet. As engine rpm is now variably decoupled from wheel speed, the engine can run at its most efficient point at all times. With the very fast response time of the Hydristor, a change in demand allows the engine to quickly hit the desired point without interrupting power flow.

=== Regenerative braking and hybrid vehicles ===
The Hydristor torque converter can also accomplish total hydraulic braking and energy storage. Once a cruising speed has been achieved with front and rear Hydristors at some appropriate relative displacements, hydraulic braking is achieved by first simultaneously reducing both front and rear to zero displacement, then leaving the front Hydristor at zero (thus hydro mechanically disconnecting the engine from the torque converter hydraulic circuit and finally beginning to increase rear displacement as a braking function with the braking pressure and flow being directed to a hydraulic accumulator pressure tank. The decaying vehicle speed (kinetic energy), the rising tank pressure and the desired rate of deceleration determined by the driver all are variables which are easily managed by the Hydristor system. The stored braking energy can then be re-used for subsequent re-acceleration. With hydraulic storage capability, the acceleration at highway speeds can result in wheel spin.

The installation of a Hydristor torque converter into a typical car or truck already on the highways will create a hybrid vehicle which will out-perform the current crop of hybrids, thus adding other alternatives to that technology. One benefit of this approach is that the existing fleet can be re-configured thereby incurring monetary and natural resource savings.

== Criticism ==
There are no independent tests to verify these claims for the Hydristor, and problems of excessive parts wear have yet to be overcome, making practical applications of this device unlikely.

== Death of inventor ==
Thomas E. Kasmer died on October 27, 2011, from a heart attack. The Hydristor web site was shut down effective December 31, 2012, by the person who had been hosting it for him pro bono.

== See also ==
- Hydraulics
- Hydraulic bicycle
