= Jaw coupling =

Mechanical coupling

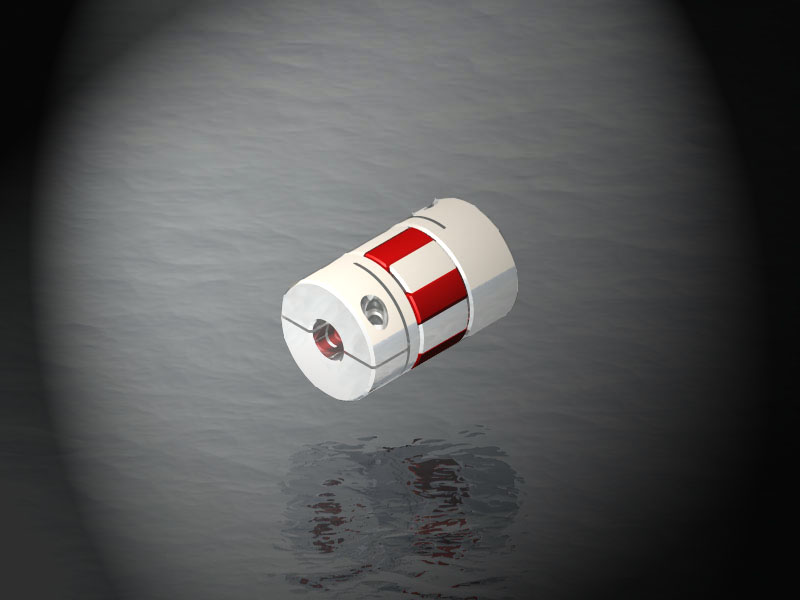
Computer drawing of a curved jaw coupling

In mechanical engineering, a jaw coupling is a type of general purpose power transmission coupling that also can be used in motion control (servo) applications. It is designed to transmit torque (by connecting two shafts) while damping system vibrations and accommodating misalignment, which protects other components from damage. Jaw couplings are composed of three parts: two metallic hubs and an elastomer insert called an element, but commonly referred to as a "spider". The three parts press fit together with a jaw from each hub fitted alternately with the lobes of the spider. Jaw coupling torque is transmitted through the elastomer lobes in compression.

== Coupling ==
The elastomer of the spider can be made in different materials and hardnesses, which allows the user to customize the coupling to best serve their application. Considerations for elastomer selection include ability to damp vibration, ability to handle misalignment, operational temperature range, speed of equipment, and chemical conditions.

Jaw couplings are considered "fail-safe" because, should the elastomer fail or wear away, the jaw coupling hub teeth will mate, much like teeth on two gears, and continue to transmit torque. This may or may not be desirable to the user depending on the application.

Jaw couplings elastomers are wearing elements that do need to be inspected and replaced. Jaw coupling elastomers often have signature wear patterns, and failures can often be root caused based on the condition of the elastomer and hubs. Common failure causes include misalignment, over-torque, chemical exposure, temperature exposure, torsional vibrations, and hub failure.

Jaw couplings are available in both straight tooth jaw and curved jaw design. The straight tooth design enables elastomers to be attached and removed radially, including a "not fail-safe" jaw elastomer in-shear design. For the elastomer in-shear design, the coupling hub teeth are no longer inter-meshed, so an elastomer failure will result in no torque being transmitted. When used with a stiff elastomer, the curved jaw design can maintain a zero-backlash fit required for many motion control applications.

Zero-backlash curved jaw couplings are best suited for applications that rely on a stop-and-go type of movement, where accuracy needs to take place upon stopping in order to perform any number of precision tasks, such as taking a high resolution picture (machine vision system). Absorbing vibrations decreases the settling time the system needs, which increases through-put. The curved jaw coupling is less suited for applications that rely on a constant scanning type of motion, where accuracy is required during movement, which requires a torsionally stronger coupling.

Like other flexible couplings, jaw couplings are limited in the shaft misalignment that they can accommodate. Too much axial motion will cause the couplings to come apart, while too much angular or parallel misalignment will result in bearing loads that may lead to premature system wear or failure.

With its damping capability, interchangeable spiders, and wide variety of custom options, jaw couplings make a great solution for shock absorption and torque transmission in many applications.

== See also ==
- Oldham coupler, a form of two-jawed jaw coupling where the centre spider is long, allowing the two halves to be displaced radially.
