= Hydraulic bicycle =

A hydraulic bicycle is a chainless bicycle that transfers power to the pedals by means of a liquid passing through tubes from hydraulic pump to hydraulic motor and back.

== Advantages ==
Advantages include:

- Shifting, through valves and displacement, provides either continuously variable gearing or more steps than traditional bicycles.
- Shifts smoothly under full power.
- Drive transmits power while pedaling forward and backward. Thus racers can power bicycle through turns by alternating short forward and backward pedal strokes. No slack or backlash occurs, in either direction. Ability to coast is maintained.
- Mechanism is clean and operates silently.
- Fewer moving parts (about 10 vs over 70), all of which are continuously bathed in clean lubricating fluid.
- Sealed systems require less maintenance than open chain system.
- Front-wheel drive and two-wheel drive systems can be implemented. (See two-wheel drive)
- Drive can double as a hydraulic brake, eliminating the weight, cost, and maintenance of regular brakes.
- The hydraulic (hydrostatic) transmission could be useful for recumbent bicycles because the hoses may be easier to route than a long chain.
- Energy recuperation, storage and power assist could be added.

== Disadvantages ==
Disadvantages include:

- Implementations to date are heavier than those of bicycle chain and sprocket designs.
- Though some of the components in a sealed hydraulic system maintain constant efficiency upwards of 95% in all conditions (see hydristor), the overall losses usually result in an efficiency of about 75% (power loss of about 25%, see hydraulic machinery). In contrast, a chain-and-sprocket system loses efficiency in bad weather and dirt – from 97% for clean new components down to less than 80% when worn and dirty.
- The system may leak fluid causing a mess and eventual failure.
