= Autobike =

Bicycle with automatic transmission

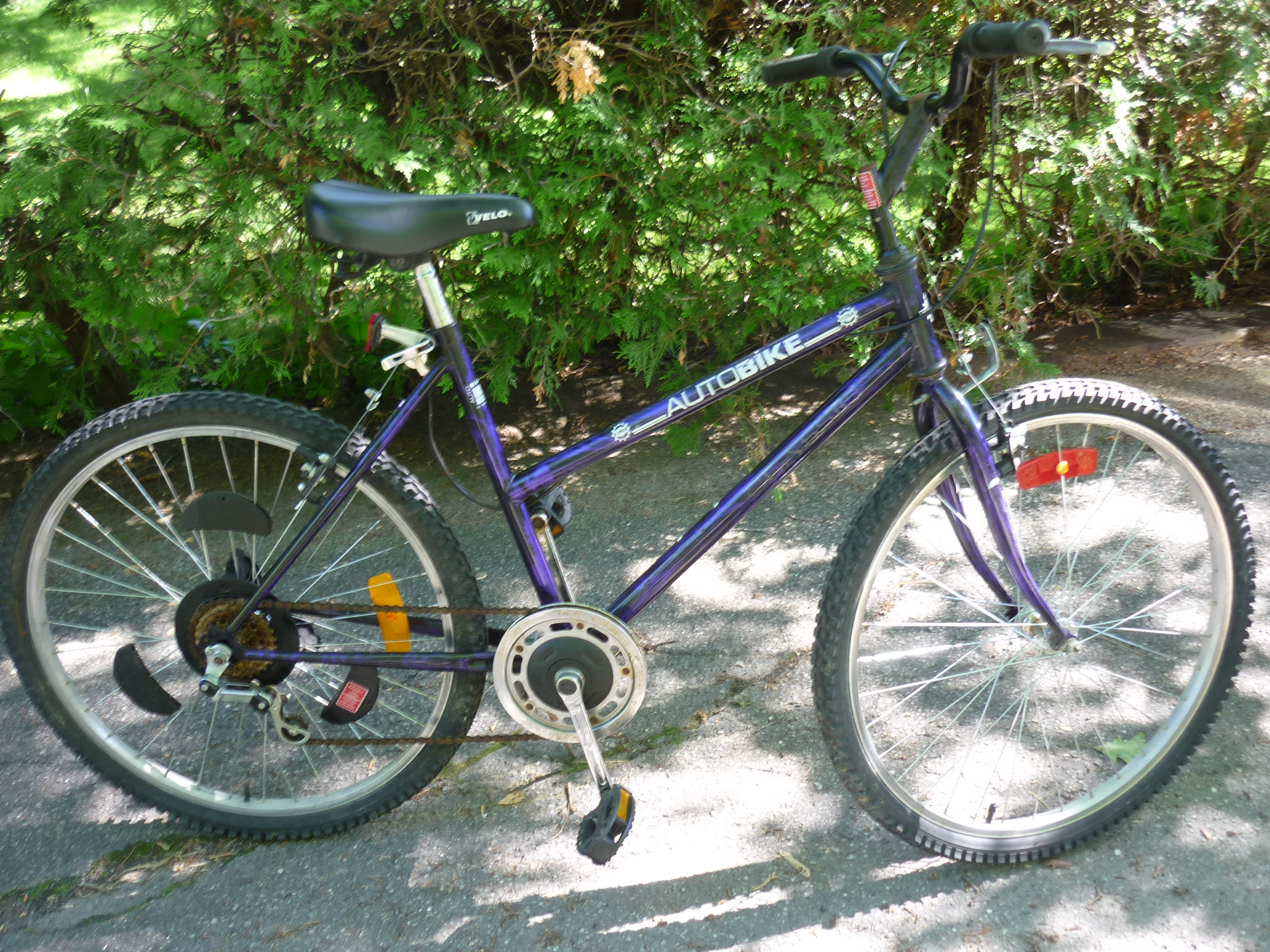
The original Autobike

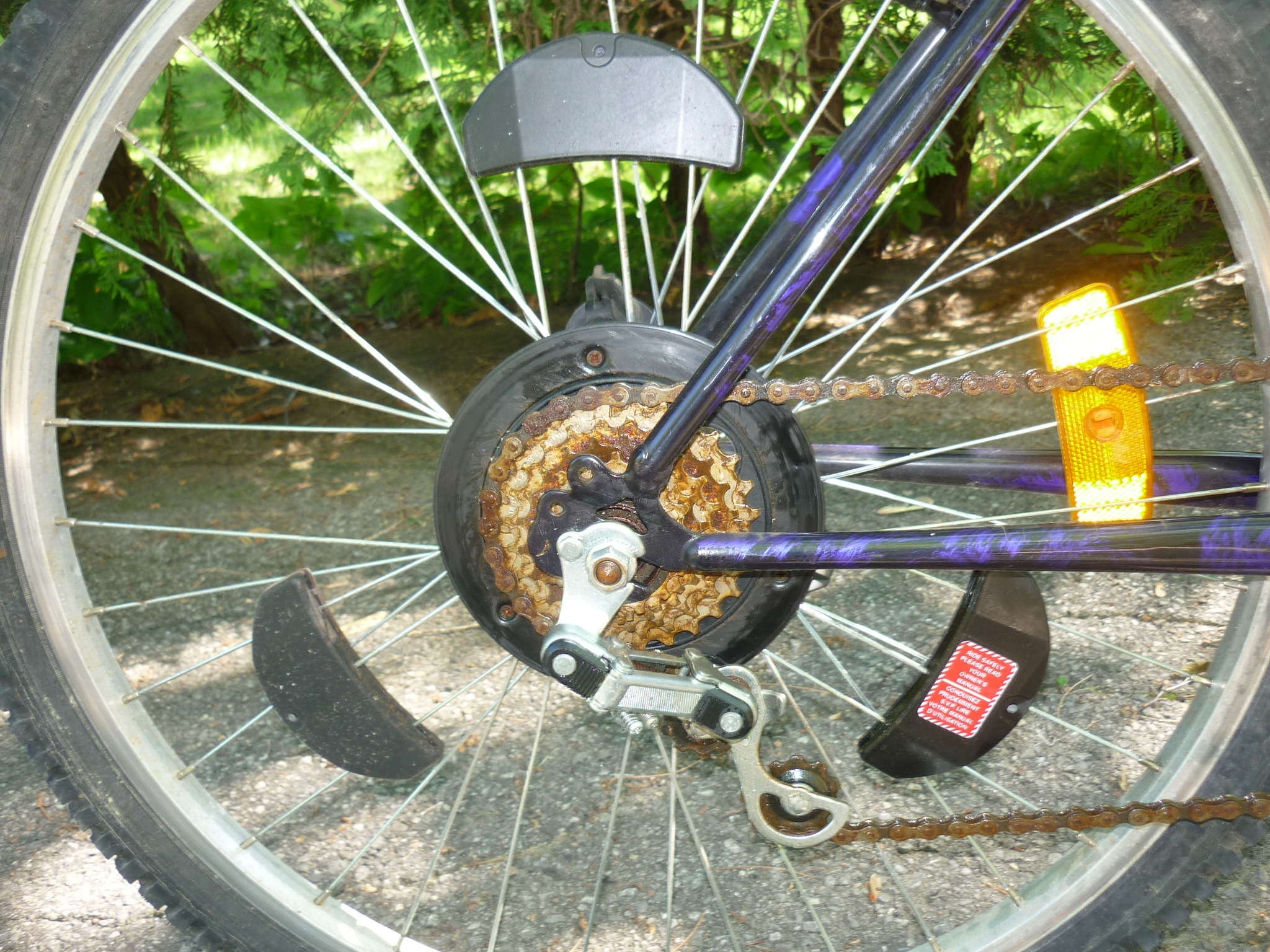
Gear system

An autobike or automatically geared bicycle is a bicycle with a derailleur or internally geared hub (transmission) that shifts gears without intervention from the rider.

== History ==
The CSA Autobike Classic was the first commercially sold autobike and was equipped with a system of centrifugal weights on the rear wheel with a rear derailleur attached to them. When the rider started pedaling it would cause the weights to spin outwards, which shifted the derailleur to a higher gear. When the rider stops pedaling and the bike comes to a stop, the weights would return to the center position, shifting the bike into its lowest gear so it is easier to get started again. The Autobike was featured on several infomercials in the latter half of the 1990s. CSA, the maker of the Autobike, eventually went bankrupt. Also of note was the Trek Lime from the 2000s. It used an internal 3-speed hub gear that was electrically shifted based on the rider's speed. Power was provided by a dynamo on the front hub. Current autobike designs of the 2020s build on the principles introduced by the Trek Lime. The front wheel uses a hub dynamo to generate electricity. Wires connect the dynamo through the frame to the bottom bracket area where it joins a small onboard computer with sensors that detect the rider's speed and cadence. The computer uses this information to actuate a motorized shifter mounted on the rear wheel's hub gear to change the gear ratio. The rear hub used is the Nuvinci N360 CVP which is a continuously variable transmission using a planetary gear system.

== See also ==
- Centrifugal governor
- Variomatic
