= Shaft-driven bicycle =

Type of bicycle which uses a drive shaft to transmit power instead of a chain

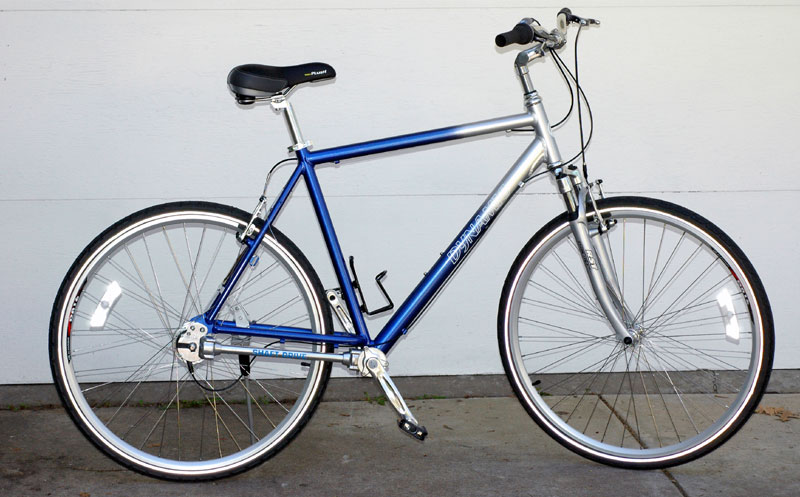
Dynamic Runabout 7 shaft-driven bicycle

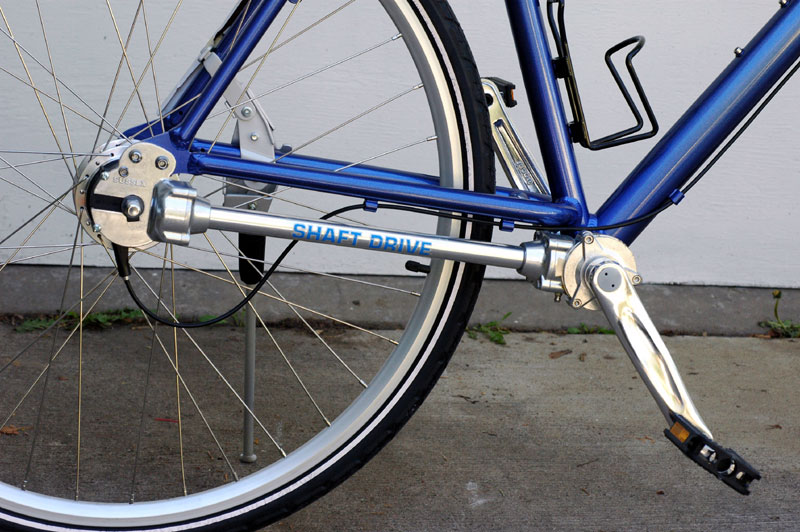
Drive-shaft housing

A shaft-driven bicycle is a bicycle that uses a drive shaft instead of a chain to transmit power from the pedals to the wheel. Shaft drives were introduced in the 1880s, but were mostly supplanted by chain-driven bicycles due to the gear ranges possible with sprockets and derailleurs. Around the 2000s, due to advancements in internal gear technology, a small number of modern shaft-driven bicycles have been introduced.

Shaft-driven bikes have a large bevel gear where a conventional bike would have its chain ring. This meshes with another bevel gear mounted on the drive shaft. The use of bevel gears allows the axis of the drive torque from the pedals to be turned through 90 degrees. The drive shaft then has another bevel gear near the rear wheel hub which meshes with a bevel gear on the hub where the rear sprocket would be on a conventional bike, and canceling out the first drive torque change of axis.

The 90-degree change of the drive plane that occurs at the bottom bracket and again at the rear hub uses bevel gears for the most efficient performance, though other mechanisms could be used, e.g. hobson's joints, worm gears or crossed helical gears.

The drive shaft is often mated to a hub gear which is an internal gear system housed inside the rear hub. Manufacturers of internal hubs suitable for use with shaft drive systems include NuVinci, Rohloff, Shimano, SRAM, and Sturmey-Archer.

== History ==
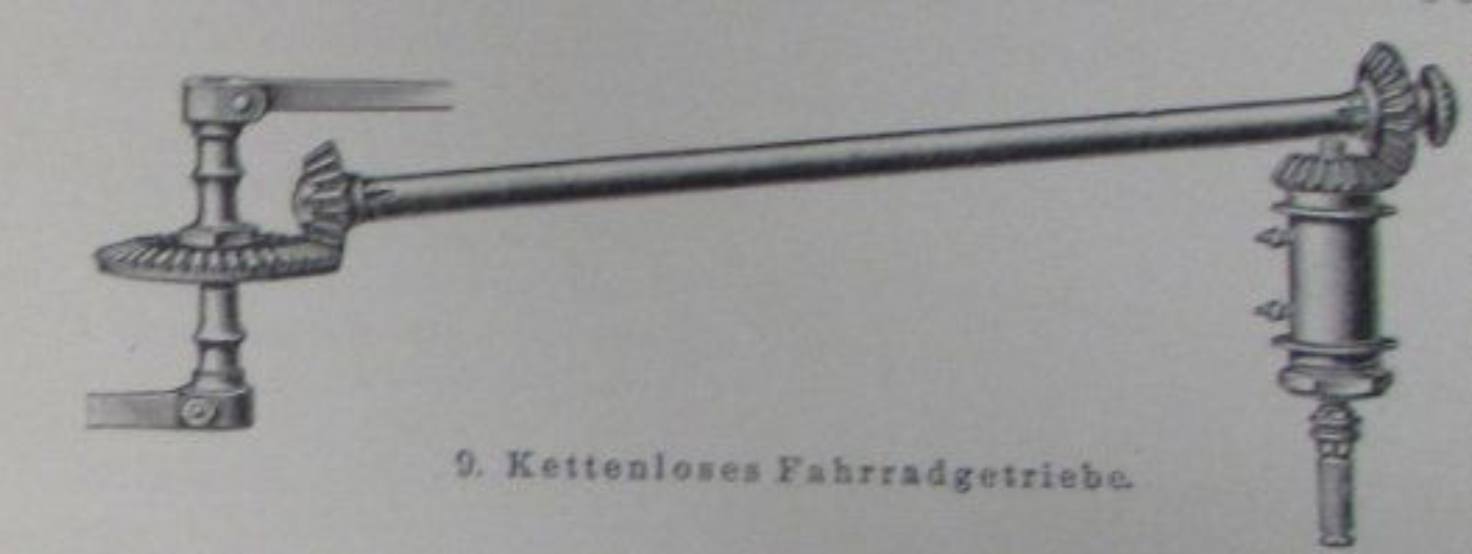
1880 lithography of a drive shaft

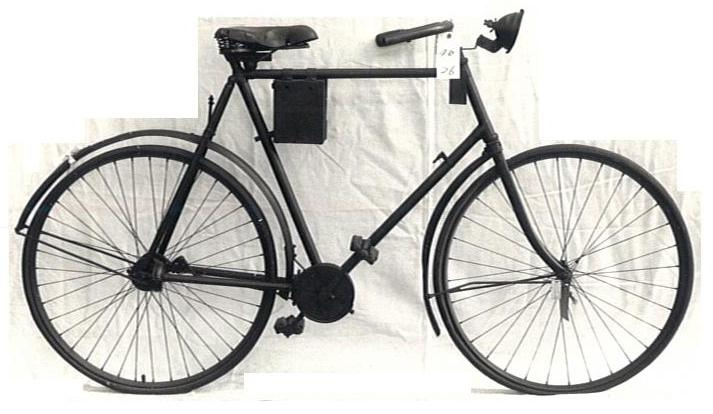
The Quadrant, an antique shaft-driven bicycle

The first shaft drives for cycles appear to have been invented independently in the United States and Britain. In 1880, the Orbicycle (which was actually a tricycle) by Thomas Moore powered by a shaft drive was sold in London, England. A. Fearnhead, of 354 Caledonian Road, North London, developed one in 1890 and received a patent in October 1891. His prototype shaft was enclosed within a tube running along the top of the chainstay; later models were enclosed within the actual chainstay. In the United States, Walter Stillman filed for a patent on a shaft-driven bicycle on Dec. 10, 1890, which was granted on July 21, 1891.

The shaft drive was not well accepted in Britain, so in 1894 Fearnhead took it to the United States where Colonel Pope of the Columbia firm bought the exclusive American rights. Belatedly, the British makers took it up, with Humber in particular plunging heavily on the deal. Victorian cycle engineer Professor Archibald Sharp was against shaft drive. In his 1896 book Bicycles and Tricycles, he wrote "The Fearnhead Gear ... if bevel-wheels could be accurately and cheaply cut by machinery, it is possible that gears of this description might supplant, to a great extent, the chain-drive gear; but the fact that the teeth of the bevel-wheels cannot be accurately milled is a serious obstacle to their practical success".

In the United States, they had been made by the League Cycle Company as early as 1893. Soon after, the French company Metropole marketed their Acatane. By 1897 Columbia began aggressively to market the chainless bicycle it had acquired from the League Cycle Company. Chainless bicycles were moderately popular in 1898 and 1899, although sales were still much smaller than regular bicycles, primarily due to the high cost. They were also somewhat less efficient than regular bicycles: there was roughly an 8 percent loss in the gearing, in part due to limited manufacturing technology at the time. The rear wheel was also more difficult to remove to change flats. Many of these deficiencies have been overcome in the past century.

In 1902, The Hill-Climber Bicycle Mfg. Company sold a three-speed shaft-driven bicycle in which the shifting was implemented with three sets of bevel gears. While a small number of chainless bicycles were available, for the most part, shaft-driven bicycles disappeared from view for most of the 20th century. There is, however, still a niche market for chainless bikes, especially for commuters, and there is a number of manufacturers who offer them either as part of a larger range or as a primary specialization. Notable examples are Biomega in Denmark and Brik in the Netherlands.

== Comparison of shaft vs chain ==
Shaft drives operate at a very consistent rate of efficiency and performance, without adjustments or maintenance, though their efficiency has been lower than that of a properly adjusted and lubricated chain, possibly because of insufficiently precise machining or alignment of the bevel gears. Shaft drives are typically more complex to disassemble when repairing flat rear tires, and the manufacturing cost is typically higher.

A fundamental issue with bicycle shaft-drive systems is the requirement to transmit the torque of the rider through bevel gears with much smaller radii than typical bicycle sprockets. This requires both high quality gears and heavier frame construction.

Since shaft-drives require gear hubs for shifting, they accrue all the benefits and drawbacks associated with such mechanisms.

Most of the advantages claimed for a shaft drive can be realized by using a fully enclosed chain case. Some of the other issues addressed by the shaft drive, such as protection for clothing and from ingress of dirt, can be met through the use of chain guards. The reduced need for adjustment in shaft-drive bikes also applies to a similar extent to chain or belt-driven hub-geared bikes. Not all hub gear systems are shaft compatible.

== Gallery ==
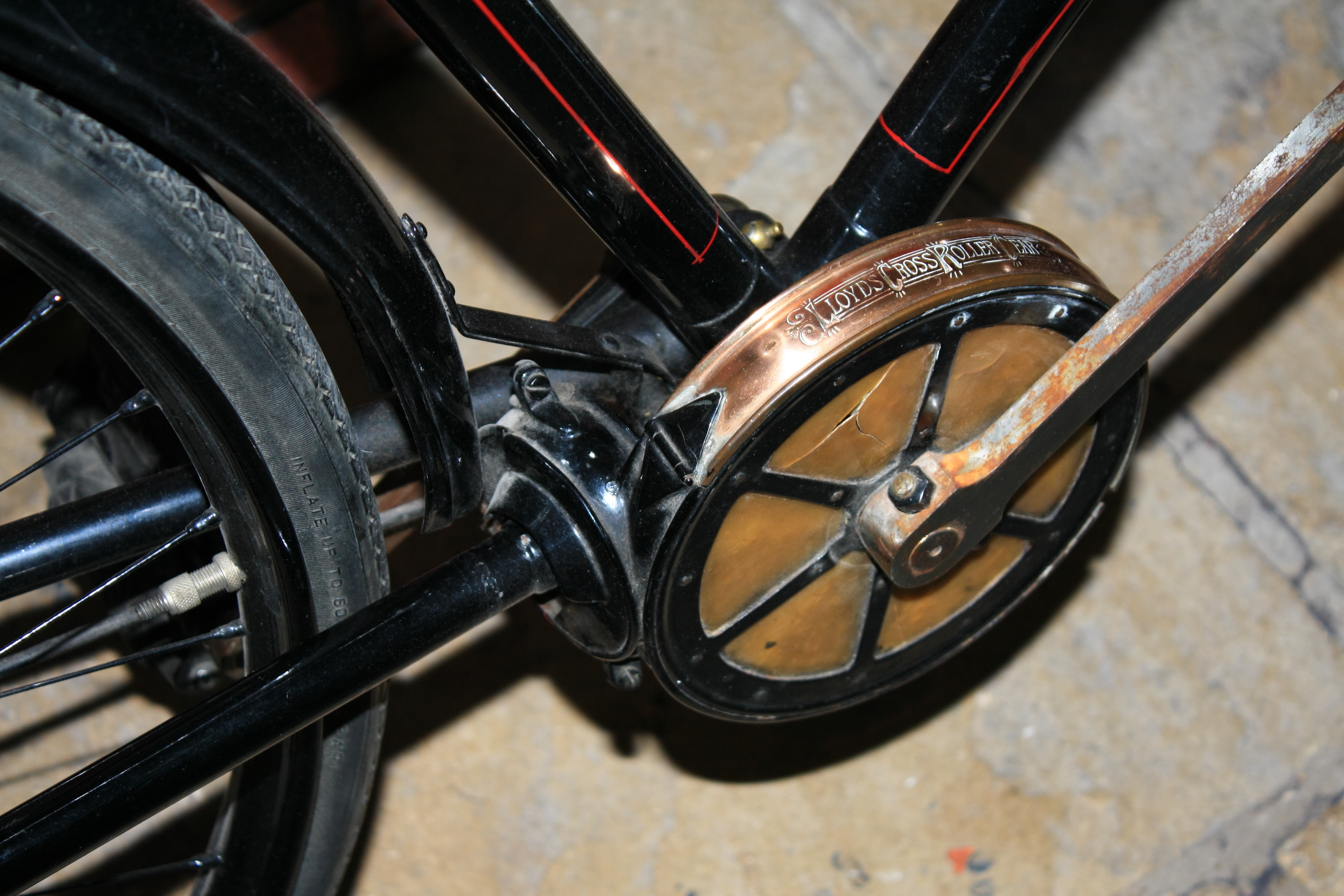
Lloyds Cross Roller Gear in the Coventry Transport Museum

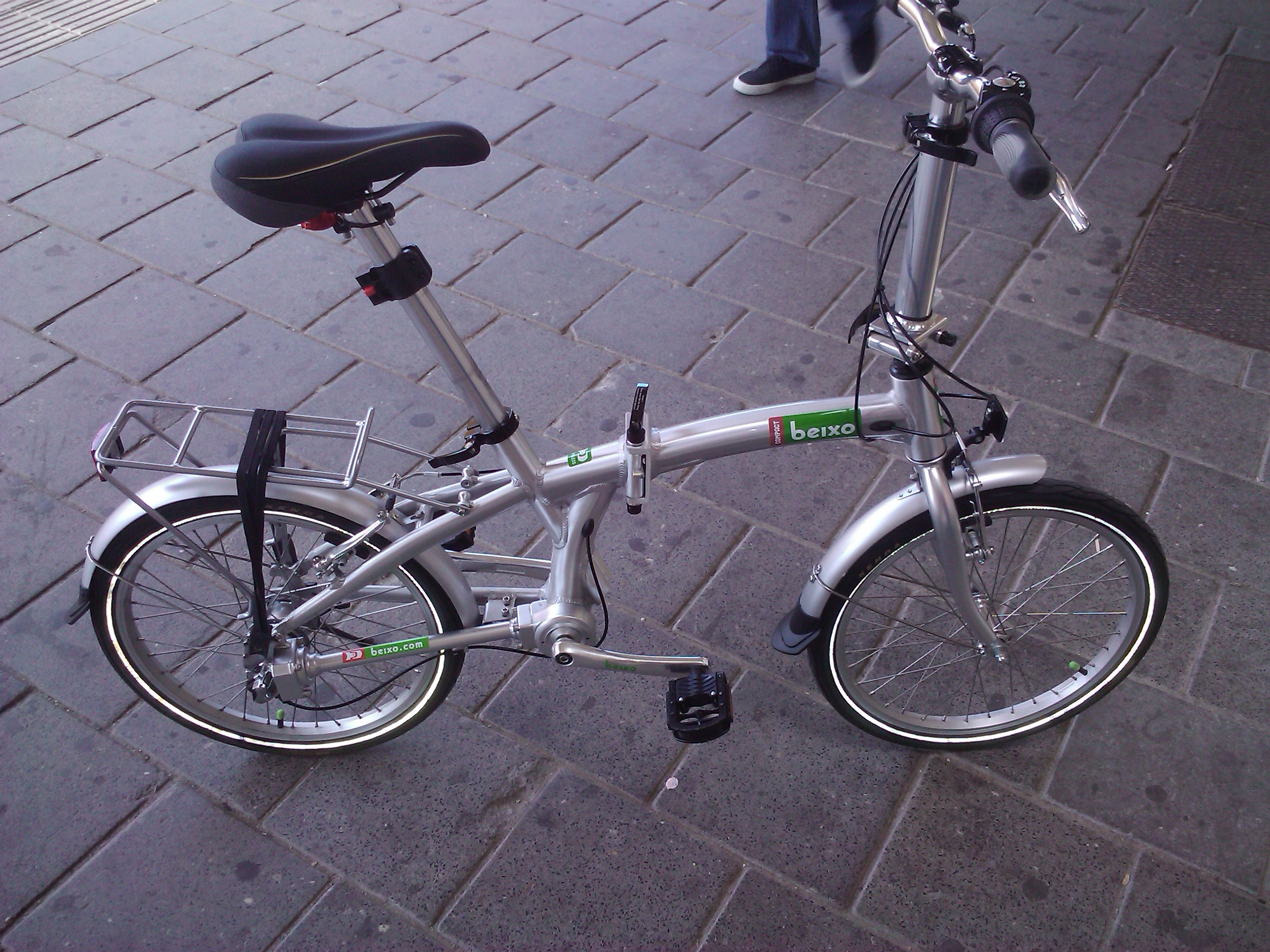
Shaft-driven folding bicycle

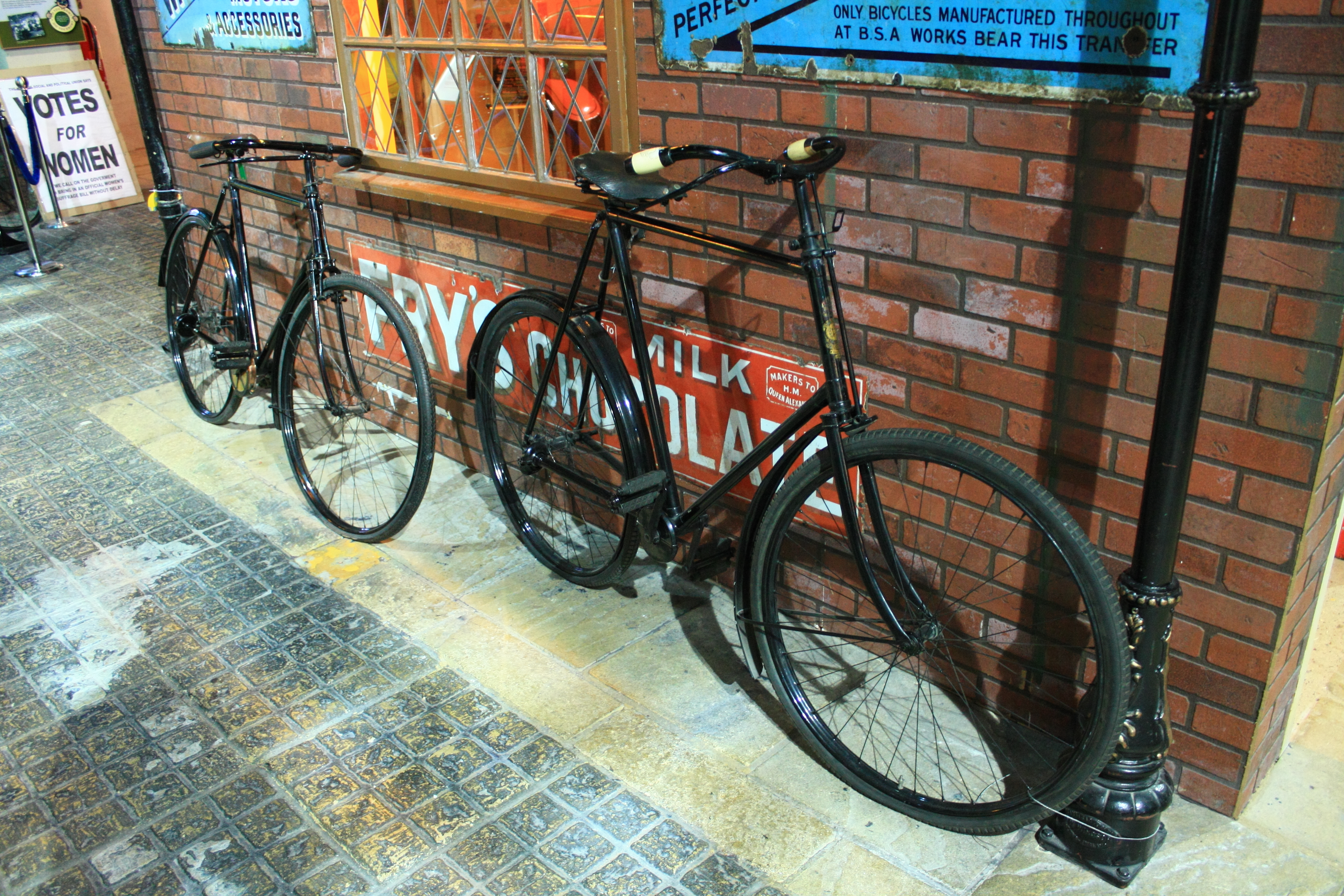
Shaft driven roadsters in the Coventry Transport Museum, UK.

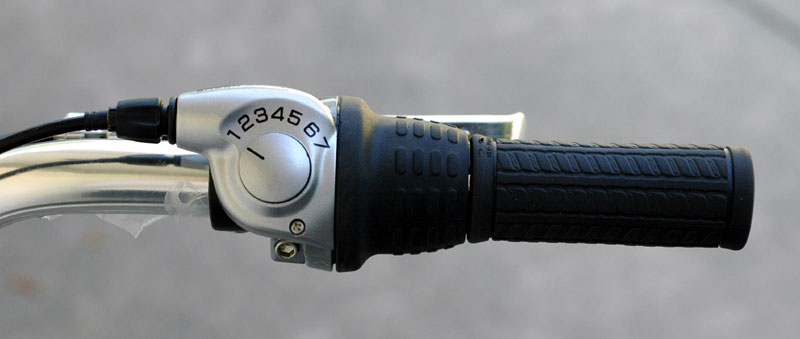
Right-hand shift lever

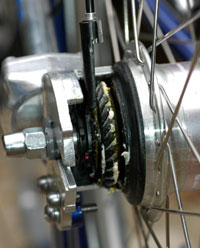
Bevel ring gear on the rear wheel of a shaft-drive bicycle

== See also ==
- Chainless bicycle
- Outline of cycling
- Velovision - magazine regularly reviews shaft-drive bikes
