= Stringbike =

Bicycle drive train using ropes and pulleys

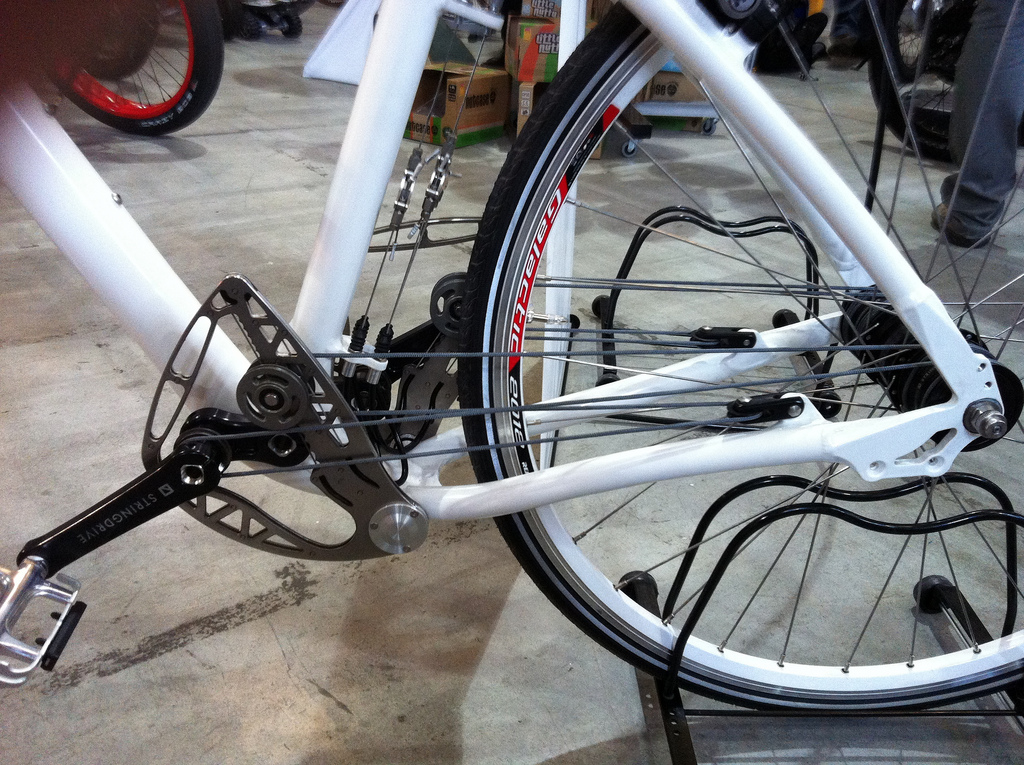
Stringbike mechanism

A string-driven bicycle or stringbike is a bicycle that uses an external chainless rope and pulley drive system instead of a traditional bicycle chain and sprockets. The mechanism was commercialized by Hungarian Stringbike Kft which presented models in 2010 with a 19-speed system with no duplicate gears and having a 350% gear range.

== Design ==
The mechanism has a rocker arm on each side of the bike that replaces the round sprockets (which are usually only on the right side) on chain driven bikes. In contrast to traditional derailleur chain drives, the drive does not slip when changing gears, and the gearing can be changed even when the bicycle is almost stationary. (similarly to a hub gear), but also "at full throttle." Two Dyneema ropes (ultra-high-molecular-weight polyethylene, UHMWPE) attached to pulleys attached to swinging lever and cam mechanisms have been used, one on each side of the bike.

== History ==
In the 1990s, string-driven bicycles were developed by Mihály Lantos and others.

In the 2010s, the concept was commercialized by Hungarian Schwinn Csepel Zrt. and Stringbike Kft. Patents were filed by Stringdrive Technologies Kft for Robert Kohlheb and Mihaly Lantos in 2010 alternating drive elements for bikes (8602433 and 20110266768), and in 2011 on flexible pulley-drives for bikes (9162525).

In 2010, the world's first commercial string-driven bicycle was presented in Padova, Italy by the manufacturing company Stringbike Kft. The company has produced and sold stringbikes with aluminium frames and carbon frames under the brand Stringbike.

In 2012 it was announced that the Hungarian rider Ferenc Szőnyi would use the model Stringbike E line RAAM with a carbon frame in Race Across America, where he placed 14th overall.
