= Comparison of hub gears =

This page is a list of internal hub gears for bicycles.

Brand	Model	Introduced	Discontinued	Speeds (external)	Gear width (with external)	Ebike Max Power	Max Torque	Direct Drive	Weight (excluding auxiliary components)	Intended purpose
Bafang	RG A510.S.D	2023		5	315.7%				3700g	eFat
Bafang	RG A310.S.D	2022		3	165.1%		80 Nm		1700g	eCity / eTour
3x3	Nine	2022		9	554%		250 Nm		2000g	eMTB, heavy cargo, commuter
Brompton	BSR (fork from Sturmey Archer)			3	178%				? g	City
Brompton	BWR	2009		3(x2)	246% (302%)				940 g	City
Enviolo	City	2019		continuous	310%	250 W	55 Nm	n/a	2450 g	City
Enviolo	Trekking	2019		continuous	380%	250 W	85 Nm	n/a	2450 g	City/Trekking
Enviolo	Sportive	2019		continuous	380%	500 W	120 Nm	n/a	?	City/Trekking/Sport
Enviolo	Cargo	2019		continuous	380%	500 W	80 Nm	n/a	?	City/Cargo
Enviolo	Commercial	2019		continuous	310%	250 W	50 Nm	n/a	?	City
Fallbrook (Enviolo)	NuVinci N380	2015	2018	continuous	380%			n/a	2450 g	City
Fallbrook (Enviolo)	NuVinci N360	2010	2014	continuous	360%			n/a	2450 g	City
Fallbrook (Enviolo)	Nuvinci N330	2015	2018	continuous	330%			n/a	2450 g	City
Fallbrook (Enviolo)	NuVinci N171	2007	2010	continuous	350%			n/a	3850–3950 g	City
Kindernay	XIV	2016		14	543%		160 Nm		1400g raw cartridge	eMTB, heavy cargo, commuter
Kindernay	VII	2021		7	428%		160 Nm		1200g raw cartridge, 1750g total system weight including SWAP and Hyseq Onesie	eMTB, heavy cargo, commuter
Rohloff AG	Speedhub 500/14	1998		14	526%		130 Nm	11th gear	1700-1825 g	Sport/Touring/ Cargo/Tandem
Shimano	Alfine Di2 SG-S7001-11 (SG-S7051-11)	2018		11	409%			~5th gear (0.995 ratio)	1665 g	City, Sport, Touring
Shimano	Alfine SG-S7000-8 (SG-S7001-8)	2014 (2017)		8	307%			5th gear	1680 g	City
Shimano	Alfine SG-700	2010	2017	11	409%			n/a	1600-1744 g	City, Sport
Shimano	Alfine SG-500	2006	2016 (?)	8	307%				1600 g	City
Shimano	Nexus Inter-8			8	307%			5th gear	1550-2040 g	City
Shimano	Nexus Inter-7	1995		7	244%				1465-1860 g	City
Shimano	Nexus Inter-5E	2019		5	263%		60 Nm	1st gear	1650 g	e-bike
Shimano	Nexus 4 Speed			4	184%			1st gear		City
Shimano	Nexus Inter-3			3	187%			2nd gear	1220 g	City
SRAM (Sachs)	Spectro E12 (Elan)	1995	1999	12	339%				3500-4000 g	City
SRAM	i-Motion 9	2005	2012	9	340%				2000g (w/o brake)- 2400g (with coaster brake)	City
SRAM	G8	2012	2015	8	260%				2088-2180 g	City
SRAM	G9	2014	2015	9	292%				2088 g	City, Sport
SRAM (Sachs)	Spectro S7 (Super 7)	1993	2010	7	303% (Super 7: 284%)			4th gear	1645-1826 g	City
SRAM (Sachs)	Spectro P5 (Pentasport), P5 Cargo	1987	2010?	5	224-251%			3rd gear		City
SRAM (Sachs)	Spectro T3/i-Motion 3/Torpedo Dreigang	1970s	2017	3	187%			2nd gear		City
SRAM (Sachs)	Neos/Spectro 3x7	1994	2000	3(x7)	186% (434%)					City
SRAM (Sachs)	Torpedo Duomatic/Automatic		2017	2	136%					City
Sturmey Archer	XRF-8 (W), XRK-8 (W), XRD-8 (W)	2014		8	325%			1st Gear	1770-2170 g	City/Folding
Sturmey Archer	XRF-8, X-R[F/D/K]8	2007	2013	8	305%			1st Gear	1480-1600 g	City
Sturmey Archer	RX-RF5, RX-RD5, RX-RK5, RX-RC5, RXL-RD5, TS-RF5	2017		5	243%			3rd Gear	1905-2412 g	City
Sturmey Archer	S5, AT5, SAB, Sprinter-5,[S/X/XL]-R[C/D/F/K]5	1966		5	225-256%				1200-1760 g	City
Sturmey Archer	X-RF4, X-RK4, X-RD4	2018		4	210%			1st Gear	1160-1630 g	City/Folding
Sturmey Archer	F[C/M/G/W]	1935	1970	4	134-160%				? g	City
Sturmey Archer	A[BC/T3], AW[C], S[C3/SAB], [S/X/XL]-R[F/S/F]3, SEARS 503.21	1933		3	178%			2nd Gear	1000-1380 g	City
Sturmey Archer	[S/B]2[C] Duomatic	2010		2	138%				930-1400 g	City
