= Rohloff (surname) =

Rohloff is a surname. Notable people with the surname include:

- Bernhard Rohloff (1950–2023), German businessman
- Jon Rohloff (born 1969), American ice hockey player
- Ken Rohloff (born 1939), American basketball player
- Semon Rohloff (born 1970), Australian swimmer
- Steingrimur Rohloff (born 1971), German composer
- Todd Rohloff (born 1974), American ice hockey player

== See also ==
- Roloff
- Rolon (disambiguation)
