= Bernhard Rohloff =

German businessman (1950–2023)

Bernhard Felix Rohloff (21 February 1950 – 19 May 2023) was a German businessman who was the founder of Rohloff AG, and the inventor of several innovative products, amongst others, the 14 speed Rohloff Speedhub 500/14 planetary gear hub.

Rohloff studied machine engineering at Olympia while working part-time at Henschel und Thyssen, a German locomotive manufacturer. After graduation, he worked at Mercedes-Benz with the development of automobile driveshafts.

== Rohloff AG ==
Later he struck out on his own and founded Rohloff AG, where he first invented an advanced narrow chain that soon became the industry standard for road-bikes and was used by several Tour de France winners, and the manufacturing methods therefore. He personally designed "the green beast", a proprietary machine for manufacturing SLT-99 chains. Rohloff AG became an OEM chain manufacturer for Campagnolo.

== Rohloff Speedhub 500/14 ==
In the early 90s, Rohloff began the development of the Rohloff Speedhub 500/14, which was subsequently patented and released into the market in 1998. It is the only gear hub on the market (together with the new 14-speed Kindernay XIV) with more than 11 speeds. The gear hub is manufactured and assembled by hand in the company's premises in Hessen, Germany.

== Death ==
Rohloff died from complications of Parkinson's disease on 19 May 2023, at the age of 73.
