= Roloff =

Roloff is both a surname and a given name. Notable people with the name include:

== Surname ==
- Carola Roloff (b. 1959), German Buddhist nun
- Helmut Roloff (1912–2001), German pianist and teacher
- Julio Roloff (b. 1951), Cuban composer
- Lester Roloff (1914–1982), American fundamentalist Independent Baptist minister
- Matthew Roloff (b. 1961), American author, farmer, and businessman
- Roloff family in the reality series Little People, Big World, featuring Matthew, Amy, Jeremy, Zach, Molly, and Jacob

== Given name ==
- Roloff Beny (1924–1984), Canadian photographer

== See also ==
- Rohloff, a manufacturer of bicycle components
- Rohloff (surname)
