= SRAM i-Motion =

The SRAM i-Motion series of products is a sport, urban, and trekking oriented product series developed and manufactured by SRAM Corporation. Branded i-Motion are internally geared hubs, shift levers, and dynamo hubs. Related to the i-Motion series are also changeable free or fixed single speed hubs, hybrid epicyclic and derailleur gear hubs, and hydraulic disc brakes. The i-Motion series of products were developed at SRAMs Schweinfurt R&D and manufacturing plant in Germany, formerly of Sachs.

== Products ==
i-Motion 9 - This hub gear has nine speeds in percentage increments of 14,17,17...17,14, offering an overall range of 340%. The coaster-brake version weighs 2400 grams, while the non-brake integrated versions weigh just under 2000 grams. This product was discontinued in 2012, and replaced with the SRAM G8.

i-Motion 3 - The 3 has similar gear ratios as the Shimano Nexus three speed hubs, 36% intervals and an overall range of 186%.

Feb 17 2017 SRAM announced End of Life on i-Motion 3 Hubs: https://www.bicycleretailer.com/international/2017/02/15/sram-ends-sales-internal-gear-hubs#.X2Z27pNKh0s

Feb 25 2019 SRAM announced a recall on i-3 Motion hubs (coaster brake version) due to braking issues: https://www.bicycling.com/news/a26521411/sram-recall-internal-gear-hubs/#:~:text=The%20company's%20i%2DMotion%203,resulting%20in%20a%20minor%20injury.
