= SRAM G8 =

SRAM G8 is an internally geared hub for bicycles developed and manufactured by the American cycling component manufacturer SRAM Corporation. It entered production in 2013.

== Development ==
Development of the product started in 2011, as a reaction to the Japanese corporation Shimano's introducing a competing product Alfine S700. The G8 was intended to replace the 9-speed SRAM i-Motion 9, which had been manufactured in SRAM's facility in Schweinfurt, Germany since 2005. In 2010, SRAM announced its new strategy to close down the factory in Schweinfurt, which had roots back to 1895. Allegedly, the facility continued to operate as an R&D- and service-center, although all manufacturing there ceased. In August 2012, SRAM announced its first product resulting from the new strategy, the G8. In 2013, after just 22 months of development, SRAM announced that manufacturing was to commence at the new facility in Dali, Taiwan. The G8 is lighter in weight than the i-Motion 9, and the internal mechanism is much less complicated.

== Features ==
- 8 speeds, 259,7% overall range
- Even gear ratio increments (ratio range 0.609-1.581)
- Weight 2188 grams
- Coaster brake
- Disc Brake
- Freewheel
- 36 spokes
