= Rohloff Speedhub =

Internal hub gear for bicycles

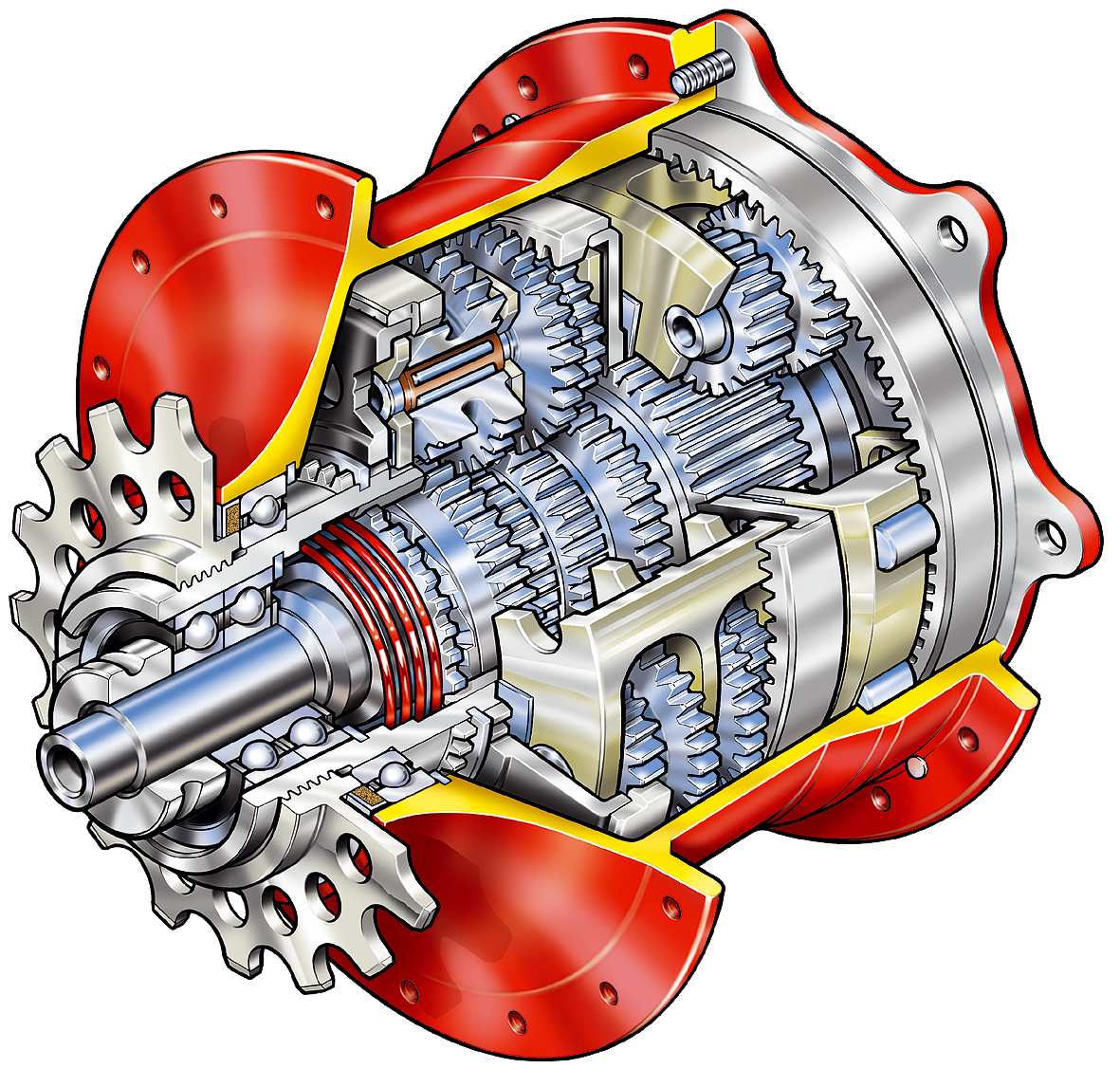
Internal schematic of a Rohloff Speedhub 500/14

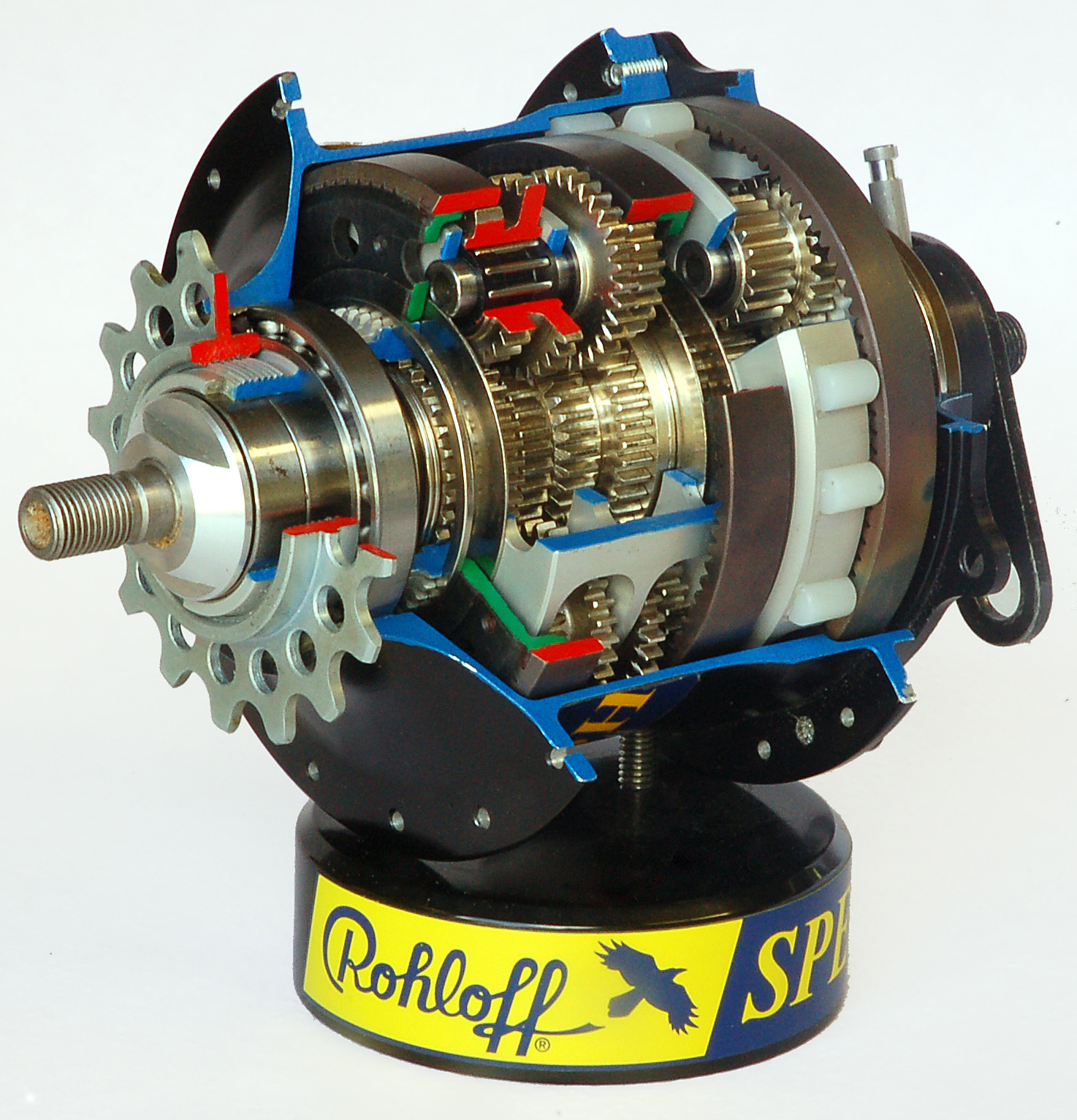
Internal picture of a Rohloff Speedhub 500/14

Assembling of the hub

The Rohloff Speedhub is an epicyclic internal hub gear for bicycles, developed and patented by Rohloff AG. It has been manufactured and marketed by that company since 1998. The Speedhub 500/14 has 14 equally spaced, sequential, non-overlapping gear ratios operated by a single twistgrip. The overall gear range is 526%, meaning the highest gear is 5.26 times as high as the lowest gear. Individual gear shifts when shifting up give an increase of about 13.6% (equivalent to a decrease of about 12.0% when shifting down).

The Speedhub is more expensive than competing bicycle gear systems (both hub gears and derailleur gears), and it is more than 450 grams heavier than a comparable set of derailleur gears, but offers about the same gear range (and at its ratio of 5.26:1 more range than a typical road bike ratio of 4.28:1 with 50/34 chainrings and 11 to 32 tooth cassette) while requiring significantly less maintenance and having a longer service life. It is therefore mainly used in expensive touring bicycles and in mountain bikes, where its lack of (vulnerable) external components is useful.

== Versions ==
There are different options available for the Speedhub to cater for different kinds of bicycle frames and applications that the bicycle it is to be fitted to might be used in.

- OEM (original equipment manufacturer), or
- OEM2 (for frames with the IS 2000 international standard disc brake mount).

Either of the above comes with the following three options:

- DB (Disc Brake)
- EX (external gear mechanism)
- T (Tandem) option which could be any of the above but comes with longer cables.

There also two types of axle available:

- the solid TS (Touring Axle), and
- the lighter, hollow CC (Cross Country) axle: the CC can be used with quick release levers.

As of 2014, the Speedhub is available in three colours: silver, red or black.

Finally, the Speedhub is available with either 32 or 36 spoke holes.

The above options are combined so a particular unit could be a Speedhub "CC DB OEM2 silver, 32 spoke holes" or a Speedhub "TS EX OEM black, 36 spoke holes" for example.

== Technical ==
=== Operation ===
The internal construction of the gear hub consists of three planetary gear series, connected one after the other, selectively engaged depending on the user's gear choice, each containing a stepped planet. The first two gear series provide seven ratios, and the third a complete range reduction, doubling the number of speeds to fourteen. The first two stepped series are identical and mirrored, each offering two ratios and direct drive. Each planet level meshes with a sun gear (each of which can be either stationary or free to rotate), and each smaller planet meshes with an annulus (one being input, the other being output). Shifting is achieved by locking a certain combination of suns, using pawls, and engaging or releasing each of the two clutches. The first planetary series gears three and two steps down respectively, while the second gears two and three steps up respectively, both also having direct drive when the respective clutch is engaged with the suns free to spin. One step down is achieved by combining three steps down with two steps up, and one step up by combining two steps down with three steps up. Thus three different steps down, direct drive and three different steps up are achieved by a double planet system, all in even increments due to the cog sizes selected. The reduction gear is a standard unit known from the art.

All planet gears of the first 2 planetary systems are on the same carrier (4 gears on each axle, with each set of 2 locked to the same shaft, i.e. 2 shafts rotating on a common axle). The common planet carrier is the means to transfer power between planetary system one and two. Input is applied to the first ring gear. Either sun gear 1 or 2 must be locked to serve as reactionary member (but never both). With the planet carrier the output of the first system, the result is speed reduction. With the planet carrier the input of the second system and its ring gear (ring gear 2 of the mechanism) the output, the result is speed increase. Because a system consists of two suns of different size, two ratios each for reduction and increase are selectable. The second ring gear of the mechanism is directly bolted to the final sun gear of the reduction stage. When the final stage's ring gear is held stationary, the result is speed reduction at the planet carrier output. With planet carrier and ring gear of the final reduction stage locked (and the final ring gear free to spin), it gives direct drive and a reduction ratio of 1:1.

Clutch #2 cannot be engaged. It is simply an overrun clutch that will be locked and transmit power when suns #3 and #4 are disengaged from the center axle and will overrun when one of the sun gears is locked and power is transmitted to the ring gear by the planets. In other words, ring gear 2 can either rotate at the same speed as the shared planet carrier or at a higher speed.

Clutch #3 couples the reduction stage sun gear to its ring carrier (direct drive), clutch #4 locks the reduction stage ring gear to the stationary axle. Freewheeling is achieved by allowing ring gear 3 to freewheel in a forward direction. It will thus either freewheel relative to the axle when final reduction is enabled, or to the sun gear when final reduction is in direct drive. In other words, when the final reduction stage is in direct drive, the freewheeling contribution will put the planetary system into reverse overdrive with the planet carrier now the input and the ring gear the output that has no load.

The IGR (inner gear ratio), hub revolutions per sprocket revolution of the Speedhub, lies between 0.279 and 1.467 depending on the gear chosen. Gear 11 has a ratio of 1.0. The Speedhub has a 526% range between the highest and lowest gear. The range of gears in detail is:

Gear	IGR	Sun #1	Sun #2	Clutch #1	Ratio 1	Sun #3	Sun #4	Clutch #2	Ratio 2
1	0.279	stationary			0.682			engaged	1
2	0.316		stationary		0.774			engaged	1
3	0.360	stationary			0.682	stationary			1.292
4	0.409			engaged	1			engaged	1
5	0.464		stationary		0.774		stationary		1.467
6	0.528			engaged	1	stationary			1.292
7	0.600			engaged	1		stationary		1.467
8	0.682								
9	0.774								
10	0.881								
11	1.000								
12	1.135								
13	1.292								
14	1.467								

The overall average loss of the gears is about 1%–5%, comparable to a derailleur.

=== Mounting ===
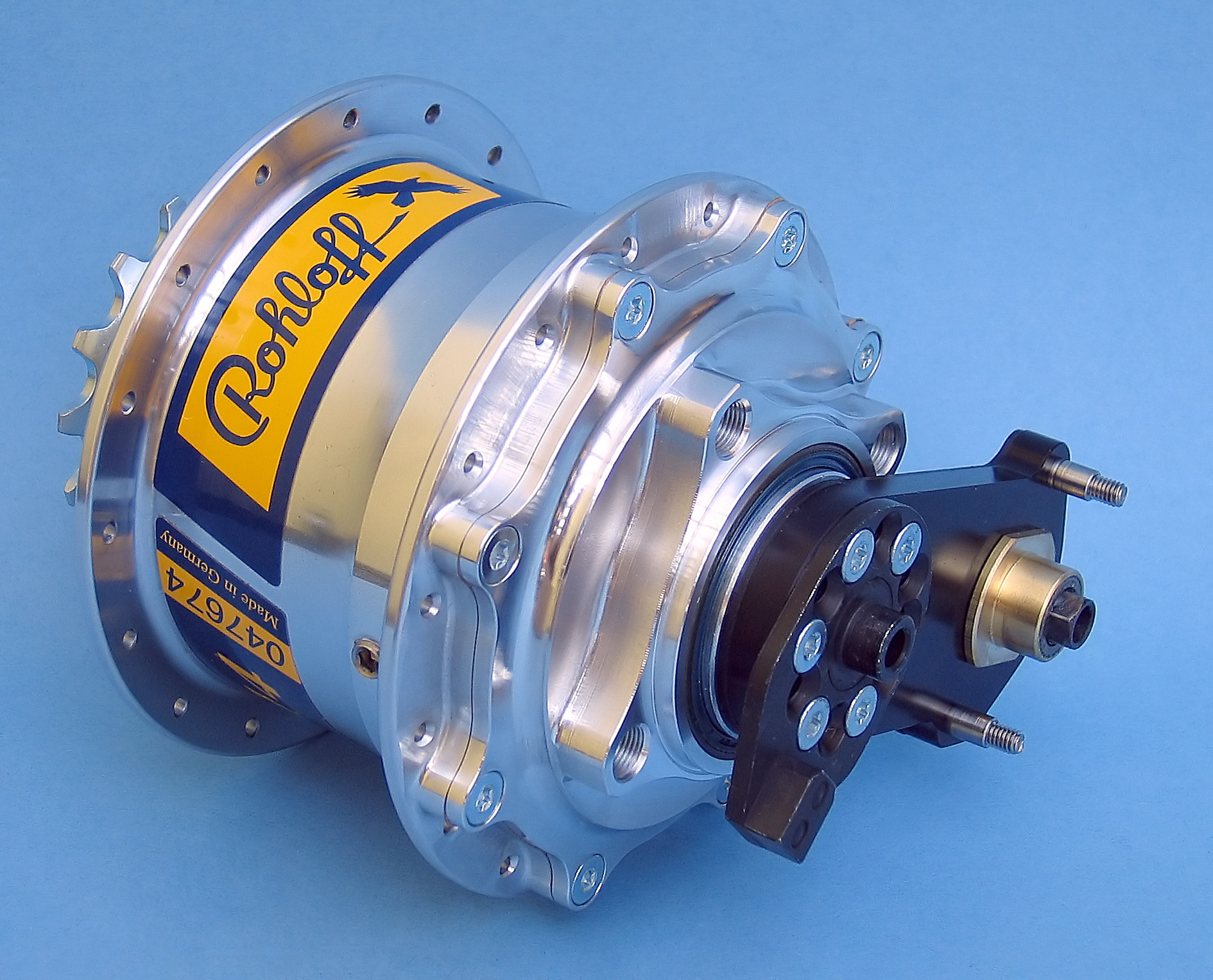
Detail view of the hub

The Speedhub is provided with a twist shifter for shift operation, with one cable pulling in each direction. The indexing mechanism is part of the hub.

As with all hub gears, there is a torque reaction that must be countered if the internals are not to rotate, and this is routed to the bicycle's frame by means of specially designed wheel dropout slots (OEM versions), or a torque bar bolted to the frame (EX) or the disc brake mount (DB).

The hub contains 25 ml of oil which should be replaced once a year or after 5,000 km (manufacturer advice). Overfilling can lead to leaks, as can laying the hub/cycle on its side in some low-pressure aircraft holds.

The sprocket on the hub is made for standard-pitch derailleur-type bicycle chains 1/2 by 3/32 inch (12.7 mm × 2.4 mm) (ISO 082) and is offered with different numbers of teeth, like 13/15/16/17. The 15-, 16-, and 17-tooth sprockets are reversible, offering double sprocket life once the sprocket is worn out in one direction. The 13-tooth sprocket is non-reversible and has a 4 mm outward offset, changing the chain-line from 54 to 58 mm, this because the smaller sprocket makes the chain run closer to the axle, and the chain would rub the hub shell if the sprocket were not offset.

== Technical data ==
Frame spacing:	135 mm (5.315 in)
Spoke hole circle diameter:	100 mm (3.937 in)
Number of spokes:	32 or 36
Axle diameter at dropout:	9.8 mm (0.386 in)
Oil amount:	25 ml (0.85 US fl oz; 0.88 imp fl oz)
Sprocket thread:	M34 x 6 P6
Chain line:	54 mm (2.126 in) (58 mm or 2.283 in with 13-tooth sprocket)
Twist shifter angle per gear:	21°
Shifter cable movement per gear:	7.4 mm (0.291 in)
Weight:	1,820 g (64.2 oz)
Price:	above €900

== In use ==
=== Break-in period ===
Rohloff hubs generally require a break-in period to function optimally. The manufacturer suggests this may require 500–1,000 miles (805–1,610 km) of active riding. For some riders the break-in period may be longer. Until the hub is broken in the rider may experience some noise or vibrations when the reduction-gear is in operation (gears 1–7).

== Gallery ==
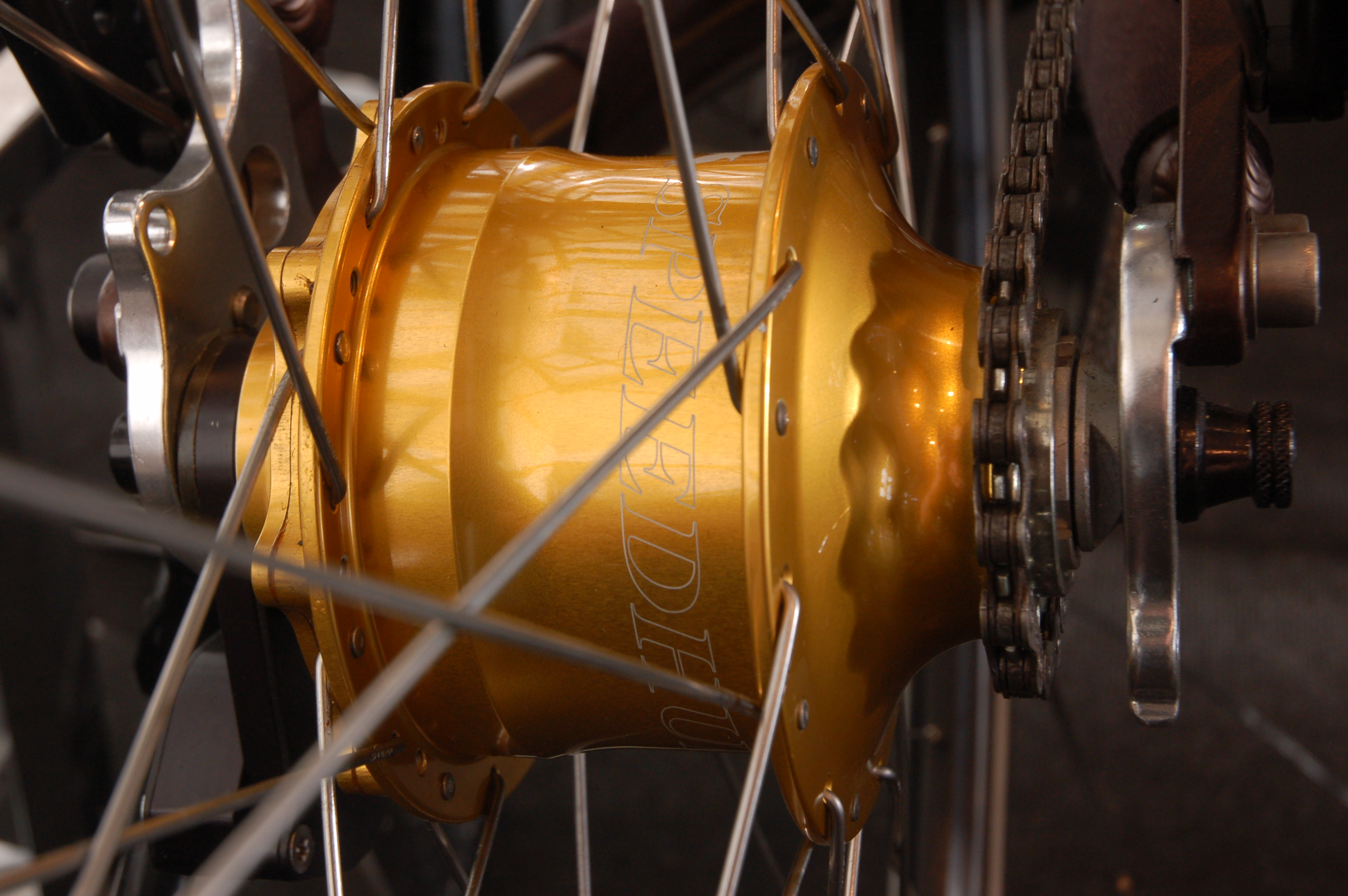
Special model gold anodised.

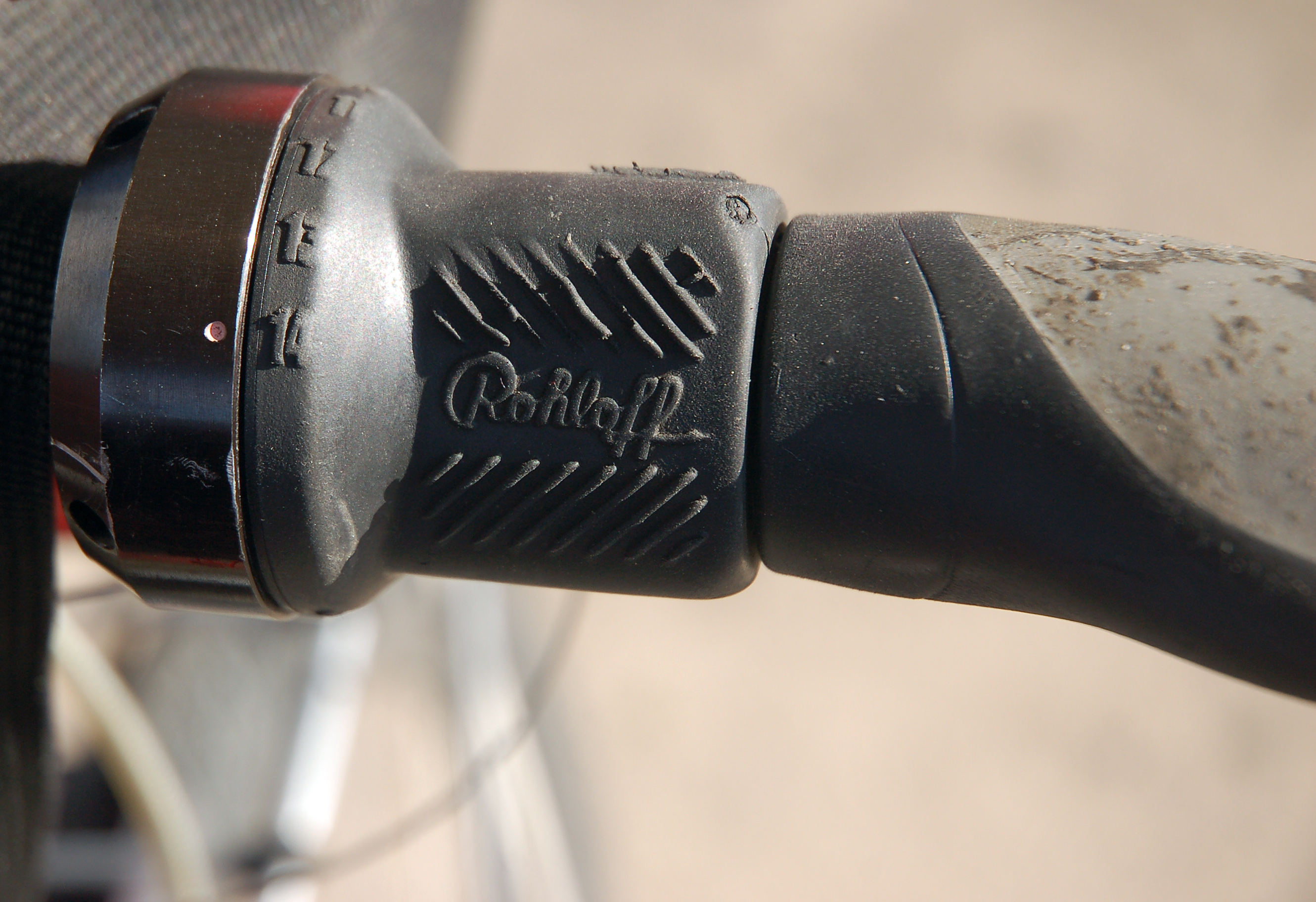
Former standard twist shifter for Speedhub.

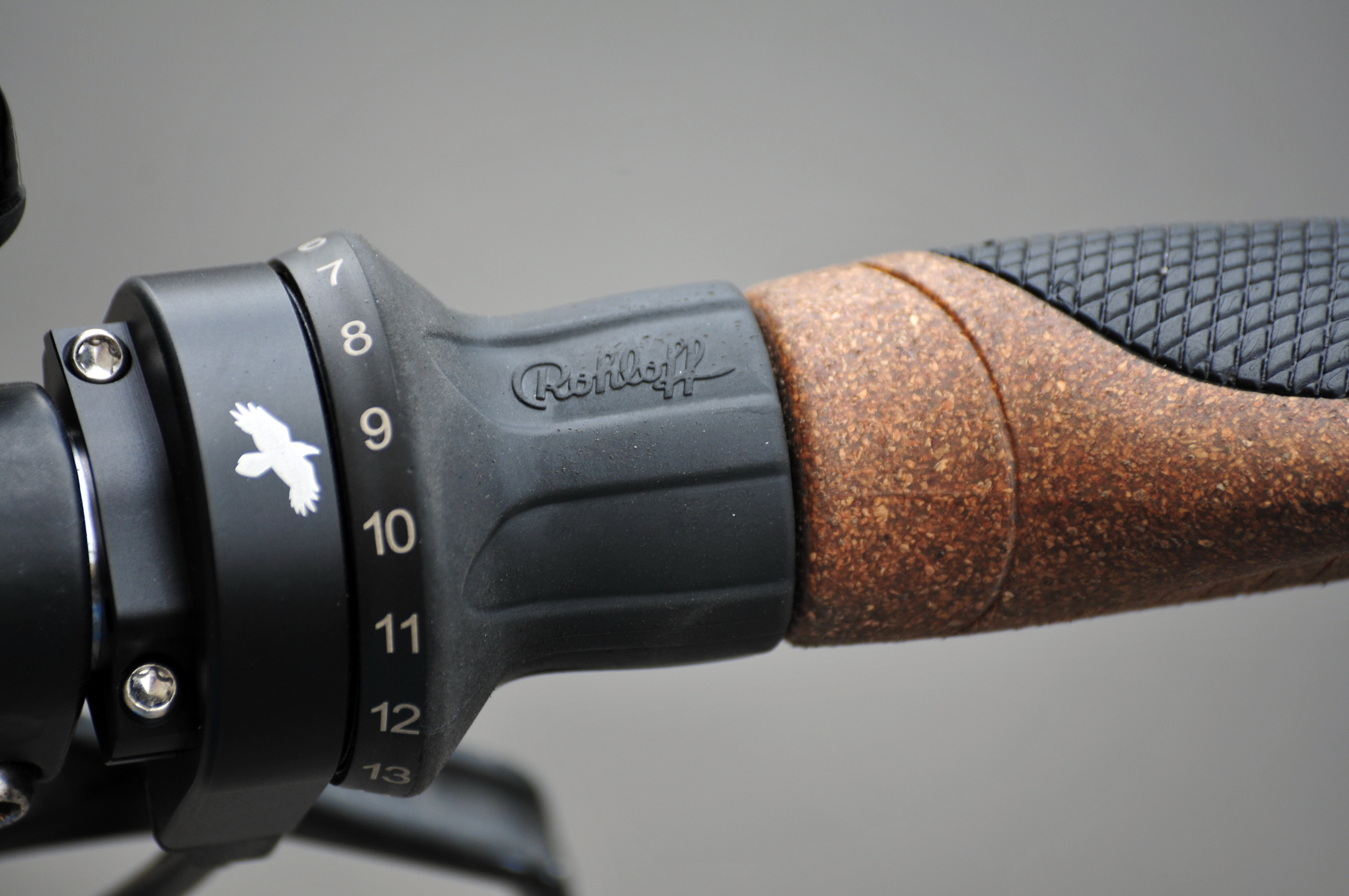
New twist shifter "light".

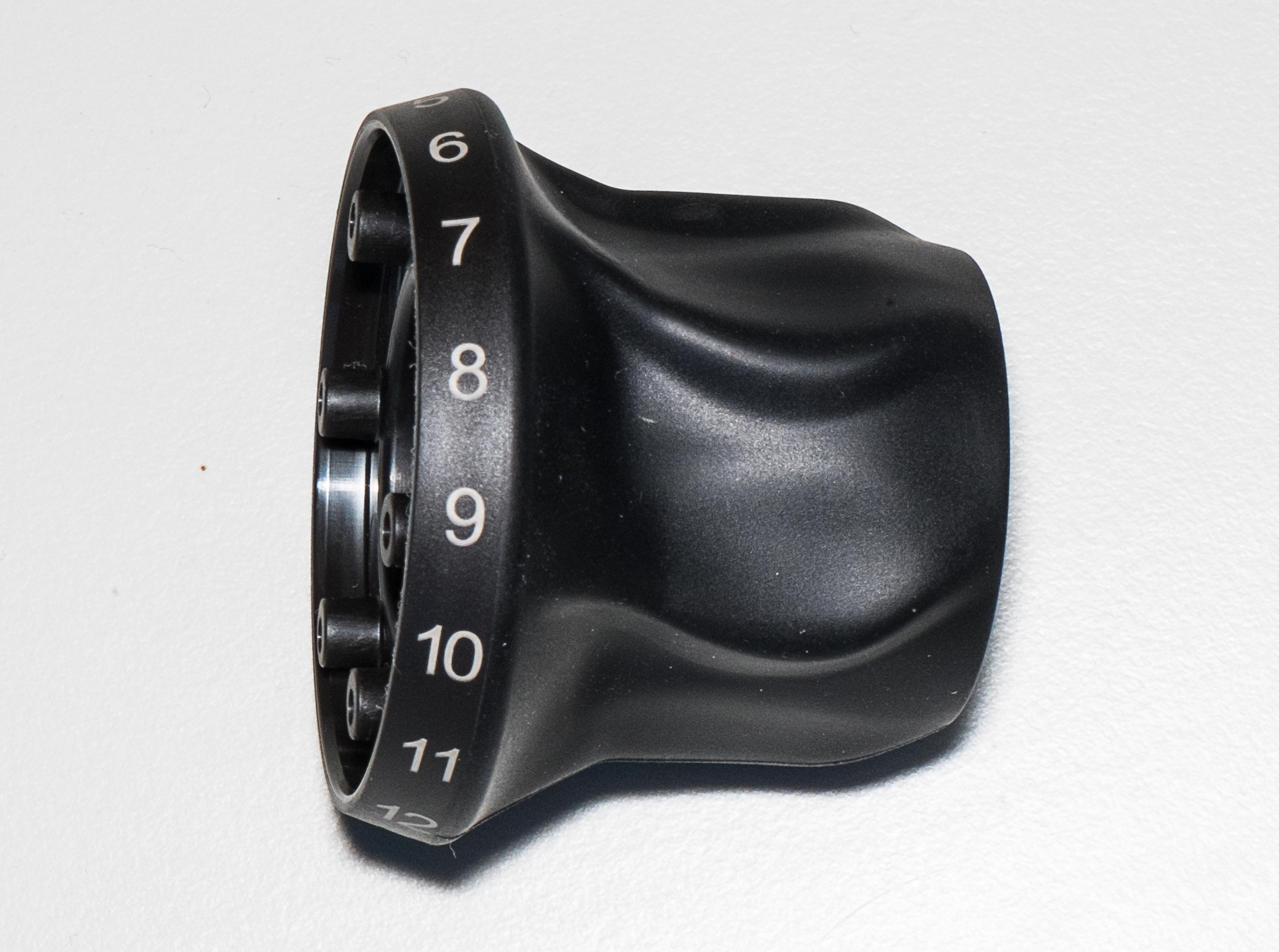

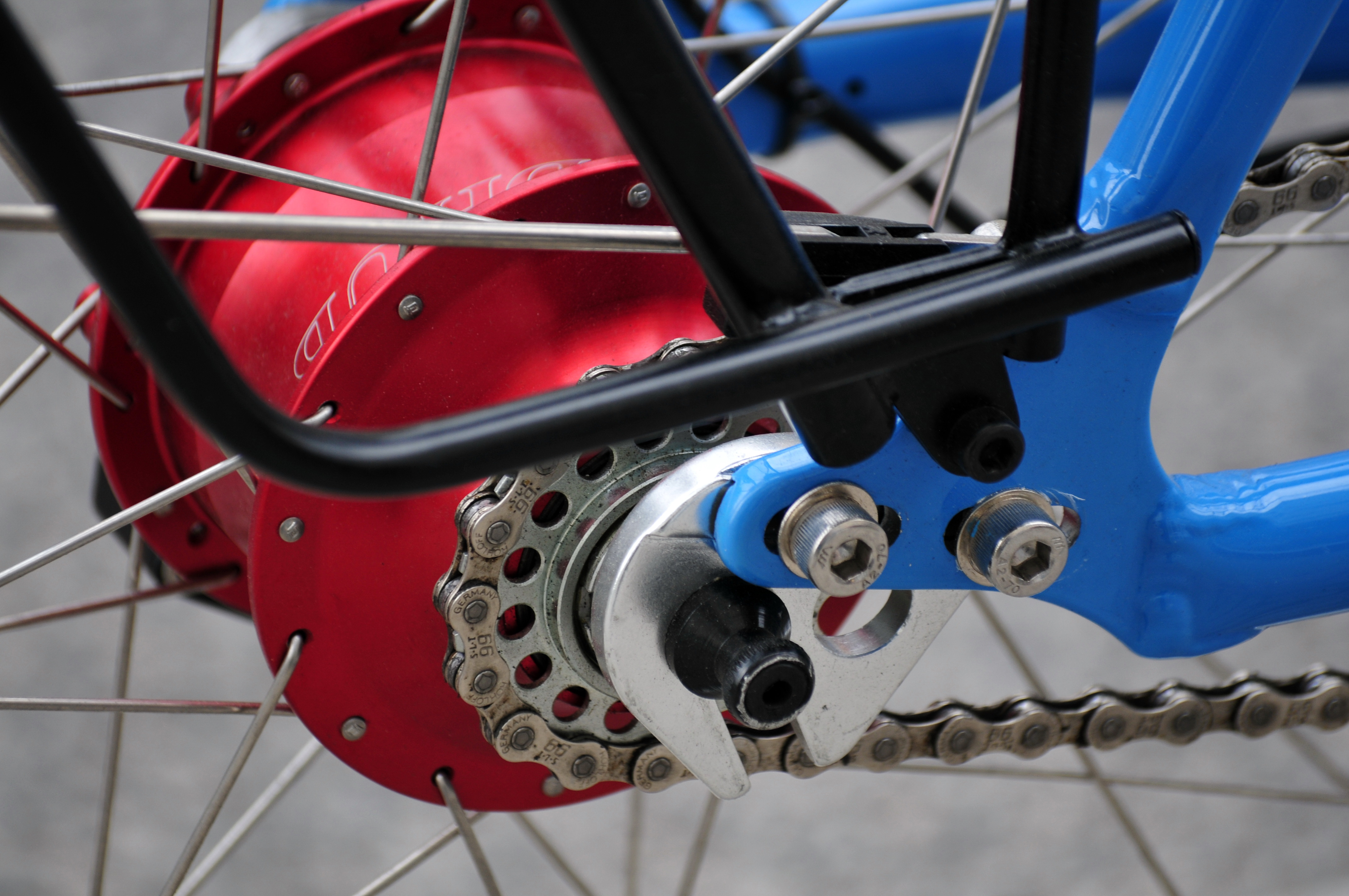
OEM-drop out.

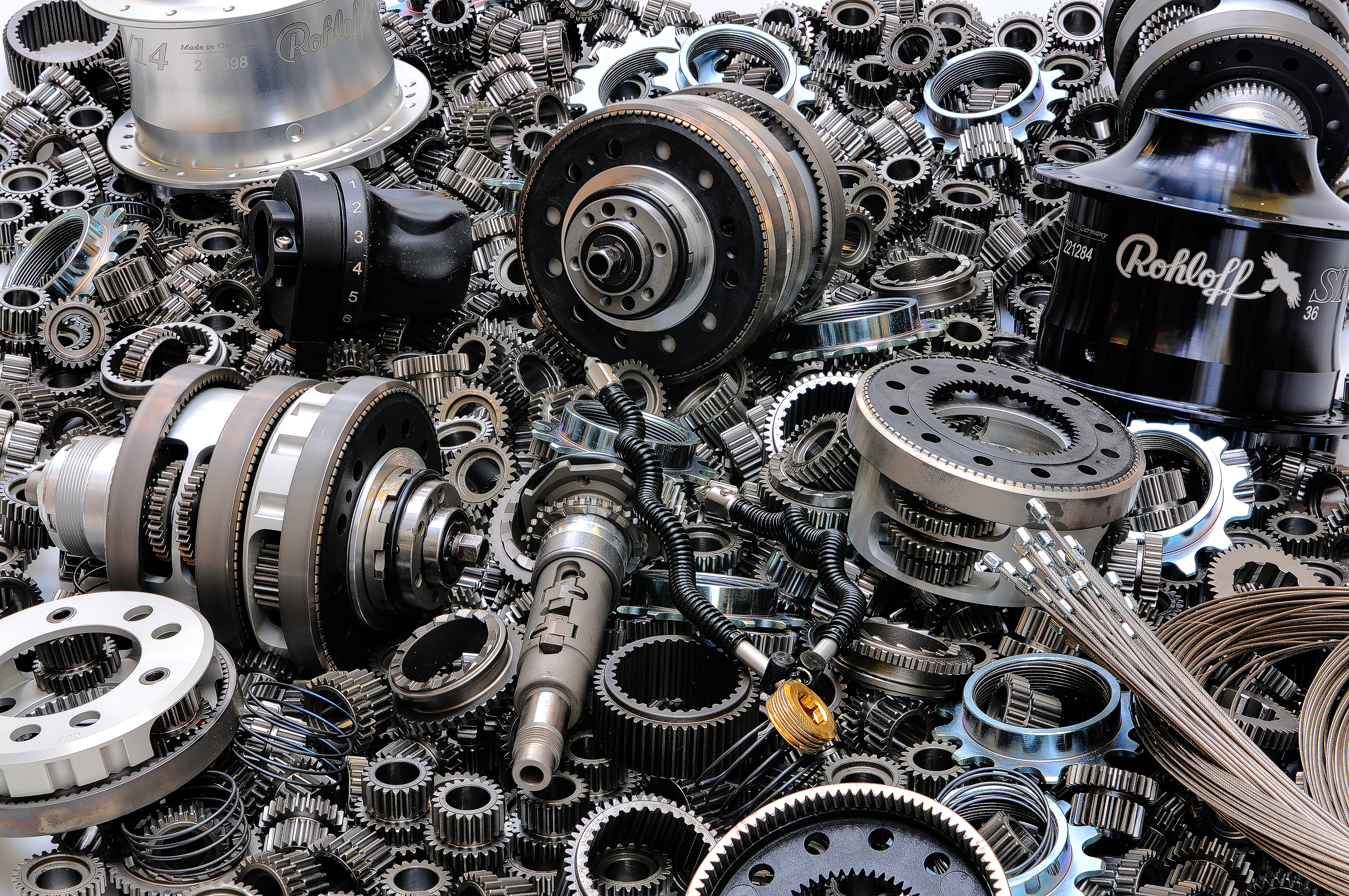
Parts of a Speedhub

== See also ==
- Comparison of hub gears
- Sachs Elan - a 12-speed internally geared hub manufactured by Sachs Bicycle Components from 1995 to 1999.
- Shimano Alfine - a product series of multispeed internally geared hubs.
- Sturmey-Archer
