= Three-speed bicycle =

Type of bicycle

The three-speed bicycle is a bicycle that uses internal hub gears at the rear wheel hub to provide three gear ratios.

Three-speed hubs have been in use since the early 1900s. Though they are heavier than comparable derailleur systems, internal-gear hub systems generally last longer and require less maintenance.

== Description ==
Typically, in low gear, the rear sprocket turns faster than the wheel; in middle gear, the rear sprocket turns at the same speed as the wheel; in high gear, the rear wheel turns faster than the sprocket.

== Use ==
During their heyday, three-speed hubs were used in all applications, including racing and time trialling, cargo cycling, utility cycling, and commuting. In many parts of the world, three-speed hubs are still preferred for commuting and other types of utility cycling over derailleur systems.
