= Sachs Elan =

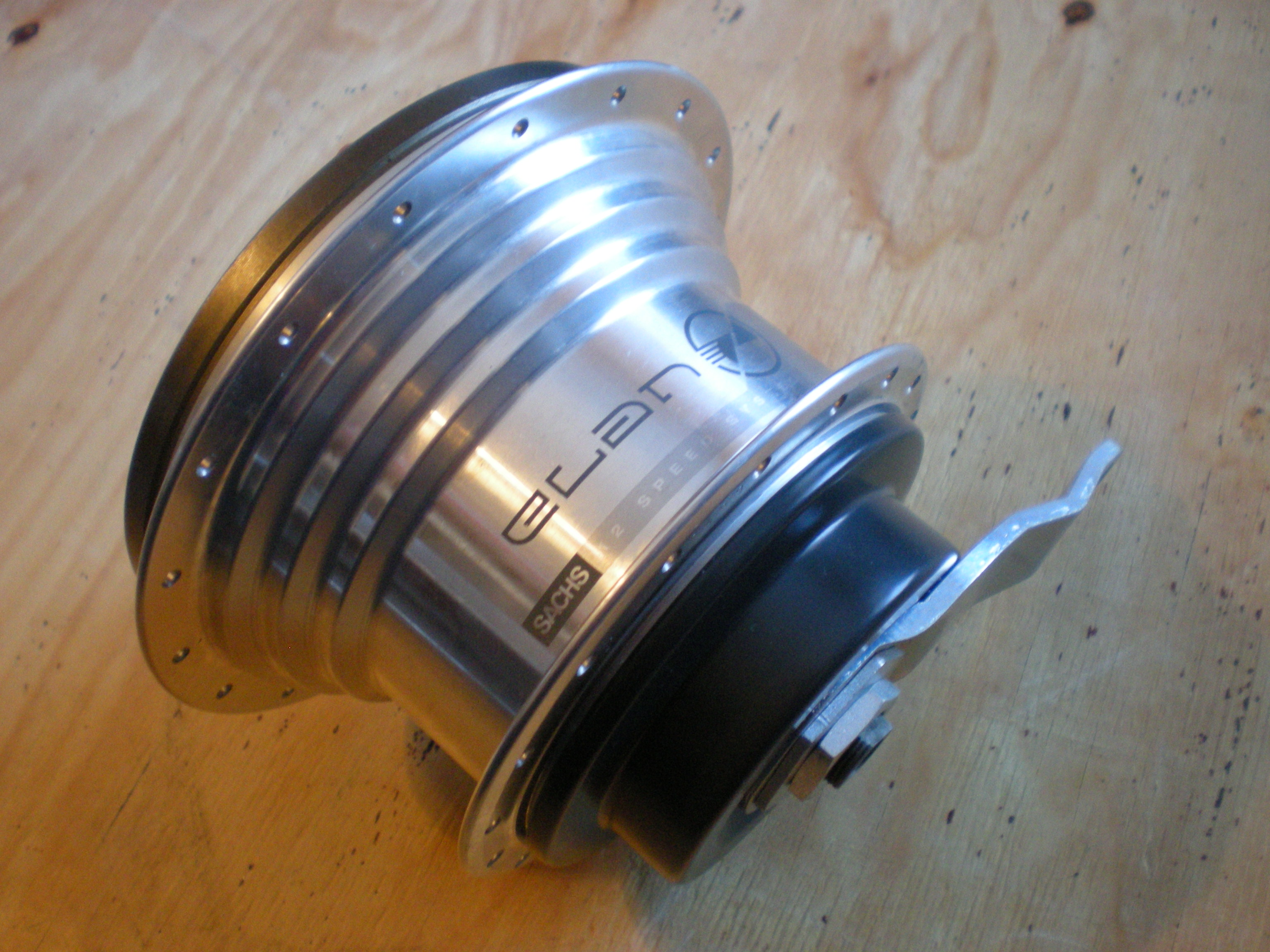
Sachs Elan, also known as SRAM Spectro E12, a 12 speed epicyclic internal gear hub, in coaster brake version, without auxiliary components.

The Sachs Elan was an epicyclic internal hub gear for bicycles, developed and manufactured by the bicycle division of the German company Fichtel & Sachs. It was considered heavy and production units were plagued with quality issues. The gear hub was discontinued before the turn of the 2000 millennium.

== History ==
The Elan was introduced in 1995 and manufactured until 1998. With its 12 speeds and an overall range of 339% it was the most advanced epicyclic hub gear at the time, and the first hub gear commercially available with more than 7 speeds.

After SRAM Corporation took over ownership of the German bicycle component manufacturer, the Elan was sold under the name Spectro E12.

The Elan received a blow with the introduction of the Speedhub 500/14 by the then small family-owned company Rohloff AG of Hessen, Germany, a technically more advanced product, and was discontinued before the turn of the 2000 millennium.

== Specifications ==
Weight was a full 3.4 kg (7 1/2 pounds) and 4 kg with an integrated coaster brake.

Gear ratios

Speed	Ratio	Percentage diff.
1	1,433	
2	1,174	22,1%
3	1	17,4%
4	0,848	17,9%
5	0,75	13,1%
6	0,675	11,1%
7	0,62	8,9%
8	0,566	9,5%
9	0,522	8,4%
10	0,485	7,6%
11	0,451	7,5%
12	0,423	6,6%

== Versions ==
- MH 12110 with coaster brake
- MH 12010 without coaster brake

== See also ==
- Comparison of hub gears
