= Sturmey-Archer =

Bicycle component manufacturer

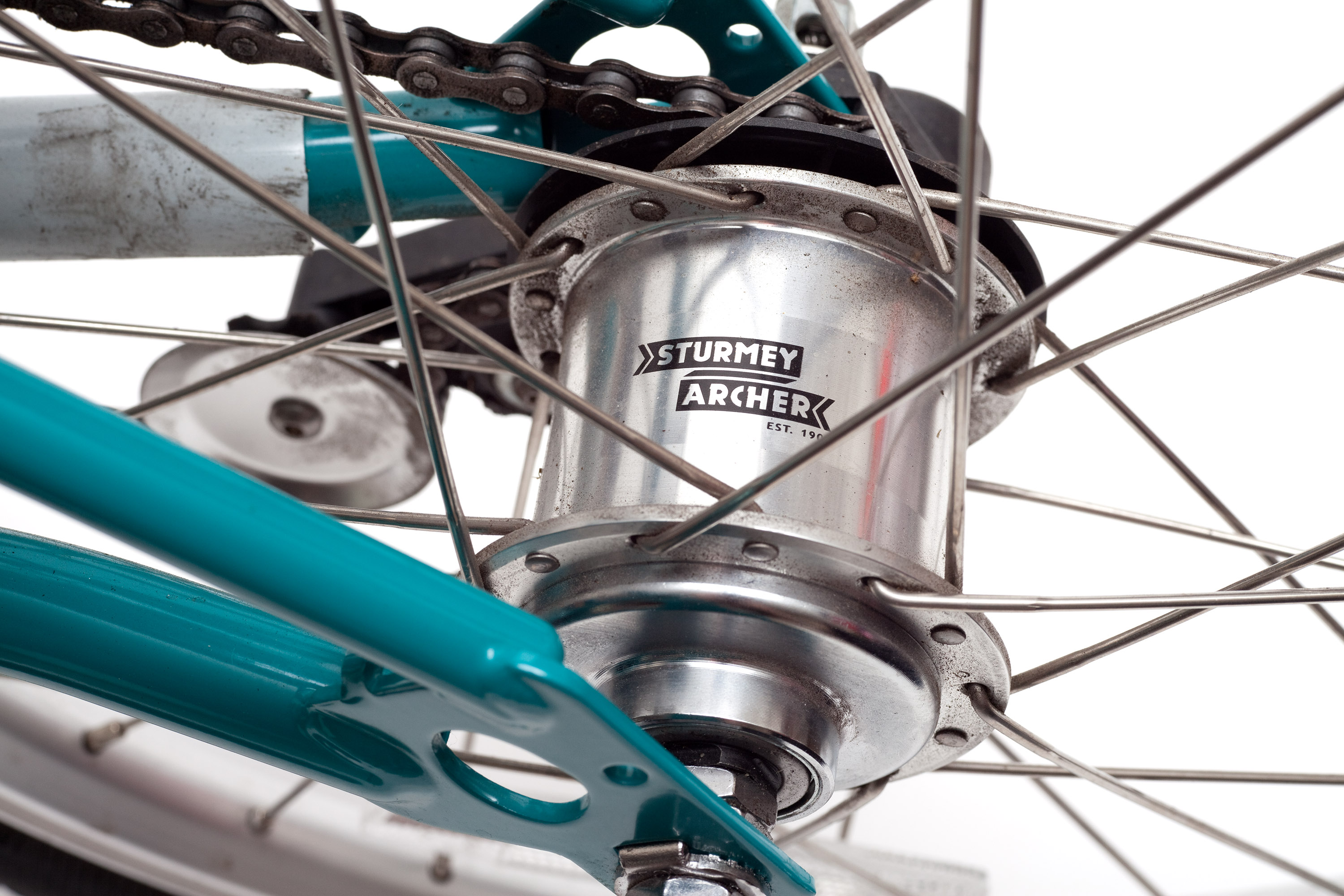
A Sturmey-Archer three-speed hub, the most common kind of Sturmey-Archer gear

Sturmey-Archer was a manufacturing company originally from Nottingham, England. It primarily produced bicycle hub gears, brakes and a great many other sundry bicycle components, most prominently during its heyday as a subsidiary of the Raleigh Bicycle Company. Earlier, it had also manufactured motorcycle hubs, gearboxes and engines.

The company was founded in 1902 by Henry Sturmey and James Archer under the guidance of Frank Bowden, the primary owner of Raleigh. In 2000, the assets and trademarks of Sturmey-Archer were sold to Sun Race of Taiwan, which was renamed Sun Race Sturmey-Archer Inc., and production moved to Taiwan.

== Products ==
All Sturmey-Archer gear hubs use epicyclic (planetary) geartrains of varying complexity. The AW is the simplest, using one set of planetary gears with four planets. The AM uses three compound planets with differently sized cogs machined from a common shaft to engage the gear ring and sun gear separately, while the close-ratio three-speeds, and hubs with four or more speeds, use multiple planetary geartrains. Depending on the specific hub these may be in series with each other, or with one or the other set being selectable at any given time by locking a particular sun gear to the axle.

=== 'K' family hub gears ===
In 1921, the K hub was introduced as an updated and improved version of the X, later FX hub (following the introduction of fine axle threading) - it is the Model X which was manufactured under license by BSA as their three-speed hub until 1956. The new K model three-speed had ratios of 75%, 100%, and 133%, the same as the later AW, however its internal workings were substantially different. Most notable was the six-prong ramped sliding clutch which was mounted between springs, this gave the advantage of lateral movement being possible without shifter movement and allowed gears to be pre-selected while pedalling, the ratio would change when pedal force was relaxed, freeing the mechanism to slide into the new gear and under spring pressure. The ramped clutch dogs and sprung mount also permitted the K hub to be without a neutral position between the 'Normal' direct drive gear, and the 'High' overdrive gear, both the SW and AW (until the mid-1990s) have this neutral position. The gear ring dogs would ratchet around the clutch using the ramps and springs if the hub was trying to engage Normal and High gear at the same time, though allowing this to happen through slow shifting can cause excessive clutch wear and render the hub inoperable. In Low gear, this isn't a problem as the low gear pawls can be overrun by a higher gear, while Normal and High gears use the same pawls, requiring an alternative solution.

The K hub spawned a Tricoaster version with back pedal brake, designated KC, in 1921 and both close ratio (KS), and medium ratio (KSW) variants in 1932 and 1933 respectively. With the introduction of 90mm drum brakes LBF/BF/BFC and LBR/BR/BRC in 1931, the first Sturmey-Archer 3-speed drum brake was introduced, the KB. The KB was joined in 1934 by the KT 111mm tandem drum brake, part of a family of 111mm drum brakes alongside the BFT and BRT front and rear drum brakes (BR type drum brakes are not gear hubs and are instead threaded for fixed sprockets or freewheels). The KT lasted only four years, being replaced by the AT (AW based 111mm drum brake) in 1938 when the K was replaced by the AW. The AT, BFT and BRT all went out of production because of hostilities in 1941 and never re-entered production.

=== 'T' family hub gears ===
Despite the primary selling point of Sturmey-Archer hubs being their offer of three gears when rivals managed only two, Sturmey-Archer produced a range of two-speed hubs in the 1930s. This began with the T and TF (identical hubs, F denoting a fixed sprocket) in 1933, alongside a version with a 90mm drum brake; with a rod brake operation and freewheel, this was TB, with a rod operation and fixed wheel, this was TBF, while a C was added to either designation to denote cable operated brakes instead of rods. In reality, an end user can easily switch between fixed and free, and rod and cable by swapping out common parts, though the hub shell will continue to show the designation for a given hub's original configuration. The T, TF, TB, TBF, TBFC, and TBC all had a 25% reduction below direct drive

In 1936, a close-ratio two-speed was introduced. This was called TC and offered a 13.46% reduction below direct drive.

Hubs manufactured in the 1930s have date stamps given as numbers at the ends of their model designations. This can be seen on examples of all of the hubs mentioned in this section as well as on some A- and F-family hubs. A 1936 TC hub would, for example, be marked TC6, TC 6 or TC-6.

=== 'A' and 'F' family hub gears ===
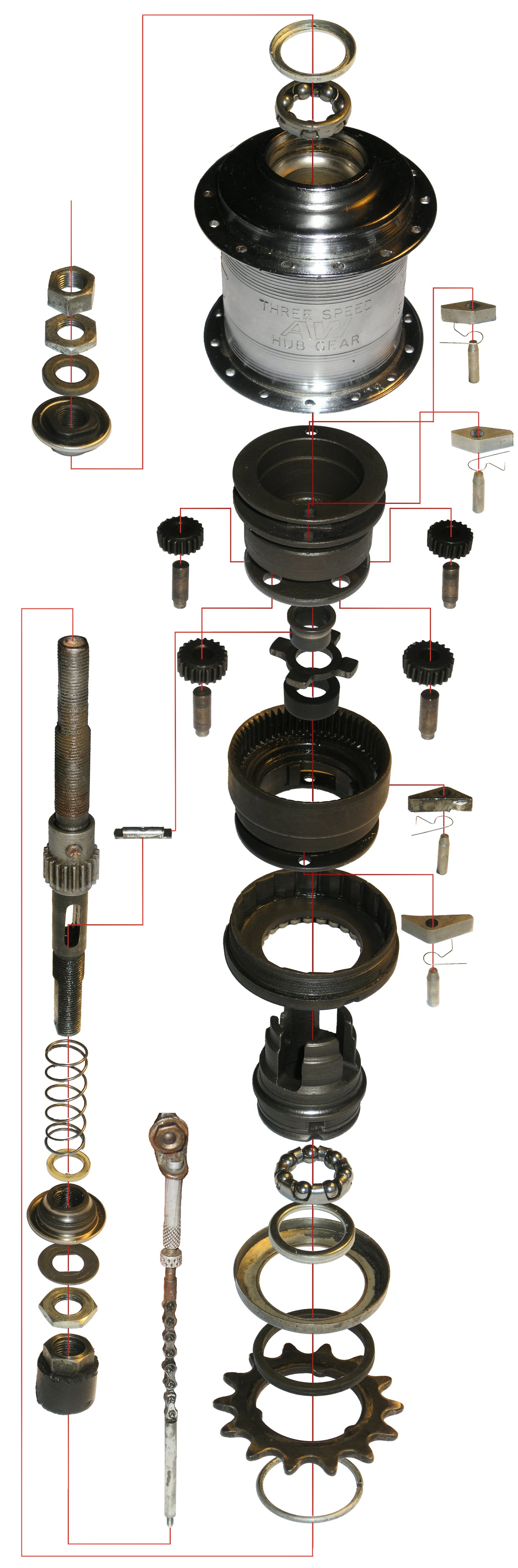
An exploded Sturmey-Archer AW

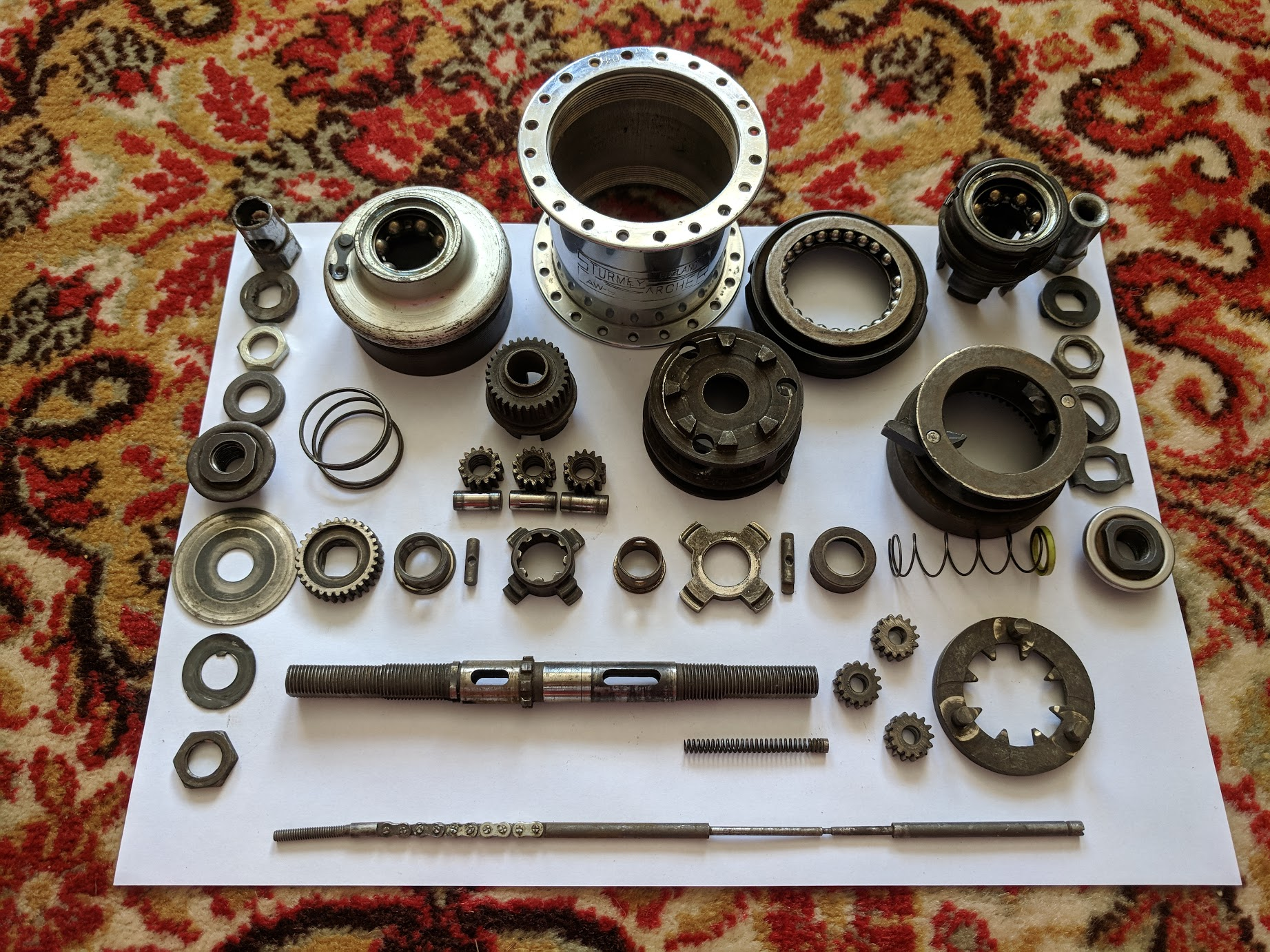
The internals of a Sturmey-Archer FM four-speed, medium ratio, hub gear. It has substantially more components than an AW three-speed. FC, AF, AC, and ASC hubs are similar.

Sturmey-Archer's most widely known product is the AW wide-ratio three-speed hub gear, introduced in 1938 (though patented in 1936) and still in production in a substantially modified form as of 2018. It is the sole survivor of a much larger range of "A" model three-speed hubs, including the AG Dynohub, AB 90mm drum brake hub, AM (medium ratio for "club" riders), the AC and AR (close ratio racing hubs for time trialists) and the ASC (a unique three-speed fixed gear). In 1939 a four-speed close ratio model AF was released, intended as a close ratio three-speed with an additional low gear for hills, this was discontinued in 1941 and succeeded by the near identical FC hub in 1947. 1939 also saw the introduction of the FM four-speed medium ratio hub, which was mechanically very similar to the AF and FC.

Post-war, in 1946, the FW four-speed wide-ratio hub was introduced and spawned the FG Dynohub and FB 90mm drum brake hub. the FG would come to characterise the output of the heyday of Raleigh Superbe model bicycles, while the relative longevity of the FW can be largely attributed to its deployment on high end Moulton Bicycles through the 1960s until its discontinuation in 1970.

The FW led to the development of a series of internally similar 'S5' five-speed models, and by 1994, Sturmey-Archer were producing seven-speed hubs. Production was low, and in the mid-2000s these were discontinued, hub geared bicycles having gone mostly out of fashion.

=== SW hub gears ===
The brief story of the Sturmey-Archer SW series medium-flange wide-ratio three-speed hub provides strong substantiation of the merits of the AW design.

Sturmey-Archer Gears Ltd. designed the type SW Mk. 1 medium-flange wide-ratio three-speed hub in 1954 and began production by 1955, intending it to replace the AW series of large-flange hubs which were intended for discontinuation upon the SW's introduction (AW hubs were still being produced in 1956, and may have continued throughout the SW's run, despite being absent from catalogues).

Compared to the AW's 25% reduction in first gear, direct-drive second gear, and 33.33% overdrive 3rd gear, the SW offered slightly wider gearing, referred to by Brian Hayes as "super-wide" gearing, with 27.7% reduction for first gear, direct-drive second, and taller 38.4% overdrive third gear. Riders appreciate the nearly silent operation of its springless 'centrifugal' pawls (while the pawls are often described as being centrifugal in operation, they in fact operate by a rocking motion as the freewheel ratchet teeth pass over them, pushing them back and forth in their slightly oversized sockets).

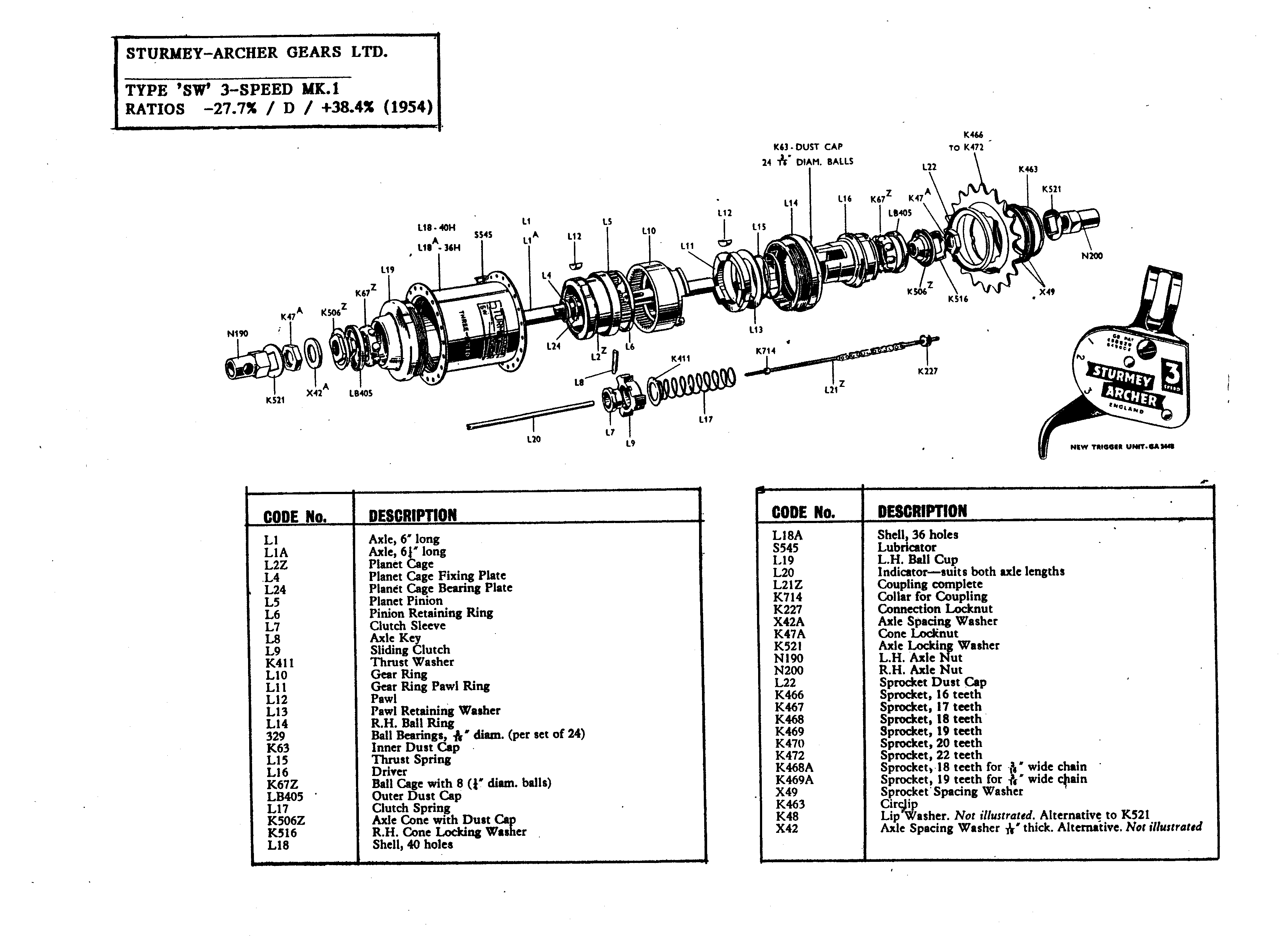
Exploded View & Parts List of Type SW three-speed Mk. 1. Sturmey-Archer Gears Ltd., 1954

Smaller and lighter than an AW hub, the SW was aptly, but unfortunately, described by Sturmey-Archer as having "fewer working parts than any other wide-ratio 3-Speed hub" and was thought to be less costly to manufacture than the AW series that had been in production since 1938.

The new hub turned out to be slow to engage drive because the mode of pawl engagement necessitated fewer freewheel stops and could not be "pre-shifted" like an AW can while changing 'up', and the AW's predecessor, the 'K', can while changing in either direction. This pre-selection of gears was never advocated by Sturmey-Archer. More troubling, the unique crescent-shaped pawls can have slippage issues, even with correct toggle chain adjustment, as engagement of only two of the three pawls in each freewheel is insufficiently stable to hold normal levels of torque. This is more pronounced in hubs which are sticky inside from incorrect lubrication, and ones which have been allowed to wear through poor maintenance or, less commonly, heavy use. Attempts were made to correct the issues the SW experienced, with surviving examples showing two different planet cage retention methods (mandating two different axle designs), three different planet cage pawl ring designs, two different gear ring designs, two different sliding clutch designs, two different pawl designs and two different axle key designs, one for each of the two indicator rod designs which were used with the SW, a two-piece, left-hand-indicating design between 1954 and mid-1958, requiring a plain drilling in the axle key and a fully drilled-through axle, and a less common threaded axle key, for use with a standard AW-type right-hand-indicating design, introduced at around the same time as the re-marketing of the AW in the late summer of 1958 and permitting the use of a partially solid axle.

Sturmey-Archer had intended for the SW to completely replace the AW hub, and had designed a complete family of SW series hubs. The SB was intended to replace the AB/ABC 3-speed hub with 90 mm drum brake, and the SG was intended to replace the AG three-speed 'Dyno-Three' Dynohub. Both the SB and SG would have used a modified set of SW internals with a shortened planet cage to facilitate the additional functionality on the left side of the hub. Technical drawings for both the SB and SG exist and both appeared in catalogues, however there is no evidence that either hub went into production and the AB/ABC and AG re-appeared alongside the AW in 1958.

The AW had been built under license by The Hercules Cycle and Motor Company as the A type in the 1940s and the B type in the 1950s (there is no functional difference and the letter merely denotes the decade). Hercules put their name on SW hubs too, though these are far less common than Sturmey-Archer branded SWs.

After the failure of the SW in the market and the re-commitment to the AW, Sturmey-Archer continued to widely license the design, with fully interchangeable clones of the AW eventually being made under labels including J.C. Higgins, Sears, Austro-Daimler, Brompton, Brampton, SunTour, and others.

=== S2 'Automatic' ===
In 1966 Sturmey-Archer launched a new two-speed hub with a backpedal shifting action similar to the Fichtel and Sachs 'Torpedo Zwei Gang Duomatic'. The S2 – Sturmey-Archer's first 2-speed hub since the demise of the T series in 1941 and the last two-speed they would make in the UK – featured a direct drive and a 28.6% gear reduction. While its lack of need for a gear cable might have led to the S2 being a popular choice for small wheeled and folding bicycles, the nature of the gears meant that a small wheeled bicycle would struggle to obtain acceptably high gearing within the constraints of a) the size of its wheels, b) the minimum size of sprocket which could be fitted and, c) the maximum size of chainwheel which could be obtained. For these reasons, it was commercially unsuccessful.

Shifting the S2's gears was achieved by reversing the pedal action such that the sprocket and driver rotated 1/4 turn anti-clockwise relative to the axle (the amount of pedal movement required for this is gearing dependent). The up-shift and down-shift process is the same, with the hub toggling between gears; there is a consequent risk of overshooting the desired gear. The S2 has no equivalent to the sliding clutch seen in 3- and 4-speed Sturmey-Archer hub designs, there is indeed no lateral movement within the hub in use.

To achieve this radically different mode of shifting gears, the hub featured a unique driver with a 4 spline keyed socket in the middle (similar to, though not interchangeable with, later 'No Intermediate Gear' AW drivers), into which sat a selector sleeve. The 4 cuttings on the selector sleeve (2 shallow and 2 deep, arranged alternately) enabled the selector sleeve to transmit drive from the driver to the backs of the two unique high gear pawls, with said pawls either allowed to engage the hub shell for direct drive (deep selector sleeve cutting) or tripped out such that drive is transmitted only to the gear ring (shallow selector sleeve cutting). Low gear then operates in the same way as on an AW hub, with the drive of the ring gear turning the planet cage (via the planet gears) – and hence the shell – at a reduced speed.

The S2 hub features three low gear pawls mounted in its shortened planet cage, necessitating a low gear freewheel track with twelve stops instead of the 10 which would be found on a contemporary AW, this means that an S2 freewheeling in low gear will tick more frequently and more loudly than an AW in low gear at the same speed in a wheel of the same size. Because of this difference in the left (low gear) freewheel, and the short planet cage, the S2 has a gear ring pressed into the shell near the middle, with the mechanism occupying little more than half of the shell volume and the rest being left empty. For this reason, the S2 has a unique shell and its internals cannot be installed in the shell of another model.

The S2 is an unusual hub, with only 12,500 produced, and they are rarely available for sale. The hub was discontinued in 1972 and should not be confused with the S2, S2C and S2K hubs currently manufactured in Taiwan by Sun Race Sturmey-Archer.

=== Hybrid gear options ===
Sturmey-Archer hubs are seen by many as an alternative to Derailleur gears, however on many models of Sturmey-Archer hub, the two can be combined to offer a setup with many of the benefits of both systems - offering more, closer spaced, gears while continuing to offer a very wide overall range.

The majority of Sturmey-Archer gear hubs can be converted to hybrid gearing by fitting a rear derailleur to the bike and finding a suitable method of attaching more than one sprocket to the hub driver.

For the 'three spline' driver, an additional sprocket may be added in place of the spacers so long as care is taken to ensure the gap between the sprockets is not so great that the chain will drop into it instead of moving between sprockets. Two sprocket blocks have been produced for these hubs in the past too, though these are now obsolete and hard to find.

For the 12-spline driver of late 1930s and 1940s sporting hubs, similar arrangements may be made as for a 3-spline driver, however component sourcing is likely to be a bigger problem in line with the general scarcity of these drivers and the sprockets which fit them.

For the threaded drivers which were fitted to touring hubs before 1951, a standard thread-on freewheel may be fitted, although care must be taken to ensure there is sufficient clearance in the frame and sufficient thread engagement to ensure the setup is safe. More than three sprockets is unlikely to yield successful results.

Some Sturmey-Archer hubs, by their design, are fundamentally incompatible with hybrid gearing and hybrid setups should not be attempted with them. These are:

- AF, FM, FC, and AC because of the secondary planet train which is used to advance the sun gear in Low and High gears, this causes the internals to turn as the bike freewheels and applies tension to the bottom of the chain, this tension will damage a derailleur setup. For the same reason, it is normal for bikes with these hubs to spin their pedals when they are pushed forwards, where on other Sturmey-Archer gear hubs this would indicate an overtightened left hand bearing cone.
- ASC Three Speed fixed gear, in addition to the reason set out above, any fixed-gear hub is incompatible with derailleur gearing because of the need to apply chain tension in both directions when slowing down on a fixed-gear bike.

=== Dynohub ===
The Dynohub was Sturmey-Archer's hub dynamo (generator) for bicycles. The initial GH12 12-volt model was introduced in 1936 and followed two years later by the GH8. This 8-volt unit was discontinued in 1941 and replaced in 1945 by the lighter-weight GH6 6-volt version, which remained in production until 1984. The term "dynohub" is sometimes applied generically to bicycle hub dynamos, but it originates as, and remains, a trademark.

The GH6 version produced a rated output of 6 V, 0.33 A (2 W) from a 20-pole ring magnet with a stator having a continuous winding. Original headlamp bulbs are 6 V, 0.25 A (1.5 W) (e.g., CRY5) and a rear bulb of 6 V 0.04A (0.24W) (e.g., CRY8). This is different from a modern standard bicycle dynamo, though replacements can still be obtained. Common substitutions are the modern standard 2.4 W headlamp bulb and a tail lamp bulb of 0.6 W. One rider reports much more light with a 6.3 V, 0.25 A (1.6 W) type 40 bulb. LED conversions are possible and will output a much brighter light than incandescent or halogen bulbs, though the LED alternatives require the fitting of a voltage regulator and will strobe 10 times per wheel revolution if not fitted with a capacitor or rectifier to smooth the AC current output from the Dynohub.

Rated output was reached at around 20 km/h (12 mph), a rotational speed of approximately 160 rpm. The name dynamo implies DC output, but as usual with bicycle dynamos (known as generators in North America), output was in fact alternating current.

Dynohubs were offered as front hubs and as rear geared hubs. The AG was an AW three-speed rear hub with inbuilt dynamo, while the FG was a dynamo similarly combined with an FW four-speed. An SG 'Super-Wide' three-speed Dynohub was planned between 1954 and 1960, but never produced. An FG hub can be converted to have 5 gears using the same methods of modification as would be used for an FW to enable individually selectable sun gears.

Hub generators were absent from Sturmey-Archer's product range from 1984 until the 2006 introduction of the X-FDD front hub, which combines a 6v, 0.4 A (2.4 W) or 0.5 A (3 W) dynamo with a 70 mm drum brake.

=== Modern gear hubs (Sun Race Sturmey-Archer) ===
The XRF8, XRD8, XRR8, and XRK8 8-speed hubs entered series production in 2007.

Sun Race Sturmey-Archer have modified the design and manufacture in many respects; compared to the old AW hub, the current three-speed equivalent (SRF3) now has an aluminium alloy shell for lighter weight (a painted-steel shelled 'Steelite' version is still available, and branded AW). According to Schraner and Brandt, an aluminium alloy shell reduced spoke breakage due to aluminium being softer allowing the spoke to seat into the flange and disperse the stress at the bend in the spoke over a wider area.

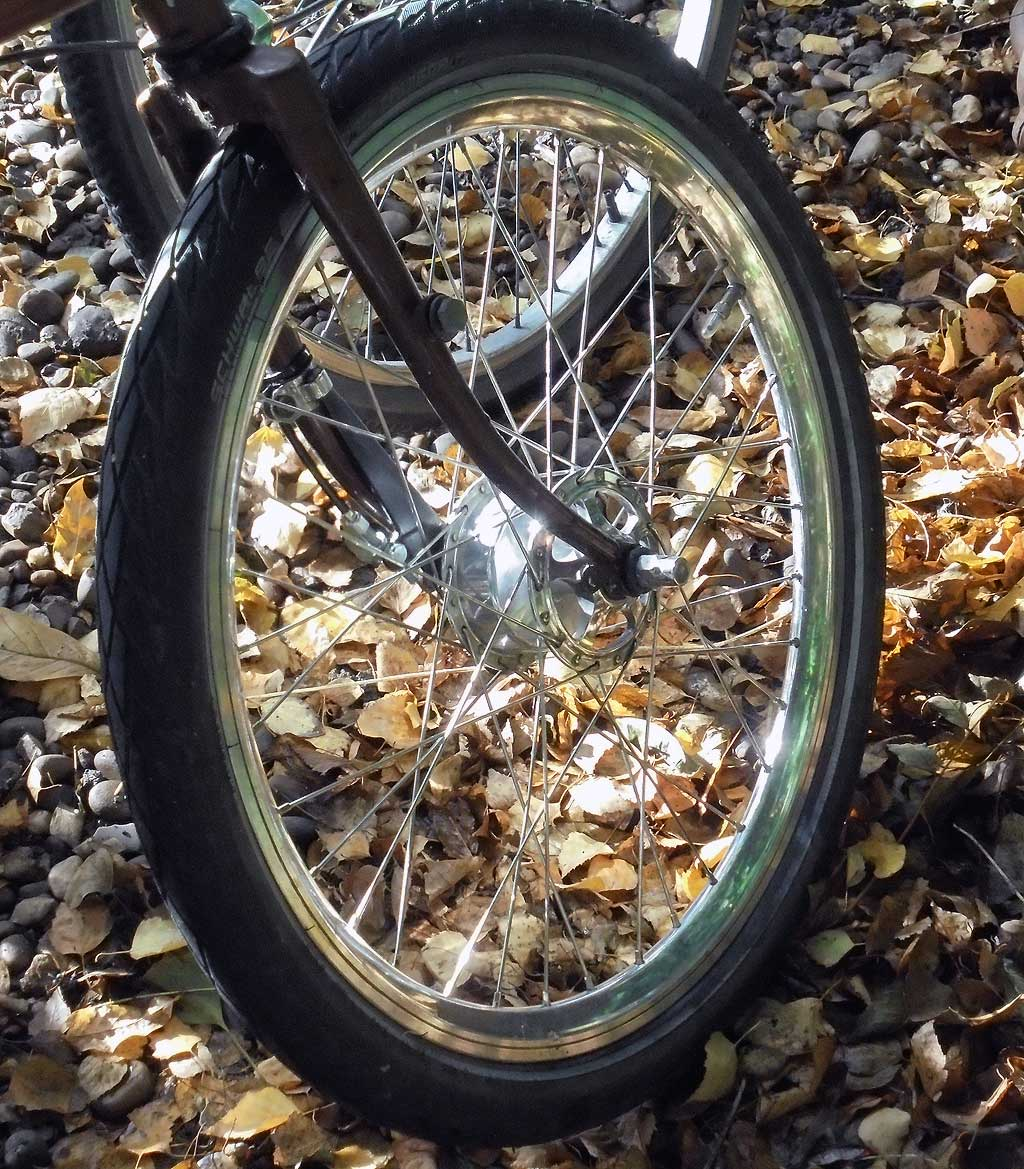
Sturmey-Archer X-FD front hub brake

The company produced front hub brakes to match such as the 70mm X-FD model, featuring sealed cartridge bearings.

In 2010 Sturmey-Archer launched a new range of duomatic 2-speed hubs, re-using the S2 name from the late 1960s, these hubs – designated S2 (freewheel), S2C (backpedal brake), and S2K (6 bolt disc brake) – share their general engineering principles with the original S2, but do not share any internal components. They offer a direct gear and an overdrive of 38%, a significant improvement for usability over the 'underdrive' gear of the original S2.

==== Three-speed fixed gear hub ====
In 2009 Sun Race Sturmey-Archer re-introduced a three-speed fixed gear hub, the S3X. This gives ratios of 100/75/62.5 (i.e. the top gear is direct drive and the others are geared down from it) and the internals are based on the newest five-speed freewheel hub (in the same way as the original fixed ASC was based on the contemporary FC four-speed hub).

=== Other ===
Sturmey-Archer made various models of 70 mm and 90 mm drum brakes with both steel and aluminium bodies.

The Sturmey-Archer name was also affixed to the 49 cc two-stroke engine fitted to early Raleigh mopeds, although it was actually a reworking of Vincenti Piatti's "Trojan Mini-Motor", and built by BSA's motorcycle operation.

== See also ==
- Comparison of hub gears
