= Kindernay =

Kindernay was a brand of hub gears manufactured by the Norwegian start-up company CA Technology Systems. They used hydraulic gear levers and were manufactured in Oslo, Norway. Their system differed from their competitors by having a modular design called Swap Cage where the gear mechanism can be easily separated from the hub housing, so that the end-user can use the hub gear with several different wheel sets. This could make it easier and more economical to change wheel sets to adapt the bike for different seasons or roads, or so that wheels can be easily changed between bikes. The hubs are assembled at Kindernay's factory in Oslo by hand, but in the long term it was planned that production be automated and assembled by robots.

== History ==
In 2000, the entrepreneur Christian Antal was studying economics when he began to materialize his interest in developing a bicycle gear, and entered into a collaboration with the mechanical engineer Knut Tore Ljøsne, who had previously worked at Kongsberg Automotive.

In 2010, CA Technology Systems was founded. A prototype of the 14-speed Kindernay XIV hub was presented in 2016.

In 2021 Kindernay was one of the winners of the prestigious Eurobike award for their 7-speed hub model Kundernay VII which is approved for 160 Nm, and is designed to withstand heavy loads that can occur on for example cargo bikes. The efficiency of the XI hub has been tested by the Norwegian University of Science and Technology, and achieved an efficiency in the test rig between 94.4% for 1st gear and 99.5% for 11th gear.

In late 2023 Kindernay went bankrupt.

== Technical ==
Compared to their main competitor Rohloff who makes hub gears with 6 planetary series, Kindernay uses 3, which they claim simplifies the design and reduces weight. Kindernay claims to have patented the important innovations of their system, and that they have patents that last until 2032. The wheels have freehub with 24 points of engagement, and Kindernay differs by having a 12 mm through-axle on all their models. Their hubs can be adapted to frames with standard widths of 135 mm, 142 mm and 148 mm.

== See also ==
- Rohloff
- Shimano Alfine
