= Rolon =

Rolon (or Rolón) is a surname. Notable people with the surname include:

- Agustín Pedro Justo Rolón (1876–1943), Argentine military officer
- Camila Rolón (1842–1913), Argentine religious sister
- Carlos Rolón (born 1970), American artist
- Carlos Rolón (born 1992), Paraguayan footballer
- Esteban Rolón (born 1995), Argentine footballer
- Giselle Gómez Rolón (born 1992), Argentine model
- Ismael Blas Rolón Silvero (born 1914), Paraguayan Catholic prelate
- Gabriel Rolón (born 1961), Argentine psychologist
- José Jacinto Rolón (1821–1910), Argentine founder
- José María Rolón (1826–1862), Argentine priest and politician
- Juan Rolón (born 1930), Argentine wrestler
- Leonardo Rolón (born 1995), Argentine footballer
- Luis Román Rolón (born 1968), Puerto Rican boxer
- Mariano Benito Rolón (1790–1849), Argentine military officer
- Martín Rolón (born 1983), Argentine football coach
- Maxi Rolón (1995–2022), Argentine footballer
- Raimundo Rolón (1903–1981), briefly President of Paraguay
- Zenón Rolón (1856–1902), Argentine musician

== See also ==
- Formula Rolon, open wheel single seater Formula Racing car made and raced in India
