= Rohloff =

German manufacturer of bicycle components

Coordinates: 51°20′53″N 9°31′00″E

Rohloff AG
- Industry: Cycling components
- Founded: 1986
- Headquarters: Fuldatal, Germany
- Key people: Barbara Rohloff
- Products: Bicycle related components, internal gear hubs, chains, tools, lubrication
- Number of employees: 45
- Website: www.rohloff.de

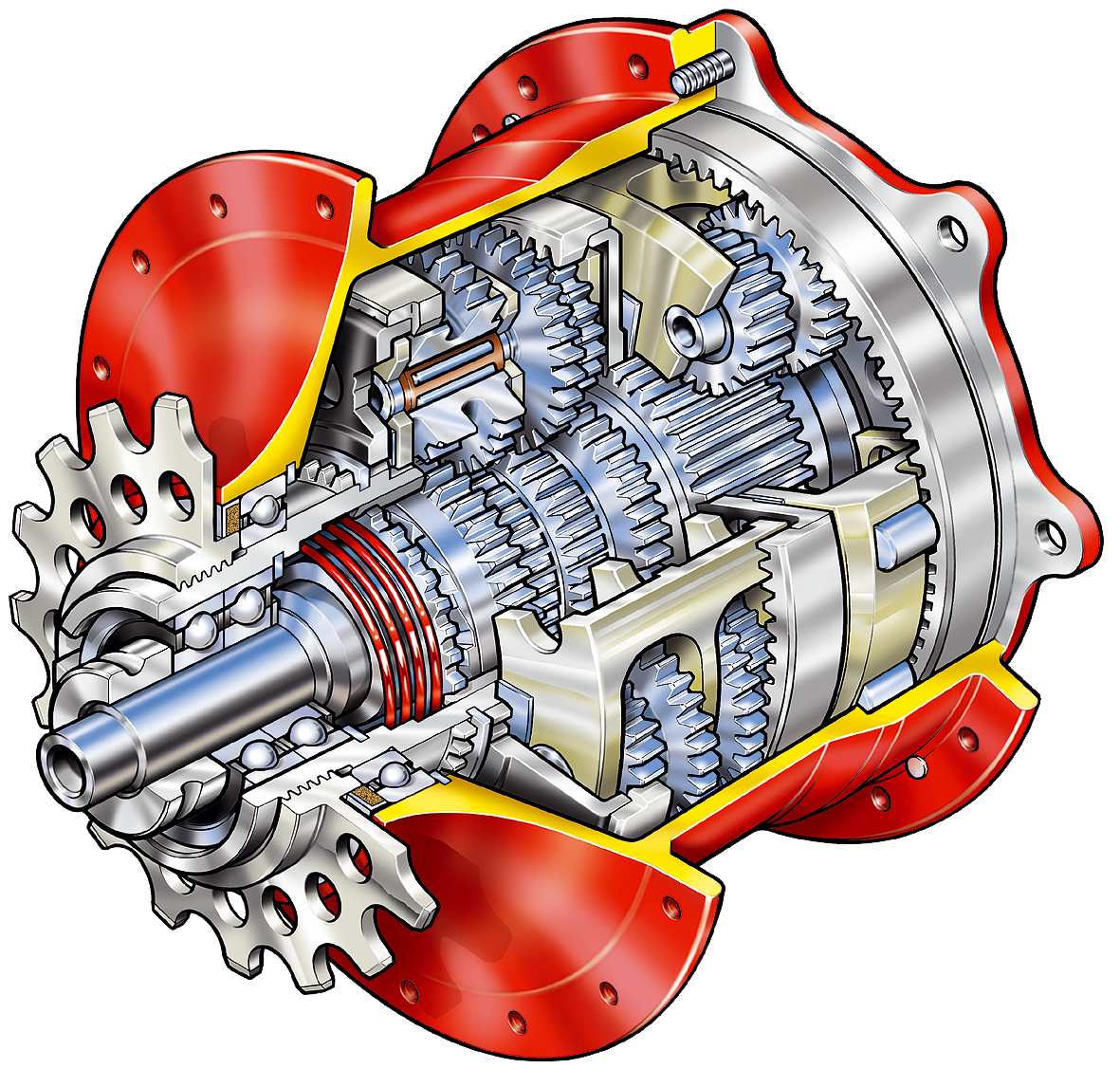
Internal Schematic of a Rohloff Speedhub 500/14

Rohloff AG is a German company from Fuldatal near Kassel that manufactures hub gears, bicycle chains and tools that are known for their durability and high performance. The company's logo is a black silhouette of a raven on a yellow background.

== History ==
Rohloff AG was founded in 1986 and began by producing a high-tech, premium priced bicycle chain, the SLT 99. Sales of this chain generated revenues of €1m in 1991, and approximately €0,5m annually from 1992 to 1998.

=== Development of Rohloff Speedhub 500/14 ===
While at the Tour de France road race in France in 1994, the Rohloffs went bicycling on the beach in France. The bikes got stuck in the sand, and the primitive derailleur gear systems would not work properly. This triggered Bernhard Rohloff to develop a new internally geared hub.

At the 1996 IFMA in Cologne, Rohloff announced a 14-speed gear hub with a weight of 1700 grams. At the time, the gear hub with the greatest number of speeds was the unreliable 3700 gram 12 speed Sachs Elan (discontinued by 2000), made by the hub-gear manufacturer Sachs (later acquired by SRAM). A year later Rohloff presented a workable prototype at the 1997 IFMA and won a crate of champagne from the employees at Sachs, who had bet against them the year before. The managing director of the dominant cycling component manufacturer Shimano approached Rohloff and asked: "Shimano could release a 14 speed gear hub onto the market tomorrow, but it would weigh double as much as yours" – "How do you manage this?"

The Rohloffs had been granted a DM 1 million bank loan for development of the new product, and for the start of production, guarantees in the amount of several million marks. At this time, the design just existed on paper. The company was not successful in raising financing from investors. However, just 10 days after IFMA, the loan guarantees were retracted. The granting bank had gone bankrupt, was acquired by another bank, and the restructuring specialist hired had previously been involved with financing development of the competing Sachs Elan hub.

Rohloff searched but was unable to raise a bank loan. The company was in dire straits; if the product could not be launched, it could not repay the loans. The founders had personally guaranteed for the initial million mark loan.

Eventually Rohloff obtained a state guarantee which paved the way for a bank loan to pay local parts suppliers and commence production of the Speedhub. The decision maker at the financial and economic ministry in Hessen was a keen cyclist. When he had first heard of the Rohloff, he had already decided to buy a hub if it became available. Following a test-ride in May 1998, the loan was granted, enabling Rohloff AG to sign production contracts with local suppliers by the summer. The first Speedhub units were shipped to customers by Christmas of 1998.

== Products ==
Each year Rohloff produces approximately 20,000 gear hubs. The Rohloff Speedhub 500/14 is the only bicycle hub with 14 gears, which can replace a regular chain derailleur system regarding level of friction and range of transmission.

Rohloff AG also used to make an automatic chain lubrication system called Lubmatic, and cycle tools such as a chain riveting tool and a chain measurement tool.

=== Speedhub production ===
Rohloff Speedhub 500/14
Production year	Serial numbers	Production
1998	000000 – 000400	401
1999	000401 – 002700	2300
2000	002701 – 006500	3800
2001	006501 – 0012000	5500
2002	012001 – 0018800	6800
2003	018801 – 027700	8900
2004	027701 – 038500	10800
2005	038501 – 050049	11549
2006	050050 – 065000	14951
2007	065001 – 081600	16600
2008	081601 – 100000	18400
2009	100001 – 115900	15900
2010	115901 – 135800	19900
2011	135801 – 153000	17200

== See also ==
- Comparison of hub gears
