= Hub gear =

Device for changing gear ratio on bikes

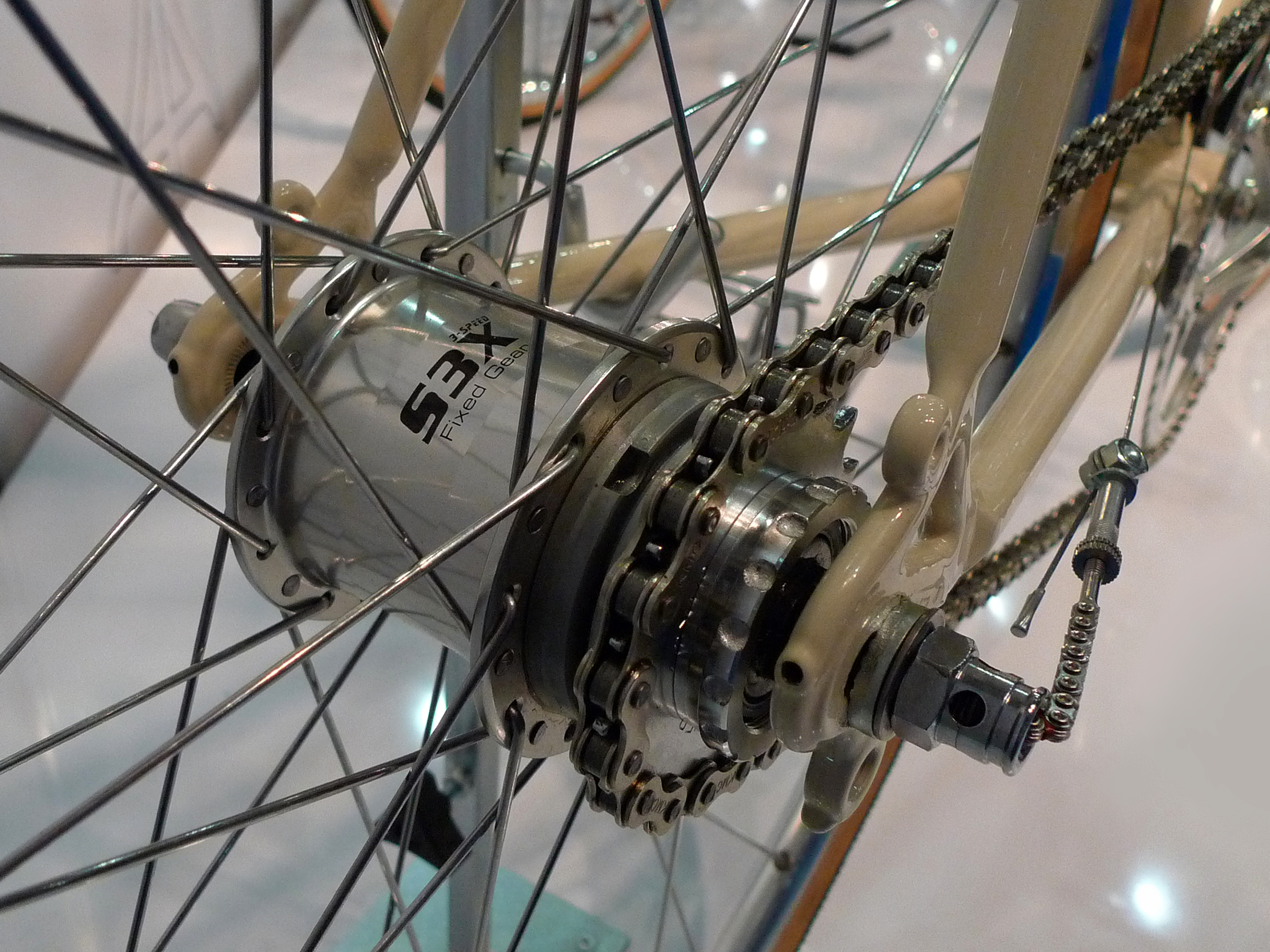
Sturmey-Archer S3X

A hub gear, internal-gear hub, internally geared hub or just gear hub is a gear ratio changing system commonly used on bicycles that is implemented with planetary or epicyclic gears. The gears and lubricants are sealed within the shell of the hub gear, in contrast with derailleur gears where the gears and mechanism are exposed to the elements. Changing the gear ratio was traditionally accomplished by a shift lever connected to the hub with a Bowden cable, and twist-grip style shifters have become common.

Hub gear systems generally have a long and largely maintenance-free life though some are not suitable for high-stress use in competitions or hilly, off-road conditions. They are common in utility bicycles used for commuting in urban areas. Bicycles such as European city bikes are now commonly fitted with 7-speed gear-hubs and 8-speed systems are becoming increasingly available. Older or less costly utility bicycles often use 3-speed gear-hubs, such as in bicycle sharing systems. Many folding bicycles use 3-speed gear-hubs. Modern developments with up to 18 gear ratios are available.

== History ==
Before epicyclic gears were used in bicycle hubs, they were used on tricycles. Patents for epicyclic hubs date from the mid-1880s. The first patent for a compact epicyclic hub gear was granted in 1895 to the American machinist Seward Thomas Johnson of Noblesville, Indiana, U.S.A. This was a 2-speed but was not commercially successful.

In 1896, William Reilly of Salford, England patented a 2-speed hub which went into production in 1898 as 'The Hub'. It was a great success, remaining in production for a decade. It rapidly established the practicality of compact epicyclic hub gears.

By 1902, Reilly had designed a 3-speed hub gear. He parted company with the manufacturer of 'The Hub' but had signed away to them the intellectual rights to his future gear designs. To circumvent this problem, the patents for Reilly's 3-speed were obtained in the name of his colleague, James Archer. Meanwhile, well-known English journalist and inventor Henry Sturmey had also invented a 3-speed hub. In 1903, Frank Bowden, head of the Raleigh Bicycle Company, formed The Three-Speed Gear Syndicate, having obtained the rights to both the Reilly/Archer and Sturmey 3-speeds. Reilly's hub went into production as the first Sturmey Archer 3-speed.

In 1902, Mikael Pedersen (who also produced the Dursley Pedersen bicycle) patented a 3-speed hub gear and this was produced in 1903. This was said to be based on the "counter shaft" principle but was arguably an unusual epicyclic gear, in which a second sun was used in place of a ring gear. In 1904 the Fichtel & Sachs company (Germany, Schweinfurt) produced a hub gear under license to Wanderer, and by 1909, there were 14 different 3-speed hub gears on the British market.

By the 1930s, hub gears were used on bicycles all over the world. They were particularly popular in the UK, the Netherlands, the German-speaking countries and Scandinavia. Since the 1970s, they have become much less common in English-speaking countries, but in many parts of northern Europe, where bicycles are regularly used as daily transport rather than merely for sport or leisure, hub gears are still widely used. The cheaper and stronger (but less reliable) derailleur systems, which offer a wider gear range, have now started to appear.

By 1987, Sturmey-Archer made only 3- and 5-speed hubs, and Fichtel & Sachs and Shimano made only 2- and 3-speed hubs. In that year, the first book (apart from service manuals) for some 80 years dealing solely with epicyclic bicycle gears was published. Since then, there has been a slow but steady increase in interest in hub gears, reflected in the wider range of products now available.

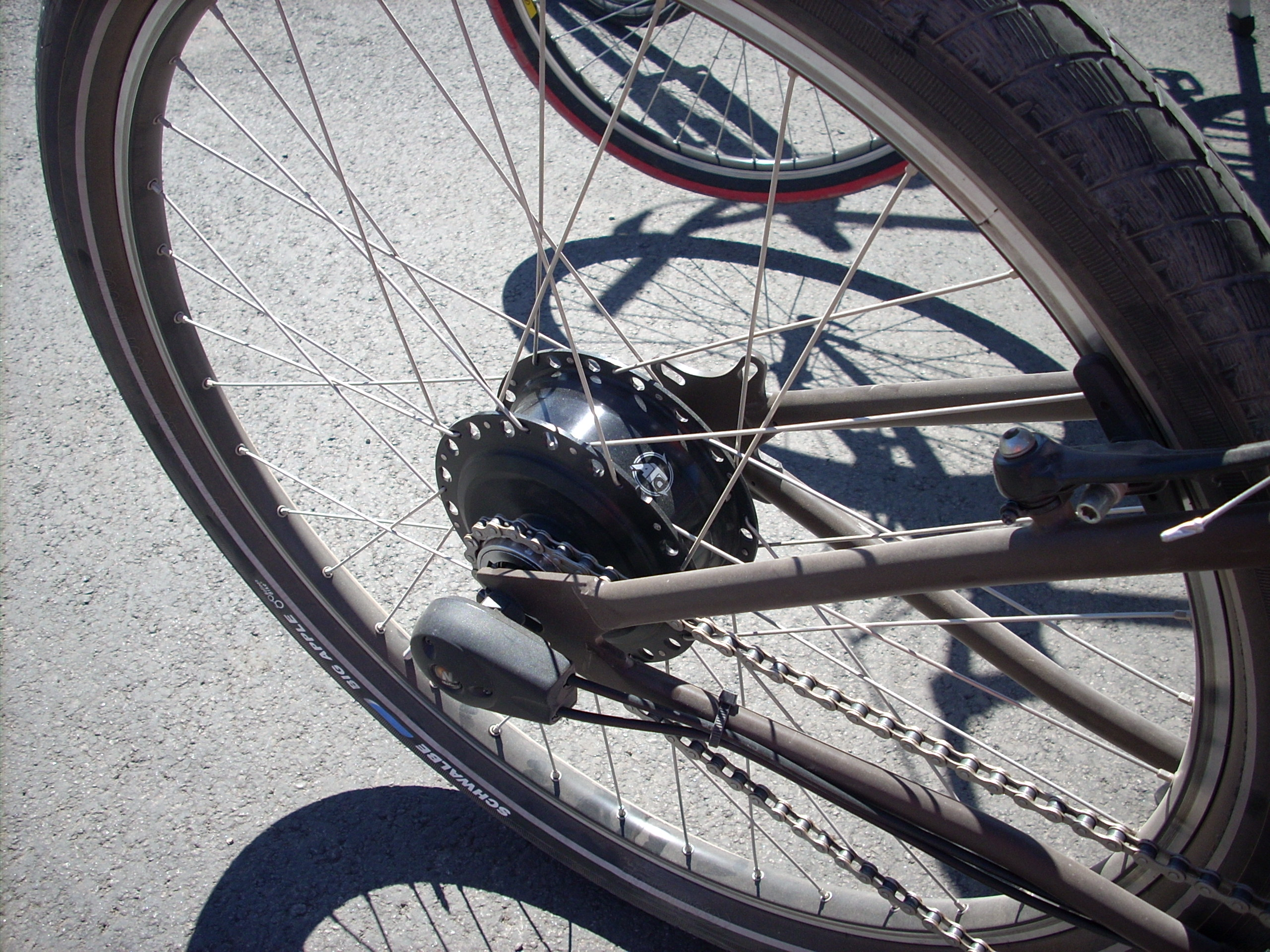
early NuVinci hub

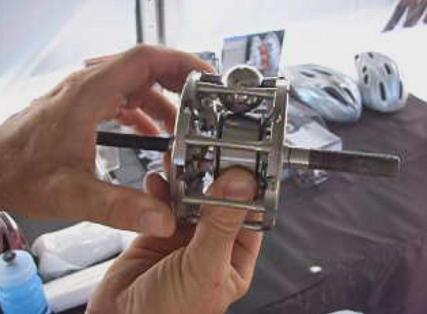
NuVinci internals

In 1995, Sachs introduced the Elan, the first hub gear with 12 speeds, and an overall range of 339%. Three years later, Rohloff came out with the Speedhub 500/14, a gear hub with 14 speeds and a range of 526%, comparable to that of a 27 speed derailleur gear system, and also sufficiently robust and lightweight for mountain biking. In 2007, NuVinci started manufacturing continuously variable transmission ("stepless") ∞-speed hubs for commuter bicycles, with an increasing range of about 380% (2016).

As of 2008, Sturmey-Archer makes 3-, 5- and 8-speed hubs, SRAM (successor to Fichtel & Sachs) make 3-, 5-, 7- and 9-speeds and Shimano make 3-, 7- and 8-speeds. In February 2010, Shimano announced the introduction of the Shimano Alfine 700, an 11-speed model.

Though most hub gear systems use one rear sprocket, SRAM's Dual Drive system combines an epicyclic hub with a multi-speed rear derailleur system to provide a wide-ranging drivetrain concentrated at the rear wheel. In 2010, Canyon presented the 1.44^{2}-concept, a hybrid hub which uses a similar epicyclical/derailleur combination.

Brompton Bicycle have their own design, with a two-speed derailleur coupled to a special three-speed wide-ratio Sturmey-Archer hub, the "BWR" (Brompton Wide Ratio). The system is useful for folding bicycles (where a multiple front chainset could foul the bike's folding mechanism), in recumbent bicycles, and cargo bikes (where small wheels and/or increased weight require a wider range of gears with smaller steps). Hub gears have in the past also been used on motorcycles, although this is now rare.

== Principle of operation ==
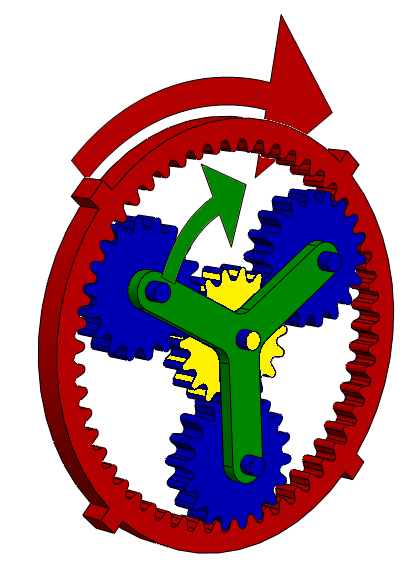
Epicyclic gears as implemented in common bicycle 3-speed gear hubs: the sun gear (yellow) is fixed, the sprocket drives either the ring gear (red) or the planet cage (green), and the hub is driven by either the ring gear (red) or the planet cage (green), depending on the gear selected.

The simplest 3-speed hubs use a single planetary epicyclic gearset. The sun gear (in yellow) is mounted solidly to the axle and is thus fixed relative to the bicycle frame.

- In low gear, the sprocket drives the annulus (in red), and the planet carrier (in green) drives the hub, giving a gear reduction.
- In middle gear, the sprocket drives the hub directly.
- In high gear, the sprocket drives the planet carrier (in green), and the annulus (in red) drives the hub, resulting in a gear increase.

The hub axle of a hub gear (unlike that of a derailleur system) will carry torque in all gears except direct drive, and so must be securely braced against rotation. While anti-rotation washers between the dropout and axle nut have often proved adequate, wider-ranging modern systems use a reaction arm affixed to the chain stay. Rear wheels with drum brakes (a feature on some commuter bicycles) require a reaction arm anyway.

Most hub gears are operated in a similar manner, with a single twist, trigger or thumb-shifter. An exception is the older style of Sturmey-Archer 5-speed, which used a second shift cable to change between close and wide-range sun gears, effectively giving two 3-speed hubs in one unit. The middle gear in both ranges was direct drive, so there were five distinct gears. They could either be controlled with a special 5-speed shifter which operated both cables, or with a regular 3-speed shifter and a friction shifter.

== Advantages ==
- Hub gears are sealed within the hub, which protects them from water, grit, and impacts. Thus hub gears usually require less maintenance and can be more reliable over time than comparable external derailleur gear systems, which may require more adjustments and replacement of parts (front chainrings, rear sprockets, narrow derailleur-chain).
- Hub gears completely avoid the danger of collision with the spokes and wheel-collapse that derailleur systems can suffer.
- Hub gears can change gear ratios when the rear wheel is not rotating. This can be useful for commuter cycling with frequent stops and for mountain biking in rough terrain.
- Hub gears can be simpler to use for inexperienced riders, because there is generally only a single shifter to operate and there are no overlapping gear ratios. By contrast, modern derailleur systems often have two shifters, and require some forethought to avoid problematic gear combinations.
- Hub gears can be manufactured to include a coaster brake (though not all hub gears are available with coaster brakes). This is not possible with derailleur systems, because the chain cannot transmit a backwards pull.
- Hub gears provide a means for shifting gear ratios on drivetrains incompatible with external derailleurs such as belt drives and shaft drives.
- The single chainline allows for a full chain enclosure chain guard, so the chain can be protected from water and grit, and clothing can be protected from contact with the lubricated chain.
- The single chainline does not require the chain to bend or twist. As a result, the chain can be constructed differently, with parallel pins instead of barrel-shaped ones. Line-contact between the bearing surfaces, instead of the point-contact of a derailleur chain, greatly extends the working life of all components.
- On bicycles with fixed chain-lines, no chain tensioner is required, eliminating a part that could otherwise become damaged in rough terrain- an advantage for off-road cyclists. Where a tensioner is required, a short cage is usually sufficient to take up the chain slack.
- The single external sprocket means that the wheel can have a hub with more distance between its flanges and be built with no or much less dish, making it laterally stronger than a similar wheel with narrower flange spacing and more dish to accommodate multiple sprockets. The hub shell of gear hubs is also often of a larger diameter than that of derailleur hubs, meaning the spokes on such wheels may be shorter.

== Disadvantages ==
- It can be hard or impossible to select another gear while pedalling, because a release of pressure is required to enable a change in this case.
- The rear wheel cannot be completely separated from a bicycle with hub gears without also disconnecting the gear cable (and any coaster-brake clamp), which complicates the process of replacing an inner tube (of course, one can still patch an innertube without removing a wheel).
- The hub gear is an integral part of the wheel and it is not possible to change the wheel without also changing the hub gear.
- Hub gears are more complex and usually more difficult for the rider to repair, which is nearly impossible by the roadside.
- Hub gears are typically more expensive than derailleur systems (note: it depends on what you are comparing them with).
- At commuter/recreational power levels, current hub gears are typically about 10% less efficient than reasonably maintained derailleur gears. (note: some marketing material from tests performed by the manufacturers has the number at 2%, but that is not only false, but impossible. Several tests compared a new internal gear hub with an old and badly-maintained derailleur system, or did not apply any weight on the axle and load into the system. The real numbers are different – the efficiency/losses are closer to that of all planetary gear transmissions.)
- Hub gears tend to be heavier than derailleur systems with equivalent gearing characteristics, and the additional weight is concentrated at the back wheel. For this reason, they are not a primary choice for rear-suspension bicycles in sporting use as the extra unsprung weight may adversely affect traction and braking.
- Hub gears are generally incompatible with quick release mechanisms/skewer axles.
- It is sometimes possible to select no gear when changing gears with a poorly adjusted gear cable, which results in a complete loss of drive.

== Hub gears in everyday use ==
Traditional hub gears are indexed at the shifter, making operation dependent on correct cable tension (and lubrication thereof). In practice, gear-jumping and consequent internal damage are unusual, except in high-mileage units. Modern hub gear-units incorporate the indexing within the unit and are, therefore, unaffected by shifting malfunctions caused in this way.

Most Sturmey-Archer and Fichtel & Sachs "Torpedo" systems default to top gear at slack-cable, which could make the bicycle usable for long-distance travel in flat terrain, even if a fault developed in the change mechanism. It is rather like a derailleur system, which can be manually set to a high gear in case of a similar fault. The very earliest Sturmey-Archer hubs, however, defaulted to low gear. Some modern hub gear systems, e.g., 7-speed Shimano, also default to bottom gear and are thus more dependent on the cable-pull.

== Hybrid gearing with derailleurs ==
Some systems combine internally geared hubs with external derailleurs. A freewheeling hub with a sprocket suitable for narrow chain can be combined with a double or triple crankset and front derailleur, in order to provide a wider range and closer gear ratio spacing. A chain tensioner or a rear derailleur is needed to take up chain slack, and care is needed not to over-torque the hub by using too small a chainring/sprocket ratio.

Alternatively, some hubs can accept two dished drive sprockets, between which the rider can switch with a rear derailleur. Careful sprocket selection can allow the available gear ratios when using one sprocket to fall half-way between those available when using the second sprocket, providing half-step gearing, as on the Brompton 6-speed folding bicycle. This concept is used and extended in the SRAM Dual Drive system, where a conventional multi-speed cassette is mounted to a 3-speed hub. A similar version of the ever-popular AW hub is manufactured by Sturmey Archer. This system may be useful on bicycles which cannot accept a front derailleur. The German company Canyon introduced the 144^{2} in 2010, a hybrid hub which uses a similar epicyclical/derailleur combination.

When both front and rear derailleurs are used with a geared hub, the result is a very wide-ranging drivetrain, at the expense of increased weight and complexity.

A particular use of the dualdrive systems is on recumbent bicycles where starting off from a standstill, or after braking hard, is very difficult if a high gear is engaged. On an upright bicycle, if a high gear is engaged, the rider may use one leg to gain minimal momentum and stand on the pedals and use their upper body to balance the bike; this is not possible on a 2-wheeled recumbent bicycle. Here the dualdrive setup allows shifting at a standstill or at low speeds, which is not possible with derailleur gears alone.

== Advanced hub gears ==
Advanced hub gears offer a higher number of gears by using multiple epicyclic gears driven by each other. Their ratios are chosen to give more evenly spaced gears and a larger total gear range. The operating principle of such units is the same as with less advanced systems, with a trigger or twist shifter with sequential shifting.

- The 12-speed Sachs Elan was the first hub gear with 10 or more speeds in the market (1995–1999). It was considered heavy and plagued with quality issues, and was discontinued after a few years.
- The 14-speed Rohloff Speedhub hub gear, introduced in 1998, has a range exceeding 5 to 1, and is thus comparable in range to 24, 27 and 30-speed derailleur systems (with 3×8, 3×9 and 3×10 cogs front and rear), since the latter have three overlapping ranges often with only about 14 distinct gears. As there is no overlap with the Speedhub, the hub gear has only two shift directions (up and down), compared to front and rear derailleur gears where two shift operators with two shift directions are needed to shift through all gears.
- The 11-speed Shimano Alfine 700 hub gear, introduced in 2010, has a gear range exceeding 4 to 1, comparable to 20-speed derailleur drive-trains, and internals running in an oil bath, for greater mechanical efficiency.

== Gallery ==
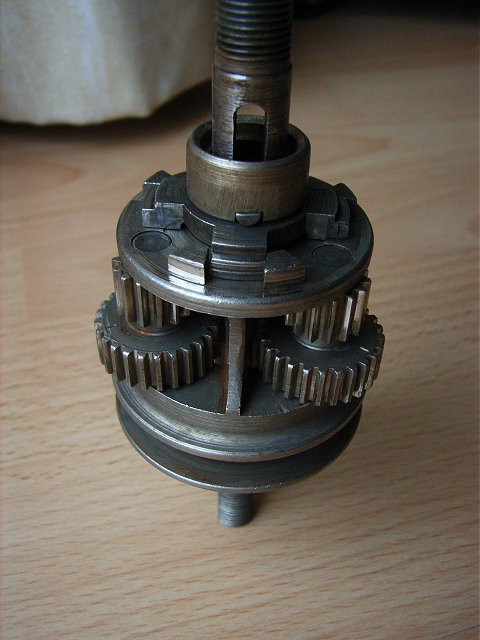
A Sturmey-Archer AM bicycle hub gear mechanism with the ring gear removed to show the compound (stepped) planet gears.

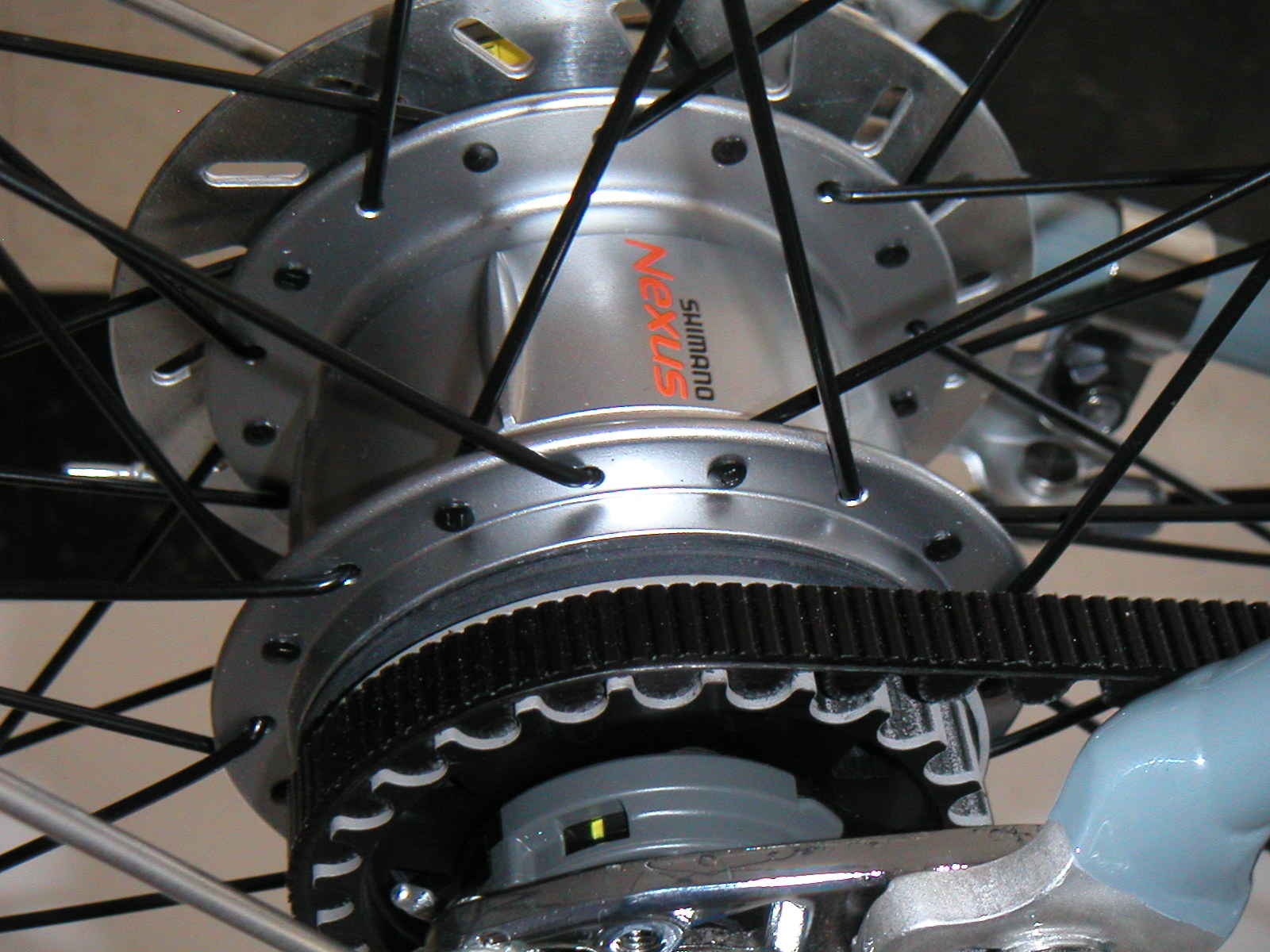
This belt-drive on a Trek Soho is fitted with a sprocket too.

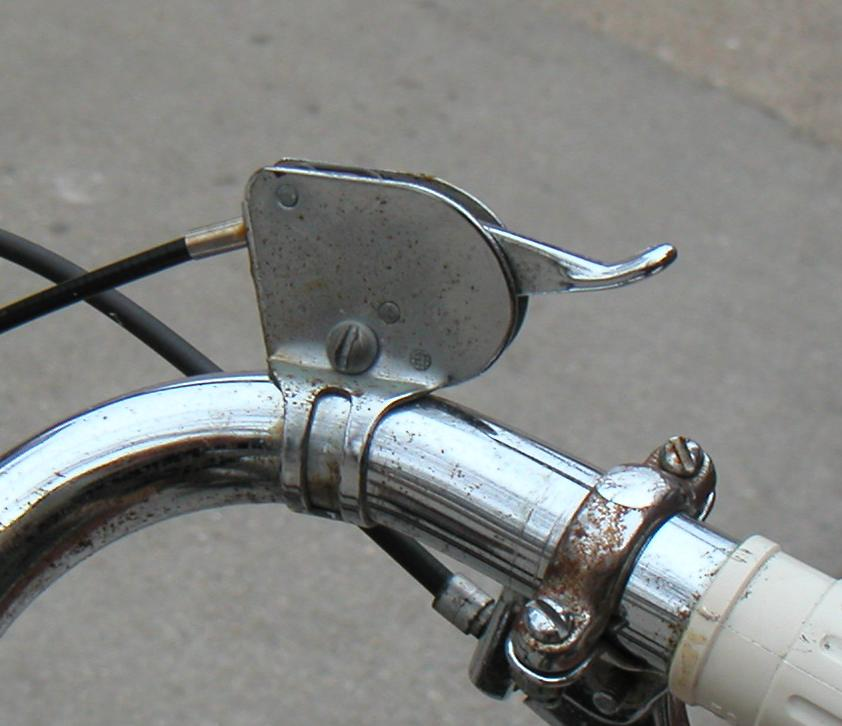
Traditional 3-speed thumb-lever shifter, this is a Sturmey Archer shifter made between 1967 and 1975, it is missing its clear plastic applique which displays the gear selected and the manufacturer's branding.

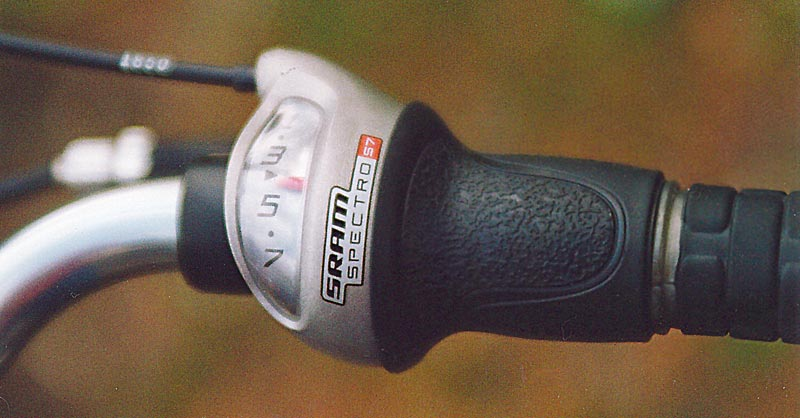
A modern SRAM Spectro S7 twist-style seven-speed indexed shifter uses the same bowden cable as the older lever.

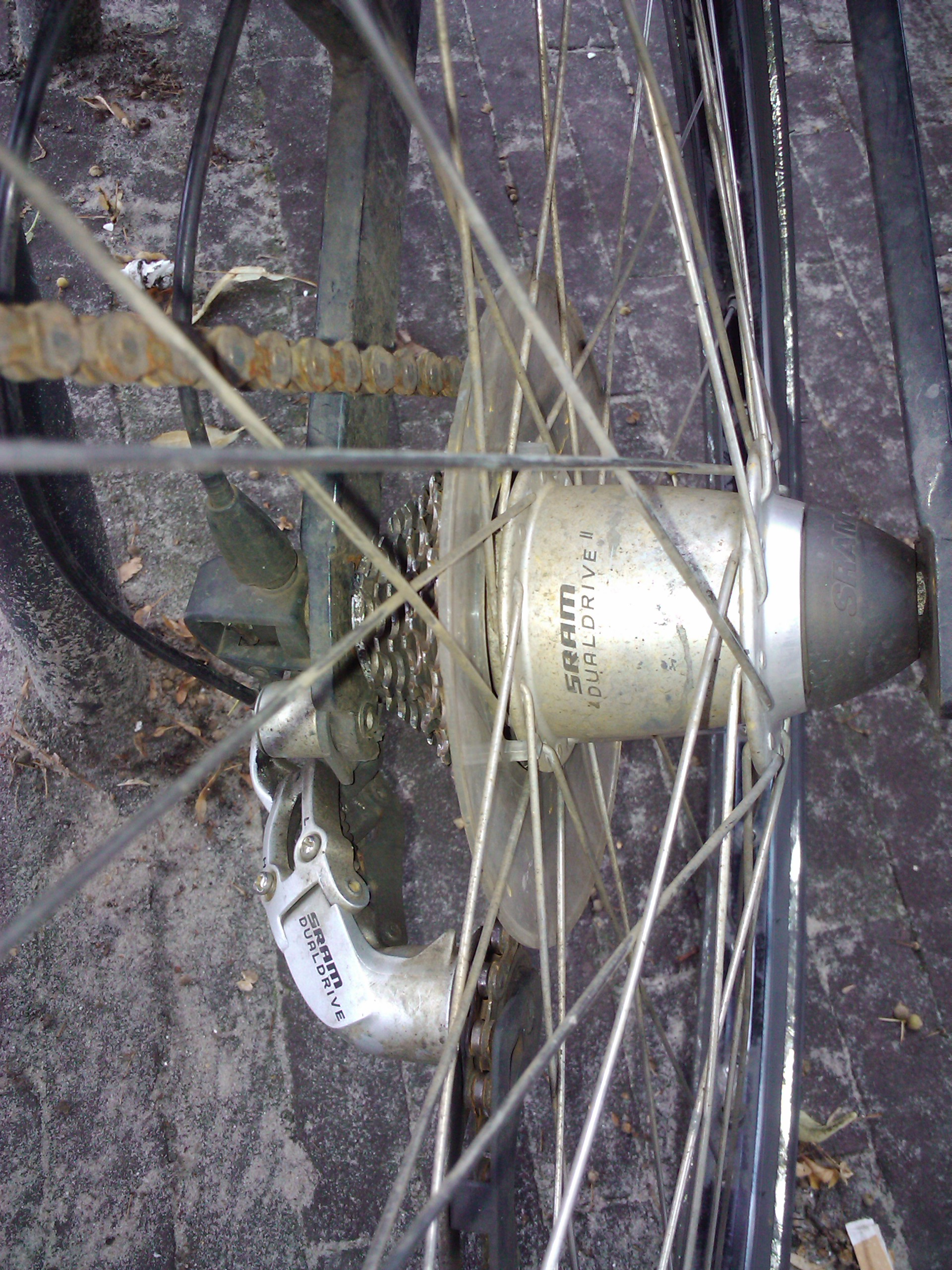
SRAM Dual Drive combination derailleur gears and hub gear

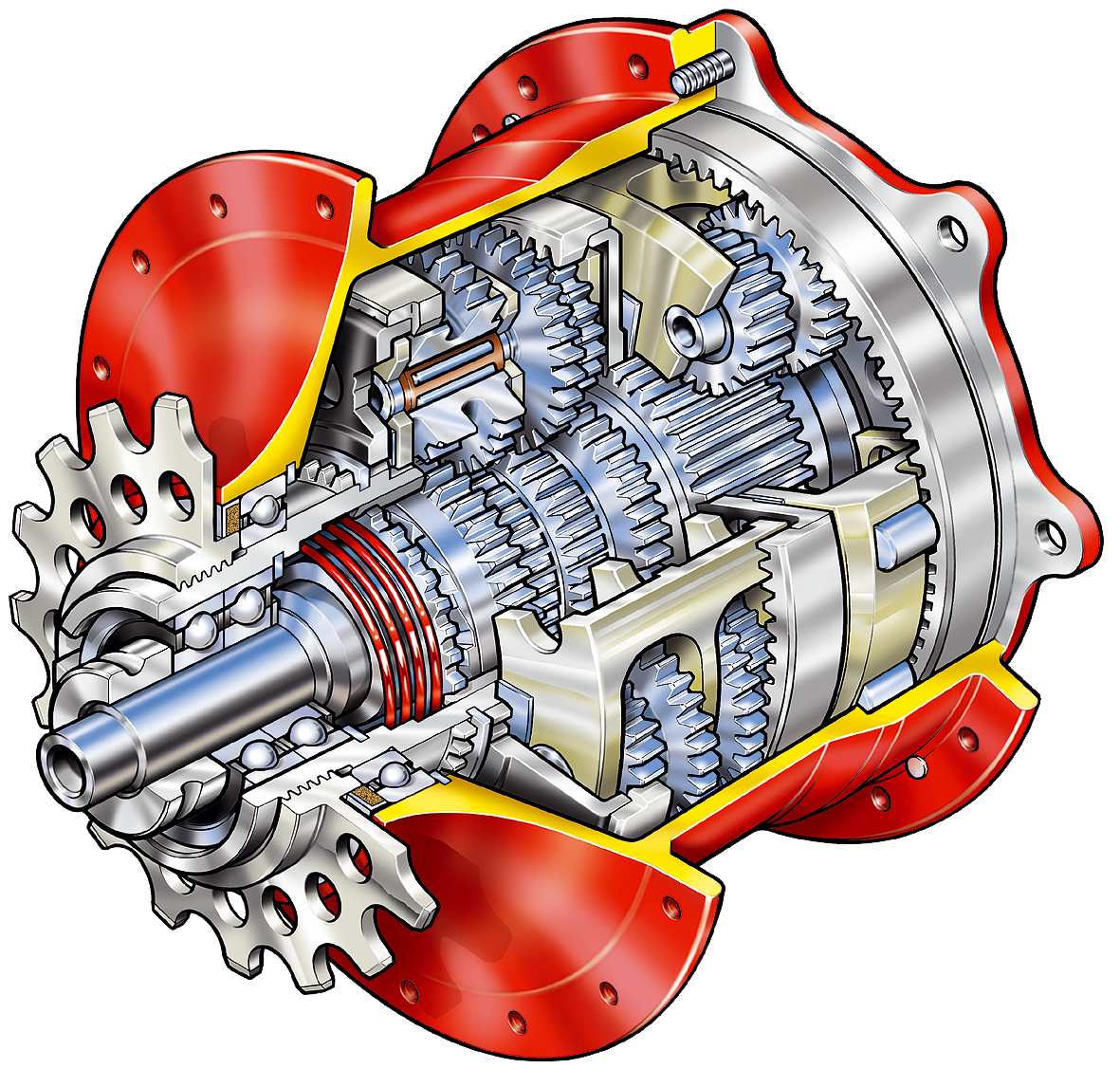
14-speed hub cutaway diagram

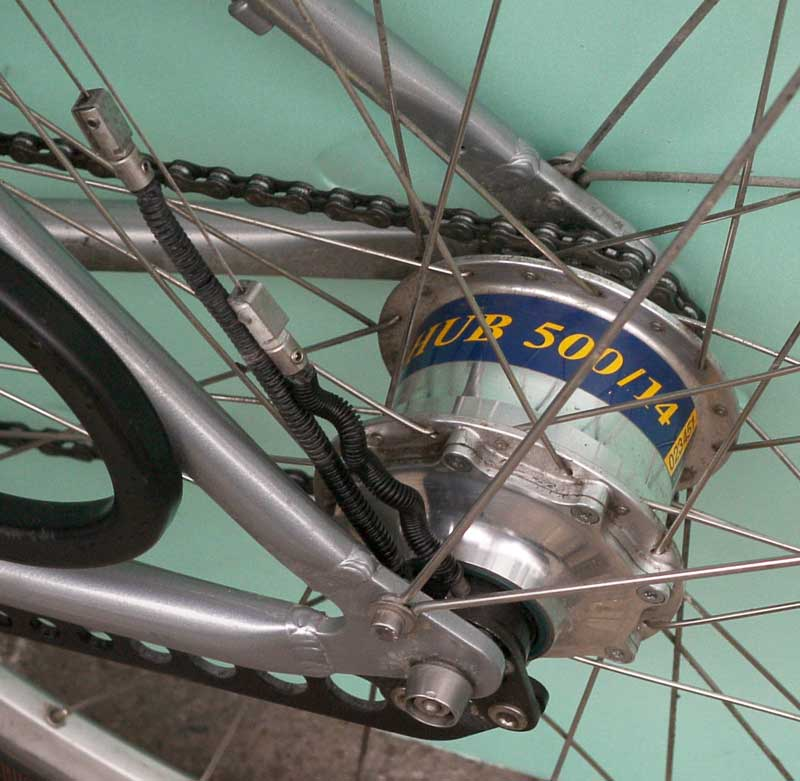
Rohloff 14-speed internally geared rear hub

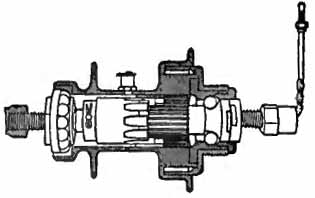
Diagram of a two-speed gear hub.

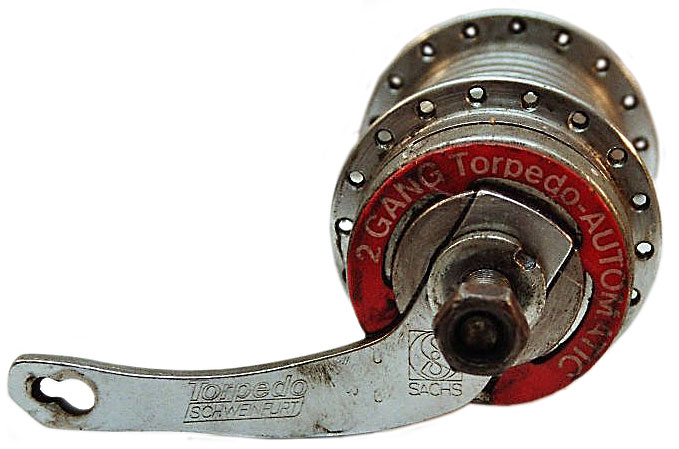
Fichtel & Sachs automatically switching two-speed gear hub.

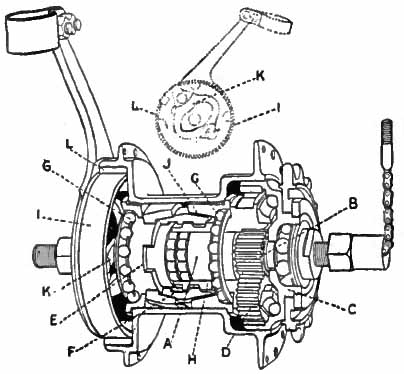
Cross-sectional diagram of an Eadie two-speed coaster-brake gear hub.

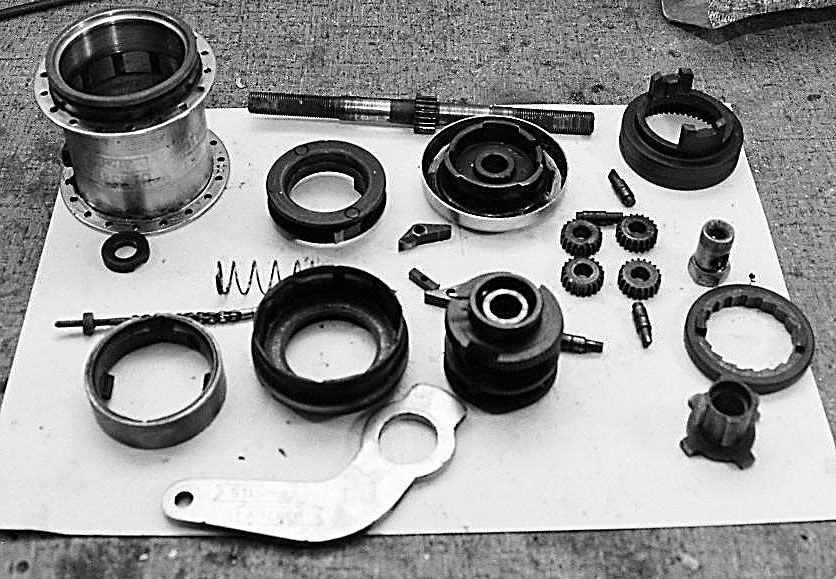
Disassembled tricoaster gear/brake hub. The sun gear is attached to the middle of the axle which lies across the top center, the four planet gears are arranged in a square to the right of the center, and the ring gear is to the upper right of them.

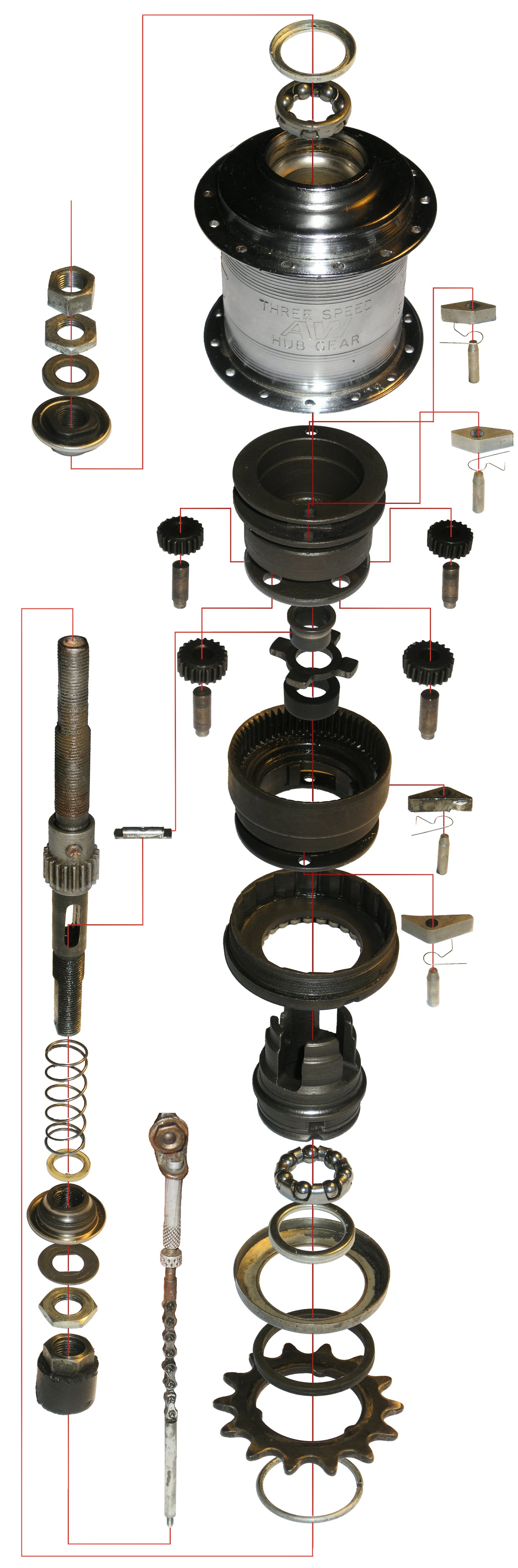
Exploded view of a Sturmey Archer three-speed gear hub.

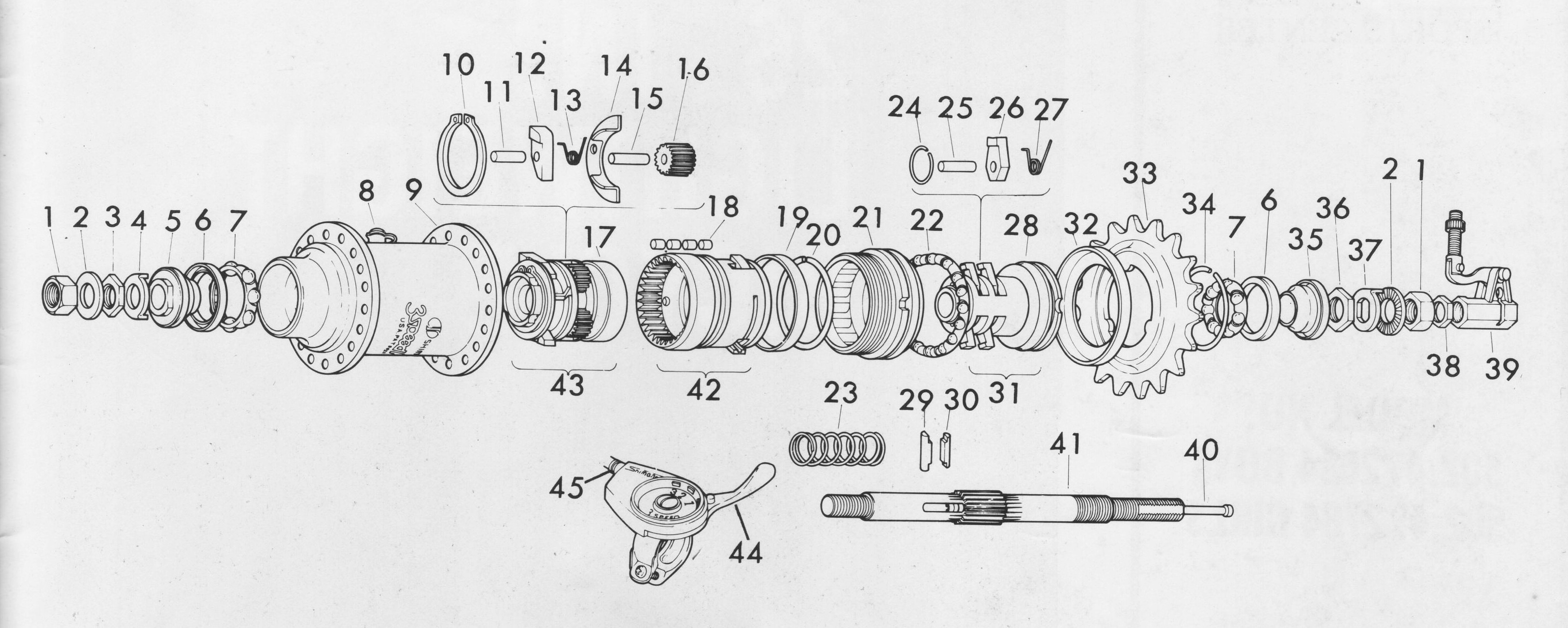
Shimano three-speed gear hub.

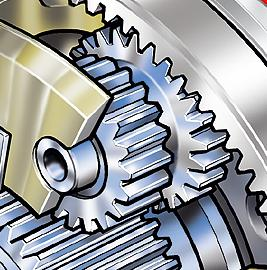
Rohloff 14-speed stepped reduction planetary gear series.

== Manufacturers ==
- Bendix: From 1950s to 1970s, produced the two-speed "Kickback" hub
- Fichtel & Sachs
- Rohloff
- Schlumpf
- Shimano
- SRAM
- Sturmey-Archer
- Kindernay

== See also ==
- Bicycle drivetrain systems
- Comparison of hub gears
- Gear inches
- Gearbox bicycle
- Outline of cycling
