= KMC Chain Industrial =

Taiwanese roller chain manufacturer

KMC Chain Industrial Co., Ltd.
- Industry: roller chain, bicycle chain
- Founded: 1977; 49 years ago, Taiwan
- Products: Roller chains for bicycles, motorcycles, and industry
- Revenue: 250 million USD
- Operating income: unknown
- Net income: unknown
- Number of employees: 4,500
- Website: www.kmcchain.com

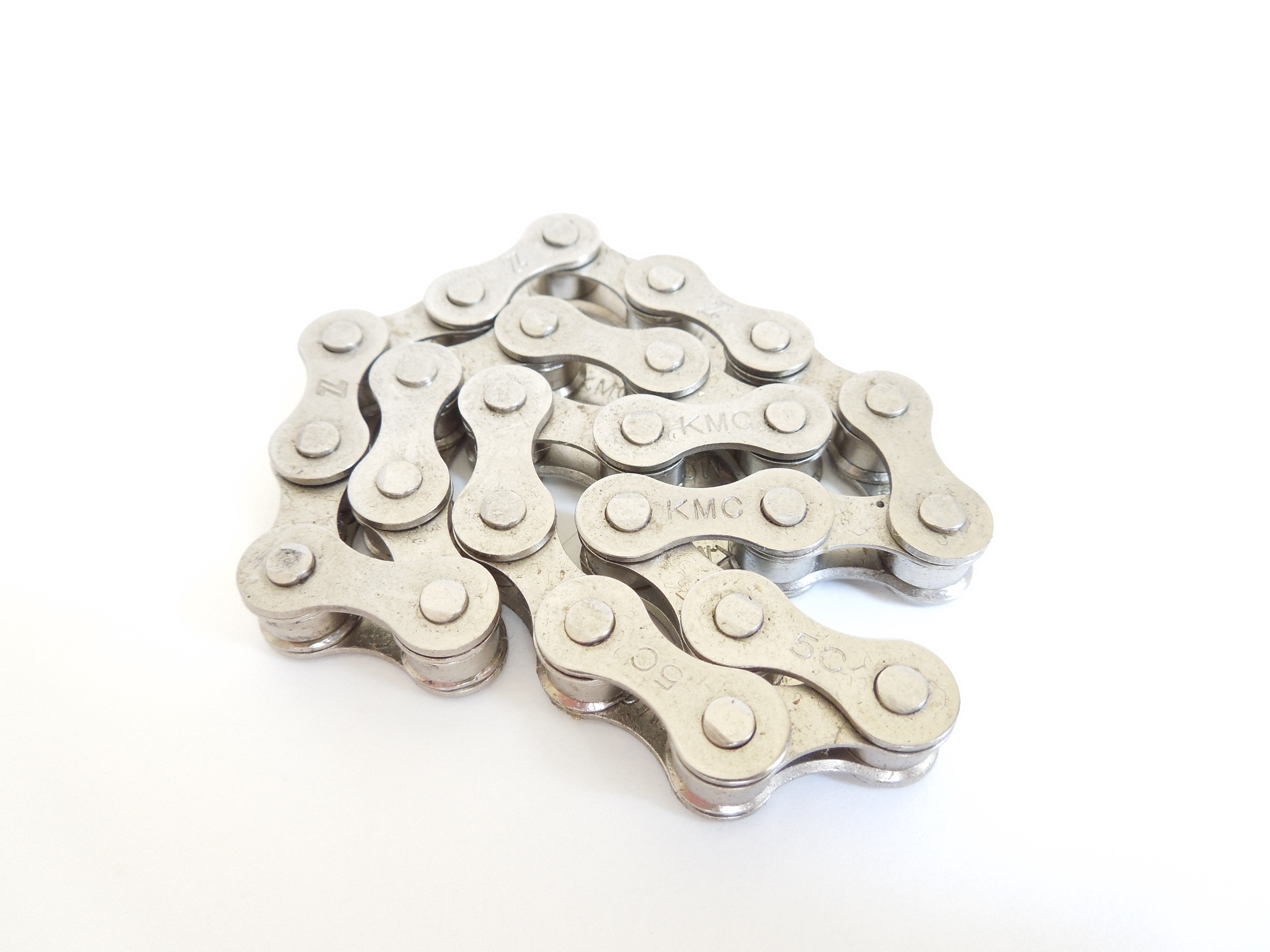
A small section of KMC bicycle chain

KMC Chain Industrial Co., Ltd. is a roller chain manufacturer headquartered in Taiwan, R.O.C. with corporate entities in the US, Continental Chain Company, and Europe, KMC Chain Europe BV. They make cam driving chains, balance driving chains, oil pump chains, motorcycle chains, and industrial chains. They manufacture and market bicycle chains and master links under their own KMC brand and supply them to others, including Shimano. KMC chains are used in the Tour de France by riders such as Gustav Larsson, Swedish time trial champion. KMC was founded by Charles Wu as Kuei Meng Industrial Co. in 1977, and was the largest bicycle chain manufacturer in the world in 2011.

== Compatibility ==
They are known for working well with Shimano, SRAM, and Campagnolo drivetrains. Bicycle manufacturers, such as Specialized Bicycle Components provide KMC chains on new bicycles with SRAM and Shimano components. 2013 Bianchi team bicycles include a KMC X11SL chain on a Campagnolo Super Record EPS electronic transmission.

== Varieties ==
KMC makes bicycle chains with roller widths of 3/16, 1/8, 3/32, 11/128 inches and with external widths compatible with single-speed, 6, 7, 8, 9, 10, 11 and 12-speed drivetrains. They offer chains with hollow pins and with cut-outs in the links and made of stainless steel, with a titanium nitride coating, or painted in a variety of colors. In 2012, KMC launched a chain model specifically for electric bicycles. In 2010, KMC won the iF Product Design Gold Award for its BMX ‘Kool Knight Chain’.

== See also ==
- List of companies of Taiwan

Other notable bicycle chain manufacturers include:

- Campagnolo
- Rohloff AG
- Shimano
- SRAM
- Wippermann
