= Skip-link chain =

Obsolete roller chain for bicycles

Skip-link chain is an obsolete roller chain for bicycles in which side plates are alternately short and long, and so rollers are alternately close together and far apart.

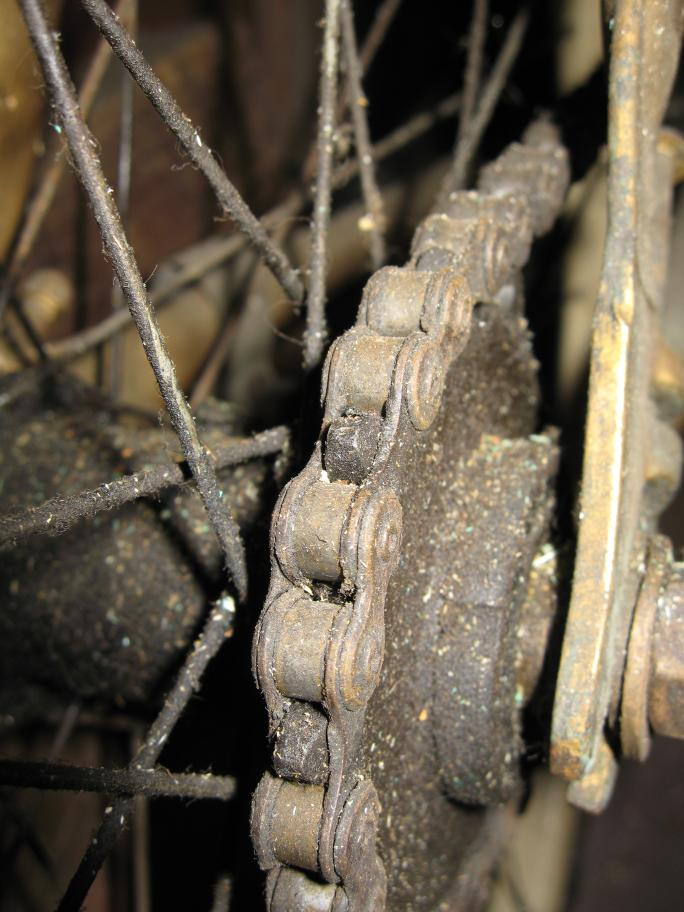
A skip-link chain running over the rear sprocket on a bicycle.

In bicycle chains, skip-link chain has the same one-inch spacing as the earlier block chain. Due to the asymmetry, the rollers fit over long teeth used with earlier block chain, but due to the use of rollers, efficiency is better than block chain. Skip-link chain is typically arranged with the long plates also the wide-spaced outer plates, which mimics the visual effect of block chain. Since sprocket teeth run on rollers, they cannot be usefully wider than the width of the narrow-spaced links, so the tooth can be no wider than with a symmetrical chain. Thus, skip-link chain spreads wear over half the number of teeth and has worse sprocket durability than a symmetrical roller chain. Chain wear is dominated by wear between pins and bushings, and this is the same as a modern roller chain.

Skip-link chain is specific to bicycles and is not otherwise widely used. Skip link chain became obsolete sometime in the 1950s because roller chain was becoming more widely used in the manufacturing of bicycles.
