= Wippermann =

German roller chain manufacturer

Wippermann jr GmbH
- Industry: roller chain, bicycle chain
- Founded: 1893, Germany
- Products: Roller chains for bicycles, mopeds, and industry
- Revenue: unknown
- Operating income: unknown
- Net income: unknown
- Number of employees: ~ 400
- Website: www.wippermann.com

Wippermann jr GmbH is a German roller chain manufacturer located in Hagen, North Rhine-Westphalia, and founded by Wilhelm Wippermann in 1893. They make the Connex brand of bicycle chains and master links. Their bicycle chains include such high-end features as nickel-plating, hollow pins, stainless steel, titanium rollers, and cutout plates. In 2008, Wippermann published wear test results in which their bicycle chains performed well. Wippermann chains are used by professional cyclists in the Tour de France.

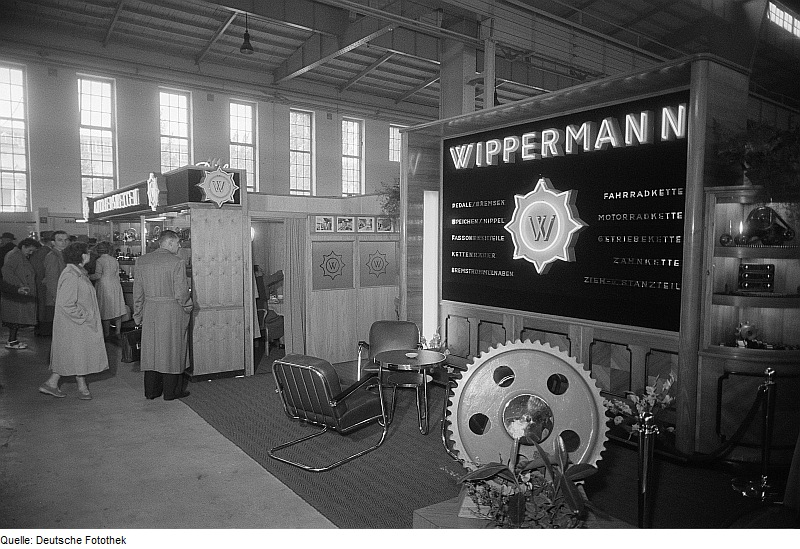
Wippermann at Leipzig Trade Fair 1954

== See also ==
Other notable bicycle chain manufacturers include:

- Campagnolo
- Rohloff AG
- TAYA Chain
- KMC Chain
- Shimano
- SRAM

https://primamonza.it/attualita/quando-a-macherio-cera-la-wippermann/
