= Chain drive =

Way of transmitting mechanical power

Roller chain and sprocket

A chain drive is a way of transmitting mechanical power from one place to another. It is often used to convey power to the wheels of a vehicle, particularly bicycles and motorcycles. It is also used in a wide variety of machines besides vehicles.

Most often, the power is conveyed by a roller chain, known as the drive chain or transmission chain, passing over a sprocket, with the teeth of the gear meshing with the holes in the links of the chain. The gear is turned, and this pulls the chain putting mechanical force into the system. Another type of drive chain is the Morse chain, invented by the Morse Chain Company of Ithaca, New York, United States. This has inverted teeth.

Sometimes the power is output by simply rotating the chain, which can be used to lift or drag objects. In other situations, a second gear is placed and the power is recovered by attaching shafts or hubs to this gear. Though drive chains are often simple oval loops, they can also go around corners by placing more than two gears along the chain; gears that do not put power into the system or transmit it out are generally known as idler-wheels. By varying the diameter of the input and output gears with respect to each other, the gear ratio can be altered. For example, when the bicycle pedals' gear rotates once, it causes the gear that drives the wheels to rotate more than one revolution. Duplex chains are another type of chain which are essentially two chains joined side by side which allow for more power and torque to be transmitted.

== History ==
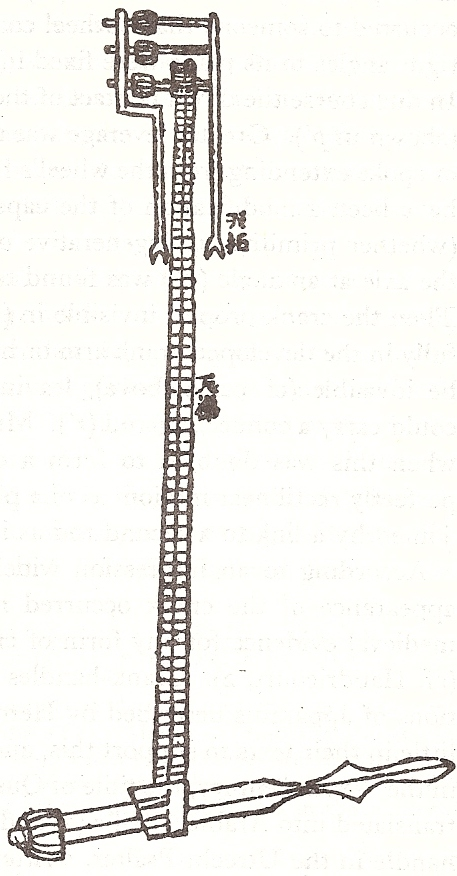
The oldest known illustration of an endless power-transmitting chain drive, from Su Song's book of 1092 AD, describing his clock tower of Kaifeng

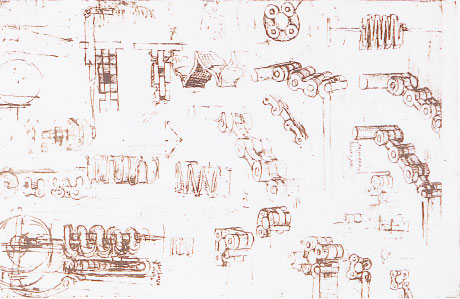
Sketch of pin-jointed chain by Leonardo da Vinci

The oldest known application of a chain drive appears in the Polybolos, described by the Greek engineer Philon of Byzantium (3rd century BC). Two flat-linked chains were connected to a windlass, which by winding back and forth would automatically fire the machine's arrows until its magazine was empty. Although the device did not transmit power continuously since the chains "did not transmit power from shaft to shaft, and hence they were not in the direct line of ancestry of the chain-drive proper", the Greek design marks the beginning of the history of the chain drive since "no earlier instance of such a cam is known, and none as complex is known until the 16th century." It is here that the flat-link chain, often attributed to Leonardo da Vinci, actually made its first appearance."

The first continuous as well as the first endless chain drive was originally depicted in the written horological treatise of the Song dynasty by the medieval Chinese polymath mathematician and astronomer Su Song (1020–1101 AD), who used it to operate the armillary sphere of his astronomical clock tower, which is the first astronomical clock, as well as the clock jack figurines presenting the time of day by mechanically banging gongs and drums. The chain drive itself converted rotary to reclinear motion and was given power via the hydraulic works of Su's water clock tank and waterwheel, the latter which acted as a large gear.

== Alternatives ==
=== Belt drive ===
Most chain drive systems use teeth to transfer motion between the chain and the rollers. This results in lower frictional losses than belt drive systems, which often rely on friction to transfer motion.

Although chains can be made stronger than belts, their greater mass increases drive train inertia.

Drive chains are most often made of metal, while belts are often rubber, plastic, urethane, or other substances. If the drive chain is heavier than an equivalent drive belt, the system will have a higher inertia. Theoretically, this can lead to a greater flywheel effect, however in practice the belt or chain inertia often makes up a small proportion of the overall drivetrain inertia.

One problem with roller chains is the variation in speed, or surging, caused by the acceleration and deceleration of the chain as it goes around the sprocket link by link. It starts as soon as the pitch line of the chain contacts the first tooth of the sprocket. This contact occurs at a point below the pitch circle of the sprocket. As the sprocket rotates, the chain is raised up to the pitch circle and is then dropped down again as sprocket rotation continues. Because of the fixed pitch length, the pitch line of the link cuts across the chord between two pitch points on the sprocket, remaining in this position relative to the sprocket until the link exits the sprocket. This rising and falling of the pitch line is what causes chordal effect or speed variation.

In other words, conventional roller chain drives suffer the potential for vibration, as the effective radius of action in a chain and sprocket combination constantly changes during revolution ("Chordal action"). If the chain moves at constant speed, then the shafts must accelerate and decelerate constantly. If one sprocket rotates at a constant speed, then the chain (and probably all other sprockets that it drives) must accelerate and decelerate constantly. This is usually not an issue with many drive systems; however, most motorcycles are fitted with a rubber bushed rear wheel hub to virtually eliminate this vibration issue. Toothed belt drives are designed to limit this issue by operating at a constant pitch radius).

Chains are often narrower than belts, and this can make it easier to shift them to larger or smaller gears in order to vary the gear ratio. Multi-speed bicycles with derailleurs make use of this. Also, the more positive meshing of a chain can make it easier to build gears that can increase or shrink in diameter, again altering the gear ratio. However, some newer synchronous belts claim to have "equivalent capacity to roller chain drives in the same width".

Both can be used to move objects by attaching pockets, buckets, or frames to them; chains are often used to move things vertically by holding them in frames, as in industrial toasters, while belts are good at moving things horizontally in the form of conveyor belts. It is not unusual for the systems to be used in combination; for example the rollers that drive conveyor belts are themselves often driven by drive chains.

=== Drive shafts ===
Drive shafts are another common method used to move mechanical power around that is sometimes evaluated in comparison to chain drive; in particular belt drive vs chain drive vs shaft drive is a key design decision for most motorcycles. Drive shafts tend to be tougher and more reliable than chain drive, but the bevel gears have far more friction than a chain. For this reason virtually all high-performance motorcycles use chain drive, with shaft-driven arrangements generally used for non-sporting machines. Toothed-belt drives are used for some (non-sporting) models.

== Use in vehicles ==
=== Bicycles ===
Chain drive was the main feature which differentiated the safety bicycle introduced in 1885, with its two equal-sized wheels, from the direct-drive penny-farthing or "high wheeler" type of bicycle. The popularity of the chain-driven safety bicycle brought about the demise of the penny-farthing, and is still a basic feature of bicycle design today.

=== Automobiles ===
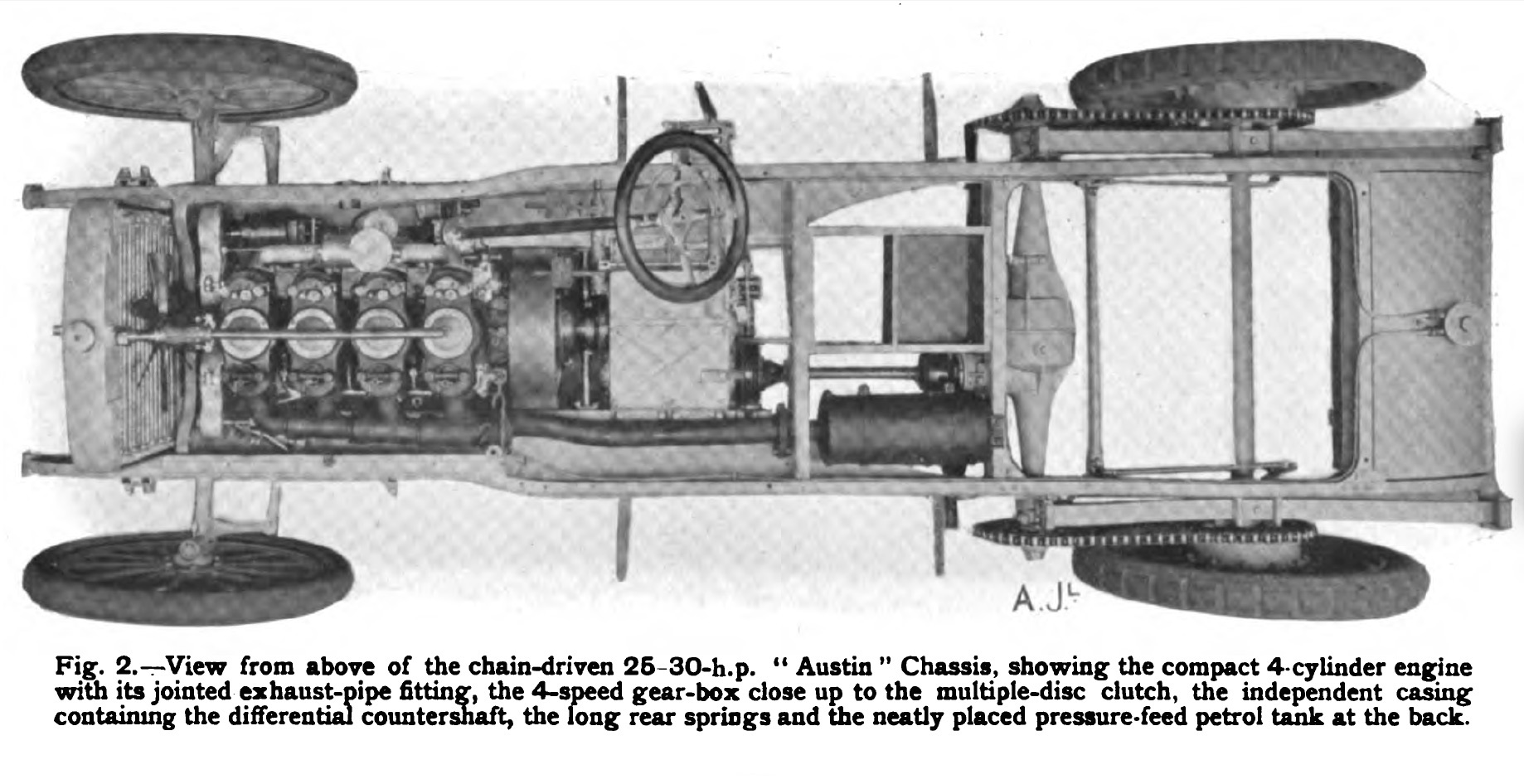
1906 Austin- plan view

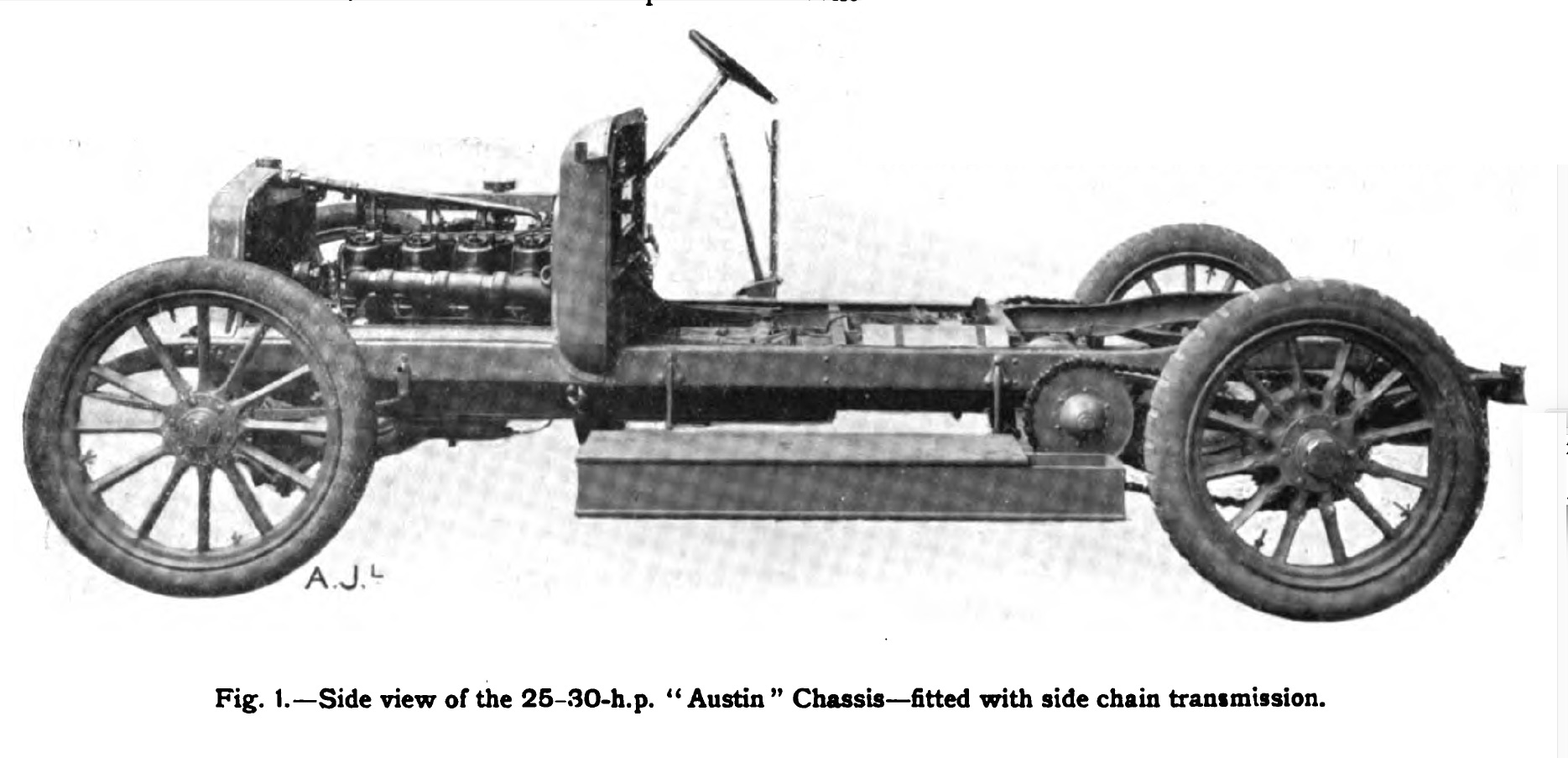
1906 Austin- side view

Many early cars used a chain drive system, which was a popular alternative to the Système Panhard. A common design was using a differential located near the centre of the car, which then transferred drive to the rear axle via roller chains. This system allowed for a relatively simple design which could accommodate the vertical axle movement associated with the rear suspension system.

Frazer Nash were strong proponents of this system using one chain per gear selected by dog clutches. Their chain drive system, (designed for the GN Cyclecar Company) was very effective, allowing for fast gear selections. This system was used in many racing cars of the 1920s and 1930s. The last popular chain drive automobile was the Honda S600 of the 1960s.

=== Motorcycles ===
Chain drive versus belt drive or use of a driveshaft is a fundamental design decision in motorcycle design; nearly all motorcycles use one of these three designs.

== See also ==
- Bicycle chain
- Chain pump
- Chainsaw
- Gear
- Rolling mills

== Bibliography ==
- Oberg, Erik; Jones, Franklin D.; Horton, Holbrook L.; Ryffel, Henry H. (1996), Green, Robert E.; McCauley, Christopher J. (eds.), Machinery's Handbook (25th ed.), New York: Industrial Press, ISBN 978-0-8311-2575-2, OCLC 473691581.
- Needham, Joseph (1986). Science and Civilization in China: Volume 4, Chemistry and Chemical Technology, Part 2, Mechanical Engineering. Taipei: Caves Books Ltd.
- Sclater, Neil. (2011). "Chain and belt devices and mechanisms." Mechanisms and Mechanical Devices Sourcebook. 5th ed. New York: McGraw Hill. pp. 262–277. ISBN 9780071704427. Drawings and designs of various drives.
