= Blockchain (disambiguation) =

Blockchain is a sequential distributed database used in cryptocurrencies.

Blockchain or block chain may also refer to:

- Blockchain.com, a bitcoin exchange, wallet, and explorer service
- Cipher Block Chaining, a block cipher mode of operation in cryptography
- Blockchain, a 2021 mixtape by Money Man
- Bar-link chain, a kind of mechanical drive chain also known as a block chain
