= Timing belt (disambiguation) =

Timing belt may refer to:

- Timing belt (camshaft), a component used to synchronize the rotation of a crankshaft and camshaft
- Timing belt, or toothed belt, a flexible belt with teeth moulded onto its inner surface
