= Bicycle chain =

Roller chain that transfers power from the pedals to the drive-wheel of a bicycle

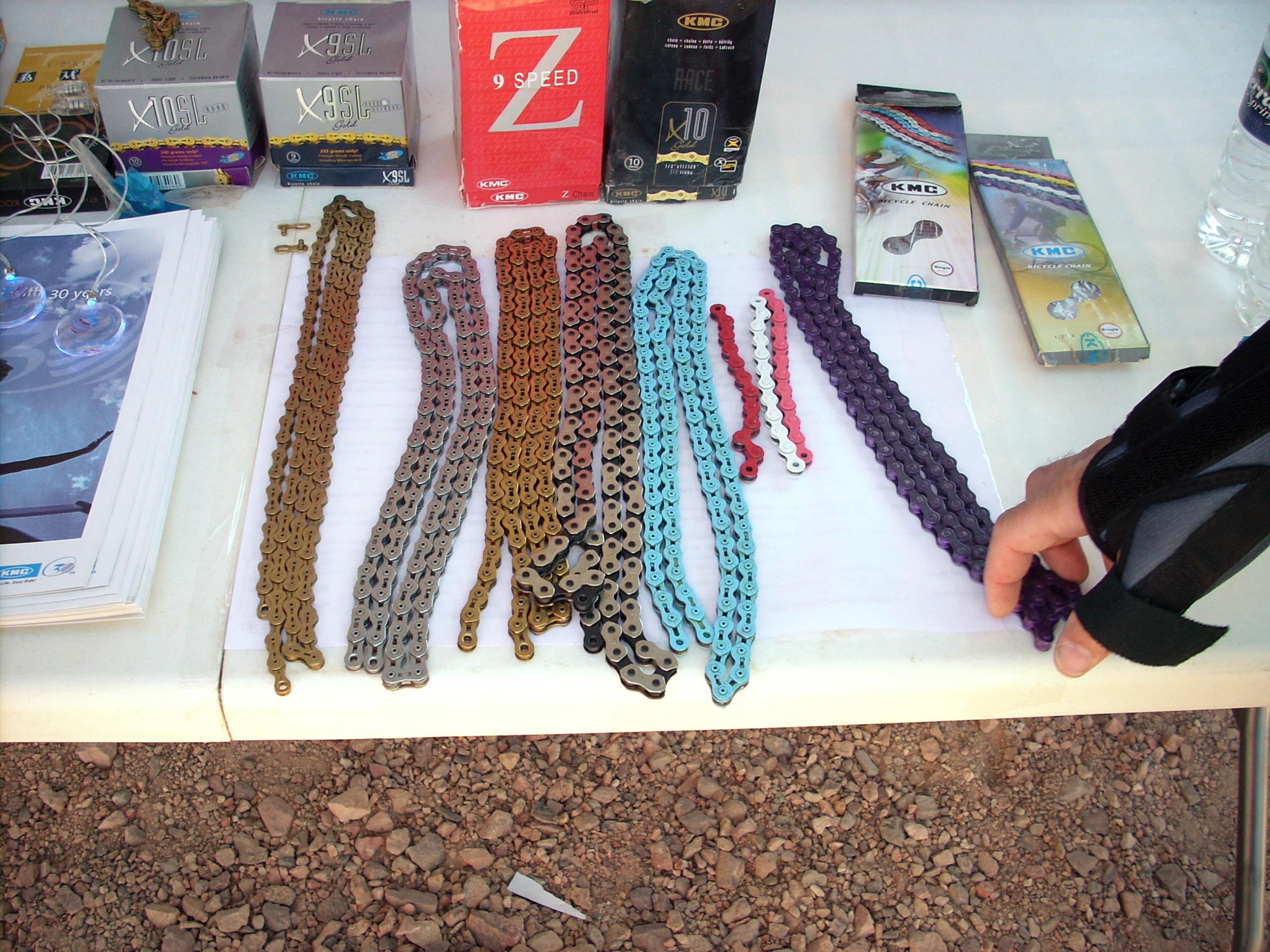
Bicycle chains

Roller chain and sprocket

A bicycle chain is a roller chain that transfers power from the pedals to the drive-wheel of a bicycle, thus propelling it. Most bicycle chains are made from plain carbon or alloy steel, but some are nickel-plated to prevent rust, or simply for aesthetics.

== History ==
Obsolete chain designs previously used on bicycles included the block chain, the skip-link chain, and the Simpson lever chain. The first chains were of a simple, bushing-less design. These had inherent reliability problems and a bit more friction (and mechanical efficiency losses) than modern chains. With these limitations in mind, the Nevoigt brothers, of the German Diamant Bicycle Company, designed the roller chain in 1898, which uses bushings. More recently, the "bushingless roller chain" design has superseded the bushed chain. This design incorporates the bearing surface of the bushing into the inner side plate, with each plate creating half of the bushing. This reduces the number of parts needed to assemble the chain and reduces cost. The chain is also more flexible sideways, which is needed for modern derailleur gearing, because the chainline is not always straight in all gear selections.

The first solid bush-roller patent was filed by the Renold Chain company in 1880.

Early examples of chain-driven bicycles include the 1869 Guillemot and Meyer, the 1879 Lawson, the 1884 McCammon, the 1884 Starley Rover, and the 1895 Diamant.

Before the safety bicycle, bicycles did not have chains and the pedals were typically attached directly to the drive-wheel, thus limiting top speed by the diameter of the wheel and resulting in designs with front wheels as large as possible. Various linkage mechanisms were invented to raise the effective gear ratio, but with limited success. Using chain drive allowed the mechanical advantage between the drive and driven sprockets to determine the maximum speed, thereby enabling manufacturers to reduce the size of the driving wheel for safety. It also allowed for the development of variable gearing, allowing cyclists to adjust their gearing on the fly, to terrain or road inclination and their strength, obtaining an efficient and workable cadence at various speeds.

== Efficiency ==
A bicycle chain can be very energy efficient: one study reported efficiencies as high as 98.6%. The study, performed in a clean laboratory environment, found that efficiency was not greatly affected by the state of lubrication. A larger sprocket will give a more efficient drive because it moves the point of pressure farther away from the axle, placing less stress on the bearings, thus reducing friction in the inner wheel. Higher chain tension was found to be more efficient: "This is actually not in the direction you'd expect, based simply on friction".

== Maintenance ==
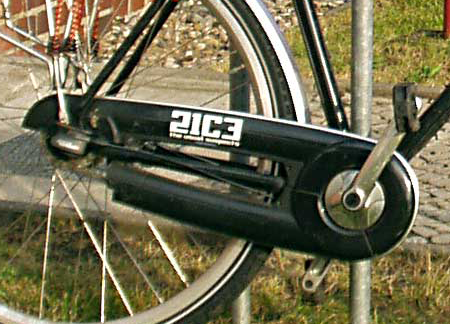
A city bicycle's chain protected by a chain case

Chains should be regularly cleaned and lubricated, and should be cleaned before lubrication. The cardinal rule for long chain life is never to lubricate a dirty chain, as this washes abrasive particles into the rollers.

An alternative approach is to change the (relatively cheap) chain very frequently; then proper care is less important. Some utility bicycles have fully enclosing chain guards, which virtually eliminate chain wear and maintenance. On recumbent bicycles the chain is often run through tubes to prevent it from picking up dirt, and to keep the cyclist's leg free from oil and dirt.

=== Lubrication ===
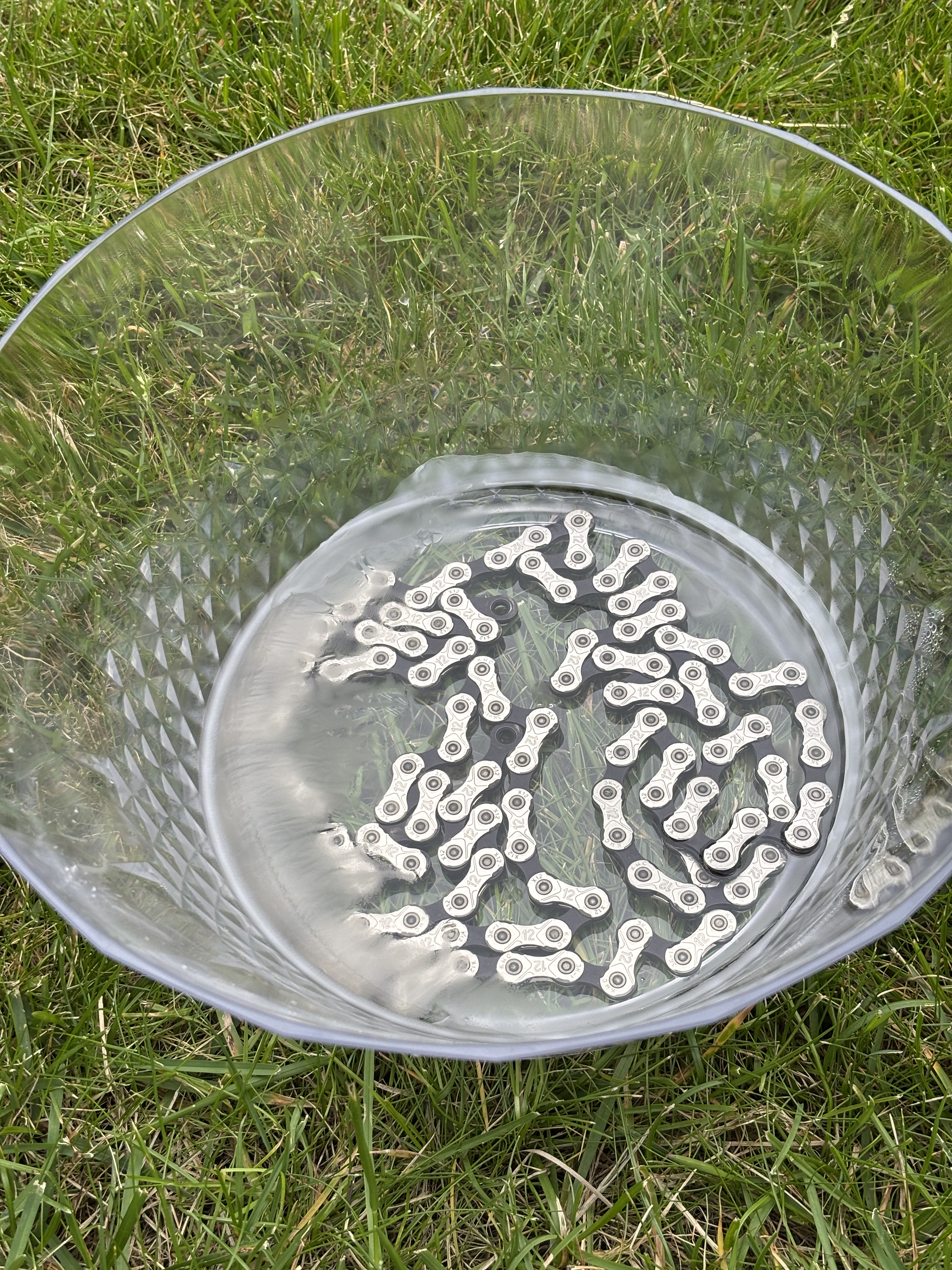
Bicycle chain laying in melted pure paraffin wax without additives. The sticky film indicates that the wax is about to solidify, and that the chain should be taken out.

How best to lubricate a bicycle chain is a commonly debated question among cyclists.

==== Wet lube ====
Liquid lubricants, like oil, penetrate to the inside of the links and are not easily displaced, but quickly attract dirt. The outside of the chain should be wiped dry after the wet lubricant has had enough time to penetrate into the links to avoid pickup of dirt.

==== Dry lube ====
"Dry" lubricants, often containing wax or Teflon, are transported by an evaporating solvent, and stay cleaner in use, but are less durable, and require frequent maintenance.

==== Wax lubrication ====
Since around 2020, there has been a renewed trend among cyclists to use solid wax lubrication (like for example 100% paraffin wax or proprietary formulations) instead of oil based lubrication. Immersion wax stays cleaner in use and is reasonably durable, but requires an initial thorough degreasing (for example using white spirit followed with isopropanol) before the first wax immersion, and some basic equipment to melt the wax and re-wax when needed. Re-waxing may be necessary every 200-400 kilometers depending on riding conditions (dusty, wet or muddy conditions may require more frequent re-waxing). One popular method is to put the cleaned chain in a bowl and melt the wax in a water bath as a safety measure instead of melting directly in a pan, to minimize fumes and avoid overheating the wax which can be a fire hazard. Alternatively, chain wax melting equipment which fulfills the same purpose can be purchased. Since the waxing requires a little setup each time, many cyclists wax two or three chains at a time, and rotate between them one by one as the wax wears off. Long-distance bicycle tourists may even carry a spare chain that has been waxed. Drip-wax may also be an alternative for lubrication in the field as the wax wears off.

=== Chain removal ===
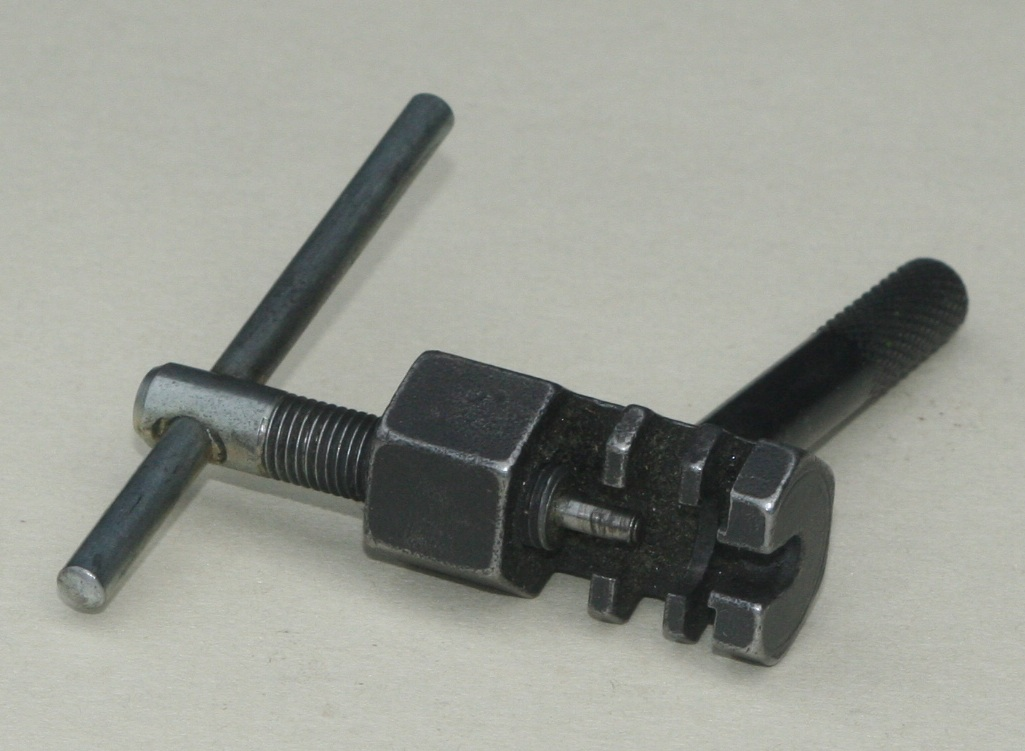
Chain tool

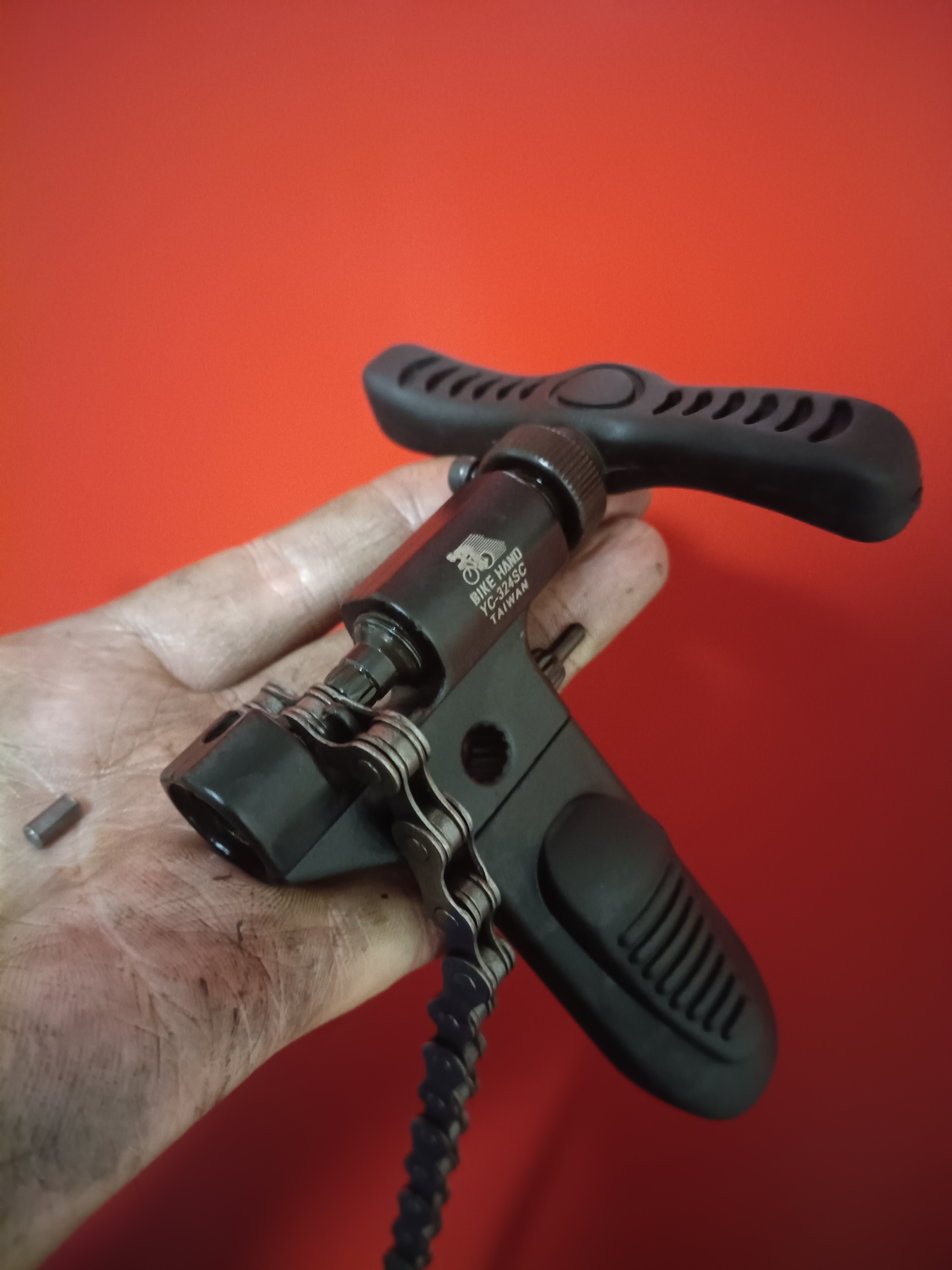
Removed chain pin (rivet) alongside a chain breaker with the bicycle chain still secured in the tool.

On most upright bicycles, the chain loops through the right rear triangle made by the right chain stay and seat tube. Thus a chain must be separated, (or "broken" ) unless the triangle can be split (usually the seat stay). The chain can be broken using a chain tool, which presses out a chain pin (rivet) to separate the link, or by opening a master link.

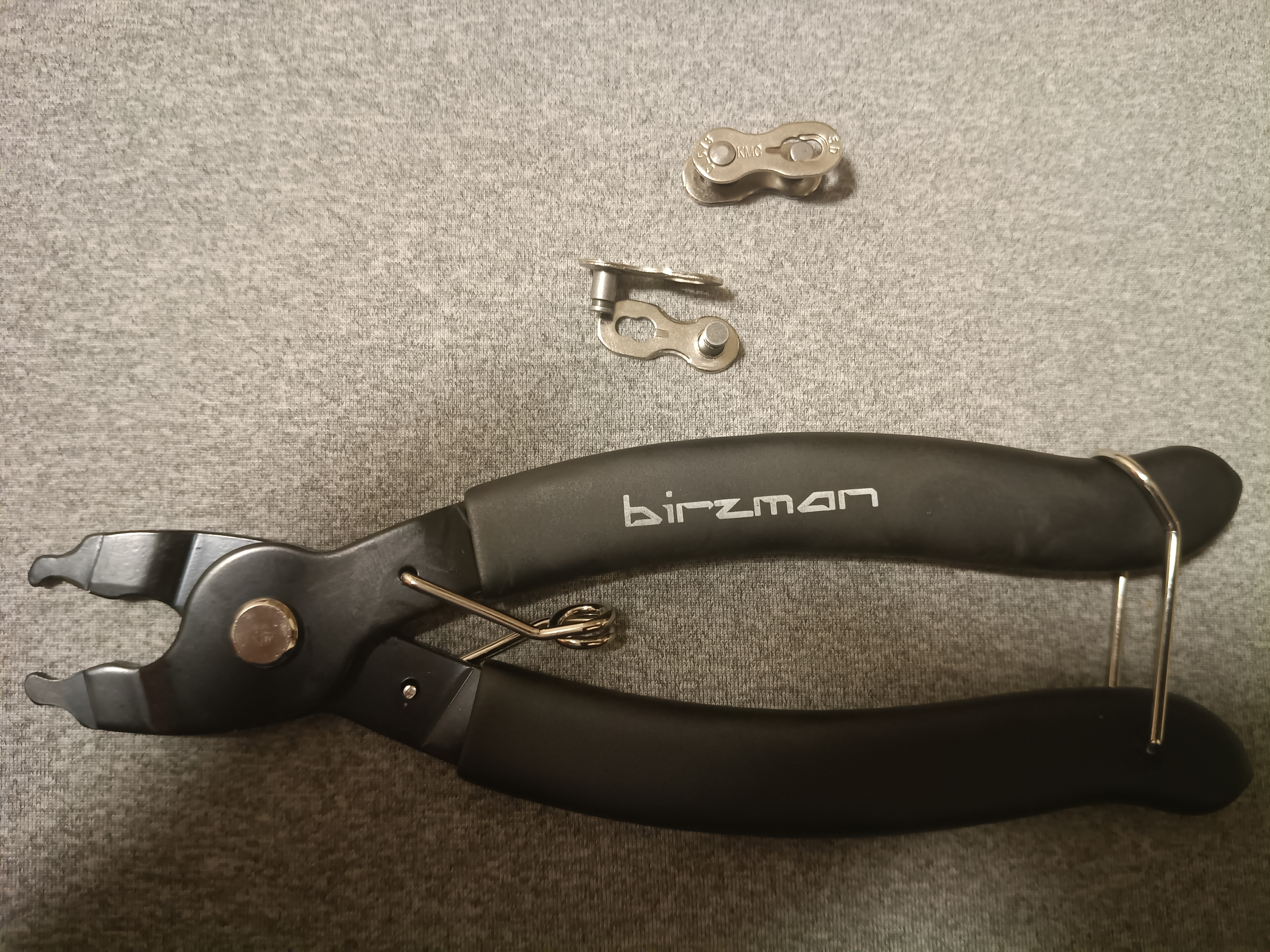
Chain pliers alongside two bicycle master (quick) links.

A master link (also called a connecting link or quick link) allows the chain to be installed or removed without specialized tools. Most master links can be installed by hand and are locked into place by applying chain tension or by applying pedalling torque. Quick link pliers can make removal significantly easier particularly when the chain is too tight or difficult to release.

Some newer chain designs, such as Shimano and Campagnolo 10-speed chains, require a special replacement pin to be used when installing or reinstalling a separated chain. An alternative to this process is to install a master link, such as a SRAM Power Link or a Wippermann Connex.

== Wear ==
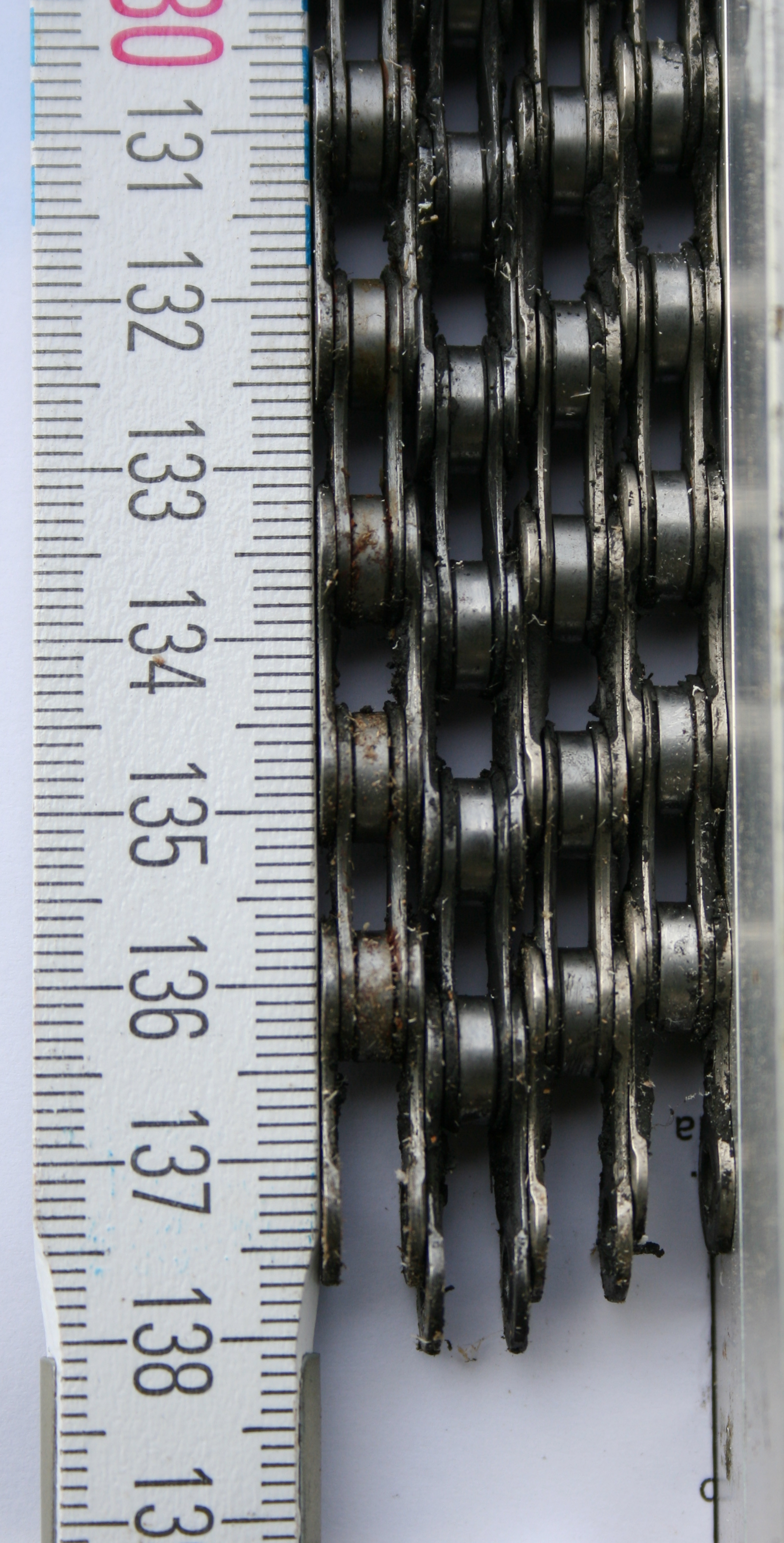
Four lengths of bicycle chain with the same number of links but with different degrees of wear. They show chain stretch, a consequence of wear

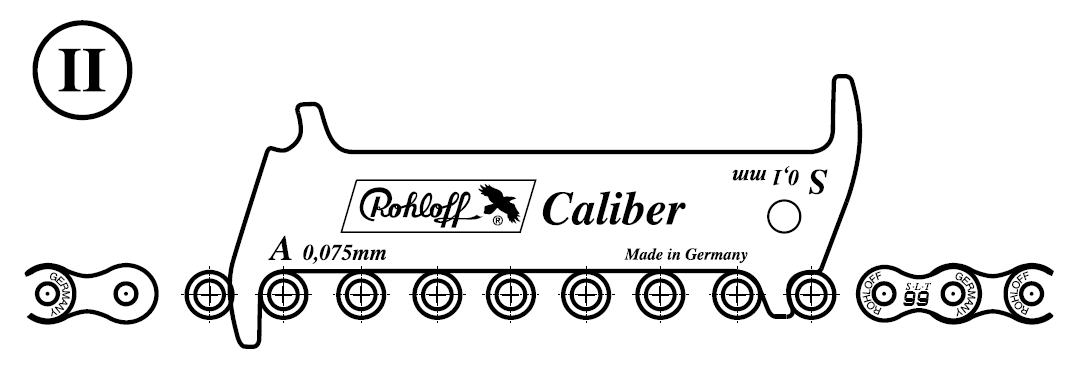
A chain-wear tool that exactly measures the length of a given number of chain links to detect when a chain is excessively worn; the two sides of the tool measure different degrees of wear

Chain wear, often misleadingly called chain stretch, becomes an issue with extensive cycling. The wear is removal of material from the bushings and pins (or half-bushings, in the Sedis design, also, called "bushing-less", where the bushing is part of the inner plate) rather than elongation of the sideplates. The tension created by pedaling is insufficient to cause the latter. Because the spacing from link to link on a worn chain is longer than the 1/2 inch (12.7 mm) specification, those links will not precisely fit the spaces between teeth on the sprockets. This can result in increased wear on the sprockets, and possibly "chain skip" on derailleur drivetrains, in which pedalling tension causes the chain to slide up over the tops of the sprocket teeth and move ("skip") to the next alignment, reducing power transfer and making pedalling uncomfortable.

Since chain wear is strongly aggravated by dirt getting into the links, the lifetime of a chain depends mostly on how well it is cleaned and lubricated, and does not depend on the mechanical load. Depending on use and cleaning, a chain can last only 1,000 kilometres (600 miles) (e.g. in cross-country use, or all-weather use), 3,000 to 5,000 km (2,000 to 3,000 mi) for well-maintained derailleur chains, or more than 6,000 kilometres (4,000 mi) for perfectly groomed high-quality chains, single-gear, or hub-gear chains with a full cover chain guard.

Nickel-plated chain also confers a measure of self-lubrication to its moving parts as nickel is a relatively non-galling metal.

Chain wear rates are highly variable. One way to measure wear is with a ruler or machinist's rule. Another is with a chain wear tool, which typically has a "tooth" of about the same size found on a sprocket. They are placed on a chain under light load, and if the tooth drops in all the way, the chain should be replaced.

Twenty half-links in a new chain measure 10 inches (254 mm), and replacement is recommended before the old chain measures 10 1/16 inches (256 mm) (0.7% wear). A more conservative limit is when 24 half-links in the old chain measure 12 1/16 inches (306 mm) (0.5% wear). If the chain has worn beyond this limit, the rear sprockets are also likely to wear, in extreme cases followed by the front chainrings. In this case, the 'skipping' mentioned above is liable to continue even after the chain is replaced, as the teeth of the sprockets will have become unevenly worn (in extreme cases, hook-shaped). Replacing worn sprocket cassettes and chainrings after missing the chain replacement window is much more expensive than simply replacing a worn chain.

== Sizes ==
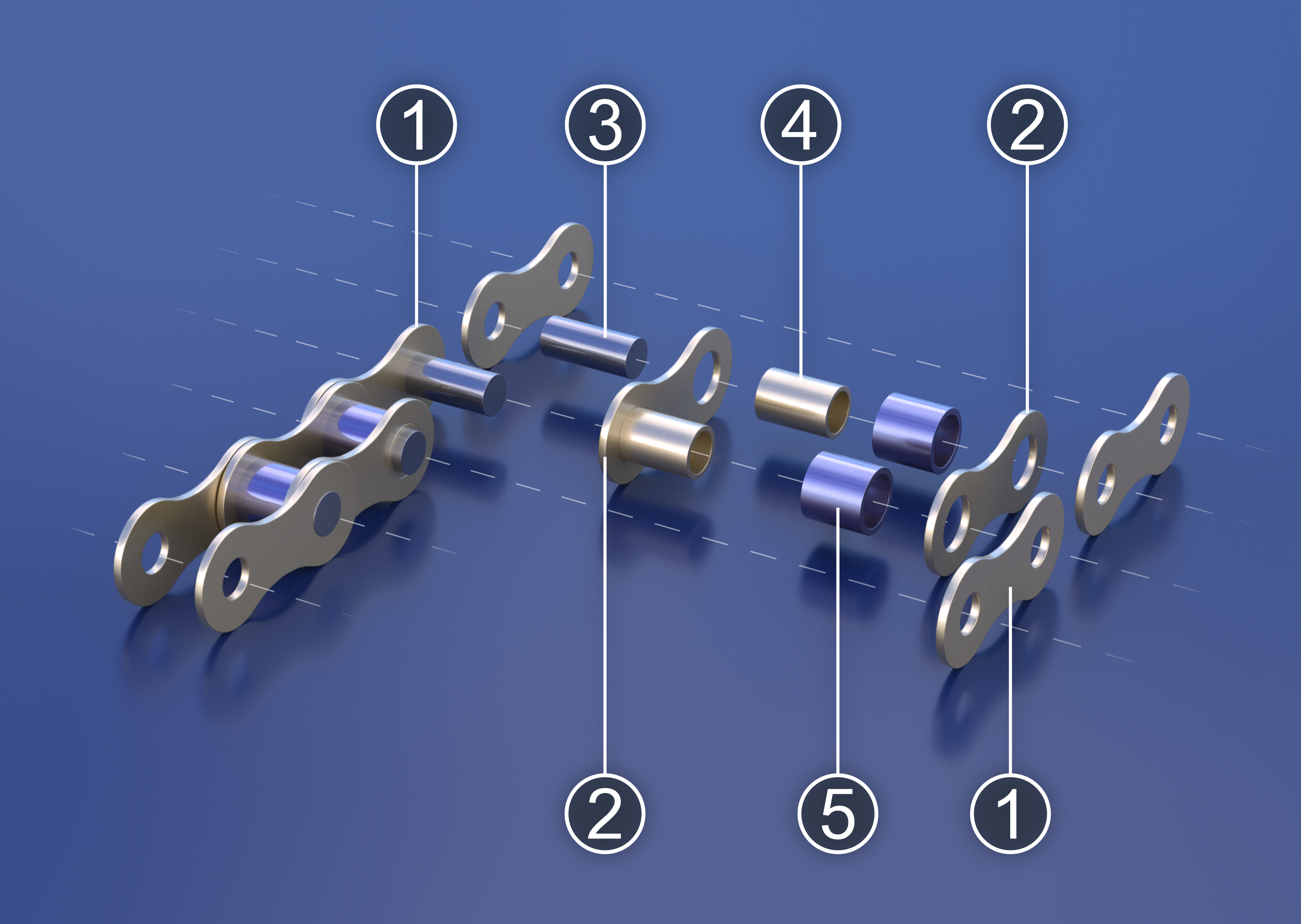
Exploded view of a few bicycle chain links of the older type having full bushings from one inner side plate to the other. (1) outer plate; (2) inner plate; (3) pin; (4) bushing; (5) roller.

=== Pitch ===
The chain in use on modern bicycles has a 1/2 inch (12.7 mm) pitch, which is the distance from one pin center to another, ANSI standard #40, where the 4 in "#40" indicates the pitch of the chain in eighths of an inch; and ISO standard 606 (metric) #8, where the 8 indicates the pitch in sixteenths of an inch. Its roller diameter is 5/16 inch (7.9 mm).

While the exploded view diagram here shows the older type having full bushings, modern bicycle chain has "half bushings" formed into the inner side plates, referred to as "bushingless" and "bushless" by Sheldon Brown.

1976: Shimano briefly made their own 10 pitch Dura-Ace track-specific system with 10 mm (3/8 in) (approximately) pitch from about 1976 to 1980—called Shimano Dura-Ace 10 pitch. The Shimano 10 pitch system is incompatible with ANSI standard #40 (1/2″) e.g. chains, sprockets and so on, and was outlawed by the Japan Keirin Association, helping in its demise.

=== Chain width ===
Chains come in 3/32 in (2.4 mm), 1/8 in (3.2 mm), 5/32 in (4.0 mm), or 3/16 in (4.8 mm) roller widths, the internal width between the inner plates.

- 3/32 in (2.4 mm) chains are generally used on bikes with derailleurs such as racing, touring, and mountain bikes. (Fixed sprockets and freewheels are also available in 3/32 in (2.4 mm) widths, so fixed-gear and single-speed bikes can be set up to use the narrower and lighter 3/32 in (2.4 mm) chains.)
- 1/8 in (3.2 mm) chains are typically used on bikes with a single rear sprocket: those with coaster brakes, hub gears, fixed gears such as track bicycles, or BMX bikes.
- 5/32 in (4.0 mm) chains are used on cargo bikes and tricycles.

With derailleur-equipped bicycles, the external width of the chain (measured at the connecting rivet) also matters, because chains must not be too wide for the cogset or the chain will rub on the next larger sprocket, and chains must not be too narrow, which allows them to fall between two sprockets.

Chains can also be identified by the number of rear sprockets they can support, anywhere from 3 to 13. The following list enables measuring a chain of unknown origin to determine its suitability.

- 6 speed – 7.3 mm (^{9}/_{32} in) (Shimano HG), 7.1 mm (^{9}/_{32} in) (SRAM, Shimano IG)
- 7 speed – 7.3 mm (9/32 in) (Shimano HG), 7.1 mm (9/32 in) (SRAM, Shimano IG)
- 8 speed – 7.3 mm (9/32 in) (Shimano HG), 7.1 mm (9/32 in) (SRAM, Shimano IG)
- 9 speed – 6.5 to 7.0 mm (1/4 to 9/32 in) (all brands)
- 10 speed – 6.0 to 7.0 mm (1/4 to 9/32 in) (Shimano, Campagnolo)
- 10 speed (narrow) – 5.88 mm (7/32 in) (Campagnolo, KMC)
- 10 speed (narrow, direction) – 5.88 mm (7/32 in) (Shimano CN-5700, CN-6700, CN-7900)
- 11 speed – 5.5 to 5.62 mm (7/32 to 7/32 in) (Campagnolo, KMC, Shimano CN-9000)
- 12 speed – 5.3 mm (13/64 in) (SRAM)
- 13 speed – 4.9 mm wide – Campagnolo Ekar

The Wikibook, "Bicycle Maintenance and Repair", has more details on this topic.

=== Chain length ===
New chains usually come in a stock length, long enough for most upright bike applications. The appropriate number of links must be removed before installation in order for the drive train to function properly. The pin connecting links can be pushed out with a chain tool to shorten, and additional links may be added to lengthen.

In the case of derailleur gears the chain is usually long enough so that it can be shifted onto the largest front chain ring and the largest rear sprocket without jamming, and not so long that, when shifted onto the smallest front chain ring and the smallest rear sprocket, the rear derailleur cannot take up all the slack. Meeting both these requirements is only possible if the rear derailleur is compatible with the gear range being used on the bike. It is broadly accepted as inadvisable to actually use the large/large and small/small gear combinations, a practice known as cross-chaining, due to chain stress and wear.

In the case of single-speed bicycles and hub gears, the chain length must match the distance between crank and rear hub and the sizes of the front chain ring and rear sprocket. These bikes usually have some mechanism for small adjustments such as horizontal dropouts, track ends, or an eccentric mechanism in the rear hub or the bottom bracket. In extreme cases, a chain half-link may be necessary.

== Variations ==
In order to reduce weight, chains have been manufactured with hollow pins and with cut-outs in the links. Chains have also been made of stainless steel for corrosion resistance and titanium for weight reduction, but they are expensive. A recent trend is chains of various colors, and at least one manufacturer offers a chain model specifically for electric bicycles.

== Manufacturers ==
Notable bicycle chain manufacturers include:

- Renold
- Campagnolo
- Rohloff AG
- KMC Chain
- Shimano
- SRAM
- Wippermann

== See also ==
- Bicycle gearing
- Chainless bicycles
