= Master link =

Roller chain accessory

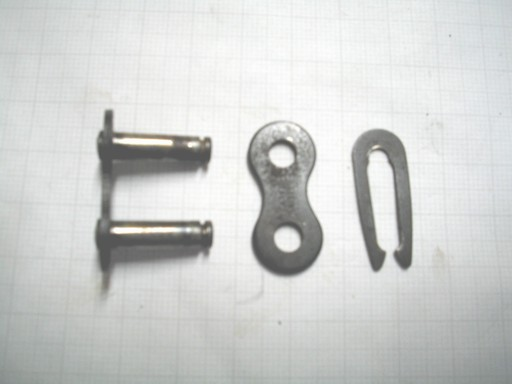
Figure 1: A traditional master link, compatible with straight chainlines and widely spaced sprockets.

Figure 2: Schematic of a modern master link.

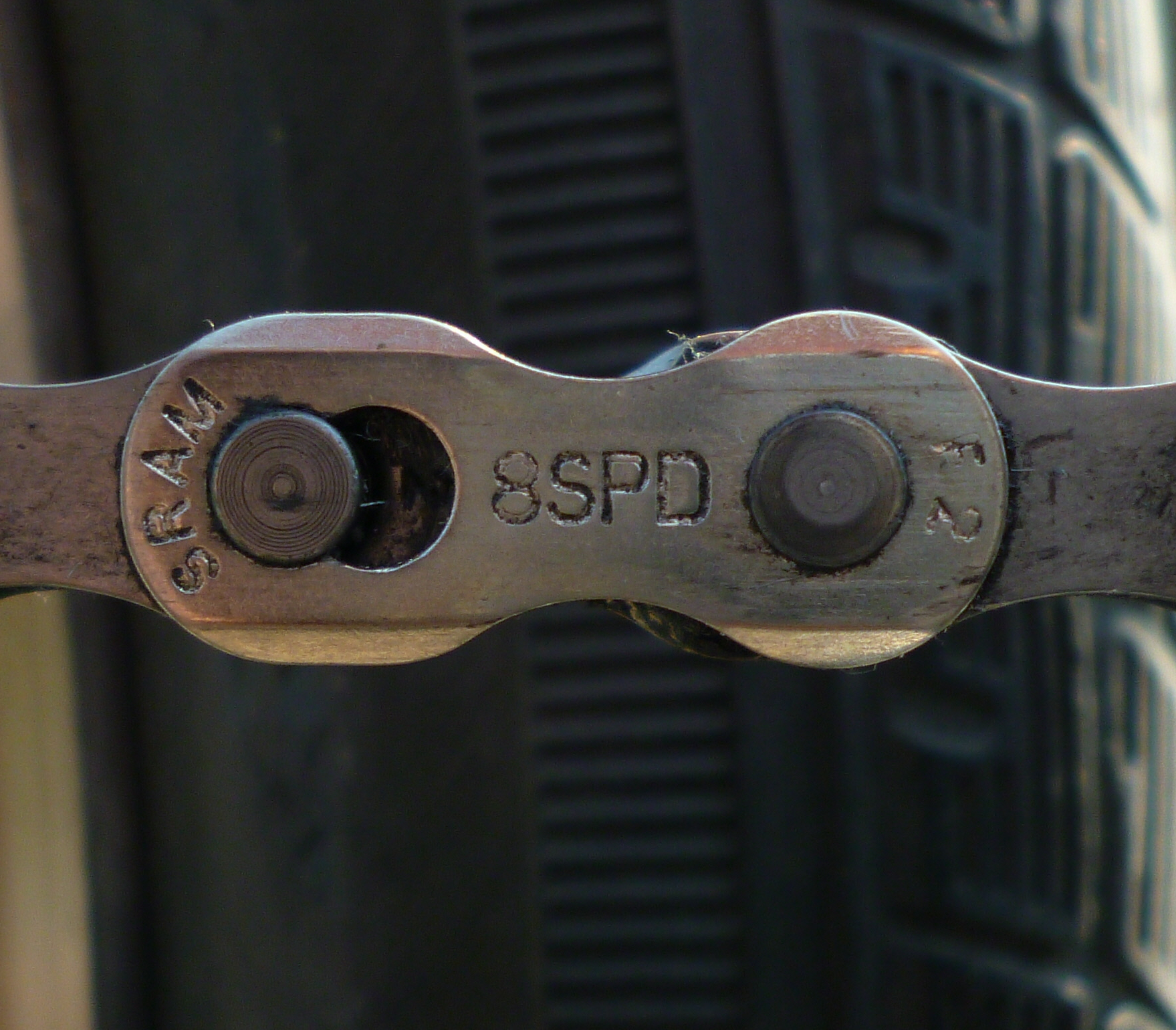
Figure 3: A SRAM Powerlink, joining two ends of a chain.

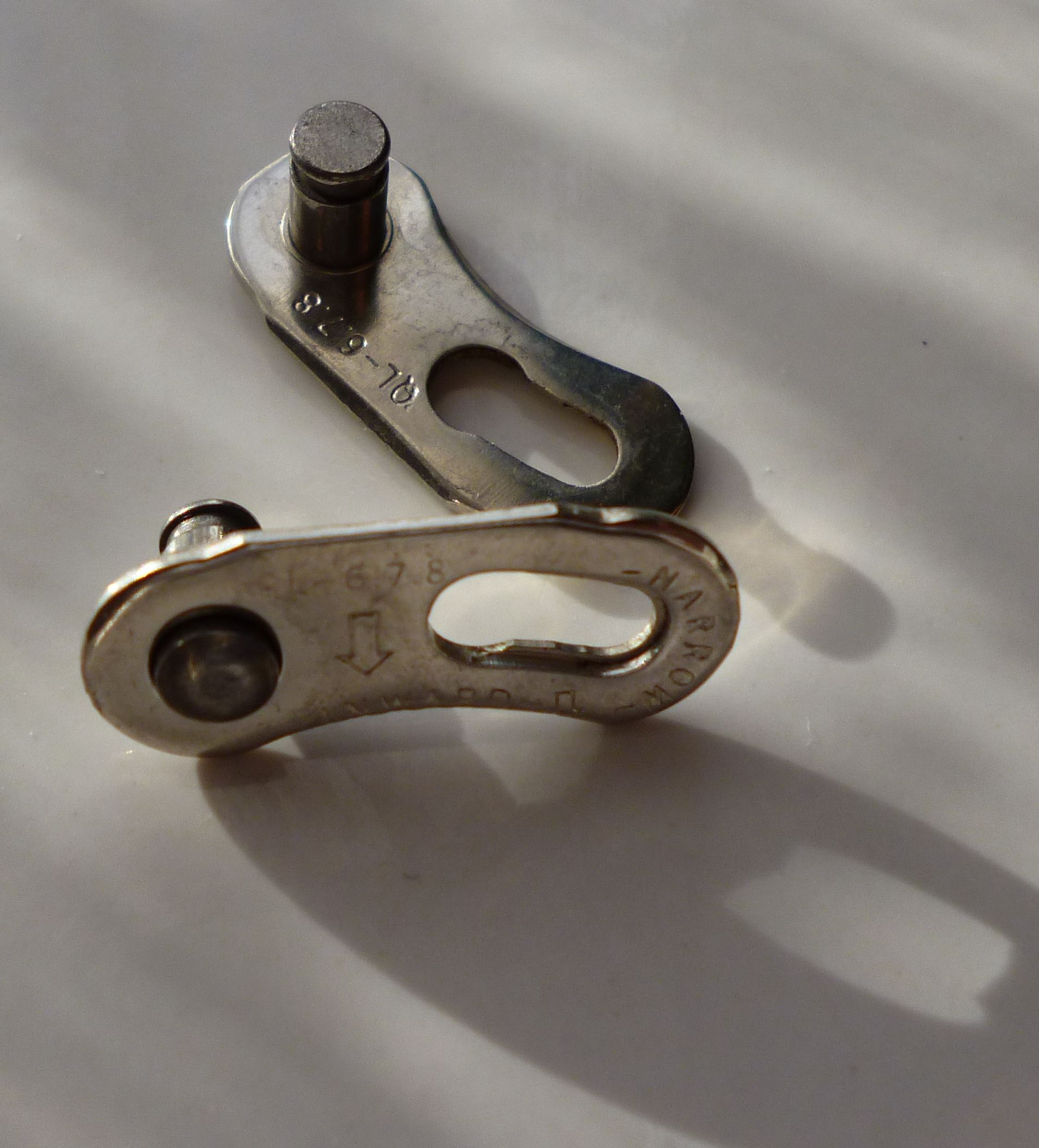
Figure 4: A master link with a slightly raised profile. Note that the embossed arrow should point toward the inside of the chain-loop. Note also the more prominent pin excess.

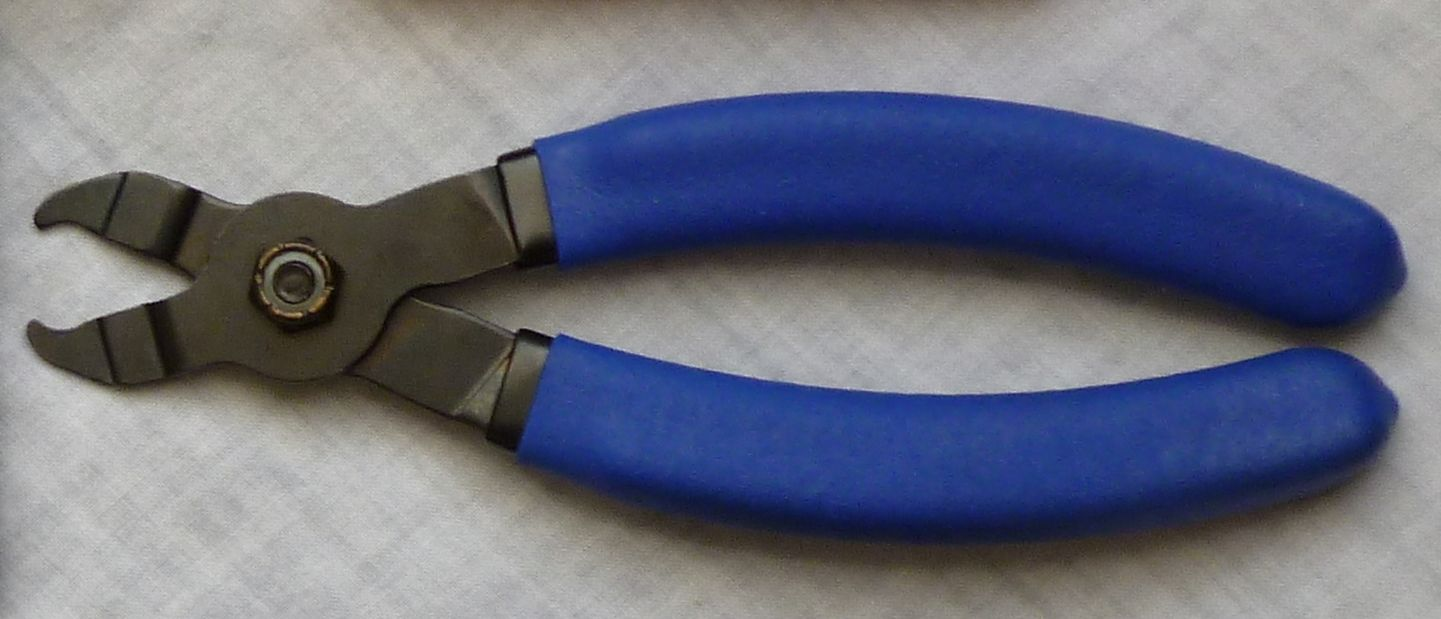
Figure 5: Master link pliers. They fit over the rollers to take the hard work out of link removal.

A master link or quick-release link is a roller chain accessory that allows convenient connection and disconnection of a chain without the need for a chain tool. It acts as a set of the chain's outer plates, so joining two sets of the chain's inner plate ends. Such master links may or may not be re-usable. A chain tool is nonetheless needed to adjust a chain's length, for example to shorten a new chain before connecting its ends. They are used on bicycles and motorcycles.

== On bicycles ==
There are at least two styles of master link used to connect bicycle chain. In both cases the master link set consists of two outer plates, each of which resembles the outer plate of a chain.

=== Straight chainline compatible ===
The oldest type of master link, available for decades, has two pins connected to the same plate. (Refer to Figure 1). It has been in use mainly in single-speed, hub-geared, or other bicycle drivetrain systems with straight chainlines or widely spaced sprockets. In this assembly, the outside plate with the two pins protruding from it are spaced at the same pitch as the chain at 12.7 mm (0.50 in), and the free ends of the pins are grooved. The other plate fits over the ends of the pins and is secured with a spring clip to make the connection, and this type of master link comes closest to being re-usable.

=== External derailleur compatible ===
For bicycles with derailleur gears, a special kind of master link has been developed to fit the narrow chains used on closely spaced sprockets. In this case, each plate has one pin protruding from it, and the pin ends are grooved. (Refer to Figures 2, 3 and 4). In addition to pins, each link plate has a tapered slot, one end of which is wide enough to accommodate the end of a pin, while the other presents a tight fit.

The link plates fit together, and connect the chain by feeding their pins through the bushings of the inner plates, from opposite sides. In this way the pair form a loosely interconnected, closed set, with each master link's pin located in the slot of the other, and the two bushings held captive. The connection is then made secure by pulling the chain outwards on both sides of the link. This latter action forces the pin ends into the narrow ends of the slots where they become locked. The overall security of such a master link depends upon the chain being under tension in normal use, though it can fail in extreme conditions where this condition does not hold.

The manufacturers' instructions for the removal of a master link is to press the face of the two plates together, while pressing both ends inward. When a link is new, or when otherwise difficult to remove, master link pliers can be used (see figure 5). The special pliers have curved ends to accommodate the rollers, and make easy work of even the most difficult removal.

Some links have side plates that are raised on top (figure 4), while some are straight, (figure 3), and some have more prominent pin projections than others. Since a chain on a derailleur-fitted bicycle is reversed for part of its excursion through the drive-train, and because some cogsets have close ramp tolerances, such a link might cause a malfunction if the wrong selection were made. Bushingless chains, with smaller projections, are used on bicycles with large cogsets, since their clearances are more critical than those with only seven speeds. In these former cases a master link of comparable quality is needed. As a result, some manufacturers of derailleurs (e.g. SRAM) recommend only their own products, and these days package a master link with each new chain that is purchased. Chains for small cogsets (e.g. seven-speeds) and other than derailleur-fitted bicycles are more tolerant of these master link dimensions.
