= Chain tool =

Tool for disassembling and assembling a bicycle chain

- Classification: Bicycle tools

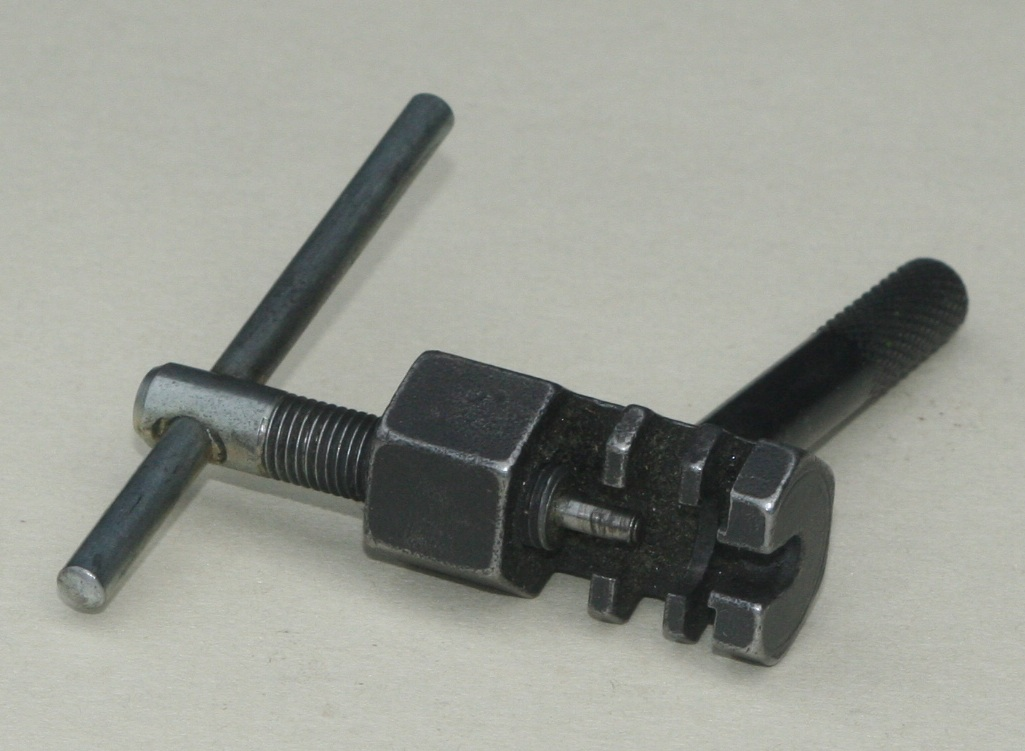
A typical chain tool. With a chain placed on the central sprocket, the screw is turned until a pin is pushed from the linkage

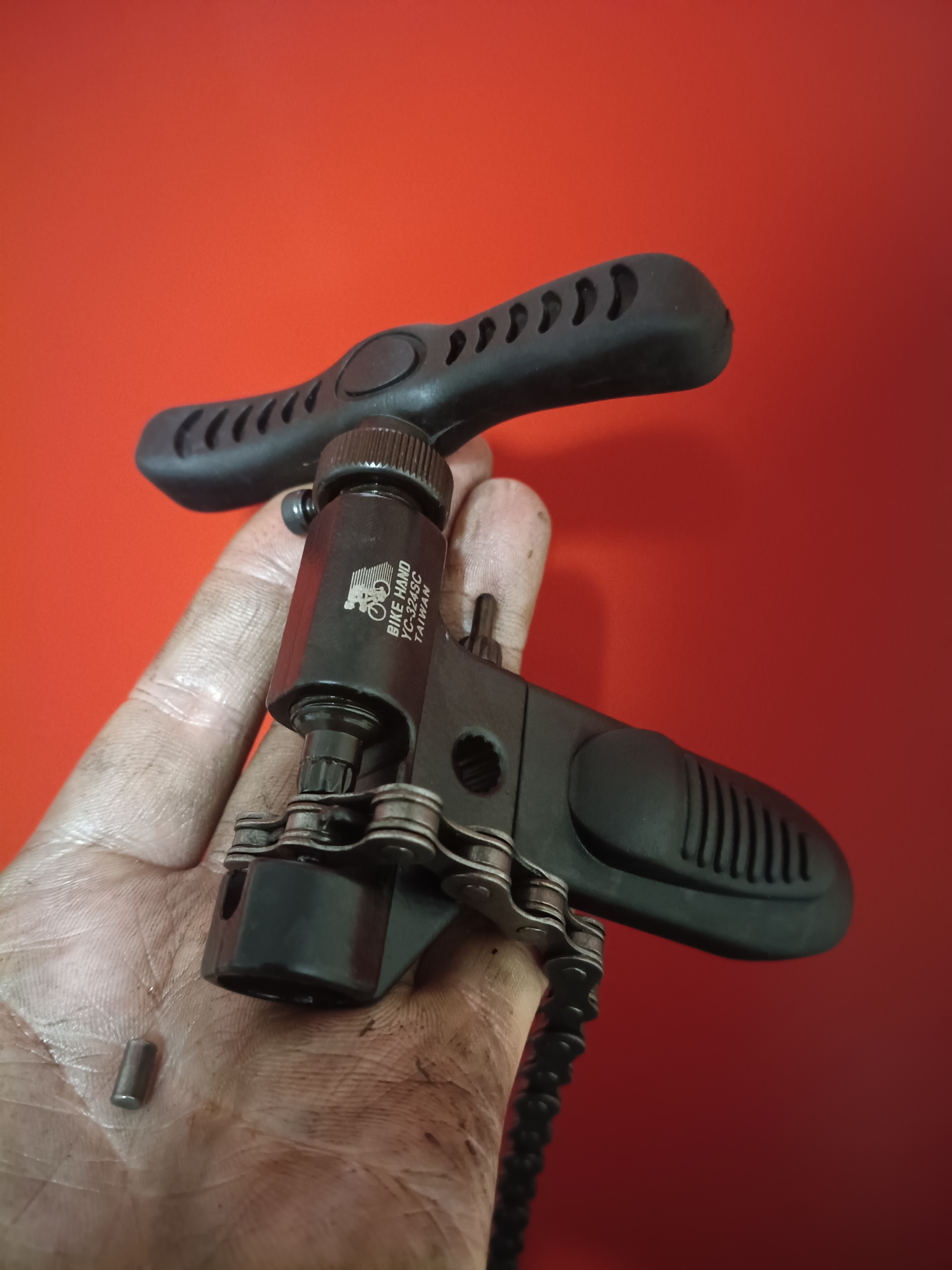
Ejected chain pin (rivet) displayed on a palm while the chain remains mounted in a chain breaker tool.

A chain tool is a small mechanical device used to disassemble and reassemble a bicycle chain. It is primarily used to push out and reinsert chain pins (rivets), allowing a chain to be "broken" for removal, repair, or replacement, and then rejoined. Chain tools are also commonly used to resize a bicycle chain by removing the excess links to achieve the correct chain length for a specific bicycle setup.

A bicycle chain consists of interlinked outer and inner plates held together by pins. The chain tool applies controlled force via a threaded screw to gradually push these pins out of, or back into, the chain links, depending upon the intention of the user.

The chain tool has two positions where a chain can be inserted perpendicular to the tool, one close to the movable screw portion, and one lower down just above the fixed end. In each position, there are a pair of protruding tabs; one fits into the center of one link of the chain, the other fits into the center of the next link. With the chain properly in place, the pin is held in the center of the tool, so that the tip of the movable screw can press on the end of the pin. The end of the screw is slightly narrower than the pin, so that it can press the pin through the link. The end of the screw is often a removable piece which can be replaced when worn.

== Variations and alternatives ==
Most chain tools are designed for chains where the links have flat plates. For chains with complicated shaped plates designed to facilitate smooth shifting, specific chain tools are available which are identical in design and operation, but have the ears protruding into the chain shaped in cross section to fit the links of the particular chain in question precisely, so as to hold the pin in the all-important vertical alignment with the screw of the tool.

Some chain tools are better at removing pins than they are at inserting them. Once completely removed, chain pins are often very difficult to insert with a tool unless it has been specifically designed to do so. Users may overcome this limitation of some tools by never completely removing a pin that they intend to replace. They push the pin so that the chain can be broken, to shorten it for example, which leads to it being firmly retained in the furthest plate. This way, even simple chain tools can press the pin back into place.

While a chain tool is required to shorten simple chains on a bicycle, and as described above, can often be used to reconnect them, there are fast-release chain links that allow repeated making and breaking of a chain. They are connected by hand pressure, but often need a pair of needle-nosed pliers for removal. These links invariably replace a pair of outside plates on a chain, so joining two sets of inside plates. Bicycles with a single front chainring and rear sprocket (for example bicycles with hub gears or coaster brake hubs) may have a master link on the chain which holds the pin in place with an easily removable c-clip. Some master links are bevelled on top, and can interfere with the smooth operation of a derailleur system. Some derailleur suppliers have produced a chain with a fast-release link, made with straight plates to suit their derailleur products.

A chain tool is usually needed to shorten a chain, even when a fast-release link is being used, unless the combined number of links plus the connection link just happens to be the length required. Consider the following example.

Assume that an old derailleur chain is to be replaced with a new chain containing a suitable fast release link, supplied with it. The old chain is broken with a chain tool to remove it, and counting the links it is noted that there were 112 in total. The new chain should have the same length, but counting its links concludes that including the fast-release link there are 116 of them. (The chain link count on a new chain will not necessarily agree with the number given on its packaging). A chain of this type is provided with inner plates at both ends for this purpose. Bearing in mind that the chain must end up with two sets of inner plate ends after the shortening, then the chain tool can be used to completely remove four links. The fast-release link plates are installed by hand as if they were a set of outer plates, and can be fixed in place by hand pressure alone. There are variations of the method in use, but in each case a chain tool will usually be needed.

== Bibliography ==
- Rob van der Plas: Die Fahrradwerkstatt – Reparatur und Wartung Schritt für Schritt. 1. Auflage, BVA Bielefelder Verlaganstalt, Bielefeld, 1995, ISBN 3-87073-147-8
- Richard Hallet: Fahrrad-Wartung-Pflege-Reparatur. 1. Auflage, BVA Bielefelder Verlag GmbH & Co. KG, Bielefeld, 2003, ISBN 3-87073-308-X
- Jörg Urban, Jürgen Brück: Fahrradreparaturen Wartung und Pannenhilfe. 1. Auflage, Gondrom Verlag GmbH, Bindlach, 2007, ISBN 978-3-8112-2938-9
