= Bar-link chain =

Type of mechanical drive chain

Top view of a segment from a "bar-link" bicycle chain.

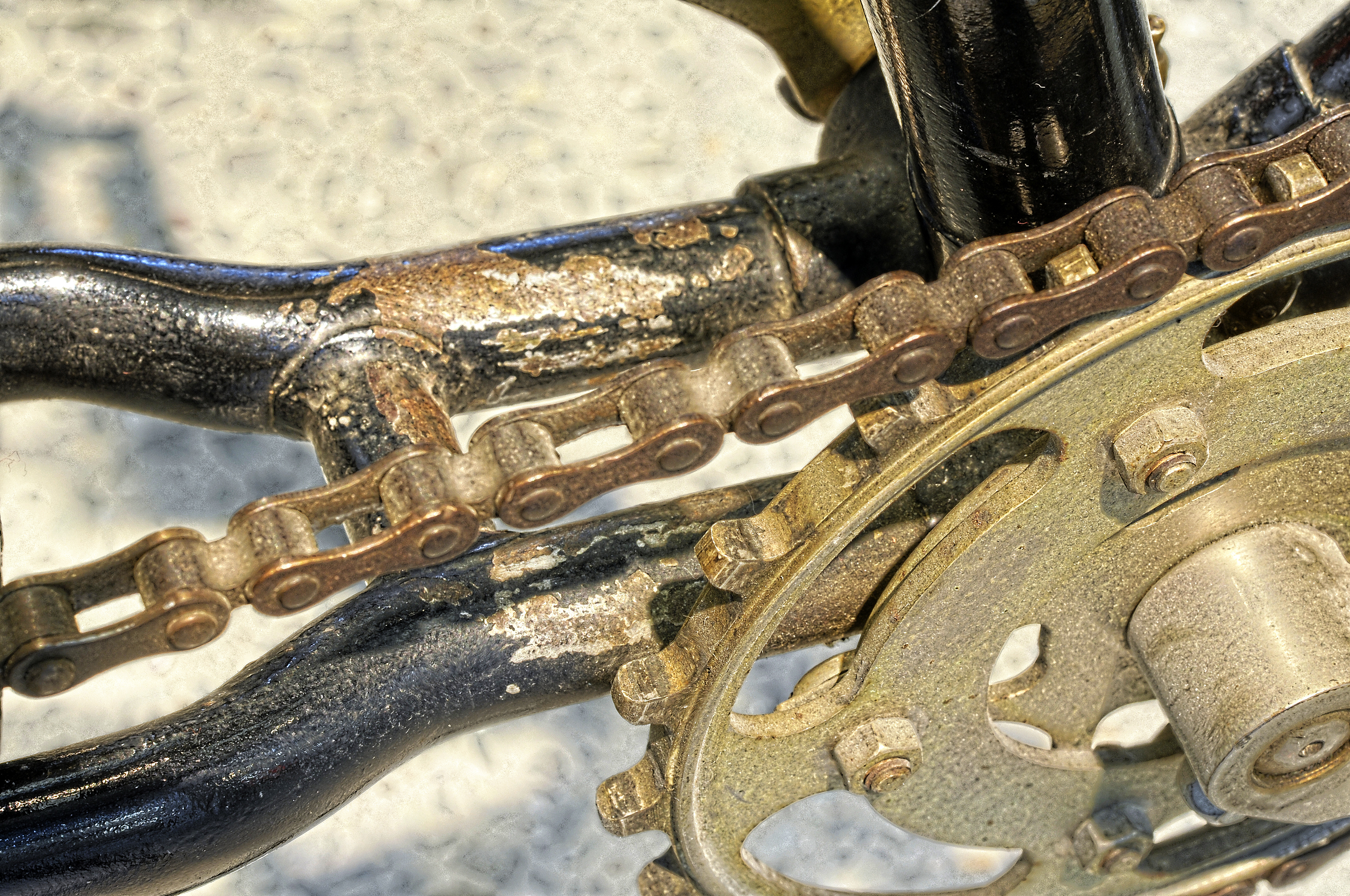
Block chain on a bicycle by Laurin & Klement, exhibited at the Škoda Muzeum

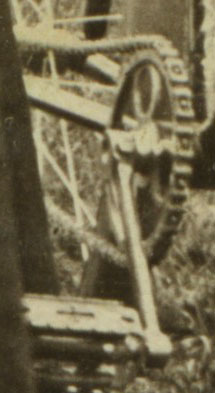
Bicycle chain of the bar-link or block chain type on safety bicycle in a vintage (c1900) photograph

A bar-link chain, also called a block-and-bar chain or a block chain, is a mechanical drive chain. It is composed of side plates, where each plate straddles one end of a block and is connected to the block with a pin going through a hole at one end of the block.

== Overview ==
Bar-link chains are simple, and often heavier and less efficient when compared with modern roller chains due to the lack of rolling motion as the chain engages and disengages the sprockets.

However, they have advantages in specific applications, especially where no sprockets are needed, where strength is a greater concern than efficiency (high loads), and where the chain has special fixtures for holding or engaging a load.
