= Sprocket =

Toothed wheel or cog

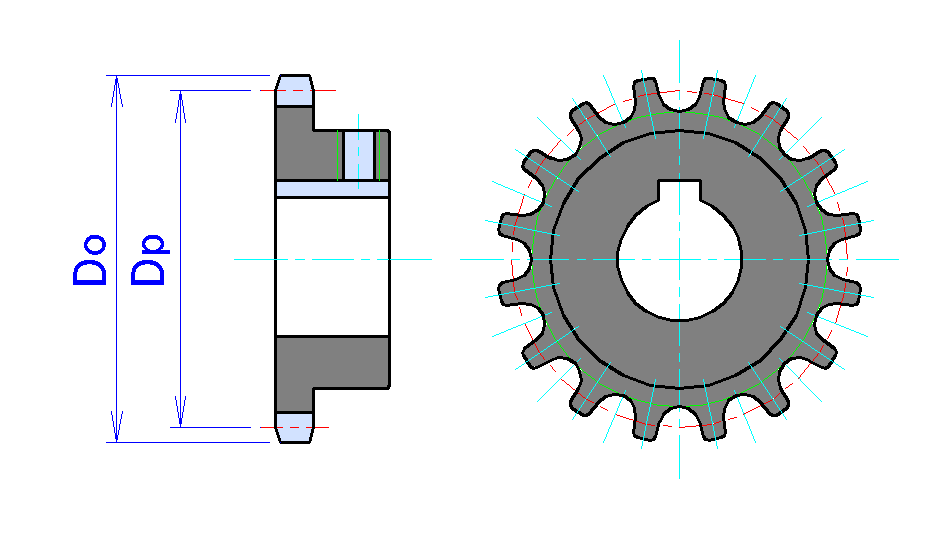
16 tooth sprocket. Do = Sprocket diameter. Dp = Pitch diameter

A sprocket and roller chain

A sprocket, sprocket-wheel or chainwheel is a profiled wheel with teeth that mesh with a chain, rack or other perforated or indented material. The name 'sprocket' applies generally to any wheel upon which radial projections engage a chain passing over it. It is distinguished from a gear in that sprockets are never meshed together directly, and differs from a pulley in that sprockets have teeth and pulleys are smooth except for timing pulleys used with toothed belts.

Sprockets are used in bicycles, motorcycles, tracked vehicles, and other machinery either to transmit rotary motion between two shafts where gears are unsuitable or to impart linear motion to a track, tape etc. Perhaps the most common form of sprocket may be found in the bicycle, in which the pedal shaft carries a large sprocket-wheel, which drives a chain, which, in turn, drives a small sprocket on the axle of the rear wheel. Early automobiles were also largely driven by sprocket and chain mechanism, a practice largely copied from bicycles.

Sprockets are of various designs, a maximum of efficiency being claimed for each by its originator. Sprockets typically do not have a flange. Some sprockets used with timing belts have flanges to keep the timing belt centered. Sprockets and chains are also used for power transmission from one shaft to another where slippage is not admissible, sprocket chains being used instead of belts or ropes and sprocket-wheels instead of pulleys. They can be run at high speed and some forms of chain are so constructed as to be noiseless even at high speed.

== Usage ==
The term 'sprocket' originally applied to the projection from the wheel that caught on the chain and provided the drive to it. The overall wheel was then termed a 'sprocket wheel'. With time and common use of these devices, the overall wheel became known as a sprocket. The earlier uses would now be seen as archaic.

== Transportation ==
In the case of bicycle chains, it is possible to modify the overall gear ratio of the chain drive by varying the diameter (and therefore, the tooth count) of the sprockets on each side of the chain. This is the basis of derailleur gears. A multi-speed bicycle, by providing two or three different-sized driving sprockets and up to 12 (as of 2018) different-sized driven sprockets, allows up to 36 different gear ratios. The resulting lower gear ratios make the bike easier to pedal up hills while the higher gear ratios make the bike more powerful to pedal on flats and downhills. In a similar way, manually changing the sprockets on a motorcycle can change the characteristics of acceleration and top speed by modifying the final drive gear ratio. The final drive gear ratio can be calculated by dividing the number of teeth on the rear sprocket by the number of teeth on the counter-shaft sprocket. With respect to the stock gearing on a motorcycle, installing a smaller counter-shaft sprocket (fewer teeth), or a larger rear sprocket (more teeth), produces a lower gear ratio, which increases the acceleration of the motorcycle but decreases its top speed. Installing a larger counter-shaft sprocket, or a smaller rear sprocket, produces a higher gear ratio, which decreases the acceleration of the motorcycle but increases its top speed.

== Chain tracked vehicles ==
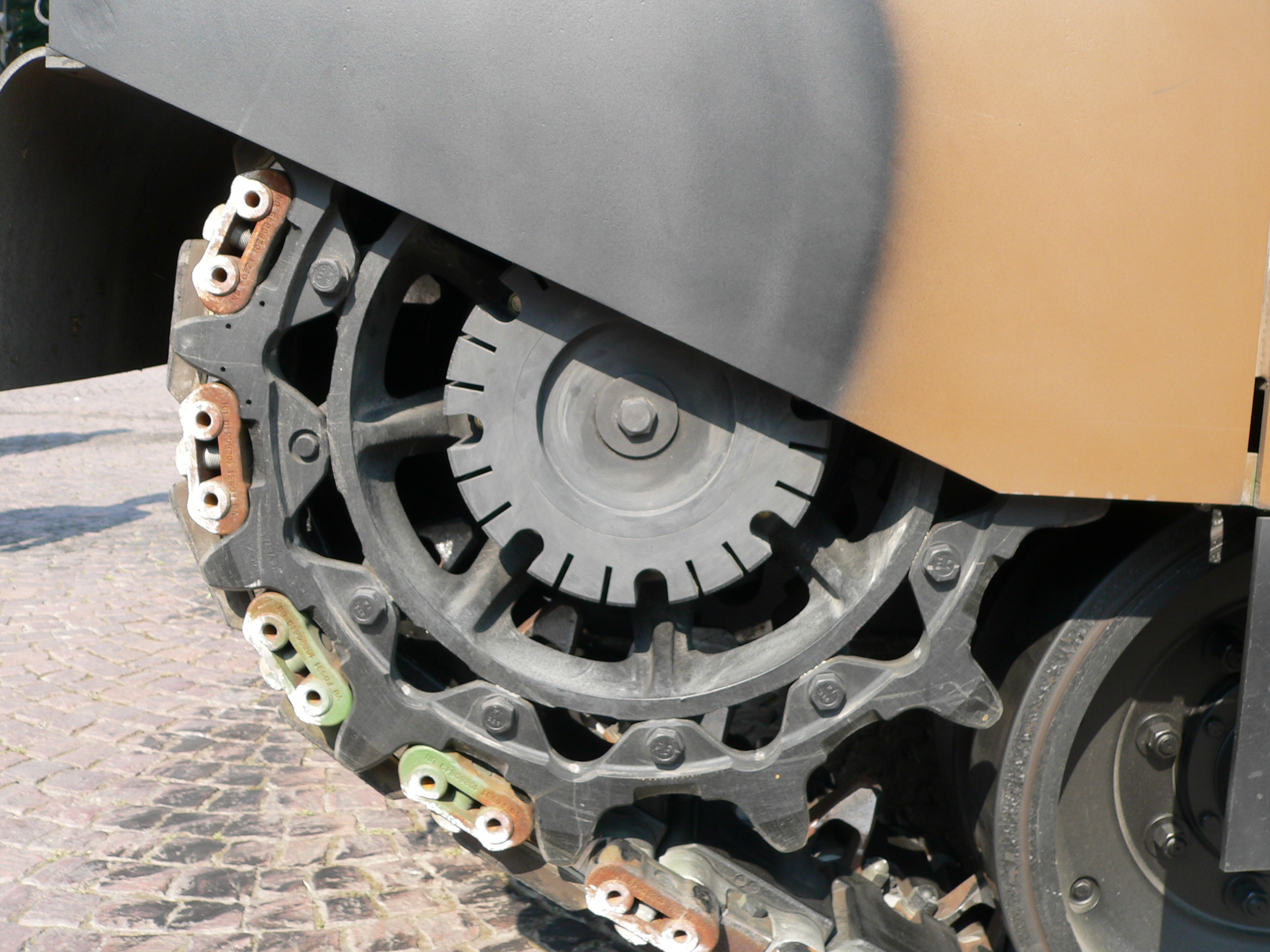
Chain track drive sprocket (Leclerc battle tank, 2006)

In the case of vehicles with caterpillar tracks the engine-driven toothed-wheel transmitting motion to the tracks is known as the drive sprocket and may be positioned at the front or back of the vehicle, or in some cases both. There may also be a third sprocket, elevated, driving the track.

== Film and paper ==
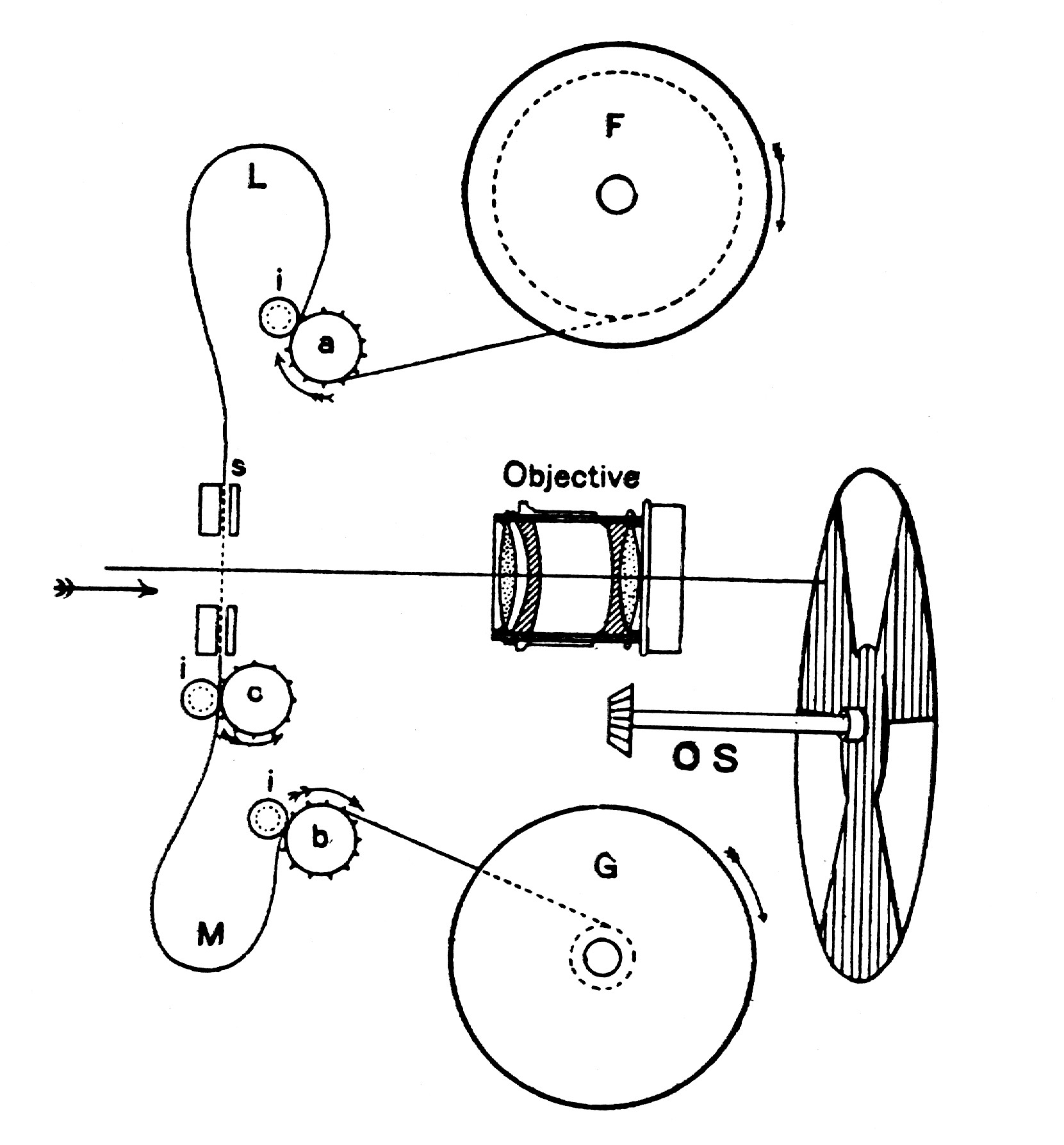
Moving picture mechanism from 1914. The sprocket wheels a, b, and c engage and transport the film. a and b move with uniform velocity and c indexes each frame of the film into place for projection.

Sprockets are used in the film transport mechanisms of movie projectors and movie cameras. In this case, the sprocket wheels engage film perforations in the film stock. Sprocket feed was also used for punched tape and is used for paper feed to some computer printers.

== See also ==
- Bicycle chain
- Bicycle gearing
- Chain drive
- Cogset (as used in bicycle gearing)
- Gear train
- Glossary of cycling
- Mechanical advantage
- Rack and pinion
- Roller chain (or "sprocket chain")
- Toad the Wet Sprocket
- Toothed belt
