= Roller chain =

Type of chain drive

Roller chain and sprocket

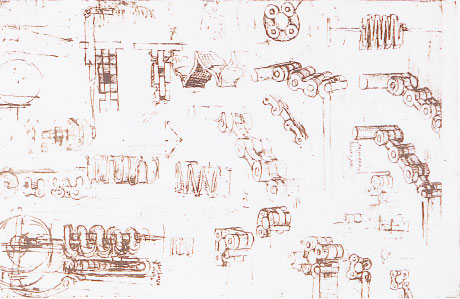
The sketch of roller chain, Leonardo da Vinci, Codex Atlanticus

Roller chain or bush roller chain is the type of chain drive most commonly used for transmission of mechanical power on many kinds of domestic, industrial and agricultural machinery, including conveyors, wire- and tube-drawing machines, printing presses, cars, motorcycles, and bicycles. It consists of a series of short cylindrical rollers held together by side links. It is driven by a toothed wheel called a sprocket. It is a simple, reliable, and efficient means of power transmission.

Sketches by Leonardo da Vinci in the 16th century show a chain with a roller bearing. In 1800, James Fussell patented a roller chain on development of his balance lock and in 1880 Hans Renold patented a bush roller chain.

== Construction ==
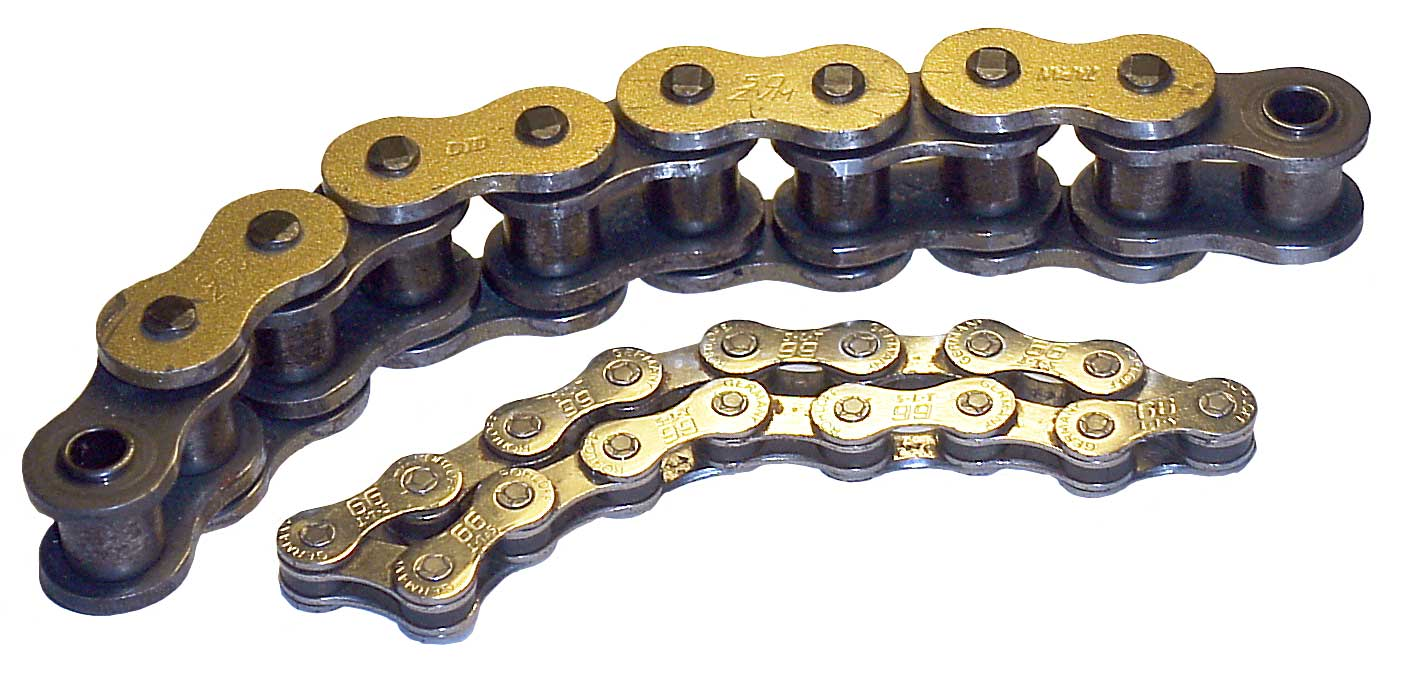
Two different sizes of roller chain, showing construction.

There are two types of links alternating in the bush roller chain. The first type is inner links, having two inner plates held together by two sleeves or bushings upon which rotate two rollers. Inner links alternate with the second type, the outer links, consisting of two outer plates held together by pins passing through the bushings of the inner links. The "bushingless" roller chain is similar in operation though not in construction; instead of separate bushings or sleeves holding the inner plates together, the plate has a tube stamped into it protruding from the hole which serves the same purpose. This has the advantage of removing one step in assembly of the chain.

The roller chain design reduces friction compared to simpler designs, resulting in higher efficiency and less wear. The original power transmission chain varieties lacked rollers and bushings, with both the inner and outer plates held by pins which directly contacted the sprocket teeth; however this configuration exhibited extremely rapid wear of both the sprocket teeth and the plates where they pivoted on the pins. This problem was partially solved by the development of bushed chains, with the pins holding the outer plates passing through bushings or sleeves connecting the inner plates. This distributed the wear over a greater area; however the teeth of the sprockets still wore more rapidly than is desirable, from the sliding friction against the bushings. The addition of rollers surrounding the bushing sleeves of the chain and provided rolling contact with the teeth of the sprockets resulting in excellent resistance to wear of both sprockets and chain as well. There is even very low friction, as long as the chain is sufficiently lubricated. Continuous, clean, lubrication of roller chains is of primary importance for efficient operation, as is correct tensioning.

== Lubrication ==
Many driving chains (for example, in factory equipment, or driving a camshaft inside an internal combustion engine) operate in clean environments, and thus the wearing surfaces (that is, the pins and bushings) are safe from precipitation and airborne grit, many even in a sealed environment such as an oil bath. Some roller chains are designed to have o-rings built into the space between the outside link plate and the inside roller link plates. Chain manufacturers began to include this feature in 1971 after the application was invented by Joseph Montano while working for Whitney Chain of Hartford, Connecticut. O-rings were included as a way to improve lubrication to the links of power transmission chains, a service that is vitally important to extending their working life. These rubber fixtures form a barrier that holds factory applied lubricating grease inside the pin and bushing wear areas. Further, the rubber o-rings prevent dirt and other contaminants from entering inside the chain linkages, where such particles would otherwise cause significant wear.

There are also many chains that have to operate in dirty conditions, and for size or operational reasons cannot be sealed. Examples include chains on farm equipment, bicycles, and chain saws. These chains will necessarily have relatively high rates of wear.

Many oil-based lubricants attract dirt and other particles, eventually forming an abrasive paste that will compound wear on chains. This problem can be reduced by use of a "dry" PTFE spray, which forms a solid film after application and repels both particles and moisture.

=== Motorcycle chain lubrication ===
Chains operating at high speeds comparable to those on motorcycles should be used in conjunction with an oil bath. For modern motorcycles this is not possible, and most motorcycle chains run unprotected. Thus, motorcycle chains tend to wear very quickly relative to other applications. They are subject to extreme forces and are exposed to rain, dirt, sand and road salt.

Motorcycle chains are part of the drive train to transmit the motor power to the back wheel. Properly lubricated chains can reach an efficiency of 98% or greater in the transmission. Unlubricated chains will significantly decrease performance and increase chain and sprocket wear.

Two types of aftermarket lubricants are available for motorcycle chains: spray on lubricants and oil drip feed systems.

- Spray lubricants may contain wax or PTFE. While these lubricants use tack additives to stay on the chain they can also attract dirt and sand from the road and over time produce a grinding paste that accelerates component wear.
- Oil drip feed systems continuously lubricate the chain and use light oil that does not stick to the chain. Research has shown that oil drip feed systems provide the greatest wear protection and greatest power saving.

== Variants ==
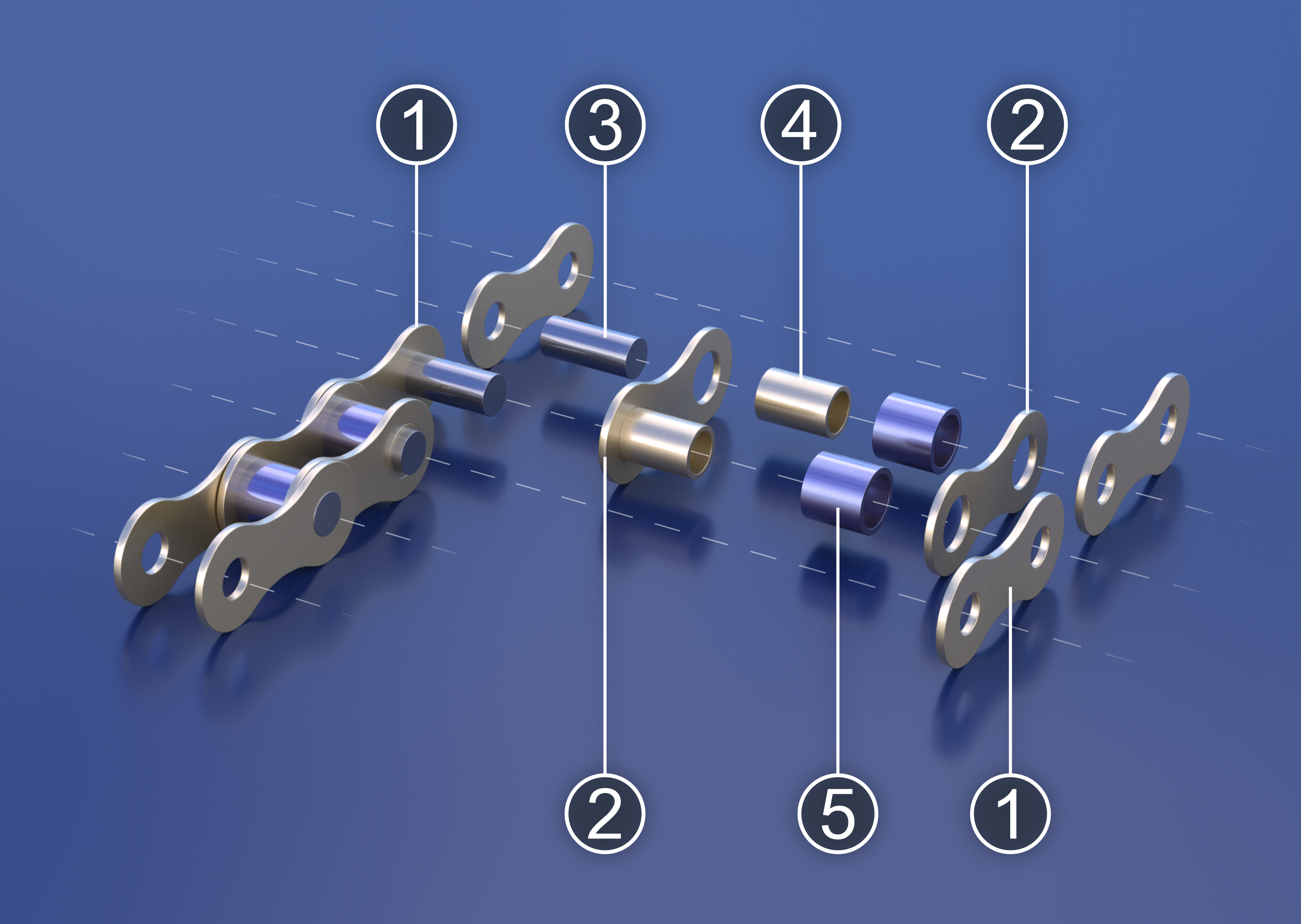
Layout of a roller chain: 1. Outer plate, 2. Inner plate, 3. Pin, 4. Bushing, 5. Roller

If the chain is not being used for a high wear application (for instance if it is just transmitting motion from a hand-operated lever to a control shaft on a machine, or a sliding door on an oven), then one of the simpler types of chain may still be used. Conversely, where extra strength but the smooth drive of a smaller pitch is required, the chain may be "siamesed"; instead of just two rows of plates on the outer sides of the chain, there may be three ("duplex"), four ("triplex"), or more rows of plates running parallel, with bushings and rollers between each adjacent pair, and the same number of rows of teeth running in parallel on the sprockets to match. Timing chains on automotive engines, for example, typically have multiple rows of plates called strands.

Roller chain is made in several sizes, the most common American National Standards Institute (ANSI) standards being 40, 50, 60, and 80. The first digits indicate the pitch of the chain in eighths of an inch, with the last digit being 0 for standard chain, 1 for lightweight chain, and 5 for bushed chain with no rollers. Thus, a chain with half-inch pitch is a No. 40 while a No. 160 sprocket has teeth spaced 2 inches apart, etc. Metric pitches are expressed in sixteenths of an inch; thus a metric No. 8 chain (08B-1) is equivalent to an ANSI No. 40. Most roller chain is made from plain carbon or alloy steel, but stainless steel is used in food processing machinery or other places where lubrication is a problem, and nylon or brass are occasionally seen for the same reason.

Roller chain is ordinarily hooked up using a master link (also known as a "connecting link"), which typically has one pin held by a horseshoe clip rather than friction fit, allowing it to be inserted or removed with simple tools. Chain with a removable link or pin is also known as "cottered chain", which allows the length of the chain to be adjusted. Half links (also known as "offsets") are available and are used to increase the length of the chain by a single roller. Riveted roller chain has the master link (also known as a "connecting link") "riveted" or mashed on the ends. These pins are made to be durable and are not removable.

=== Horseshoe clip ===
A horseshoe clip is the U-shaped spring steel fitting that holds the side-plate of the joining (or "master") link formerly essential to complete the loop of a roller chain. The clip method is losing popularity as more and more chains are manufactured as endless loops not intended for maintenance. Modern motorcycles are often fitted with an endless chain but in the increasingly rare circumstances of the chain wearing out and needing to be replaced, a length of chain and a joining link (with horseshoe clip) will be provided as a spare. Changes in motorcycle suspension are tending to make this use less prevalent.

Common on older motorcycles and older bicycles (e.g. those with hub gears) this clip method cannot be used on bicycles fitted with derailleur gears, as the clip will tend to catch on the gear-changers.

In many cases, an endless chain cannot be replaced easily since it is linked into the frame of the machine (this is the case on the traditional bicycle, amongst other places). However, in some cases, a joining link with horseshoe clip cannot be used or is not preferred in the application either. In this case, a "soft link" is used, placed with a chain riveter and relying solely on friction. With modern materials and tools and skilled application this is a permanent repair having almost the same strength and life of the unbroken chain.

== Use ==
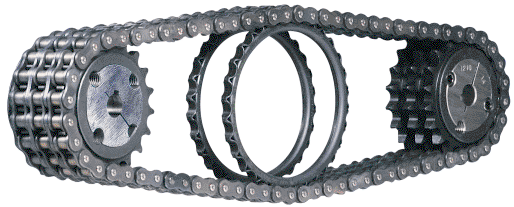
An example of two 'ghost' sprockets tensioning a triplex roller chain system

- Roller chains are used in low- to mid-speed drives at around 600 to 800 feet per minute; however, at higher speeds, around 2,000 to 3,000 feet per minute, V-belts are normally used due to wear and noise issues.
- A bicycle chain is a roller chain. Bicycle chains may have a master link, or may require a chain tool for removal and installation. A similar but larger and thus stronger chain is used on most motorcycles although it is sometimes replaced by either a toothed belt or a shaft drive, which offer lower noise level and fewer maintenance requirements.
- A timing chain is a roller chain used in some internal combustion automobile engines to drive a camshaft. Very high performance engines often use gear drive, and starting in the early 1960s toothed belts were used by some manufacturers.

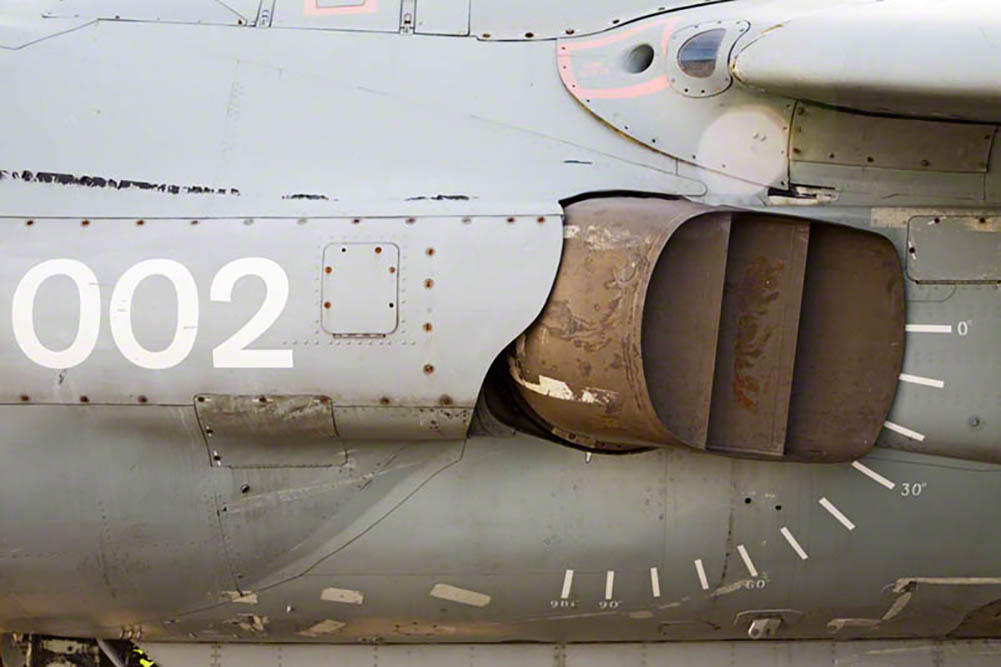
Sea Harrier FA.2 ZA195 front (cold) vector thrust nozzle - the nozzle is rotated by a chain drive from an air motor

- The Harrier jump jet uses a roller chain driven by an air motor to rotate its engine nozzles to create its unique "thrust vectoring" propulsion, which point downwards for hovering flight, and to the rear for normal forward flight.

=== Leaf chain ===
A leaf chain is similar to but not the same as a roller chain. Leaf chains resemble roller chains, and are used in:

- Forklifts as a pulley to raise and lower their fork carriage
- Chainsaws as cutting chains, which superficially resemble roller chains but are more closely related to the leaf chain. They are driven by projecting drive links which also serve to locate the chain onto the bar.

== Wear ==
The effect of wear on a roller chain is to increase the pitch (spacing of the links), causing the chain to grow longer. Note that this is due to wear at the pivoting pins and bushes, not from actual stretching of the metal (as does happen to some flexible steel components such as the hand-brake cable of a motor vehicle).

With modern chains it is unusual for a chain (other than that of a bicycle) to wear until it breaks, since a worn chain leads to the rapid onset of wear on the teeth of the sprockets, with ultimate failure being the loss of all the teeth on the sprocket. The sprockets (in particular the smaller of the two) suffer a grinding motion that puts a characteristic hook shape into the driven face of the teeth. (This effect is made worse by a chain improperly tensioned, but is unavoidable no matter what care is taken). The worn teeth (and chain) no longer provides smooth transmission of power and this may become evident from the noise, the vibration or (in car engines using a timing chain) the variation in ignition timing seen with a timing light. Both sprockets and chain should be replaced in these cases, since a new chain on worn sprockets will not last long. However, in less severe cases it may be possible to save the larger of the two sprockets, since it is always the smaller one that suffers the most wear. Only in very light-weight applications such as a bicycle, or in extreme cases of improper tension, will the chain normally jump off the sprockets.

The lengthening due to wear of a chain is calculated by the following formula:

$\%=((M-(S*P))/(S*P))*100$

M = the length of a number of links measured

S = the number of links measured

P = Pitch

In industry, it is usual to monitor the movement of the chain tensioner (whether manual or automatic) or the exact length of a drive chain (one rule of thumb is to replace a roller chain which has elongated 3% on an adjustable drive or 1.5% on a fixed-center drive). A simpler method, particularly suitable for the cycle or motorcycle user, is to attempt to pull the chain away from the larger of the two sprockets, whilst ensuring the chain is taut. Any significant movement (e.g. making it possible to see through a gap) probably indicates a chain worn up to and beyond the limit. Sprocket damage will result if the problem is ignored. Sprocket wear cancels this effect, and may mask chain wear.

=== Bicycle chain wear ===
The lightweight chain of a bicycle with derailleur gears can snap (or rather, come apart at the side-plates, since it is normal for the "riveting" to fail first) because the pins inside are not cylindrical, they are barrel-shaped. Contact between the pin and the bushing is not the regular line, but a point which allows the chain's pins to work its way through the bushing, and finally the roller, ultimately causing the chain to snap. This form of construction is necessary because the gear-changing action of this form of transmission requires the chain to both bend sideways and to twist, but this can occur with the flexibility of such a narrow chain and relatively large free lengths on a bicycle.

Chain failure is much less of a problem on hub-geared systems since the chainline does not bend, so the parallel pins have a much bigger wearing surface in contact with the bush. The hub-gear system also allows complete enclosure, a great aid to lubrication and protection from grit.

== Chain strength ==
The most common measure of roller chain's strength is tensile strength. Tensile strength represents how much load a chain can withstand under a one-time load before breaking. Just as important as tensile strength is a chain's fatigue strength. The critical factors in a chain's fatigue strength is the quality of steel used to manufacture the chain, the heat treatment of the chain components, the quality of the pitch hole fabrication of the linkplates, and the type of shot plus the intensity of shot peen coverage on the linkplates. Other factors can include the thickness of the linkplates and the design (contour) of the linkplates. The rule of thumb for roller chain operating on a continuous drive is for the chain load to not exceed a mere 1/6 or 1/9 of the chain's tensile strength, depending on the type of master links used (press-fit vs. slip-fit). Roller chains operating on a continuous drive beyond these thresholds can and typically do fail prematurely via linkplate fatigue failure.

The standard minimum ultimate strength of the ANSI 29.1 steel chain is 12,500 x (pitch, in inches)^{2}. X-ring and O-Ring chains greatly decrease wear by means of internal lubricants, increasing chain life. The internal lubrication is inserted by means of a vacuum when riveting the chain together.

== Chain standards ==
Standards organizations (such as ANSI and ISO) maintain standards for design, dimensions, and interchangeability of transmission chains. For example, the following table shows data from ANSI standard B29.1-2011 (precision power transmission roller chains, attachments, and sprockets) developed by the American Society of Mechanical Engineers (ASME). See the references for additional information.

ASME/ANSI B29.1-2011 Roller chain standard sizes
Size	Pitch	Maximum roller diameter	Minimum ultimate tensile strength	Measuring load
25	0.250 in (6.35 mm)	0.130 in (3.30 mm)	780 lb (350 kg)	18 lb (8.2 kg)
35	0.375 in (9.53 mm)	0.200 in (5.08 mm)	1,760 lb (800 kg)	18 lb (8.2 kg)
41	0.500 in (12.70 mm)	0.306 in (7.77 mm)	1,500 lb (680 kg)	18 lb (8.2 kg)
40	0.500 in (12.70 mm)	0.312 in (7.92 mm)	3,125 lb (1,417 kg)	31 lb (14 kg)
50	0.625 in (15.88 mm)	0.400 in (10.16 mm)	4,880 lb (2,210 kg)	49 lb (22 kg)
60	0.750 in (19.05 mm)	0.469 in (11.91 mm)	7,030 lb (3,190 kg)	70 lb (32 kg)
80	1.000 in (25.40 mm)	0.625 in (15.88 mm)	12,500 lb (5,700 kg)	125 lb (57 kg)
100	1.250 in (31.75 mm)	0.750 in (19.05 mm)	19,531 lb (8,859 kg)	195 lb (88 kg)
120	1.500 in (38.10 mm)	0.875 in (22.23 mm)	28,125 lb (12,757 kg)	281 lb (127 kg)
140	1.750 in (44.45 mm)	1.000 in (25.40 mm)	38,280 lb (17,360 kg)	383 lb (174 kg)
160	2.000 in (50.80 mm)	1.125 in (28.58 mm)	50,000 lb (23,000 kg)	500 lb (230 kg)
180	2.250 in (57.15 mm)	1.460 in (37.08 mm)	63,280 lb (28,700 kg)	633 lb (287 kg)
200	2.500 in (63.50 mm)	1.562 in (39.67 mm)	78,175 lb (35,460 kg)	781 lb (354 kg)
240	3.000 in (76.20 mm)	1.875 in (47.63 mm)	112,500 lb (51,000 kg)	1,000 lb (450 kg)

For mnemonic purposes, below is another presentation of key dimensions from the same standard, expressed in fractions of an inch (which was part of the thinking behind the choice of preferred numbers in the ANSI standard):

Pitch (inches)	Pitch expressed in eighths	ANSI standard chain number	Width (inches)
1/4	2/8	25	1/8
3/8	3/8	35	3/16
1/2	4/8	41	1/4
1/2	4/8	40	5/16
5/8	5/8	50	3/8
3/4	6/8	60	1/2
1	8/8	80	5/8
Notes: *The pitch is the distance between roller centers. The width is the distance between the link plates (i.e. slightly more than the roller width to allow for clearance). *The right-hand digit of the standard denotes 0 = normal chain, 1 = lightweight chain, 5 = rollerless bushing chain. *The left-hand digit denotes the number of eighths of an inch that make up the pitch. *An "H" following the standard number denotes heavyweight chain. A hyphenated number following the standard number denotes double-strand (2), triple-strand (3), and so on. Thus 60H-3 denotes 3/4 inch pitch heavyweight triple-strand chain.

A typical bicycle chain (for derailleur gears) uses narrow 1/2-inch-pitch chain. The width of the chain is variable, and does not affect the load capacity. The more sprockets at the rear wheel (historically 3–6, nowadays 7–12 sprockets), the narrower the chain. Chains are sold according to the number of speeds they are designed to work with, for example, "10 speed chain". Hub gear or single speed bicycles use 1/2 x 1/8 inch chains, where 1/8 inch refers to the maximum thickness of a sprocket that can be used with the chain.

Typically chains with parallel shaped links have an even number of links, with each narrow link followed by a broad one. Chains built up with a uniform type of link, narrow at one and broad at the other end, can be made with an odd number of links, which can be an advantage to adapt to a special chainwheel-distance; on the other side such a chain tends to be not so strong.

Roller chains made using ISO standard are sometimes called "isochains".

== See also ==
- Self-lubricating chain

== Bibliography ==
- Oberg, Erik; Jones, Franklin D.; Horton, Holbrook L.; Ryffel, Henry H. (1996), Green, Robert E.; McCauley, Christopher J. (eds.), Machinery's Handbook (25th ed.), New York: Industrial Press, ISBN 978-0-8311-2575-2, OCLC 473691581.
