= Archie (disambiguation) =

Archie is a given name or nickname. It may also refer to:

== Arts, entertainment, and media ==
- Archie Comics, a comic book publisher
  - Archie (comic book), a series featuring the character Archie Andrews
  - Archie (comic strip)
  - Archie: To Riverdale and Back Again, a 1990 TV film
- Archie (short for Archimedes), a flying ship in the Watchmen series
- Archie, a 1964 TV comedy film directed by Gene Nelson
- Archie (TV series), a 2023 TV drama about the life of Cary Grant

== Computing and technology ==
- Archie (Linux), a version of Arch Linux
- Archie (robot), a humanoid robot
- Archie, informal term for the Acorn Archimedes computer
- Archie (search engine), a search engine for FTP sites

== Places ==
- Archie, Michigan, a ghost town in the United States
- Archie, Missouri, a city in the United States
- Rural Municipality of Archie, a former municipality in Manitoba, Canada

== Surname ==
- Bryce Archie (born 2004), American football and baseball player
- Dominique Archie (born 1987), American basketball player
- George Archie (1914–2001), American baseball player
- Ivor Archie, Chief Justice of Trinidad and Tobago (as of 2008), former Solicitor General and Attorney General of the Cayman Islands

== Other uses ==
- Anti-aircraft fire, referred to as "archie" by the British Royal Flying Corps and Royal Air Force
- Archie (squid), a giant squid preserved in the Natural History Museum in London
- Archie (meteorite), a meteorite which fell in Missouri, United States in 1932
- Mixed Martial Archie, a ring name of professional wrestler Robert Evans (wrestler) (born 1983)

== See also ==
- Archie's law, in petrophysics
- Archy (disambiguation)
