= AICTA LMD 416-00R =

Czech aircraft engine

LMD 416-00R
- Type: Aircraft engine
- National origin: Czech Republic
- Manufacturer: AICTA Design Work, s.r.o.

The AICTA LMD 416-00R is a Czech aircraft engine, that was designed and produced by AICTA Design Work of Prague for use in light aircraft.

The company seems to have been founded about 2012 and gone out of business in 2016.

== Design and development ==
The engine is a four-cylinder horizontally-opposed, 1,600 cc (97.6 cu in) displacement, air and liquid-cooled, diesel engine design, with a helical gear mechanical gearbox-style of reduction drive with reduction ratio of 1.6:1. It produces 120 hp (89 kW) at 3950 rpm, with a compression ratio of 18:1.

The engine can run on diesel fuel or Jet A-1.

== Specifications (LMD 416-00R) ==
Data from Tacke

=== General characteristics ===
- Type: Four-cylinder, diesel aircraft engine
- Bore: 80 mm (3.1 in)
- Stroke: 80 mm (3.1 in)
- Displacement: 1,600 cc (97.6 cu in)
- Dry weight: 82 kg (180.8 lb)

=== Components ===
- Fuel type: petrol
- Cooling system: liquid and air
- Reduction gear: helical gear mechanical gearbox. 1.6:1

=== Performance ===
- Power output: 120 hp (89 kW)
- Compression ratio: 18:1

== See also ==
Related lists

- List of aircraft engines
