= Zanzottera MZ 313 =

Italian two-stroke aircraft engine

MZ 313
- Type: Aircraft engine
- National origin: Italy
- Manufacturer: Zanzottera Technologies

The Zanzottera MZ 313 is an Italian aircraft engine, designed for use in ultralight aircraft.

The engine was originally designed and produced by Zanzottera Technologies of Italy, but the design was sold, along with the rest of the company's two-stroke ultralight aircraft engine line to Compact Radial Engines of Surrey, British Columbia, Canada. As of March 2018, the engine was not offered for sale by Compact Radial Engines. Compact Radial Engines was then in turn acquired by Fiate Aviation Co., Ltd. of Hefei, Anhui, China in August 2017. Fiate Aviation did not advertise the engine as available in 2021.

== Design and development ==
The engine is a single-cylinder two-stroke, 313 cc (19.1 cu in) displacement, air-cooled, gasoline engine design, with a poly V belt reduction drive with reduction ratios of 2.24 and 2.34. It employs electronic ignition and produces 30 hp (22 kW) at 6250 rpm.

== Specifications (MZ 313) ==
Data from Tacke

=== General characteristics ===
- Type: Single-cylinder, two stroke aircraft engine
- Bore: 76 mm (3.0 in)
- Stroke: 69 mm (2.7 in)
- Displacement: 313 cc (19.1 cu in)
- Length: 301 mm (11.9 in)
- Width: 198 mm (7.8 in)
- Height: 338 mm (13.3 in)
- Dry weight: 17 kg (37.5 lb)

=== Components ===
- Fuel type: gasoline
- Cooling system: air
- Reduction gear: poly V belt

=== Performance ===
- Power output: 30 hp (22 kW)

== See also ==
Related lists

- List of aircraft engines
