= Archy =

Archy may refer to:

- Archy (software), a software system
- Archy (character), fictional cockroach of Archy and Mehitabel
- Sir Archy (1805–1833), American Thoroughbred racehorse

== See also ==
- Archie (disambiguation)
- Archy Kirkwood, a British politician
- Archy Lee, an African-American born into slavery in Mississippi
- Archy Marshall, a British musician better known as King Krule
- Archy McNally, title character in a series of novels by Lawrence Sanders
