= The Timothy Files =

First edition

The Timothy Files is a 1987 best selling work of fiction by Lawrence Sanders. It consists of linked stories featuring Timothy Cone, a former Marine who fought in Vietnam and works as a hard-boiled type investigator. He is a scruffy character, rough of mouth and demeanor, but pure of heart. Cone has trouble with relationships, surviving on a rough-edged ongoing affair with his supervisor, and an only slightly softer relationship with his cat Cleo. The stories in the book deal with his successful attempts to uncover the truth and bring villains to justice.
