= De gustibus non est disputandum =

Latin maxim that there is no accounting for taste

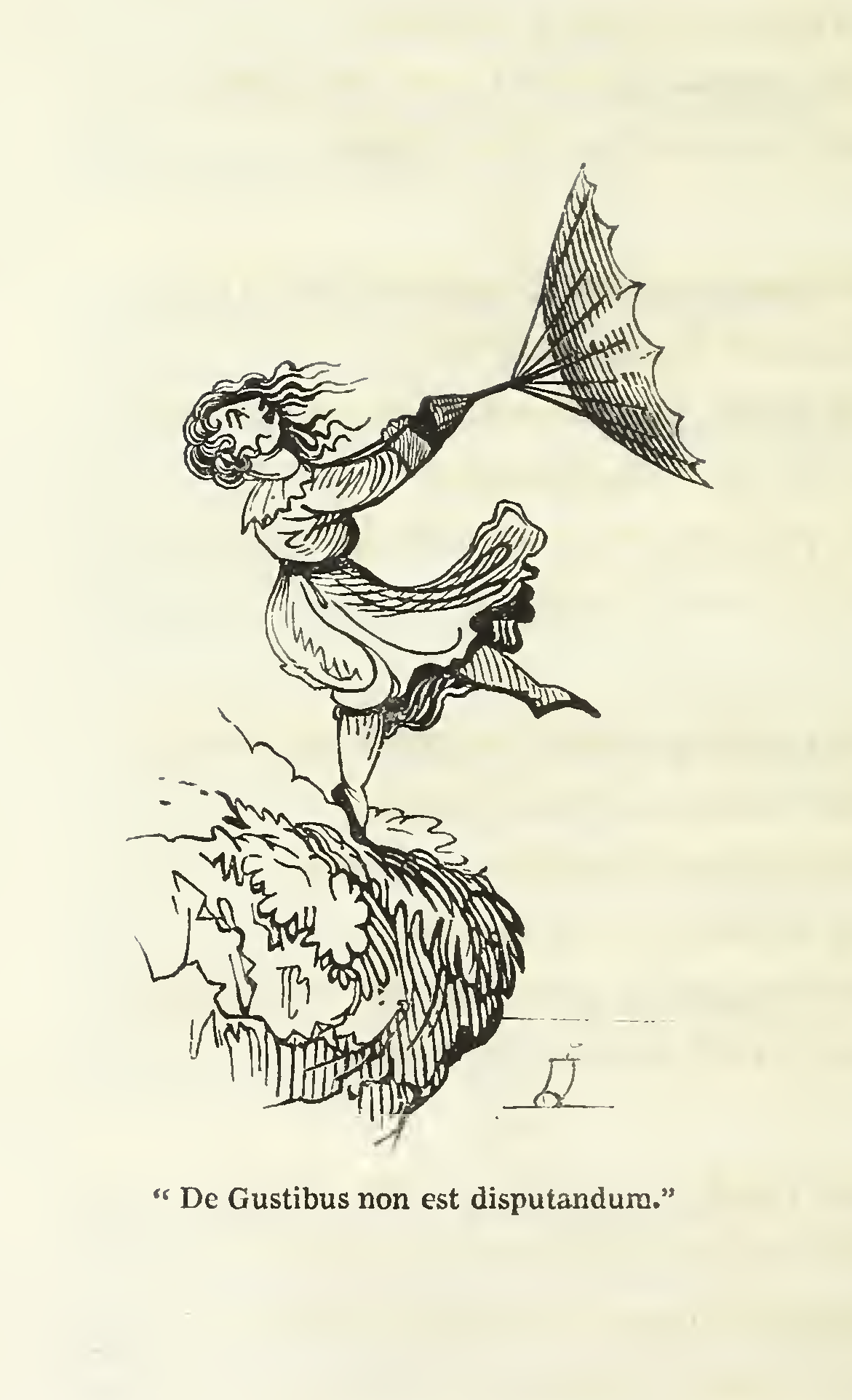

De gustibus non est disputandum, or de gustibus non disputandum est, is a Latin maxim meaning "In matters of taste, there can be no disputes" (literally: "about tastes, it is not to be disputed"). An equivalent English proverb is that "There is no accounting for tastes" or "taste". A similar expression in French is: à chacun son goût ("to each their own taste").

== Origin ==
One known early use of the phrase is in a 17th century legal text: Repetitio legis Imperialem de prohibita feudi alienat. per Fridericum: cum summariis & indice locupletissimo, by Horatius Montanus (Naples, Secondino Roncagliolo, 1628). Montanus gives the example of a vassal's duty to his lord, and considers whether the vassal discharges his duty if he disobeys his lord's instructions to purchase a particular house but instead buys another house of much greater value for the same price. He concludes that you cannot legally argue whether the vassal has discharged his duty until you know the lord's attitude to the decision—because no legal argument can be made about what people may prefer.

The phrase is misquoted in Act I of Anton Chehov play The Seagull. The character Shamrayev conflates it with the phrase de mortuis nil nisi bonum (in its alternative form: de mortuis, aut bene aut nihil: "of the dead, either [speak] good or [say] nothing"), resulting in de gustibus aut bene, aut nihil — "Let nothing be said of taste but what is good."

== See also ==
- List of Latin phrases
- List of proverbial phrases
