= Reduction drive =

Mechanical device to shift rotational speed

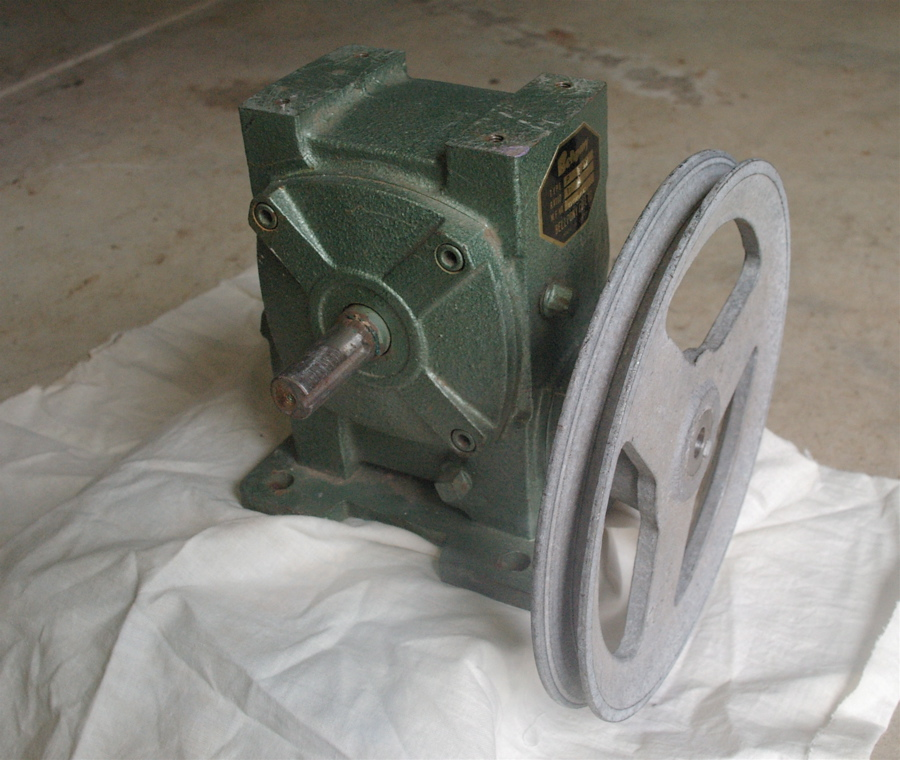
Reduction drive (also with a transformation of the direction of rotation)

A reduction drive is a mechanical device to shift rotational speed. A planetary reduction drive is a small scale version using ball bearings in an epicyclic arrangement instead of toothed gears.

Reduction drives are used in engines of all kinds to increase the amount of torque per revolution of a shaft: the gearbox of any car is a ubiquitous example of a reduction drive. Common household uses are washing machines, food blenders and window-winders. Reduction drives are also used to decrease the rotational speed of an input shaft to an appropriate output speed. Reduction drives can be a gear train design or belt driven.Planetary reduction drives are typically attached between the shaft of the variable capacitor and the tuning knob of any radio, to allow fine adjustments of the tuning capacitor with smooth movements of the knob. Planetary drives are used in this situation to avoid "backlash", which makes tuning easier. If the capacitor drive has backlash, when one attempts to tune in a station, the tuning knob will feel sloppy and it will be hard to perform small adjustments. Gear-drives can be made to have no backlash by using split gears and spring tension but the shaft bearings have to be very precise.

== Application ==
=== Reduction gear in light aircraft ===
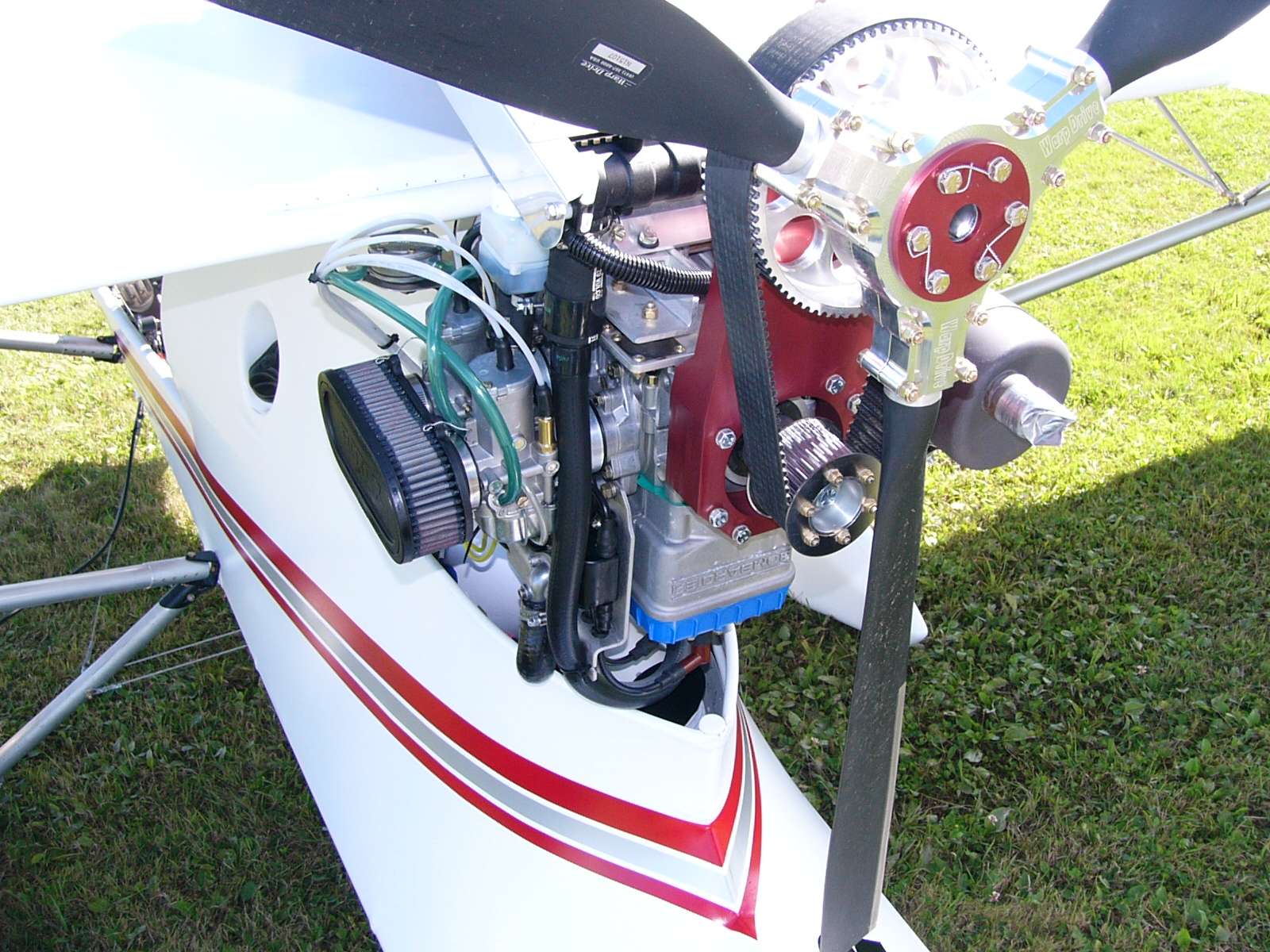
Rotax 582 pusher installation on a Quad City Challenger II, showing a toothed-belt reduction drive.

Piston-engined light aircraft may have direct-drive to the propeller or may use a reduction drive. The advantages of direct-drive are simplicity, lightness and reliability, but a direct-drive engine may never achieve full output, as the propeller might exceed its maximum permissible rpm. For instance, a direct-drive aero engine (such as the Jabiru 2200) has a nominal maximum output of 64 kW (85 bhp) at 3,300 RPM, but if the propeller cannot exceed 2,600 rpm, the maximum output would be only about 70 bhp. By contrast, a Rotax 912 has an engine capacity of only 56% of the Jabiru 2200, but its reduction gear (of 1 : 2.273 or 1 : 2.43) allows the full output of 80 bhp to be exploited. The Midwest twin-rotor wankel engine has an eccentric shaft that spins up to 7,800 rpm, so a 2.96:1 reduction gear is used.

Aero-engine reduction gears are typically of the gear type, but smaller two-stroke engines such as the Rotax 582 use belt drive with toothed belts, which is a cheap and lightweight option with built-in damping of power surges.

=== Reduction Drives on Marine Vessels ===
Most of the world's ships are powered by diesel engines which can be split into three categories, low speed (<400 rpm), medium speed (400-1200 rpm), and high speed (1200+ rpm). Low speed diesels operate at speeds within the optimum range for propeller usage. Thus it is acceptable to directly transmit power from the engine to the propeller. For medium and high speed diesels, the rotational speed of the crankshaft within the engine must be reduced in order to reach the optimum speed for use by a propeller.

Reduction drives operate by making the engine turn a high speed pinion against a gear, turning the high rotational speed from the engine to lower rotational speed for the propeller. The amount of reduction is based on the number of teeth on each gear. For example, a pinion with 25 teeth, turning a gear with 100 teeth, must turn 4 times in order for the larger gear to turn once. This reduces the speed by a factor of 4 while raising the torque 4 fold. This reduction factor changes depending on the needs and operating speeds of the machinery. The reduction gear aboard the Training Ship Golden Bear has a ratio of 3.6714:1. So when the two Enterprise R5 V-16 diesel engines operate at their standard 514 rpm, the propeller turns at 140 rpm.

A large variety of reduction gear arrangements are used in the industry. The three arrangements most commonly used are: double reduction utilizing two pinion nested, double reduction utilizing two-pinion articulated, and double reduction utilizing two-pinion locked train.

The gears used in a ship's reduction gearbox are usually double helical gears. This design helps lower the amount of required maintenance and increase the lifetime of the gears. Helical gears are used because the load upon it is more distributed than in other types. The double helical gear set can also be called a herringbone gear and consists of two oppositely angled sets of teeth. A single set of helical teeth will produce a thrust parallel to the axle of the gear (known as axial thrust) due to the angular nature of the teeth. By adding a second set opposed to the first set, the axial thrust created by both sets cancels each other out.

When installing reduction gears on ships the alignment of the gear is critical. Correct alignment helps ensure a uniform distribution of load upon each pinion and gear. When manufactured, the gears are assembled in such a way as to obtain uniform load distribution and tooth contact. After completion of construction and delivery to shipyard it is required that these gears achieve proper alignment when first operated under load. Some shipbuilders will have the gears transported and installed as a complete assembly. Others will have the gears dismantled, shipped, reassembled in their shops and lowered as a complete assembly into the ship. While finally others will have the gears dismantled, shipped and reassembled in the ship. These three methods are the most common used by shipbuilders to achieve proper alignment and each of them work based upon the assumption that proper alignment was correctly achieved at the manufacturer.

Because of the involvement in the process of aligning reduction drives, there are two main sources of responsibility to achieve proper alignment. That of the shipbuilder and that of the gear manufacturer. The shipbuilder must provide a foundation that is sufficiently strong and rigid so that the gear mounting surface does not deflect greatly under operating conditions, a shaft alignment drawing that details the positions of line bearing and the method for aligning the forward piece of line shafting to the reduction gear coupling and the location of stern tube being such that the normal wear down of the stern tube will not induce significant movement of the reduction gear coupling from its proper alignment.

The gear manufacturer is then responsible for ensuring basic gear alignment, such that the final assembly measurements are taken carefully and recorded for the reduction drive to be installed correctly, proper tooth contact in the factory, where the manufacturer accurately and precisely assembles the gears and pinions, and denoting all steps performed, making measurements of parts at the different steps and final assembly then forwarding this data to the shipbuilder so that they may assure the degree of accuracy required by the gear designer in the resulting shipboard assembly.

Thrust bearings do not commonly appear on reduction drives on ships because axial loading is handled by a thrust bearing separate from the reduction drive assembly. But on smaller reduction drives attached to auxiliary machinery or if the design of the ship demands it, one can find thrust bearings as a part of the assembly.

In order to ensure a reduction drive's smooth working and long lifetime, it is vital to have lubricating oil. A reduction drive that is run with oil free of impurities like water, dirt, grit and flakes of metal, requires little care in comparison to other type of engine room machinery. In order to ensure that the lube oil in the reduction gears stay this way a lube oil purifier will be installed with the drive.

== Types ==
Types of reduction drives include cycloidal, strain wave gear, and worm gear drives.
