= The Anderson Tapes =

1971 film by Sidney Lumet

- original film poster
- Directed by: Sidney Lumet
- Screenplay by: Frank Pierson
- Based on: The Anderson Tapes; 1970 novel by Lawrence Sanders
- Produced by: Robert M. Weitman
- Starring: Sean Connery; Dyan Cannon; Martin Balsam; Alan King
- Cinematography: Arthur J. Ornitz
- Edited by: Joanne Burke
- Music by: Quincy Jones
- Production company: Robert M. Weitman Productions
- Distributed by: Columbia Pictures
- Release date: June 17, 1971
- Running time: 99 minutes
- Country: United States
- Language: English
- Budget: $3 million
- Box office: $5 million (US/Canada)

The Anderson Tapes is a 1971 American crime film directed by Sidney Lumet and starring Sean Connery and featuring Dyan Cannon, Martin Balsam, Ralph Meeker, Garrett Morris, Margaret Hamilton, and Alan King. The screenplay by Frank Pierson was based on the 1970 epistolary novel of the same name by Lawrence Sanders, which consists primarily of transcripts of tape recordings. The film is scored by Quincy Jones and marks the feature film debut of Christopher Walken.

It was the first major film to focus on the pervasiveness of electronic surveillance, from security cameras in public places to hidden recording devices.

== Plot ==
Safe-cracker John "Duke" Anderson is released after ten years in prison. He immediately renews his relationship with his old girlfriend, Ingrid Everleigh. While Anderson was away in prison, Ingrid has been "kept" by a wealthy man named Werner, who put her up in an Upper East Side apartment block in Manhattan. Anderson determines rapidly to burgle the entire building in a single sweep – filling a furniture van with the proceeds. He gains financing from a Mafia boss, Pat Angelo, by redeeming a favor owed him, and gathers his four-man crew. The team is composed of an ancient ex-con drunk, "Pop" and a young drug dealer called "The Kid", both of whom had been released from prison the same day as Anderson. Also Edward Williams, a young black man who will serve as driver, and an older, effeminate art dealer called Tommy Hoskins, who will scope out the premises and determine what items to steal.

Unbeknownst to Anderson, he is under surveillance for almost the entire operation, from the earliest planning to the execution. This includes the Bureau of Narcotics and Dangerous Drugs, checking into whether or not The Kid had gone back to dealing drugs; the FBI, monitoring Williams because he lived upstairs from Black Panther Party offices, and Hoskins because of his suspected involvement in the interstate smuggling of antiques; the IRS, which is after the mob boss who is financing the operation; and a private detective hired by Werner to eavesdrop on his mistress Ingrid. None of these investigations involve Anderson directly, and the various surveilling federal, state, municipal, and private agencies all have different missions (and targets), so they do not cooperate with each other, and none anticipates the robbery.

Tommy Haskins goes through the apartment building, identifying valuables, and assessing potential loot. "The Kid" will take care of burglar alarms and telephones. The Mafia foists the thuggish Rocco "Socks" Parelli, a psychopath who has become a liability to them, onto the heist team. As part of the deal, Anderson must kill him in the course of the robbery. Anderson reluctantly agrees.

The operation proceeds over a Labor Day weekend. Disguised as a Mayflower moving crew, the team cuts telephone and alarm wires and moves up through the building, gathering the residents as they rob each apartment. "Pop" replaces the building's doorman, who has been left bound and gagged in the cellar. Jerry Bingham, the son of two of the residents, is a paraplegic and asthmatic who is left behind in his air-conditioned room. Using his ham radio equipment, he puts out an emergency call about a burglary in progress in his building. Amateur radio enthusiasts in other states pick up the alert and notify the New York City Police Department. As the oblivious criminals continue their work, the police respond in force and besiege the apartment, deploying the Emergency Service Unit to handle the situation.

As the police move in, Anderson shoots "Socks", and the police team opens fire, shooting and incapacitating Anderson. The other robbers leave him behind and attempt to flee in the moving truck, but the robbers are incapacitated and apprehended after the truck slams into a roadblock, while the backup getaway van crashes, killing the driver. "Pop" gives himself up while covering for the others by putting all the blame on "Socks". Having never adapted to life on the outside, he looks forward to going back to prison. In the course of searching the building, the police discover audio listening equipment left behind by the private detective hired to check up on Ingrid.

Anderson dies, and when the story of the crime breaks in the morning newspaper, the BNDD, FBI, IRS, and private detective order their tapes erased so that no subsequent investigations into their illegal wiretapping can lead back to them.

== Cast ==
- Sean Connery as John "Duke" Anderson
- Dyan Cannon as Ingrid Everleigh
- Martin Balsam as Tommy Haskins
- Ralph Meeker as Edward X. "Iron Balls" Delaney
- Alan King as Pat Angelo
- Dick Anthony Williams as Edward Spencer
- Val Avery as Rocco "Socks" Parelli
- Garrett Morris as Sgt. Everson
- Stan Gottlieb as William "Pop" Meyerhoff
- Christopher Walken as Kurt Spencer aka “The Kid”
- Conrad Bain as Dr. Rubicoff
- Margaret Hamilton as Miss Kaler
- Anthony Holland as Psychologist
- Scott Jacoby as Jerry Bingham
- Judith Lowry as Mrs. Hathaway
- Meg Myles as Mrs. Longene (as Meg Miles)
- Norman Rose as Longene
- Max Showalter as Bingham
- Janet Ward as Mrs. Bingham
- Paul Benjamin as Jimmy
- Helen Martin as Bank Teller
- Jack Doroshow as Eric
- Richard Shull as Werner Gottlieb

== Production ==
Two characters from the novel on which the film was based were merged for the film: "Ingrid Macht" and "Agnes Everleigh" became "Ingrid Everleigh".

Sean Connery, Martin Balsam, and director Sidney Lumet were to work together again in 1974 on Murder on the Orient Express. Connery had previously worked with the director in 1965 on The Hill, and they would reunite in 1973 on The Offence, and again many years later for Family Business in 1989. Balsam and Lumet had worked together previously in 1957 on 12 Angry Men.

This was the first major motion picture for Christopher Walken, as well as the last on-screen film appearance by Margaret Hamilton. Cliff Robertson claimed he turned down a role in the movie.

Sean Connery's performance as the likeable criminal Duke Anderson was instrumental in his breakout from being typecast as James Bond. It also restored him to the ranks of top male actors in the United States.

The Anderson Tapes was filmed on location in New York City on Fifth Avenue at the Convent of the Sacred Heart (the luxury apartment building), Rikers Island Prison, the Port Authority Bus Terminal, Luxor Health Club and on the Lower East Side. Interiors scenes were filmed at Hi Brown Studio and ABC-Pathé Studio, both in New York City. The production was on a tight budget, and filming was completed from mid-August to October 16, 1970. The film was the first for producer Robert M. Weitman as an independent producer.

Columbia Pictures was not happy with the concept for the ending of the film, in which Connery escaped to be pursued by police helicopters, fearing that it would hurt sales to television, which generally required that bad deeds do not go unpunished.

The Anderson Tapes made its American network television premiere on September 11, 1972, as an installment of NBC Monday Night at the Movies.

== Reception ==
=== Box office ===
The film generated $5 million in U.S. and Canada rentals.

=== Critical response ===
Roger Greenspun of The New York Times called the film "well done and entertaining". He noted Lumet's direction by writing "The quality of professionalism appears in rather lovely manifestations to raise a by no means perfect film to a level of intelligent efficiency that is not so very far beneath the reach of art".

Roger Ebert enjoyed the film, but called Lumet's emphasis on electronic surveillance a "serious structural flaw". Andrew Sarris of The Village Voice wrote that there was only "eleven good minutes in it", calling the rest of the film "confused and uncertain".

On the review aggregator website Rotten Tomatoes, 75% of 20 critics' reviews are positive, with an average rating of 6.3/10. Metacritic, which uses a weighted average, assigned the film a score of 61 out of 100, based on 12 critics, indicating "generally favorable" reviews.

== See also ==
- The Conversation, a 1974 film
- List of American films of 1971
- List of films featuring home invasions
- List of films featuring surveillance
