= Walton Musser =

Clarence Walton Musser (April 5, 1909, Mount Joy, Pennsylvania – June 8, 1998) inventor of strain wave gearing and also credited with over 250 major inventions and discoveries.

Some of his inventions were the Army recoilless rifle, aircraft personnel catapults, instrumentation for underwater detonation testing. His varied career includes experience in many diverse fields. He was research advisor to the Department of Defense for 15 years. With other industrial and government organizations, he has served as chief engineer, director of research, and consultant. He held professional engineering licences in Pennsylvania and Massachusetts. As a research adviser to United Shoe Machinery Corp., (Note: Despite their name, the United Shoe Machinery Corp. were important constructors of many novel pieces of military hardware in the 1950s.) he explored nonrigid-body mechanics, using controlled deflection as an operating medium. In 1957 Musser announced invention of strain wave gearing also known as harmonic gearing (U. S. patent 2,906,143). He is also the inventor of first fluidic stepper actuators
