= Archie (robot) =

Archie is a humanoid robot, developed in TU Wien (TUW) in Austria and University of Manitoba in Canada. The development of Archie started in 2004 at the Institute of Handling Robots and Devices (IHRT) under supervision of Professor Peter Kopacek. Archie is a teen sized Humanoid and is over 120 cm tall. Lower body of Archie is designed and driven using brushless motors that are able to provide 50 Nm moment after the gearbox output. For Archie's joints Harmonic drives are employed in order to decrease the size of the design and increasing the efficiency of the Robot. Each joint is controlled individually and can provide a high performance motion control. All the joints are connected to central control unit using a customized high speed network. Archie's central controller unit is called Spinal system which is designed to control the whole robot as well as maintaining the balance of the robot. For the balance in the robot, the "Spinal system" uses the feedback from the joints and the data from an inertial measurement unit (IMU). Electronic design and implementation of Archie is done by Ahmad Byagowi as his PhD thesis required project.

== Control System ==
The control system of Archie is based on a hierarchy structure with a central controller. The central controller which entitles an HydraXC50 (Xilinx Virtex 4 FPGA) is designed to run a Real Time Linux (RT-Linux) beside some application based hardware. For instance, the communication (back and forth) between the central controller and the joints of the robot is designated as a task for the application based hardware. As a rough explanation, the communication hardware used in the central controller acts like a graphic card. Detailed explanation can be found in related reference.
