= Cycloidal drive =

Eccentric gear reduction mechanism

Animation of a cycloidal drive

A cycloidal drive or cycloidal speed reducer is a mechanism for reducing the speed of an input shaft by a certain ratio. Cycloidal speed reducers are capable of relatively high ratios in compact sizes with very low backlash.

The input shaft drives an eccentric bearing that in turn drives the cycloidal disc in an eccentric, cycloidal motion. The perimeter of this disc is geared to a stationary ring gear and has a series of output shaft pins or rollers placed through the face of the disc. These output shaft pins directly drive the output shaft as the cycloidal disc rotates. The radial motion of the disc is not translated to the output shaft.

== Theory of operation ==
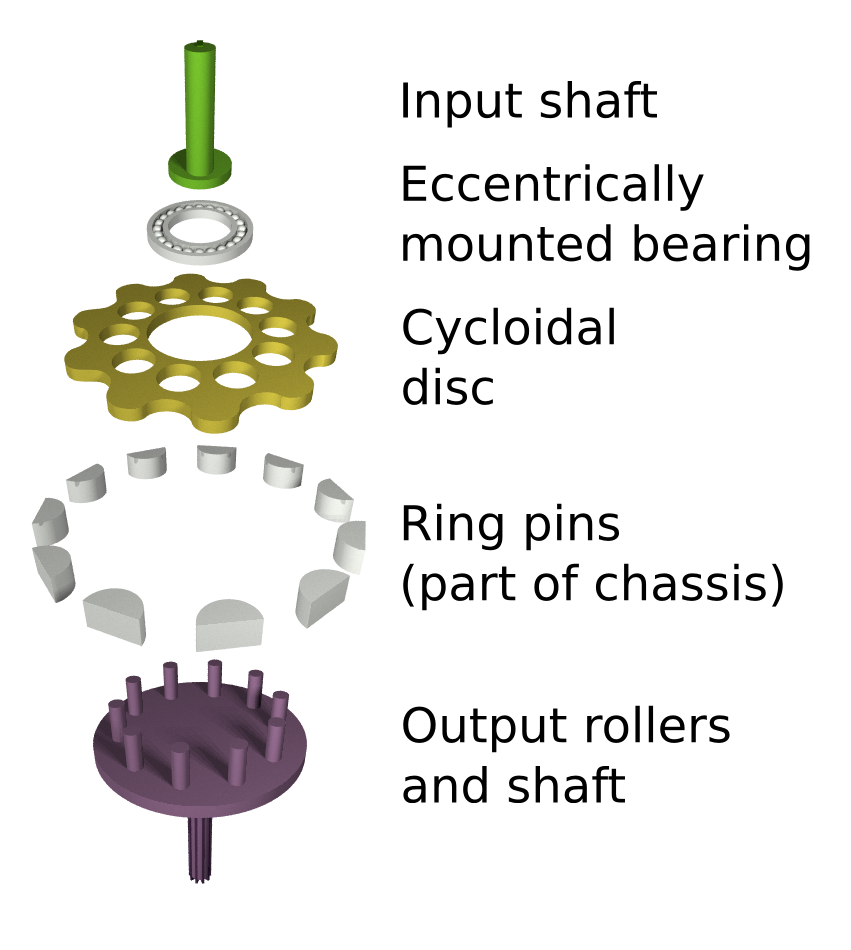
Parts of a 10:1 cycloidal speed reducer mechanism

The input shaft is mounted eccentrically to a rolling-element bearing (typically a cylindrical roller bearing), causing the cycloidal disc to wobble in a circle. The cycloidal disc will independently rotate around the bearing as it is pushed against the ring gear. This is similar to planetary gearing. The direction of rotation of the disc and output is opposite to that of the input shaft.

The number of pins on the ring gear is larger than the number of pins on the cycloidal disc. This causes the cycloidal disc to rotate around the bearing faster than the input shaft is moving it around, giving an overall rotation in the direction opposing the rotation of the input shaft.

The cycloidal disc has holes that are larger (by an amount equal to the eccentricity of the input shaft) than the output roller pins that go inside them. The output pins will move around in the holes to achieve steady rotation of the output shaft from the wobbling movement of the cycloidal disc.

The reduction rate of the cycloidal drive is obtained from the following formula, where P means the number of the ring gear pins and L is the number of lobes on the cycloidal disc.

$$r = \frac{P - L}{L}$$

Single-stage efficiency approaches 93% and double-stage approaches 86%. Single stage reductions are available commercially up to 119:1 and double stage up to 7,569:1.

The cycloid disc is usually designed with a shortened cycloid in order to minimize the eccentricity of the disc and the associated unbalance forces at high speeds. For this reason, two cycloid discs are often mounted offset by 180°.

Many modern precision drives provide the eccentric motion through multiple shafts that also transmit the output force, typically 2 to 5 shafts arranged in the same circular pattern as the output rollers of the most basic design. The shafts are driven through planetary-like gears by a central input shaft. Since these shafts are always aligned by the input gears this allows the output to be transmitted through roller bearings rather than intermittent surface contact. Due to the planetary input this is effectively a two-stage drive and may be designed to be directly driven by a high speed brushless motor. This type is often used in robot actuators.

== Disadvantages ==
Due to the eccentric nature of the drive, if the cycloidal disk is not balanced by a second disk or a counterweight, it will generate vibrations which propagate through the driven shafts and the body. This increases wear on the exterior teeth of the cycloidal disk and the component bearings. With two discs the static imbalance is corrected but a small dynamic imbalance remains. This is generally considered acceptable for most applications. To reduce vibration, high-speed drives use three or more discs to correct the imbalance; the outer discs move in unison, in opposition to the middle one, which is twice as massive.

== Advantages ==
Cycloidal drives can feature zero backlash and high torque capacity while being compact in size, unlike involute gearboxes. They are useful in situations where low speed with high torque is required. Cycloidal drives may be designed with significantly higher contact areas for their size than any gear-based transmission such as epicyclic gearing. They apply force through many of the teeth at once, allowing very high torque output relative to size at the cost of requiring sliding contact.

== History ==
Cycloid technology traces back to the German engineer and designer Lorenz Braren. In the 1920s, he developed an innovative gearbox that eventually became known as the Cyclo. He received a patent for this cycloid gearbox invention in 1925. Subsequently, in 1931, he founded his company, Cyclo GmbH, in Munich and began serial production of cycloid gearboxes in the 1930s. Thanks to a licensing agreement in 1937 with a Japanese company, now part of the Sumitomo Heavy Industries group, the first Cyclo drives were also produced under license in Japan starting in 1939.

== See also ==
- Epicyclic gearing
- Cycloid gear – A gear tooth shape based on the cycloid
- Harmonic drive
