= Archie (meteorite) =

Meteorite

- Type: Chondrite
- Class: Ordinary chondrite
- Group: H6
- Country: United States of America
- Region: Missouri
- Coordinates: 38°30′N 94°18′W
- Observed fall: Yes
- TKW: 5.07 kg

Archie is an H chondrite meteorite that fell to earth on August 10, 1932, in Archie, Missouri.

== Classification ==
It is an ordinary chondrite type H with a petrologic type 6, thus belongs to the group H6.

== See also ==
- Glossary of meteoritics
- Meteorite falls
- Ordinary chondrite
