= Archy McNally =

Fictional character

- Created by: Lawrence Sanders

In-universe information
- Occupation: Private investigator

Archibald "Archy" McNally is a fictional character created by bestselling novelist Lawrence Sanders. He is the protagonist of thirteen novels, seven by Sanders and six by Vincent Lardo, who took over the series following Sanders' death in 1998. Archy is the Son in the law firm McNally and Son, Attorney. Thirty-six years of age when the series begins, Archy lives in his parents' home (a "third floor suite: bedroom, sitting room, dressing room, bathroom") and is the head (and sole member) of the firm's Discreet Inquiries department. Archy is employed as a private investigator for the firm's clients, often working in tandem with Sergeant Al Rogoff. Expelled from Yale Law for a youthful indiscretation that involved streaking in a Richard Nixon mask, Archy McNally is a self-described "bon vivant, dillettantish detective, and the only man in Palm Beach to wear white tie and tails to dinner at a Pizza Hut."

Archy NcNally (not "Arch," which is more adjective than name) is no cynical, hard-boiled dick: he drives a red Mazda Miata ("one of the first in South Florida"), stays in shape by swimming two miles along the Atlantic shore in the late afternoons), dresses per local custom ("this is South Florida, where everyone favors pastels")), favors frozen daiquiris "from the June solstice to the September equinox,") and tries to limit his consumption of English Oval cigarettes) as he adds daily notes to his private journal).

== Archy McNally Novels ==
#	Title (Pub Date)	Summary
1	McNally's Secret (1992)	Archy investigates the disappearance of four rare Inverted Jenny stamps from the estate of McNally and Son client Lady Cynthia Horowitz. With a tip from Palm Beach Police Department Sergeant Al Rogoff, Archy speaks to a stamp dealer willing to inquire as to whether the potentially purloined stamps are for sale. But when that dealer is murdered, Archy is plunged into a mystery that will end with suicide, a broken heart, and learning a family secret that he would have liked not to have known about.
2	McNally's Luck (1992)	Pursuing two seemingly unrelated discrete inquiries—one regarding a catnapping ransom for a "fat Persian with vile disposition", the other a series of threatening letters sent to the rich wife of a poet whose first book is called "The Joy of Flatulence,"—Archy spots a link: both the ransom note and the letters were created by the same word processor. Then the poet's wife is murdered, the poet appears to commit suicide, and Archy puts his life on the line when he becomes the bagman to deliver the ransom for a cat nobody misses except its owner.
3	McNally's Risk (1993)	When the son of "an old and valued client of McNally & Son, Attorney-at-Law," becomes affianced to a woman suspected of being a goldigger, Archy assumes the job of conducting a "discreet but thorough investigation" that unravels when a portrait painter is murdered with palette knife, a spurned love of the son is shot, and Archy falls for the woman he is investigating.
4	McNally's Caper (1994)	After solving a case of recreational shoplifting by a wealthy client of McNally & Son, Archy receives an assignment to solve a string of thefts from the household of Griswold Forsythe II, "The all-time champion bore of Palm Beach." Stationed at the Forsythe estate under the pretense of cataloging the patriach's books, it does not take long for Archy to realize that almost nobody at Chez Forsythe is whom they seem to be. And then there is an attempted murder, followed by a successful murder. Archy and Palm Beach Police Department Sergeant Al Rogoff are hard pressed to solve this caper.
5	McNally's Trial (1995)	Although he has been referred to in other books in the series, the recurring character Binky Watrous makes his first appearance in this story as Archy contemplates his next assignment: investigating why McNally & Son client Whitcomb Funeral Homes is making too much money. Binky, who has a great capacity for partying, becomes the inside man in a mystery that involves fake death certificates and a bogus shipping company.
6	McNally's Puzzle (1996)	The morning after completing the recovery of a rare 1910 Sweet Caporal Honus Wagner baseball card from the divorced wife of a McNally & Son client, Archy receives a new assignment: investigating a death-threat made against Hiram Gottschalk, proprietor of Parrots Unlimited. With the assistance of Binky Watrous, who goes undercover as an employee of Parrots Unltd., Archy insinuates himself into the Gottschalk family and business to learn if the threats are real or simply the imaginings of an old man. Reality assets itself when Hiram Gottschalk is murdered, and Archy finds himself working once again with Sgt. Al Rogoff.
7	McNally's Gamble (1997)	Following a birthday dinner for the elder McNally, Archy receives a new assignment: looking into the bonafides of an investment advisor to McNally & Son client Edith Westmore who has suggested Edith buy "a Fabergé egg from a man in Paris." With the continued unpaid assistance of Binky Watrous, Archy unravels a mystery that includes fraud, blackmail, and murder.
8	McNally's Dilemma (1999)	In this first Archy McNally story written by Vincent Lardo, Archy looks after the daughter of long-time friend Melva Williams after Melva confesses to shooting and killing her husband.
9	McNally's Folly (2000)	Wealthy Richard and DeeDee Holmes come to Palm Beach for the season, and Archy, who knows DeeDee is none other than Desdemona Darling, "one of the most celebrated actresses at a time some like to call Hollywood's Golden Age," is awestruck. Mr. Holmes engages the Discrete Inquiries services of McNally & Son to locate the blackmailer who torments his actress wife with annual reminders of a "risque one-reeler" she once made. Along the way, Archy matches wits with a psychic who has become the "current rage of Palm Beach society", becomes the director for a local production of Arsenic and Old Lace, and is present when murder is committed during a cast party. The weapon? Arsenic.
10	McNally's Chance (2001)	With the "lord and lady of the manor" away on a Caribbean cruise, Archy meets author Sabrina Wright at Bar Anticipation. Wright, famous for her "bodice-rippers par excellence," wants to hire Archy to find her husband and her daughter, both of whom have disappeared—the daughter first, and then the husband sent to find her. The daughter, Gillian is in Palm Beach to locate the anynomous man who is her real father; the husband is there to convince her to not do so. That Sabrina Wright herself is also in PB, as revealed by a Lolly Spindrift column that claims the celebrity author is "looking for the man that got away dot, dot, dot.". When the real fathers (plural!) of Gillian Wright reach out to Archy, it becomes clear that Sabrina has been playing a dangerous game that soon turns deadly.
11	McNally's Alibi (2002)	Archy is again propositioned by a client rather than being assigned a discrete inquiry by his father. The client is Claudia Lester, who wants to recover a stolen diary from a former lover who wants to publish it, revealing secrets best kept. Reticent to be a bagman, Archy, distracted by his estrangement from long-time-love Consuela Garcia, does the job, only to be blindsided, knocked unconscious, and waking with neither the money nor the diary. When a dead body is found in the motel room where the exchange had been made, Archy McNally is a person of interest in the eyes of Florida State Trooper Georgia O'Hara, and Lt. O'hara becomes a person of interest for Archy.
12	McNally's Dare (2003)	When murder happens at the Palm Beach Tennis Everyone! fundraiser, Archy McNally is one of the first on the scene. He is hired to find the killed by three different clients with three different theories of who the murderer might be.
13	McNally's Bluff (2004)	In the final book of the series, Archy McNally solves an impossible murder committed in the Amazin' Maze of Matthew Hays in front of numerous witnesses
	McNally's Files (2006)	An anthology of the first three Archy McNally novels

== Setting ==
The primary setting of the McNally series is Palm Beach, Florida. Recurring locations within that setting include the following:

- The McNally 'manse' "on A1A, right across the road from the Atlantic Ocean," is a "three-story faux Tudor with mullioned windows and a leaky copper mansard roof" that projects "moneyed ease--costly comfort without flash.".
- The offices of McNally and Son,"a five-story edifice of glass and stainless steel" where the firm's staff do work in "estate planning, taxes, revocable and charitable trusts," plus "litigation; real estate; copyrights; trademarks and patents; divorce; malpractice; personal and product liability; and even one old codger who knew more about maritime law than anyone south of Chesapeake Bay." Archy rarely occupies his office therein, which is "possibly the smallest in the building," assigned to him so that his father "could easily refute any charges of nepotism.
- The Pelican Club, an establishment created by Archy and his "wassailing pals" from a "two-story clapboard house out near the airport." The club faced Chapter 7 bankruptcy shortly after opening but was saved by hiring the Pettibone family to run it.
- The estates of McNally and Son clients, such as Lady Cynthia Horowitz, who is featured in the first book.
- Bar Anticipation, "the most infamous bar in South Florida."

== Characters ==
Recurring characters in the series include the following:

- Prescott McNally, the Attorney of McNally and Son, father of Archibald. Prescott's sire was Fredrick ("Ready Freddy") McNally, a burlesque comic and "remarkably astute investor in real estate" who purchased properties in Florida in the 1920s and sent Prescott to Yale to "become a gentleman and eventually an attorney-at-law." A man of steadfast routine, Prescott McNally observes a daily cocktail hour (of thirty minutes duration) and reads Charles Dickens while sipping a glass of port in his study after dinner.
- Madelaine McNally, mother of Archibald, "a paid-up member of the Union of Ditsy Mommies," she is also "an absolutely glorious woman, warm and loving." Nearing seventy years of age, Madelaine drives "an old, wood-bodied Ford Station wagon," and talks to her begonias.
- Consuela Garcia, the on-again, off-again romantic partner of Archy McNally and "social secretary and general factotum"to McNally and Son client Lady Cynthia Horowitz.
- Jamie Olson, McNally houseman and savant of Palm Springs service staff gossip.
- Ursi Olson, McNally housewoman and chef.
- Simon Pettibone, Pelican Club manager and bartender.
- Jasmine (Jas) Pettibone, Pelican club wife, housekeeper and den mother, wife of Simon, mother of Jasmine and Leroy.
- Leroy Pettibone, Pelican Club chef.
- Priscilla Pettibone, Pelican Club waitress.
- Sergeant Al Rogoff, Palm Beach Police Department, who drives a pickup truck and affects a "good-ol' boy' persona while secretly being a man who reads Martin Heidegger, T.S. Elliot, and enjoys fine wines.
- Mrs. Trelawney, personal secretary to Prescott McNally.
- Lolly Spindrift, the Palm Beach gossip columnist who "fills his Mont Blanc with acid and his bed with men."
- Binky Watrous, a work-averse buddy of Archy's who was expelled from Princeton for punching a British VIP.
- Georgia O'Hara, Florida State Trooper, with whom Archy becomes infatuated in McNally's Alibi, and with whom he is now dating openly in McNally's Dare.
