= Vincent Lardo =

American novelist (1931–2025)

- Born: February 17, 1931; New York City, U.S.
- Died: December 24, 2025 (aged 94)
- Education: City College of New York; Fairleigh Dickinson University
- Occupation: Novelist
- Partner: Bob Evans (deceased)
- Writing career
- Genre: Crime fiction

Vincent A. Lardo (February 17, 1931 – December 24, 2025) was an American popular crime novelist.

== Life and career ==
Born in the Bronx on February 17, 1931, Lardo attended the former Evander Childs High School, followed by the City College of New York.

Lardo enlisted in the Army in 1952, and in 1953 was due to be sent to fight in the Korean War. The armistice was signed the same day he was scheduled to sail. In 1954 he was stationed in Japan, and was discharged the same year. He enrolled at Fairleigh Dickinson University in New Jersey under the G.I. Bill, gaining a degree in English literature. After pursuing a banking career, he entered public relations and advertising which became his main career until the mid-1980s when he started writing novels after learning to use a word processor.

In 1998, he retired and relocated from Manhattan to his second home in Amagansett with his partner, Bob Evans, who died a year later.

He said that his first novel, a "mainstream" mystery, was rejected by publishers, until he decided to change the plot, removing the protagonist's wife, and giving him a gay son.

Following the death of popular novelist Lawrence Sanders in 1998, Lardo was offered the opportunity to continue Sanders' Archy McNally series. Eventually six of Lardo's McNally novels reached The New York Times Best Seller list. The authorial transition was not without incident. Following publication of the first novel, class-action suits against the publisher were brought by McNally fans who contended that they had been deceived as to the new authorship: in the hardcover version Lardo's name had been printed in small type on the copyright page. Settlements by the publisher were made.

In 2013, Lardo returned to the gay-lesbian genre with The Jockstrap Murders.

Lardo died on December 24, 2025, at the age of 94.

== Selected works ==
=== Novels ===
- China House (1983)
- The Prince and the Pretender (1984)
- Mask of Narcissus (1987)
- The Hampton Affair (1999)
- Death by Drowning (2000)
- The Hampton Connection (2000)
- The Jockstrap Murders (2013)

=== Archy McNally novels ===
- McNally's Dilemma (1999)
- McNally's Folly (2000)
- McNally's Chance (2001)
- McNally's Alibi (2002)
- McNally's Dare (2003)
- McNally's Bluff (2004)

=== Articles ===
- Wilde's Company: Nineteen Cleveland St., London. 1889 in The Gay & Lesbian Review Worldwide, 1996
