= Lawrence Sanders =

American writer (1920–1998)

- Born: March 15, 1920; Brooklyn, New York, United States
- Died: February 7, 1998 (aged 77); Pompano Beach, Florida, U.S.
- Occupation: Writer
- Writing career
- Genres: Fiction, mystery, crime
- Notable work: The Anderson Tapes

Lawrence Sanders (March 15, 1920 – February 7, 1998) was an American novelist and short story writer.

== Life ==
Lawrence Sanders was born in Brooklyn in New York City. After public school he attended Wabash College, where he obtained a Bachelor of Arts degree. He then returned to New York and worked at Macy's Department Store. In 1943 he joined the United States Marine Corps and was discharged in 1946. Sanders was a former magazine editorial writer and later turned to full-time fiction writing. He wrote his first novel, The Anderson Tapes, in 1970 at the age of 50 and in 1971 received the Edgar Award from the Mystery Writers of America for best first novel. It deals with a plot by a group of criminals to rob a luxury apartment building. His Archy McNally series was continued by author Vincent Lardo.

== Lawrence Sanders bibliography ==
Edward X. Delaney series:

- The Anderson Tapes (1970)
- The First Deadly Sin (1973)
- The Second Deadly Sin (1977)
- The Third Deadly Sin (1981)
- The Fourth Deadly Sin (1985)

Peter Tangent series:

- The Tangent Objective (1976)
- The Tangent Factor (1976)

The Commandment series:

- The Sixth Commandment (1978)
- The Tenth Commandment (1980)
- The Eighth Commandment (1986)
- The Seventh Commandment (1991)

Timothy Cone series:

- The Timothy Files (1987) [collection]
- Timothy's Game (1988) [collection]

Archy McNally series:

- McNally's Secret (1991)
- McNally's Luck (1992)
- McNally's Risk (1993)
- McNally's Caper (1994)
- McNally's Trial (1995)
- McNally's Puzzle (1996)
- McNally's Gamble (1997)

Written with or by Vincent Lardo:

- McNally's Dilemma (1999)
- McNally's Folly (2000)
- McNally's Chance (2001)
- McNally's Alibi (2002)
- McNally's Dare (2003)
- McNally's Bluff (2004)
- McNally's Files (2006) - 3 for 1 collection (Secret, Luck, Risk)

Miscellaneous titles

- The Pleasures of Helen (1971)
- Love Songs (1972)
- The Tomorrow File (1975)
- The Marlow Chronicles (1977)
- Caper (1980) [under pseudonym Lesley Andress]
- Dark Summer (1980) [under pseudonym Mark Upton]
- The Case of Lucy Bending (1982)
- The Seduction of Peter S (1983)
- The Passion of Molly T (1984)
- The Loves of Harry Dancer (1985)
- Tales of the Wolf (1986) [collection of 13 stories published in Swank, 1968-9]
- The Dream Lover (1986)
- Capital Crimes (1989)
- Stolen Blessings (1990)
- Sullivan's Sting (1990)
- Private Pleasures (1993)
- Guilty Pleasures (1998)
