= Strain wave gearing =

Mechanical transmission system with flexing

Outer circle: circular spline (fixed); Middle circle: flex spline (attached to output shaft, not shown); Inner oval: wave generator (attached to input shaft; inner ball bearing and shaft not shown)

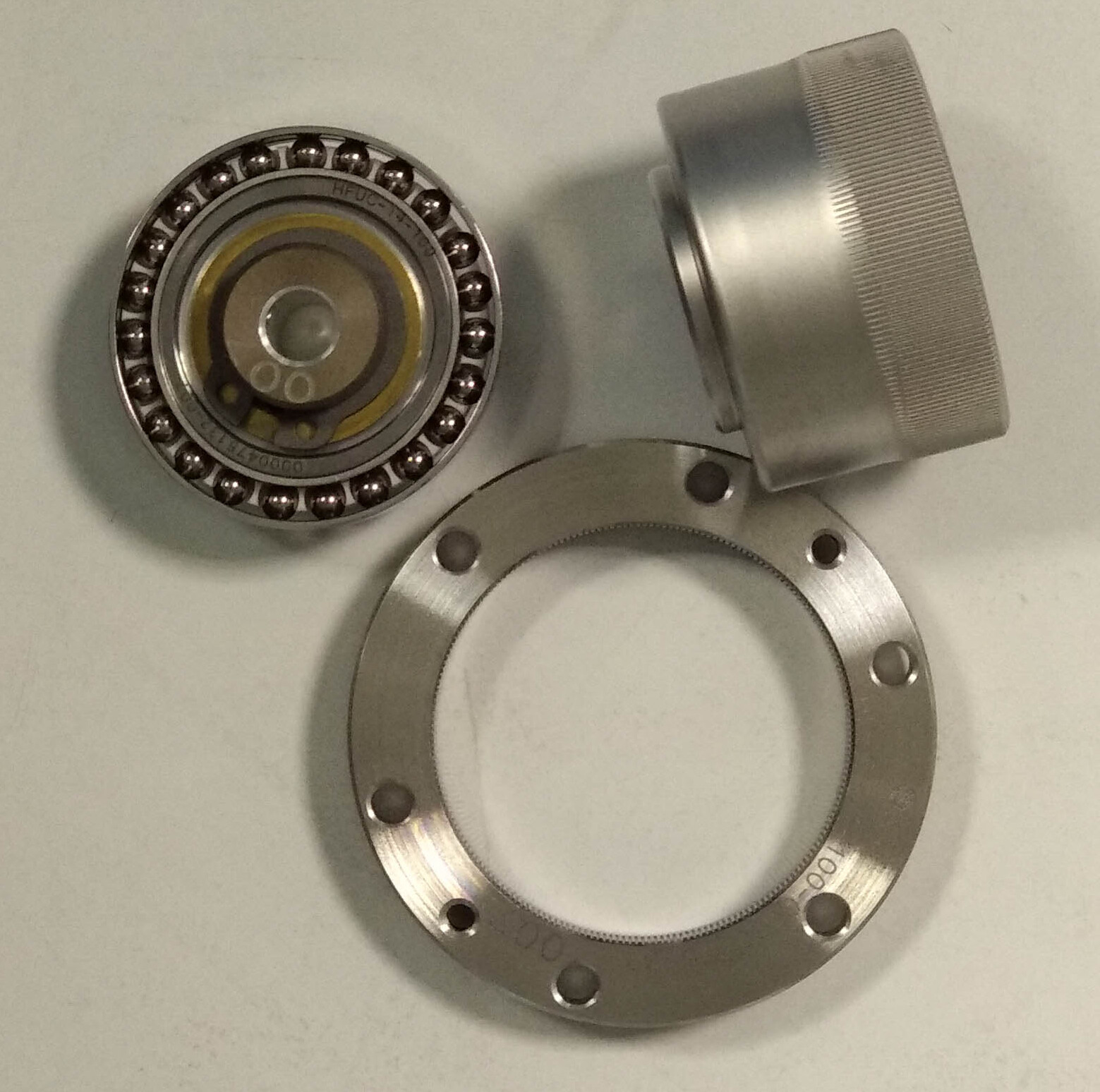
Harmonic Drive SE strain wave gear set consisting of wave generator bearing (top left), flexspline cup (top right) and circular spline ring (bottom).

Strain wave gearing (also known as harmonic gearing) is a type of mechanical gear system that uses a flexible spline with external teeth that is deformed by a rotating elliptical plug to engage with the internal gear teeth of an outer spline.

The German company Harmonic Drive SE manufactured the first series-produced gears under the product name or registered trademark Harmonic Drive.

Strain wave gearing has some advantages over traditional gearing systems, such as helical or planetary gears, including:

- no backlash,
- compactness and light weight,
- high gear ratios,
- reconfigurable ratios within a standard housing,
- good resolution and excellent repeatability (linear representation) when repositioning inertial loads,
- high torque capability,
- coaxial input and output shafts.

High gear reduction ratios are possible in a small volume (a ratio from 30:1 up to 320:1 is possible in the same space in which planetary gears typically only produce a 10:1 ratio).

Disadvantages include a tendency for 'wind-up' (a torsional spring rate) in the low torque region.

Strain wave gearing is commonly used in robotics and aerospace. It can provide gear reduction but may also be used to increase rotational speed, or for differential gearing.

== History ==
The basic concept of strain wave gearing (SWG) was introduced by C.W. Musser in a 1957 patent while he was an advisor at United Shoe Machinery Corp (USM). It was first used successfully in 1960 by USM Co. and later by Hasegawa Gear Works under license of USM. Later, Hasegawa Gear Work became Harmonic Drive Systems located in Japan and USM Co. Harmonic Drive division became Harmonic Drive Technologies. In 1971, on NASA's Apollo 15 mission, the Lunar Roving Vehicle (LRV) was driven by one electric motor per wheel - connected by 80:1 Harmonic Drive gears.

== Mechanics ==
Cross section of a harmonic gear.: 1. input shaft; 2. wave generator; 3. flexspline; 4. circular spline; 5. output shaft; 6. housing

The strain wave gearing uses the elasticity of metal. The mechanism has three basic components: a wave generator (2 / green), a flex spline (3 / red), and a circular spline (4 / blue). More complex versions have a fourth component normally used to shorten the overall length or to increase the gear reduction within a smaller diameter, but still follow the same basic principles.

The wave generator is made of two separate parts: an elliptical disk called a wave generator plug and an outer ball bearing. The elliptical plug is inserted into the bearing, forcing the bearing to conform to the elliptical shape but still allowing rotation of the plug within the outer bearing.

The flex spline is shaped like a shallow cup. The sides of the spline are very thin, but the bottom is relatively rigid. This results in significant flexibility of the walls at the open end due to the thin wall, and in the closed side being rigid enough to be tightly secured (to a shaft, for example). Teeth are positioned radially around the outside of the flex spline. The flex spline fits tightly over the wave generator, so that when the wave generator plug is rotated, the flex spline deforms to the shape of a rotating ellipse and does not slip over the outer elliptical ring of the ball bearing. The ball bearing lets the flex spline rotate independently to the wave generator's shaft.

The circular spline is a rigid circular ring with teeth on its inside. The flex spline and wave generator are placed inside the circular spline, meshing the teeth of the flex spline and the circular spline. Because the flex spline is deformed into an elliptical shape, its teeth only actually mesh with the teeth of the circular spline in two regions on opposite sides of the flex spline (located on the major axis of the ellipse).

Assume that the wave generator is the input rotation. As the wave generator plug rotates, the flex spline teeth which are meshed with those of the circular spline slowly change position. The major axis of the flex spline's ellipse rotates with wave generator, so the points where the teeth mesh revolve around the center point at the same rate as the wave generator's shaft. The key to the design of the strain wave gear is that there are fewer teeth (often for example two fewer) on the flex spline than there are on the circular spline. This means that for every full rotation of the wave generator, the flex spline would be required to rotate a slight amount (two teeth in this example) backward relative to the circular spline. Thus the rotation action of the wave generator results in a much slower rotation of the flex spline in the opposite direction.

For a strain wave gearing mechanism, the gearing reduction ratio can be calculated from the number of teeth on each gear, in a similar manner to a cycloidal drive:

$$R = \frac {\text{flex spline teeth} - \text{circular spline teeth}} {\text{flex spline teeth}}, \quad  -1 < R < 0$$

Note that the reciprocal of the reduction ratio is sometimes referred to with the same phrase and symbol.

For example, if there are 202 teeth on the circular spline and 200 on the flex spline, the reduction ratio is (200 − 202)/200 = −0.01

Thus the flex spline spins at 1/100 the speed of the wave generator plug and in the opposite direction. Different reduction ratios are set by changing the number of teeth. This can either be achieved by changing the mechanism's diameter or by changing the size of the individual teeth and thereby preserving its size and weight. The range of possible gear ratios is limited by tooth size limits for a given configuration.

This reduction ratio is applicable to the configuration where the circular spline is fixed, the wave generator the input and the flexible spline the output. In case the circular spline also rotates, the following relation holds between the rotational velocities of the three parts:

$$\omega_{FS} = R \omega_{WG} + (1 - R) \omega_{CS}$$

Mind that $R$ is negative and small.

== Examples of use ==
The electrically driven wheels of the Apollo Lunar Rover included strain wave gears. Also, the winches used on Skylab to deploy the solar panels were powered using strain wave gears.

== See also ==
- Nidec-Shimpo America Corporation
- Cycloidal drive
- Peristaltic pump
