= Variator =

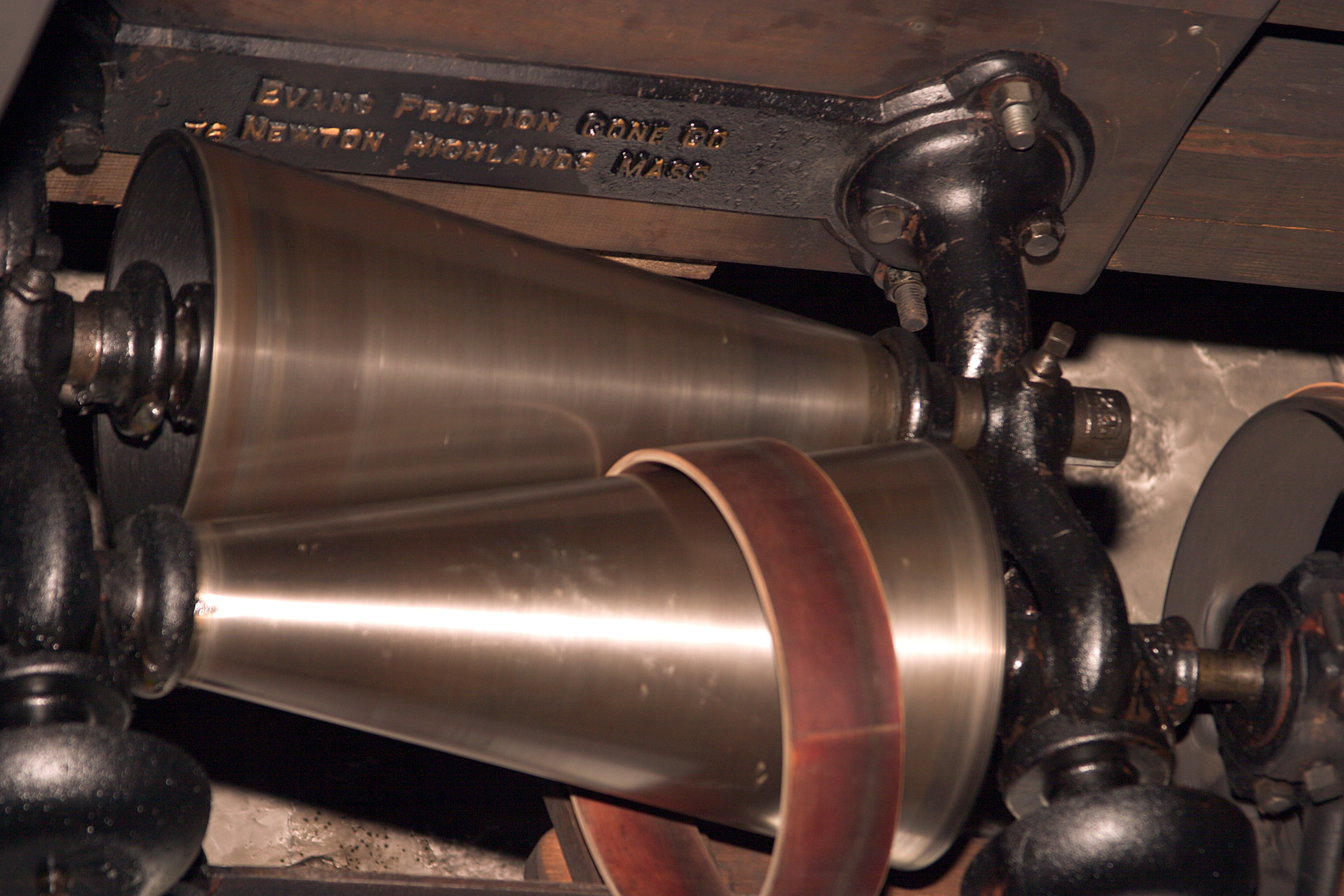

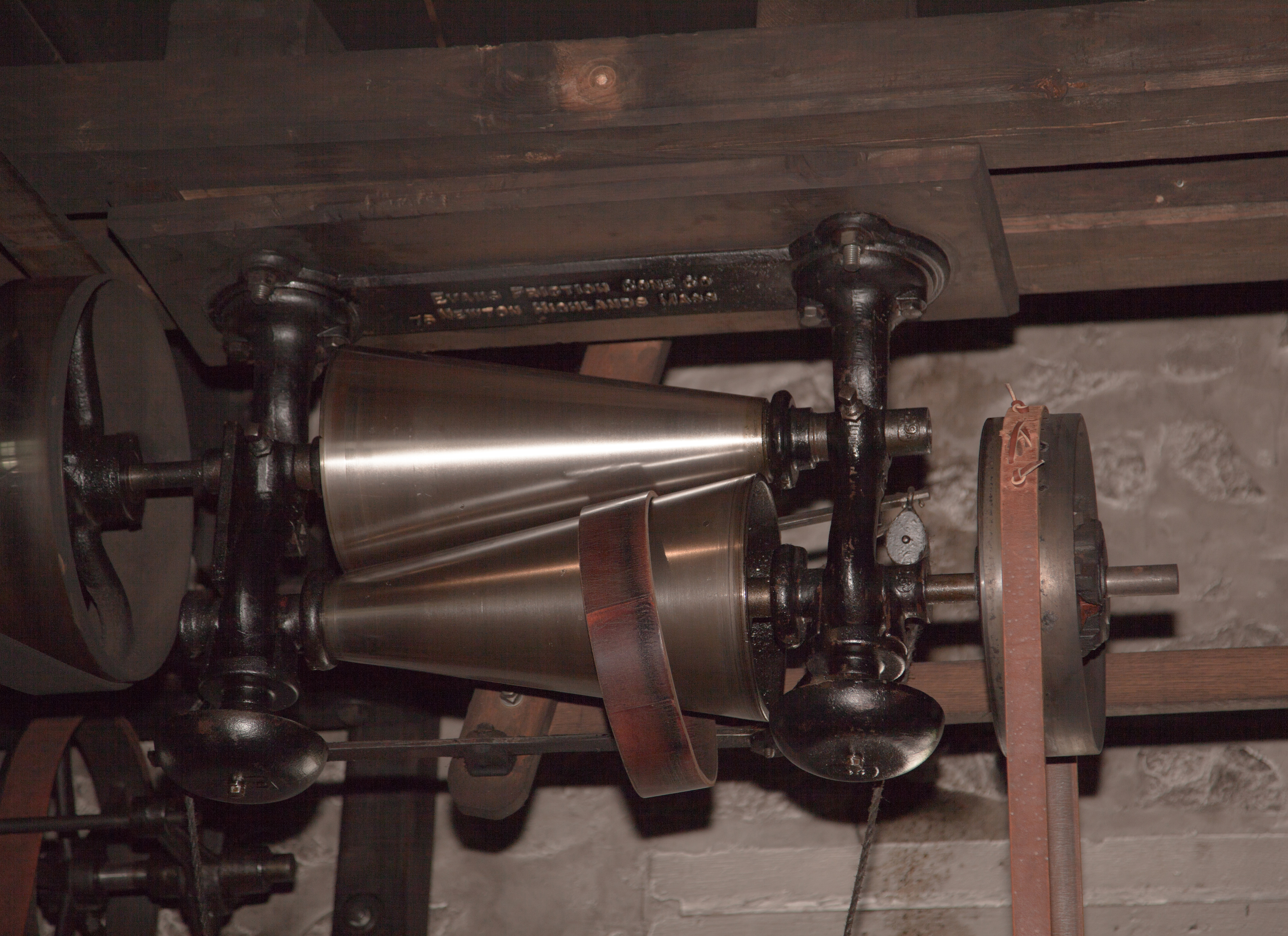
The Evans friction cone, a type of cone ring transmission. Moving the friction ring between the two cones varies the effective gear ratio

A variator is a device that can change its parameters, or can change parameters of other devices.

Often a variator is a mechanical power transmission device that can change its gear ratio continuously (rather than in steps).

== Examples ==
- Beier variable-ratio gear
- Continuously variable transmission
- Evans friction cone
- NuVinci continuously variable transmission
- Variator (variable valve timing)
- Variomatic
- VANOS

== See also ==
- Epicyclic gearing
