= Bicycle gearing =

Bicycle drivetrain aspect which relates cadence to wheel speed

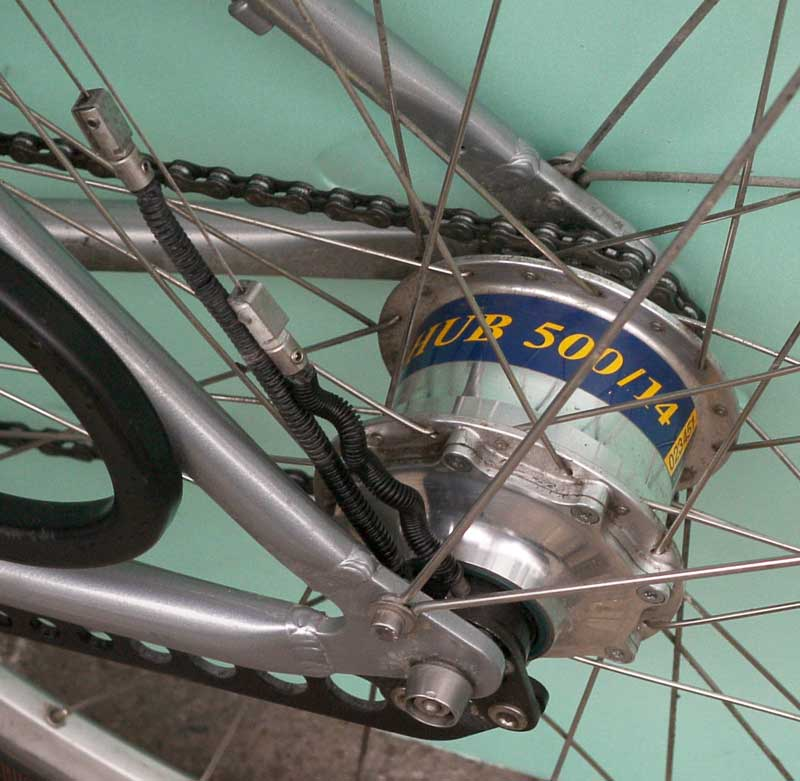
A Rohloff Speedhub model hub gear

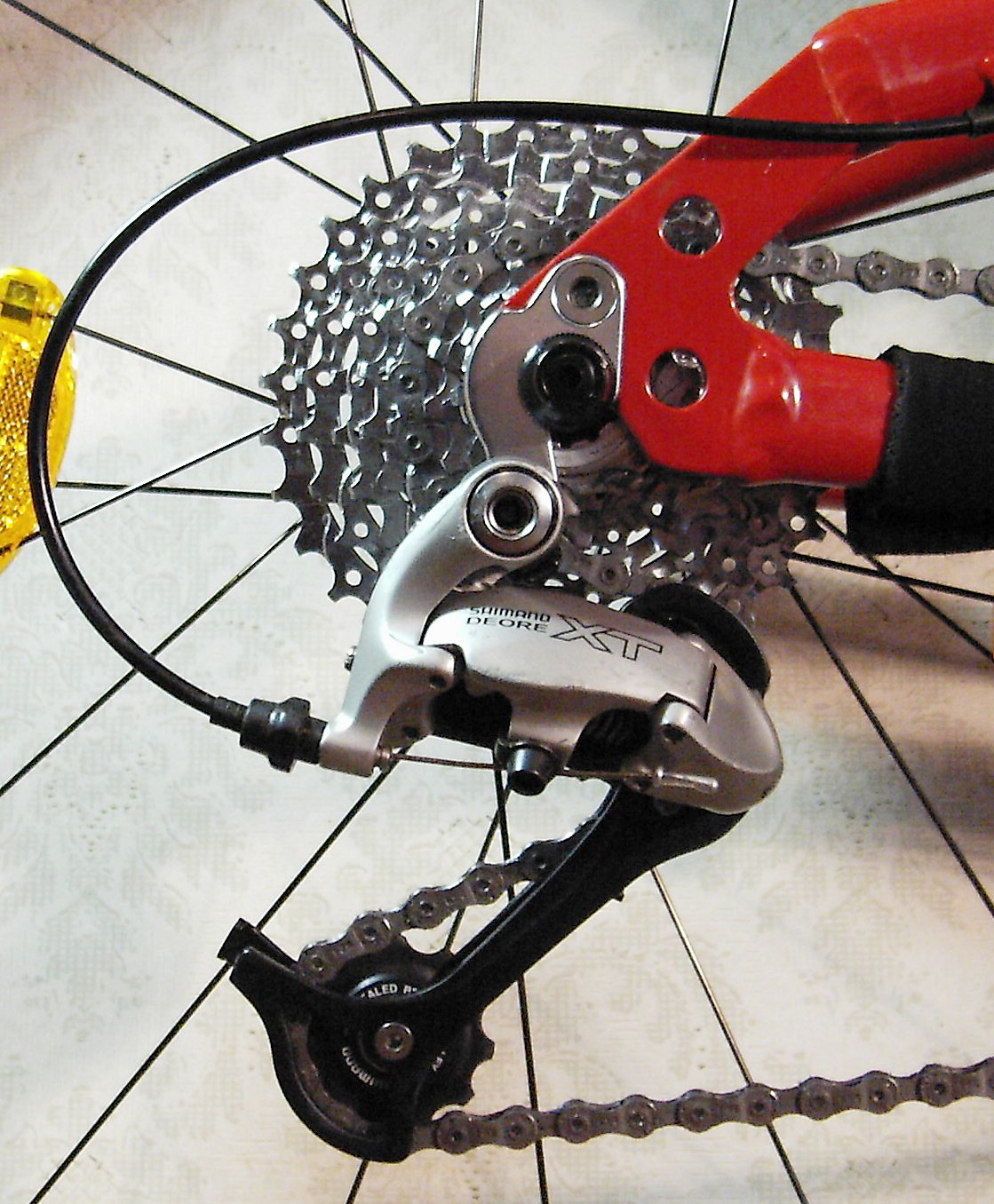
A Shimano XT rear derailleur on a mountain bike

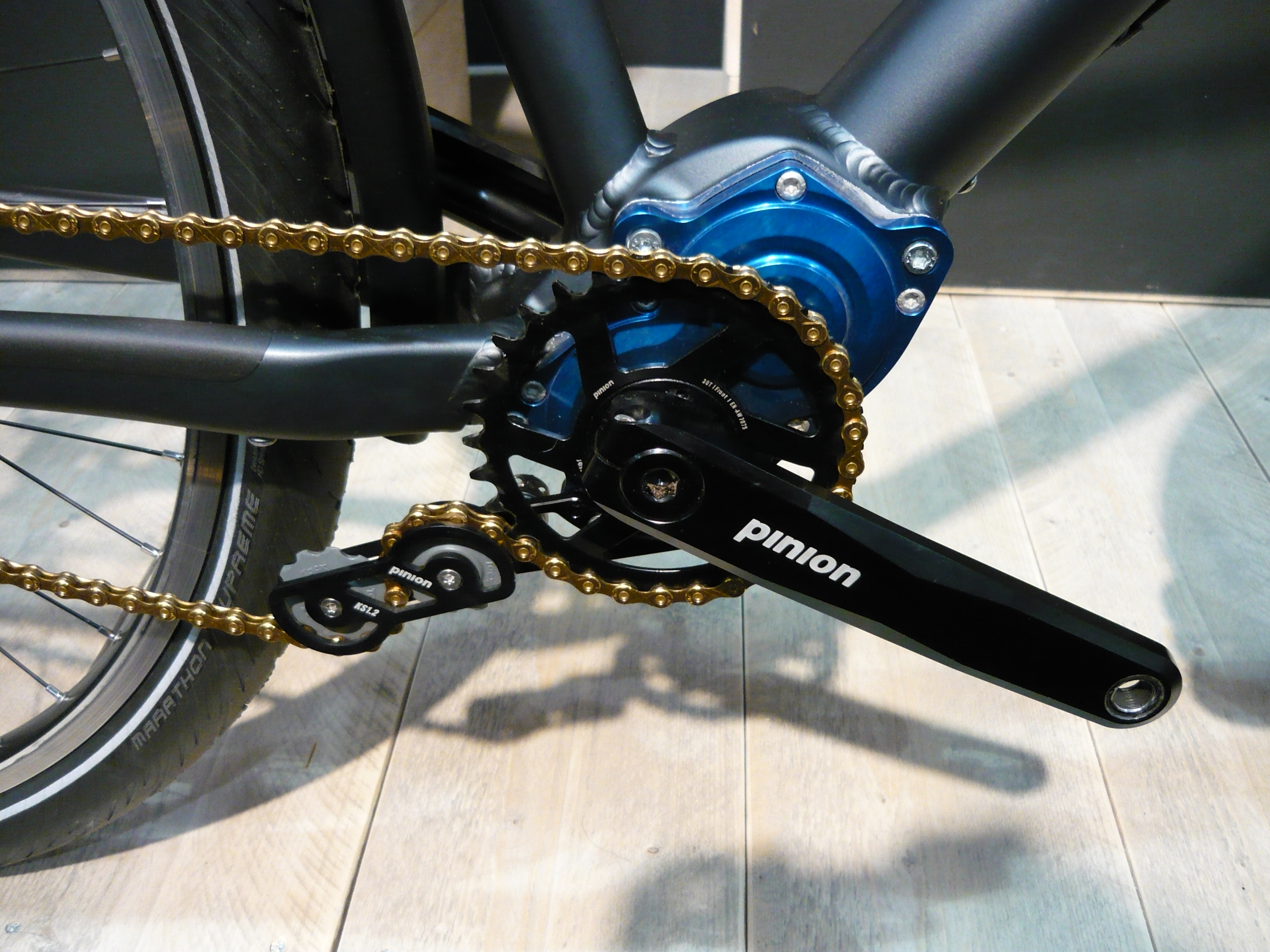
A bicycle gearbox with chain tensioner

Bicycle gearing is the aspect of a bicycle drivetrain that determines the relation between the cadence, the rate at which the rider pedals, and the rate at which the drive wheel turns.

On some bicycles there is only one gear and, therefore, the gear ratio is fixed, but most modern bicycles have multiple gears and thus multiple gear ratios. A shifting mechanism allows selection of the appropriate gear ratio for efficiency or comfort under the prevailing circumstances: for example, it may be comfortable to use a high gear when cycling downhill, a medium gear when cycling on a flat road, and a low gear when cycling uphill. Different gear ratios and gear ranges are appropriate for different people and styles of cycling.

A cyclist's legs produce power optimally within a narrow pedalling speed range, or cadence. Gearing can be optimized to use this narrow range as efficiently as possible. As in other types of transmissions, the gear ratio is closely related to the mechanical advantage of the drivetrain of the bicycle. On single-speed bicycles and multi-speed bicycles using derailleur gears, the gear ratio depends on the ratio of the number of teeth on the crankset to the number of teeth on the rear sprocket (cogset). For bicycles equipped with hub gears, the gear ratio also depends on the internal planetary gears within the hub. For a shaft-driven bicycle the gear ratio depends on the bevel gears used at each end of the shaft.

For a bicycle to travel at the same speed, using a lower gear (larger mechanical advantage) requires the rider to pedal at a faster cadence, but with less force. Conversely, a higher gear (smaller mechanical advantage) provides a higher speed for a given cadence, but requires the rider to exert greater force or stand while pedalling. Different cyclists may have different preferences for cadence, riding position, and pedalling force. Prolonged exertion of too much force in too high a gear at too low a cadence can increase the chance of knee damage; cadence above 100 rpm becomes less effective after short bursts, as during a sprint.

== Measuring gear ratios ==
=== Methods ===
There are at least four different methods for measuring gear ratios: gear inches, metres of development (roll-out), gain ratio, and quoting the number of teeth on the front and rear sprockets respectively. The first three methods result in each possible gear ratio being represented by a single number which allows the gearing of any bicycles to be compared regardless of drive wheel diameter; the numbers produced by different methods are not comparable, but for each method the larger the number the higher the gear. The third method, gain ratio, also takes the length of the crankarm into account, which can vary from bike to bike. The fourth method uses two numbers and is only useful in comparing bicycles with the same drive wheel diameter. In the case of road bikes, this is usually around 670 mm. A 700c "standard" wheel has a 622 mm rim diameter. The final wheel diameter depends on the specific tire but will be approximately 622 mm plus twice the tire width.

Front/rear measurement only considers the sizes of a chainring and a rear sprocket. Gear inches and metres of development also take the size of the rear wheel into account. Gain ratio goes further and also takes the length of a pedal crankarm into account.

Gear inches and metres of development are closely related: to convert from gear inches to metres of development, multiply by 0.08 (more precisely: 0.0798, or exactly: 0.0254 · π).

The methods of calculation which follow assume that any hub gear is in direct drive. Multiplication by a further factor is needed to allow for any other selected hub gear ratio (many online gear calculators have these factors built in for various popular hub gears).

- Gear inches = Diameter of drive wheel in inches × (number of teeth in front chainring / number of teeth in rear sprocket). Normally rounded to nearest whole number.
- Metres of development = Circumference of drive wheel in metres × (number of teeth in front chainring / number of teeth in rear sprocket).
- Gain ratio = (Radius of drive wheel/length of pedal crank) × (number of teeth in front chainring / number of teeth in rear sprocket). Measure radius and length in same units.

Both metres of development and gain ratios are normally rounded to one decimal place.

Gear inches corresponds to the diameter (in inches) of the main wheel of an old-fashioned penny-farthing bicycle with equivalent gearing. Metres of development corresponds to the distance (in metres) traveled by the bicycle for one rotation of the pedals. Gain ratio is the ratio between the distance travelled by the bicycle and the distance travelled by a pedal, and is a pure number, independent of any units of measurement.

- Front/rear gear measurement uses two numbers (e.g. 53/19) where the first is the number of teeth in the front chainring and the second is the number of teeth in the rear sprocket. Without doing some arithmetic, it is not immediately obvious that 53/19 and 39/14 represent effectively the same gear ratio.

=== Examples ===
The following table provides some comparison of the various methods of measuring gears (the particular numbers are for bicycles with 170 mm cranks, 700C wheels, and 25 mm tyres). Speeds for several cadences in revolutions per minute are also given. On each row the relative values for gear inches, metres of development, gain ratio, and speed are more or less correct, while the front/rear values are the nearest approximation which can be made using typical chainring and cogset sizes. Note that bicycles intended for racing may have a lowest gear of around 45 gear inches (3.6 meters), or 35 gear inches (2.8 meters) if fitted with a compact crankset).

Gear	Gear inches	Metre development	Gain ratio	Front/ rear	60 rpm		80 rpm		100 rpm		120 rpm	
Gear	Gear inches	Metre development	Gain ratio	Front/ rear	mph	km/h	mph	km/h	mph	km/h	mph	km/h
Very high	125	10.0	9.4	53/11	22.3	36	29.7	47.8	37.1	59.7	44.5	72
High	100	8.0	7.5	53/14	18	29	24	38.6	30	48.3	36	57.9
Medium	70	5.6	5.2	53/19 or 39/14	12.5	20	16.6	26.7	21	33.6	25	40
Low	40	3.2	3.0	34/23	7.2	11.6	9.6	15.4	11.9	19.2	14.3	23
Very low	20	1.6	1.5	32/42	3.5	5.6	4.7	7.6	5.9	9.5	7.1	11.4

== Single speed bicycles ==
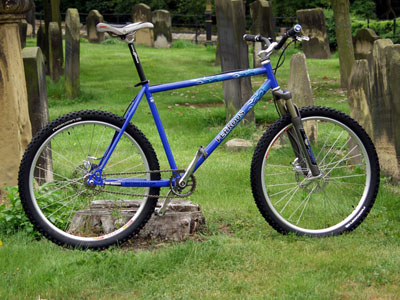
Single-speed mountain bike

A single-speed bicycle is a type of bicycle with a single gear ratio and a freewheel mechanism. These bicycles are without derailleur gears, hub gearing or other methods for varying the gear ratio of the bicycle. Adult single-speed bicycles typically have a gear ratio of between 55 and 75 gear inches, depending on the rider and the anticipated usage.

There are many types of modern single speed bicycles; BMX bicycles, some bicycles designed for (younger) children, cruiser type bicycles, classic commuter bicycles, unicycles, and bicycles designed for track racing.

Fixed-gear road bicycles and fixed-gear mountain bicycles are also usually single speed in that they typically do not have any gear ratio adjustment. However, fixed gear bicycles do not have a freewheel mechanism to allow coasting.

== General considerations ==
The gearing supplied by the manufacturer on a new bicycle is selected to be useful to the majority of people. Some cyclists choose to fine-tune the gearing to better suit their strength, level of fitness, and expected use. When buying from specialist cycle shops, it may be less expensive to get the gears altered before delivery rather than at some later date. Modern crankset chainrings can be swapped out, as can cogsets.

While long steep hills and/or heavy loads may indicate a need for lower gearing, this can result in a very low speed. Balancing a bicycle becomes more difficult at lower speeds. For example, a bottom gear around 16 gear inches gives an effective speed of perhaps 3 miles/hour (5 km/hour) or less, at which point it might be quicker to walk (bike shoes permitting).

=== Relative gearing ===
As far as a cyclist's legs are concerned, when changing gears, the relative difference between two gears is more important than the absolute difference between gears. This relative change, from a lower gear to a higher gear, is normally expressed as a percentage, and is independent of what system is used to measure the gears. Cycling tends to feel more comfortable if nearly all gear changes have more or less the same percentage difference. For example, a change from a 13-tooth sprocket to a 15-tooth sprocket (15.4%) feels very similar to a change from a 20-tooth sprocket to a 23-tooth sprocket (15%), even though the latter has a larger absolute difference.

To achieve such consistent relative differences the absolute gear ratios should be in logarithmic progression; most off-the-shelf cogsets do this with small absolute differences between the smaller sprockets and increasingly larger absolute differences as the sprockets get larger. Because sprockets must have a (relatively small) whole number of teeth it is impossible to achieve a perfect progression; for example the seven derailleur sprockets 14-16-18-21-24-28-32 have an average step size of around 15% but with actual steps varying between 12.5% and 16.7%. The epicyclic gears used within hub gears have more scope for varying the number of teeth than do derailleur sprockets, so it may be possible to get much closer to the ideal of consistent relative differences, e.g. the Rohloff Speedhub offers 14 speeds with an average relative difference of 13.6% and individual variations of around 0.1%.

Racing cyclists often have gears with a small relative difference of around 7% to 10%; this allows fine adjustment of gear ratios to suit the conditions and maintain a consistent pedalling speed. Mountain bikes and hybrid bikes often have gears with a moderate relative difference of around 15%; this allows for a much larger gear range while having an acceptable step between gears. 3-speed hub gears may have a relative difference of some 33% to 37%; such big steps require a very substantial change in pedalling speed and often feel excessive. A step of 7% corresponds to a 1-tooth change from a 14-tooth sprocket to a 15-tooth sprocket, while a step of 15% corresponds to a 2-tooth change from a 13-tooth sprocket to a 15-tooth sprocket.

By contrast, car engines deliver power over a much larger range of speeds than cyclists' legs do, so relative differences of 30% or more are common for car gearboxes.

=== Usable gears ===
On a bicycle with only one gear change mechanism (e.g. rear hub only or rear derailleur only), the number of possible gear ratios is the same as the number of usable gear ratios, which is also the same as the number of distinct gear ratios.

On a bicycle with more than one gear change mechanism (e.g. front and rear derailleur), these three numbers can be quite different, depending on the relative gearing steps of the various mechanisms. The number of gears for such a derailleur equipped bike is often stated simplistically, particularly in advertising, and this may be misleading.

Consider a derailleur-equipped bicycle with 3 chainrings and an 8-sprocket cogset:

the number of possible gear ratios is 24 (=3×8, this is the number usually quoted in advertisements);
the number of usable gear ratios is 22;
the number of distinct gear ratios is typically 16 to 18.

The combination of 3 chainrings and an 8-sprocket cogset does not result in 24 usable gear ratios. Instead it provides 3 overlapping ranges of 7, 8, and 7 gear ratios. The outer ranges only have 7 ratios rather than 8 because the extreme combinations (largest chainring to largest rear sprocket, smallest chainring to smallest rear sprocket) result in a very diagonal chain alignment which is inefficient and causes excessive chain wear. Due to the overlap, there will usually be some duplicates or near-duplicates, so that there might only be 16 or 18 distinct gear ratios. It may not be feasible to use these distinct ratios in strict low-high sequence anyway due to the complicated shifting patterns involved (e.g. simultaneous double or triple shift on the rear derailleur and a single shift on the front derailleur). In the worst case there could be only 10 distinct gear ratios, if the percentage step between chainrings is the same as the percentage step between sprockets. However, if the most popular ratio is duplicated then it may be feasible to extend the life of the gear set by using different versions of this popular ratio.

=== Gearing range ===
The gearing range indicates the difference between bottom gear and top gear, and provides some measure of the range of conditions (high speed versus steep hills) with which the gears can cope; the strength, experience, and fitness level of the cyclist are also significant. A range of 300% or 3:1 means that for the same pedalling speed a cyclist could travel 3 times as fast in top gear as in bottom gear (assuming sufficient strength, etc.). Conversely, for the same pedalling effort, a cyclist could climb a much steeper hill in bottom gear than in top gear.

The overlapping ranges with derailleur gears mean that 24 or 27 speed derailleur gears may only have the same total gear range as a (much more expensive) Rohloff 14-speed hub gear. Internal hub geared bikes typically have a more restricted gear range than comparable derailleur-equipped bikes, and have fewer ratios within that range.

The approximate gear ranges which follow are merely indicative of typical gearing setups, and will vary somewhat from bicycle to bicycle.

range	transmission	usable gears	mean step
180%	3-speed hub gears	3	34.2%
250%	5-speed hub gears	5	25.7%
300%	7-speed hub gears	7	20.1%
307%	8-speed hub gears	8	17.4%
327%	typical 1 chainring derailleur setup (1×10, 11-36)	10	14.1%
327%	road 1 chainring derailleur setup (1×11, 11-36)	11	12.6%
380%	NuVinci continuously variable transmission	continuous	none
409%	11-speed hub gears	11	15.1%
420%	mountain 1 chainring derailleur setup (1×11, 10-42)	11	15.4%
428%	road 2 chainring derailleur setup (2×10, 50-34 × 11-32)	13	12.9%
441%	road 3 chainring derailleur setup (3×10, 52/39/30 × 11-28)	15	11.2%
500%	extreme 1 chainring derailleur setup (1×12, 10-50)	12	15.8%
518%	mountain 2 chainring derailleur setup (2×10, 38-24 × 11-36)	14	13.5%
526%	Rohloff Speedhub 14-speed hub gear	14	13.6%
630%	Mountain 2×11 derailleur setup (24/36 × 10-42)	14	15.2%
636%	18-speed bottom bracket gearbox	18	11.5%
655%	mountain 3 chainring derailleur setup (3×10, 44-33-22 × 11-36)	16	13.3%
698%	touring 3 chainring derailleur setup (3×10, 48-34-20 × 11-32)	15	14.9%

Gear ranges of almost 700% can be achieved on derailleur setups, though this may result in some rather large steps between gears or some awkward gear changes. However, through the careful choice of chainrings and rear cogsets, e.g. 3 chainrings 48-34-20 and a 10-speed cassette 11–32, one can achieve an extremely wide range of gears that are still well spaced. This sort of setup has proven useful on a multitude of bicycles such as cargo bikes, touring bikes and tandems. Even higher gear ranges can be achieved by using a 2-speed bottom bracket hub gear in conjunction with suitable derailleurs.

== Types of gear change mechanisms ==
There are two main types of gear change mechanisms, known as derailleurs and hub gears. Both systems have advantages and disadvantages, and which is preferable depends on the particular circumstances. There are a few other relatively uncommon types of gear change mechanism which are briefly mentioned near the end of this section. Derailleur mechanisms can only be used with chain drive transmissions, so bicycles with belt drive or shaft drive transmissions must either be single speed or use hub gears.

=== External (derailleur) ===
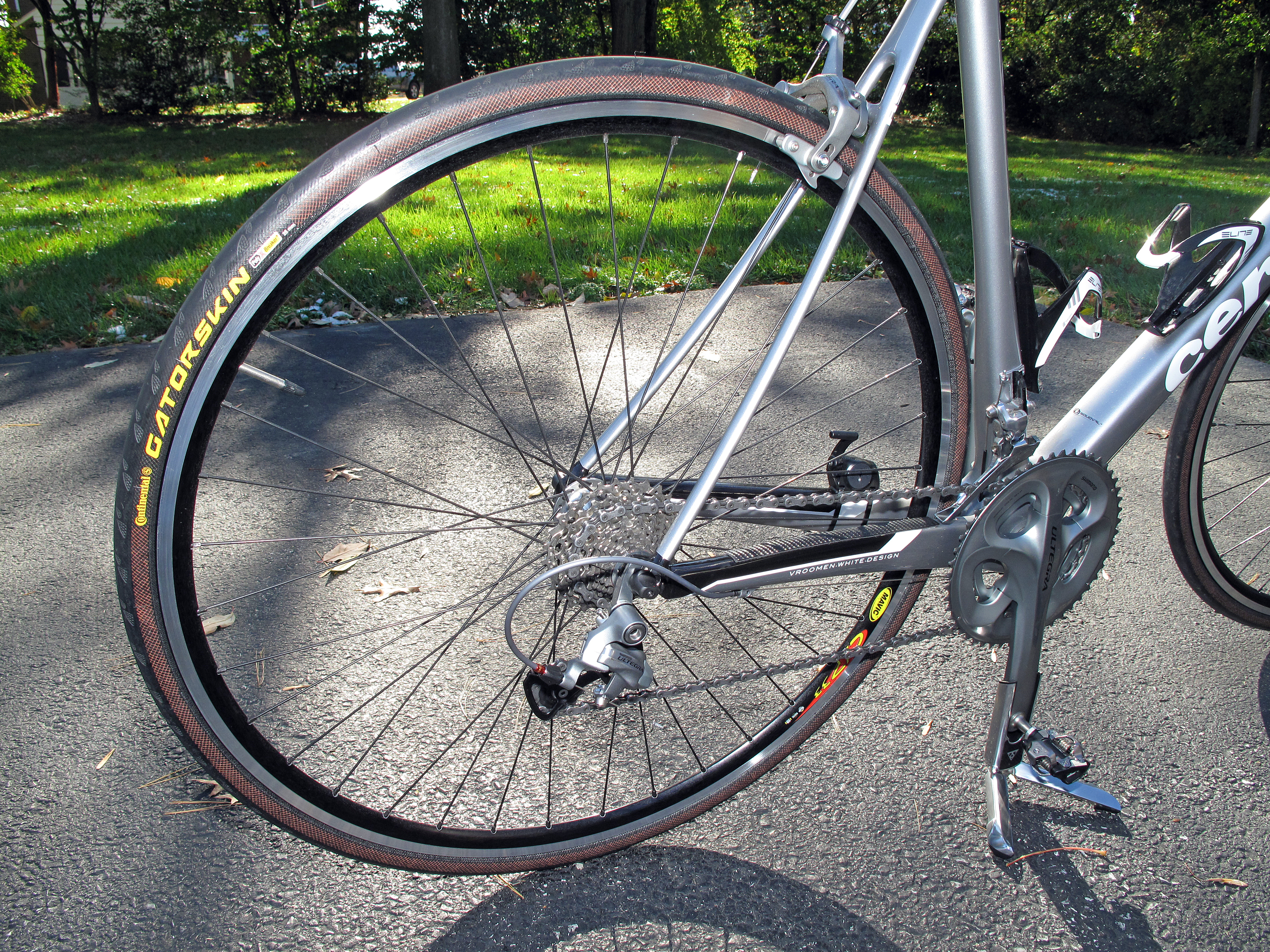
Bicycle rear wheel showing front and rear derailleurs, and rear cogset

External gearing is so called because all the sprockets involved are readily visible. There may be up to 4 chainrings attached to the crankset and pedals, and typically between 5 and 12 sprockets making up the cogset attached to the rear wheel. Modern front and rear derailleurs typically consist of a moveable chain-guide that is operated remotely by a Bowden cable attached to a shifter mounted on the down tube, handlebar stem, or handlebar. A shifter may be a single lever, or a pair of levers, or a twist grip; some shifters may be incorporated with brake levers into a single unit. When a rider operates the shifter while pedalling, the change in cable tension moves the chain-guide from side to side, "derailing" the chain onto different sprockets. The rear derailleur also has spring-mounted jockey wheels which take up any slack in the chain.

Most hybrid, touring, mountain, and racing bicycles are equipped with both front and rear derailleurs. There are a few gear ratios which have a straight chain path, but most of the gear ratios will have the chain running at an angle. The use of two derailleurs generally results in some duplicate or near duplicate gear ratios, so that the number of distinct gear ratios is typically around two-thirds of the number of advertised gear ratios. The more common configurations have specific names which are usually related to the relative step sizes between the front chainrings and the rear cogset.

==== Crossover gearing ====
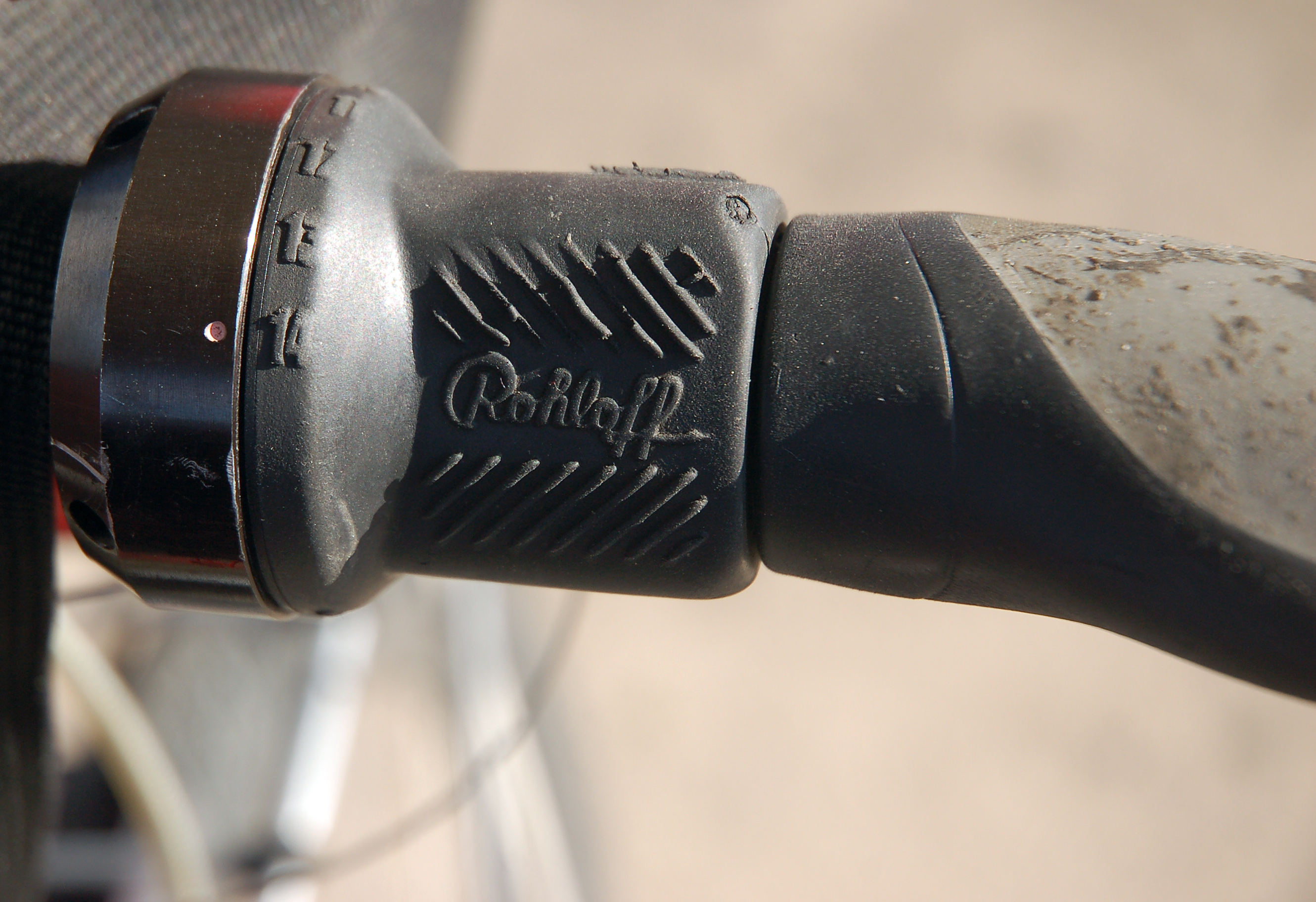
Twist grip

This style is commonly found on mountain, hybrid, and touring bicycles with three chainrings. The relative step on the chainrings (say 25% to 35%) is typically around twice the relative step on the cogset (say 15%), e.g. chainrings 28-38-48 and cogset 12-14-16-18-21-24-28.

Advantages of this arrangement include:

- A wide range of gears may be available suitable for touring and for off-road riding.
- There is seldom any need to change both front and rear derailleurs simultaneously so it is generally more suitable for casual or inexperienced cyclists.

One disadvantage is that the overlapping gear ranges result in a lot of duplication or near-duplication of gear ratios.

==== Multi-range gearing ====
This style is commonly found on racing bicycles with two chainrings. The relative step on the chainrings (say 35%) is typically around three or four times the relative step on the cogset (say 8% or 10%), e.g. chainrings 39-53 and close-range cogsets 12-13-14-15-16-17-19-21 or 12-13-15-17-19-21-23-25. This arrangement provides much more scope for adjusting the gear ratio to maintain a constant pedalling speed, but any change of chainring must be accompanied by a simultaneous change of 3 or 4 sprockets on the cogset if the goal is to switch to the next higher or lower gear ratio.

==== Alpine gearing ====
This term has no generally accepted meaning. Originally it referred to a gearing arrangement which had one especially low gear (for climbing Alpine passes); this low gear often had a larger than average jump to the next lowest gear. In the 1960s the term was used by salespeople to refer to then current 10-speed bicycles (2 chainrings, 5-sprocket cogset), without any regard to its original meaning. The nearest current equivalent to the original meaning can be found in the Shimano Megarange cogsets, where most of the sprockets have roughly a 15% relative difference, except for the largest sprocket which has roughly a 30% difference; this provides a much lower gear than normal at the cost of a large gearing jump.

==== Half-step gearing ====
There are two chainrings whose relative difference (say 10%) is about half the relative step on the cogset (say 20%). This was used in the mid-20th century when front derailleurs could only handle a small step between chainrings and when rear cogsets only had a small number of sprockets, e.g. chainrings 44-48 and cogset 14-17-20-24-28. The effect is to provide two interlaced gear ranges without any duplication. However to step sequentially through the gear ratios requires a simultaneous front and rear shift on every other gear change.

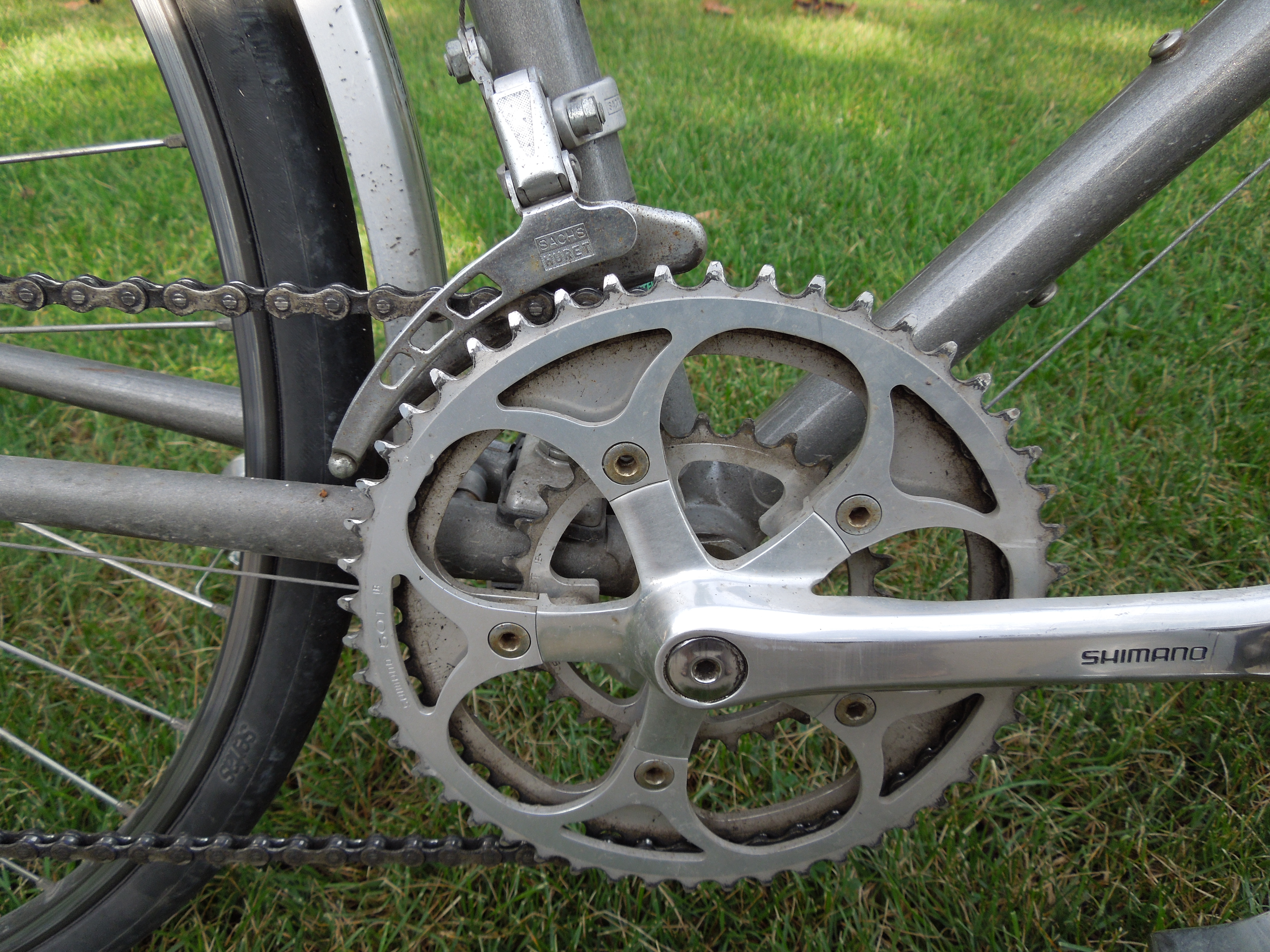
Half-step plus granny crankset with 28, 45, and 50 tooth chainrings on a Trek 620 touring bicycle

==== Half-step plus granny gearing ====
There are three chainrings with half-step differences between the larger two and multi-range differences between the smaller two, e.g. chainrings 24-42-46 and cogset 12-14-16-18-21-24-28-32-36. This general arrangement is suitable for touring with most gear changes being made using the rear derailleur and occasional fine tuning using the two large chainrings. The small chainring (granny gear) is a bailout for handling steeper hills, but it requires some anticipation in order to use it effectively.

=== Internal (hub) ===
Internal gearing is so called because all the gears involved are hidden within a wheel hub. Hub gears work using internal planetary, or epicyclic, gearing which alters the speed of the hub casing and wheel relative to the speed of the drive sprocket. They have just a single chainring and a single rear sprocket, almost always with a straight chain path between the two. Hub gears are available with between 2 and 14 speeds; weight and price tend to increase with the number of gears. All the advertised speeds are available as distinct gear ratios controlled by a single shifter (except for some early 5-speed models which used two shifters). Hub gearing is often used for bicycles intended for city-riding and commuting.

=== Internal (bottom bracket) ===
Current systems have gears incorporated in the crankset or bottom bracket. Patents for such systems appeared as early as 1890. The Schlumpf Mountain Drive and Speed Drive have been available since 2001. Some systems offer direct drive plus one of three variants (reduction 1:2.5, increase 1.65:1, and increase 2.5:1). Changing gears is accomplished by using your foot to tap a button protruding on each side of the bottom bracket spindle. The effect is that of having a bicycle with twin chainrings with a massive difference in sizes. Pinion GmbH introduced in 2010 an 18 speed gearbox model, offering an evenly spaced 636% range. This gearbox is actuated by traditional twist shifter and uses two cables for gear changing. The Pinion system is well suited for mountain bicycles due to its wide range and low gravity center suitable for full-suspension bikes, but it is still somewhat heavier than derailleur-based drivetrain.

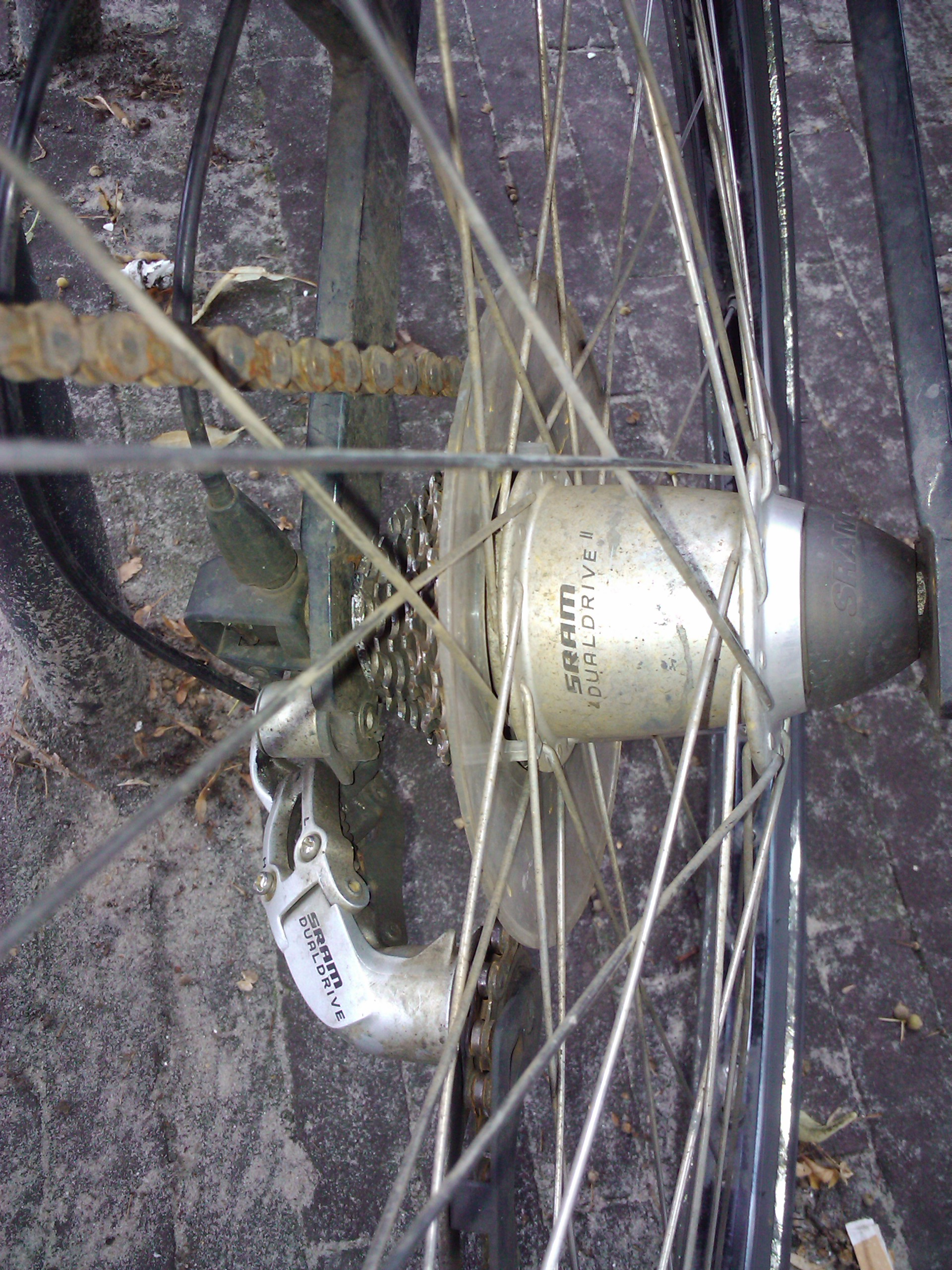
SRAM Dual Drive combination derailleur gears and hub gear

=== Internal and external combined ===
It is sometimes possible to combine a hub gear with derailleur gears. There are several commercially available possibilities:

- One standard option for the Brompton folding bicycle is to use a 3-speed hub gear (roughly a 30% difference between gear ratios) in combination with a 2-speed derailleur gear (roughly a 15% difference) to give 6 distinct gear ratios; this is an example of half-step gearing. Some Brompton suppliers offer a 2-speed chainring 'Mountain Drive' as well, which results in 12 distinct gear ratios with a range exceeding 5:1; in this case, the change from 6th to 7th gear involves changing all three sets of gears simultaneously.
- The SRAM DualDrive system uses a standard 8 or 9-speed cogset mounted on a three-speed internally geared hub, offering a similar gear range to a bicycle with a cogset and triple chainrings.
- Less common is the use of a double or triple chainring in conjunction with an internally geared hub, extending the gear range without having to fit multiple sprockets to the hub. However, this does require a chain tensioner of some sort, negating some of the advantages of hub gears.
- At an extreme opposite from a single speed bicycle, hub gears can be combined with both front and rear derailleurs, giving a very wide-ranging drivetrain at the expense of weight and complexity of operation- there are a total of three sets of gears. This approach may be suitable for recumbent trikes, where very low gears can be used without balance issues, and the aerodynamic position allows higher gears than normal.

=== Others ===
There have been, and still are, some quite different methods of selecting a different gear ratio:

- Retro-direct drivetrains used on some early 20th century bicycles have been resurrected by bicycle hobbyists. These have two possible gear ratios but no gear lever; the operator simply pedals forward for one gear and backward for the other. The chain path is quite complicated, since it effectively has to do a figure of eight as well as follow the normal chain path.
- Flip-flop hubs have a double-sided rear wheel with a (different sized) sprocket on each side. To change gear: stop, remove the rear wheel, flip it over, replace the wheel, adjust chain tension, resume cycling. Current double sided wheels typically have a fixed sprocket on one side and a freewheel sprocket on the other.

Prior to 1937 this was the only permitted form of gear changing on the Tour de France. Competitors could have 2 sprockets on each side of the rear wheel, but still had to stop to manually move the chain from one sprocket to the other and adjust the position of the rear wheel so as to maintain the correct chain tension.

- Continuously variable transmissions are a relatively new development in bicycles (though not a new idea). Mechanisms like the NuVinci gearing system use balls connected to two disks by static friction - changing the point of contact changes the gear ratio.
- Automatic transmissions have been demonstrated and marketed for both derailleur and hub gear mechanisms, often accompanied by a warning to disengage auto-shifting if standing on the pedals. These have met with limited market success.
- Moving the connection point on a lever changes the mechanical advantage of a drive system in a way analogous to changing gear ratios. Examples include the American Star Bicycle and the Stringbike.

== Efficiency ==
The numbers in this section apply to the efficiency of the drive-train, including means of transmission and any gearing system. In this context efficiency is concerned with how much power is delivered to the wheel compared with how much power is put into the pedals. For a well-maintained transmission system, efficiency is generally between 86% and 99%, as detailed below.

Factors besides gearing which affect performance include rolling resistance and air resistance:

- Rolling resistance can vary by a factor of 10 or more depending on type and dimensions of tire and the tire pressure.
- Air resistance increases greatly as speed increases and is the most significant factor at speeds above 10 to 12 miles (15 to 20 km) per hour (the drag force increases in proportion to the square of the speed, thus the power required to overcome it increases in proportion to the cube of the speed).

Human factors can also be significant. Rohloff argues that overall efficiency can be improved in some cases by using a slightly less efficient gear ratio when this leads to greater human efficiency (in converting food to pedal power) because a more effective pedalling speed is being used.

=== Overview ===
An encyclopedic overview can be found in Chapter 9 of "Bicycling Science" which covers both theory and experimental results. Some details extracted from these and other experiments are provided in the next subsection, with references to the original reports.

Factors which have been shown to affect the drive-train efficiency include the type of transmission system (chain, shaft, belt), the type of gearing system (fixed, derailleur, hub, infinitely variable), the size of the sprockets used, the magnitude of the input power, the pedalling speed, and how rusty the chain is. For a particular gearing system, different gear ratios generally have different efficiencies.

Some experiments have used an electric motor to drive the shaft to which the pedals are attached, while others have used averages of a number of actual cyclists. It is not clear how the steady power delivered by a motor compares with the cyclic power provided by pedals. Rohloff argues that the constant motor power should match the peak pedal power rather than the average (which is half the peak).

There is little independent information available relating to the efficiency of belt drives and infinitely variable gear systems; even the manufacturers/suppliers appear reluctant to provide any numbers.

=== Details ===
Derailleur type mechanisms of a typical mid-range product (of the sort used by serious amateurs) achieve between 88% and 99% mechanical efficiency at 100 W. In derailleur mechanisms the highest efficiency is achieved by the larger sprockets. Efficiency generally decreases with smaller sprocket and chainring sizes. Derailleur efficiency is also compromised with cross-chaining, or running large-ring to large-sprocket or small-ring to small-sprocket. This cross-chaining also results in increased wear because of the lateral deflection of the chain.

Chester Kyle and Frank Berto reported in "Human Power" 52 (Summer 2001) that testing on three derailleur systems (from 4 to 27 gears) and eight gear hub transmissions (from 3 to 14 gears), performed with 80 W, 150 W, 200 W inputs, gave results as follows:

Transmission type	Average efficiency at 150 W
Derailleurs	93–95%
3-speed gear hubs	92–95%
7- and 14-speed gear hubs	89–91%

Efficiency testing of bicycle gearing systems is complicated by a number of factors – in particular, all systems tend to be better at higher power rates. 200 W will drive a typical bicycle at 20 miles per hour (32 km/h), while athletes can achieve 400 W, at which point efficiencies "approaching 98%" are claimed.

At a more typical 150 W, hub-gears tend to be around 2% less efficient than a derailleur system assuming that both systems are well maintained.

== See also ==
- Cogset
- Comparison of hub gears
- Cycling
- Electronic gear-shifting system
- Gear inches
- Cycling terminology
- Mountain biking
- Outline of cycling
- Sprocket
- Sturmey-Archer
