= Retro-direct =

Bicycle gearing mechanism

Design of the retro-direct gear, showing a system where the primary wheel sprocket is smaller and gives a higher gear than the secondary wheel sprocket; pedaling forwards uses the higher gear ratio

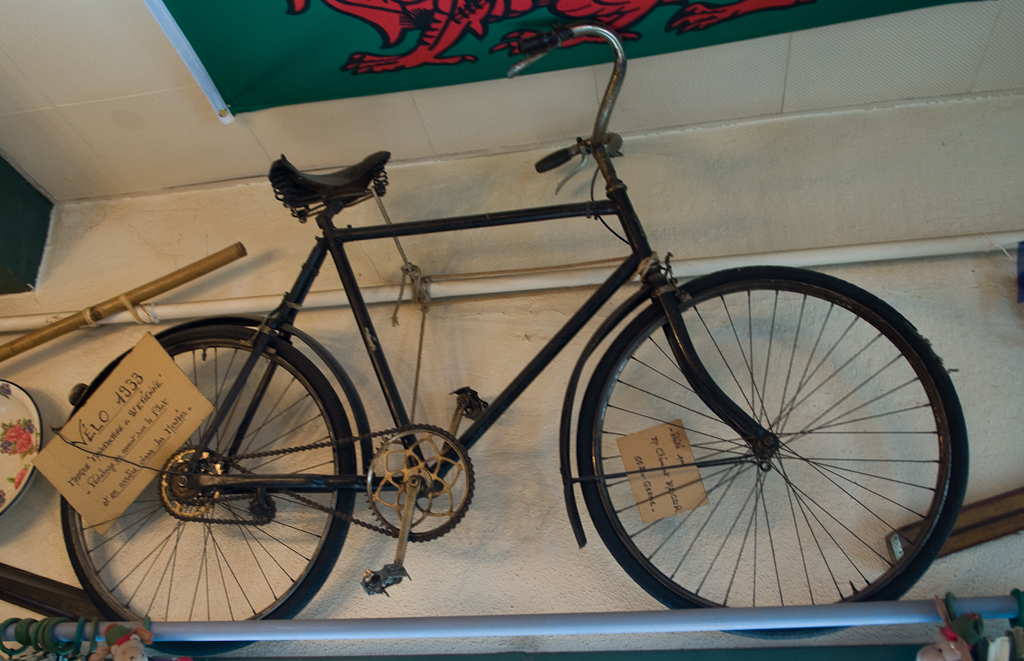
Bicycle with retro-direct

Retro-direct is a gearing mechanism used on some bicycles in the early 20th century, which provides a second gear ratio when pedaled backwards.

== History ==
Retro-direct was developed by French inventor Paul de Martin de Viviés (1833–1911). An early two-chain version was patented by in 1869 by Barberon and Meunier. A single-chain version was patented in 1903 by the bicycle manufacturer Hirondelle. Some hobbyists have converted modern bicycles to use retro-direct gearing.

== Technical details ==
In the single-chain system, the chain runs from the top of a chainring attached to the cranks to the top of a sprocket attached to the rear wheel hub with a freewheel, as with most bicycle chain drives. The chain then, usually, wraps around the rear sprocket to an idler sprocket between the rear wheel and the cranks, then runs back to a second sprocket attached to the rear wheel with a second freewheel, and finally returns to the bottom of the chain ring. Other configurations are possible, including one chain for forward pedalling, and a second crossed-chain configuration for reverse pedalling. Only one freewheel is engaged at a time, while the other spins backward freely. Since the chain wraps around the second sprocket in the opposite direction to the first sprocket, the cyclist needs only to pedal backwards to engage it. The small amount of out-of-line required of the chain is easily accommodated. The rear wheel cannot rotate backwards because the two freewheels try to drive the pedals forward and backward at the same time.

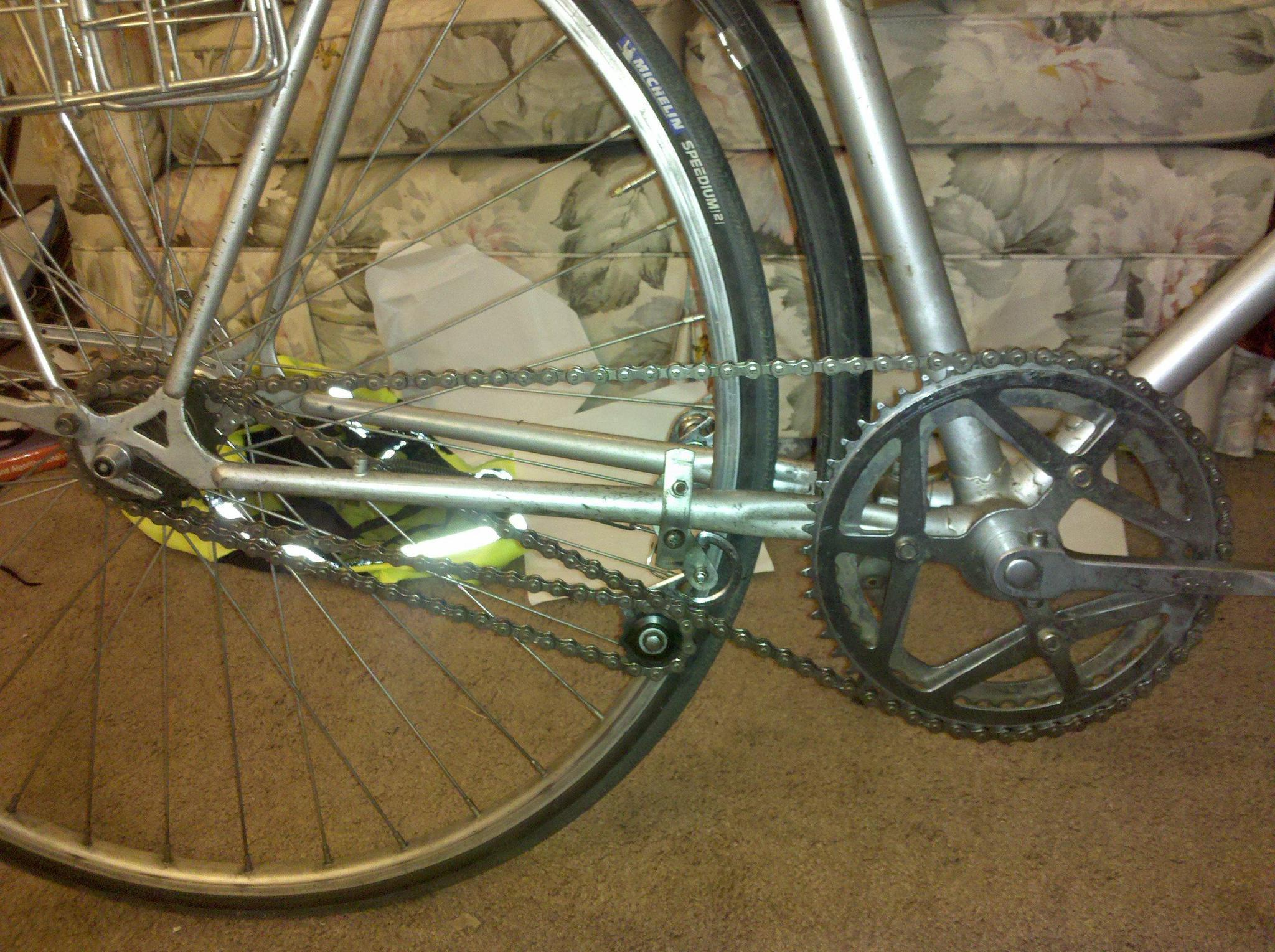
Close-up view of a retro-direct drivetrain on a bicycle.

Usually the second sprocket is larger, which provides the cyclist a lower gear for climbing steep inclines simply by pedaling backwards. While most historical examples of retro-direct bicycles used the reverse gear for climbing, several modern retro-direct riders prefer pedalling forward when standing to accelerate from rest and climb, and engaging the higher cruising gear while pedalling backwards.
