= Beier variable-ratio gear =

Mechanical drive

External image
- Diagrams of Beier drive

The Beier variable-ratio gear or Beier variator is a mechanical drive offering a continuously variable gear ratio between input and output.

The gear relies on the inter-meshing of a number of thin disks. By varying their separation, the effective radius of one disk varies, thus changing the overall gear ratio. This varying-radius principle is shared by a number of other variator mechanisms. An advantage of the Beier is that a large number of disks may be stacked on a common shaft, thus increasing its torque capacity for only a small increase in overall length.

The mechanism consists of a spring-loaded stack of thin disks on a central shaft. Around this are arranged other stacked disk packs on a number of planetary shafts, usually three. These shafts are mounted on swinging arms, so that they may be moved in and out together. The central disks are thin, with a thickened rim. The planet disks are tapered across their radius, at an included angle of around 3°. When the disks are intermeshed, they thus only contact at the rim of the central pack, no matter what the spacing of the shafts. These planetary disk packs have a gear meshing with a gear on the swing arms' fulcrum shafts, which in turn meshes with a central gear, used for the input drive. The central shaft is the output shaft and the gear is used as a reduction gear. When the disks are moved outwards, the central rim drives on the outside radius of the similar-sized tapered disks and the overall ratio is around 1:1. As the swing arms are moved inwards, the tapered disks are forced between the central rims against their spring-loading. The effective radius of the tapered disks is thus reduced and the gear ratio increases. The gear is made in a variety of ratio ranges, typically from 3:1 to 10:1. Overall efficiency is good, greater than 90%.

Unlike most other variators, but in common with the Hele-Shaw clutch, the Beier gear does not rely on friction between the disks, but rather on viscous drag through a thin oil film between them. This has little slip, less than 1%, and the lack of friction reduces the losses through heat and thus permits a small compact mechanism to still handle a high power. Oil is often pumped through the drive, also having a cooling effect.

== Applications ==
The Beier gearbox was an Austrian friction-type variable-ratio drive; a fully automatic version was developed for use with a bus engine.

The Beier variable-ratio gear was incorporated in the 1951 design of the E.145 Napier Nomad II, which first ran in December 1952. The Nomad II was a compound two-stroke diesel aircraft engine in which exhaust gas from the diesel drove an axial turbine, which in turn drove a 12-stage axial compressor used for scavenging and supercharging. The Beier drive coupled the turbomachine shafting to the piston-engine crankshaft, allowing the crankshaft to drive the compressor at low power and allowing surplus turbine power to be returned to the crankshaft at higher power settings.

In contemporary industrial use, the Beier variator is used as a mechanical adjustable-speed drive, commonly driven by an electric motor. The variator provides mechanical speed adjustment by changing the engagement between its driving and driven discs, and may be combined with a Cyclo reducer as a Beier-Cyclo variator for adjustable low-speed output.

== See also ==
- Hele-Shaw clutch
