= Hele-Shaw clutch =

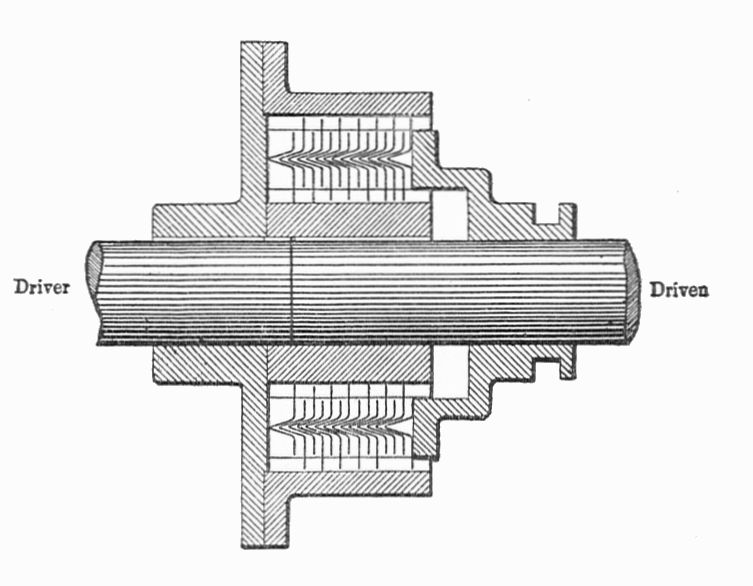
Hele-Shaw clutch, sectioned

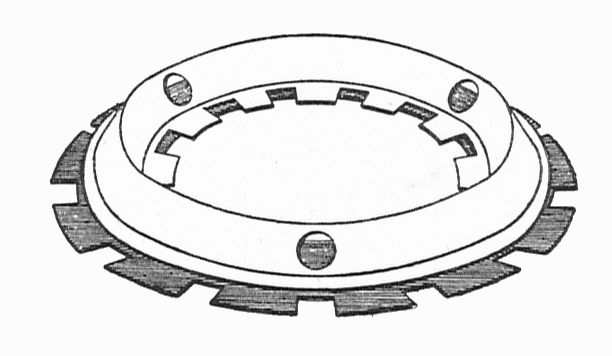
A single pair of plates of the Hele Shaw clutch

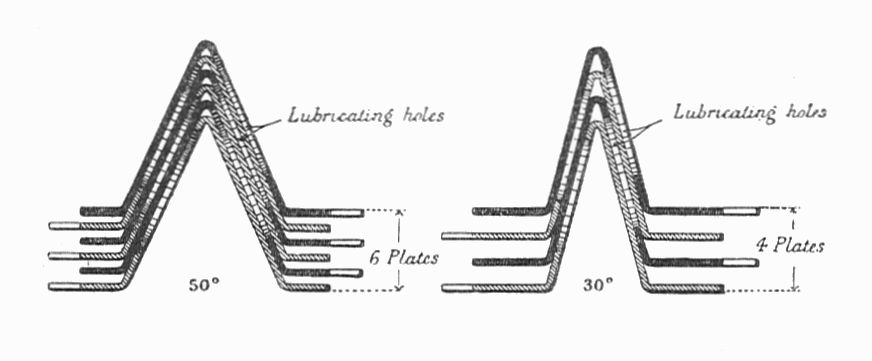
Section through a stack of plates

The Hele-Shaw clutch was an early form of multi-plate wet clutch, in use around 1900. It was named after its inventor, Professor Henry Selby Hele-Shaw, who was noted for his work in viscosity and flows through small gaps between parallel plates. The clutch was innovative in not relying upon friction, as other clutches did.

== Description ==
The clutch appears outwardly similar to most other multi-plate clutches. A stack of plates is enclosed in a housing with a divided central shaft. Alternate plates are keyed to either the input or output shafts, through either the inner or outer housings. A pressure plate is arranged at one end of the stack so that an axial force may be applied, compressing the stack and causing it to transmit the drive. Releasing the pressure releases the clutch.

In the Hele-Shaw clutch, the many plates are lightweight pressings from thin sheets of steel. Each plate has a ring pressed into it, V-shaped in section and forming a frustum of a cone with each side. The clutch is always used wet, so that there is a very thin layer of oil between the plates, even when compressed. For high powers there may be a great many of these plates, necessitated by the driving torque through of the keying teeth. The 1908 Itala Grand Prix car had a clutch with 64 plates.

The innovation of the Hele-Shaw clutch is that it does not operate by friction, as for most other clutches, but rather by the viscous flow behaviour of which Professor Hele-Shaw had made an in-depth study. When the plates are pressed together closely enough, the film between the plates is thin enough that the drag between them is sufficient to transmit the drive without slipping. Although there may be some slight slip in practice, unlike the fluid coupling there is no requirement for such slip to generate the flow velocity that the coupling depends upon, and so the Hele-Shaw clutch may approach a theoretical 100% efficiency.

Frictional clutches, usually leather-faced cone clutches, were in use before the Hele-Shaw clutch. Their difficulty was one of materials science and the lack of a suitable friction material, before asbestos clutch linings, that could handle the specific power / area at an elevated operating temperature. As the Hele-Shaw clutch did not rely on friction, it generated only a fraction of the heat of other designs and its construction was easily able to disperse this.

Both the multi-plate and the wet clutch were also in use beforehand. The innovation of the Hele-Shaw clutch is that the multiple plates were an inherent feature of the design, and also simple to manufacture, rather than being a crude duplication of multiple elements that were individually underpowered. The use of oil was also inherent, unlike other clutches that still basically relied on dry friction, with lubrication to avoid overheating when slipping.

== Applications ==
=== Cars ===
The clutch was introduced for cars and patented in 1905. Clutches were manufactured by the British Hele-Shaw Patent Clutch Co. Ltd. of Oldham. Its advantages were soon recognised, particularly its reliability and resistance to overheating when in heavy use. At a Paris motor show in 1907, around 80% of the cars exhibited used the Hele-Shaw clutch. At one time they were universally used on Parisian buses.

The multi-plate Hele-Shaw clutch with six alternating steel and phosphor bronze plates running in graphite powder was used in racecars such as the 1921 Grand Prix Sunbeams.

=== Reversing clutches ===
The Hele-Shaw clutch was also used for extremely high powers in both industry and for marine propulsion, of 1,000 hp and more.

When combined with an epicyclic gearbox, a pair of clutches could form a reversing gearbox. Engaging each clutch in turn provided a forwards and reverse motion, one direction being geared down in speed and increased in torque. As the clutches could be engaged quickly with only a light controlling force, these gearboxes became widely used in heavy steel rolling mills, where the rollers are driven forwards requiring full power, then quickly in reverse.

== See also ==
- Beier variable-ratio gear
