= Ellsworth Handcrafted Bicycles =

American bicycle manufacturer

- Type: Private
- Industry: Mountain bike manufacturing
- Founded: Ramona, California
- Founder: Tony Ellsworth
- Headquarters: Vancouver, Washington, U.S.
- Owner: Tony Ellsworth
- Website: EllsworthBikes.com

Ellsworth Handcrafted Bicycles is a bicycle manufacturer based in San Diego, California. Founded by Tony Ellsworth in 1991, they produced a wide range of handmade bicycles made in the U.S.: mountain, road, beach cruisers, BMX, and fat bikes. The brand has gone through four ownership changes since 2014, and now focus on producing high-quality mountain bikes specifically in the genres of XC, trail, and enduro. Ellsworth also produce a designer/cruiser bike known as "The Ride"

== History ==
The company was founded by Tony Ellsworth. In 1991, Tony Ellsworth built his first bicycle frame after a dramatic career change was brought on by deteriorating health. He built his first full-suspension mountain bike for his wife in 1993. By 1994, Tony was building bikes "for people whose names he didn't know," at which point he considered that he indeed built himself a business.

September 2014: BST Nano Carbon acquired Ellsworth. BST shifted the brand's location from Ramona, CA, to San Diego, CA. BST re-focused the brand to keep up with the industry-trend of manufacturing carbon fiber frames and updated their lineup's frame geometry to follow suit. BST planned on manufacturing the brand's frames and components at its San Diego facility, and they moved the aluminium frames to be manufactured by a separate Southern California vendor. Ellsworth did not release any bikes in 2015 as BST underestimated the costs associated with producing carbon fiber frames in California.

January 2016: Jonathan Freeman, a private investor from San Diego, bought the company from BST—the new owner bringing in much needed capital for the 25-year-old brand. Freeman worked hand-in-hand with Tony to bring a new and updated product range including both carbon fiber and aluminium alloy frames. The frames are produced in Taiwan and are assembled in San Diego, CA.

May 2018: South African Ellsworth Distributor, ASG Group, acquires Ellsworth. Ellsworth currently operates from its new facility in San Diego, CA, as a subsidiary of ASG North America. ASG also distributes other house brands into U.S., including SCICON.

December 2021: Ellsworth bicycles is acquired by RP Designs. Tony Ellsworth rejoins the company as Chief Development/Design Officer. Ellsworth announces intent to bring manufacturing to the United States, and to launch two bicycle models.

== Innovation ==
CURRENT: Ellsworth bicycles used Instant Center Tracking (ICT) technology, an Ellsworth-specific technology. Tony Ellsworth, founder of the company, holds nine patents related to ICT technology. The 2016 and newer bikes change the ICT linkage to Active Energy Efficient Suspension (AEES)- fully active rear suspension.

In 2004 Fallbrook Technologies partnered with Ellsworth to commercialize their NuVinci technology (a new drivetrain targeted for use on bicycles), and tried adapting its technology for other uses. The large NuVinci hub uses a new technology, a 'continuously variable planetary' drive train, to allow multiple gear ratios while removing the gears. Thus, a derailleur and multiple gears are no longer necessary. This technology is already in use on Ellsworth's 'The Ride', a cruising bike, which was designed specifically for the NuVinci. The Ride was scheduled to be a limited production run of only 500 units. However, after 135 of The Ride frames being built, the jig went out of alignment; due to poor sales of The Ride, Ellsworth decided to avoid the expense of fixing the jig and discontinued the model.

== Products ==
Ellsworth Truth 2007 mountain bike.

=== Trail bikes ===
- Evolution (current)
- Epiphany (current)
- Enlightenment (current)
- Evolve
- Glimpse
- Oracle (with Merlin)
- Truth
- Id
- Moment

=== All-Mountain/Enduro ===
- Rogue 40 (current)
- Rogue 60 (current)
- Method
- Moment SST
- Joker
- Aeon Isis

=== Freeride/Downhill ===
- Dare
- Rogue

=== Road bikes ===
- Coefficient
- Coercion
- Scant

=== Other ===
- The Ride
- Witness
- Specialist
- Roots

=== Wheels ===
- 26"
- 27.5"/650B
- 29"
- All Mountain
- Rogue
- Road Race

== Sponsorship ==
Ellsworth sponsored the Suzuki 24 Hour National Point Series in 2008, along with Infinit Nutrition. They will continue to sponsor the event through 2010.

Ellsworth resigned Pua Sawicki, the 2007 Female Mountain Biker of the Year. She rode a Truth, produced by Ellsworth, during the 2008 season.

Four teams competing in the 2008 Primal Quest Adventure Expedition, a two-week endurance race held near Big Sky, Montana, were sponsored by Ellsworth. Three teams rode Truths, and one rode Epiphanies.

The beginning of 2009 saw the formation of the Ten Speed Drive/Ellsworth Factory Cycling Team. Part of the team's mission is reducing their environmental impact, and both Ten Speed Drive Racing, Inc. and Ellsworth will emphasize their commitment to the environment. The team will use Ellsworth's Scant scandium road bike frames.

In April 2009 Ellsworth announced it would sponsor Jack Reading, a profession downhill mountain biker from the United Kingdom. He rides a Dare, produced by Ellsworth.
