= Bicycle performance =

Measures of effectiveness of a bicycle

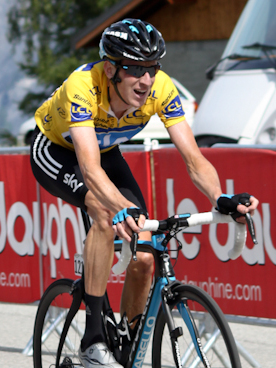
Bradley Wiggins in the yellow jersey, finishing the 2011 Critérium du Dauphiné.

Bicycle performance is measurable performance such as energy efficiency that affects how effective a bicycle is. Bicycles are extraordinarily efficient machines; in terms of the amount of energy a person must expend to travel a given distance, cycling is calculated to be the most efficient self-powered means of transportation.

The transport performance of bicycles is also exceptional in terms of ton kilometers. In terms of the ratio of cargo weight (payload) a bicycle can carry to the total bike weight, cycling (here under cargo biking) is also the most efficient means of cargo transportation.

== Mechanical efficiency ==
From a mechanical viewpoint, up to 99% of the mechanical energy delivered by the rider into the pedals is transmitted to the wheels (clean, lubricated new chain at 400 W), although the use of gearing mechanisms reduces this by 1–7% (clean, well-lubricated derailleurs and a straight chainline), 4–12% (chain with 3-speed hubs), or 10–20% (shaft drive with 3-speed hubs). The higher efficiencies in each range are achieved at higher power levels and in direct drive (hub gears) or with large driven cogs (derailleurs).

== Energy efficiency ==
A human traveling on a bicycle at 16–24 km/h (10–15 mph), using only the power required to walk, is the most energy-efficient means of human transport generally available. Air drag, which increases with the square of speed, requires increasingly higher power outputs relative to speed. A bicycle in which the rider lies in a supine position is referred to as a recumbent bicycle or, if covered in an aerodynamic fairing to achieve very low air drag, as a velomobile.

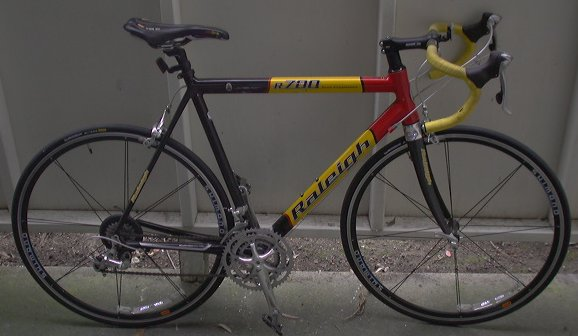
Racing bicycles are light in weight, allow for free motion of the legs, gives the rider a position which is both relatively comfortable and aerodynamic, have stiffness for good power transfer, and feature high gear ratios and low rolling resistance.

According to a study a human at 70 kg (150 lb) requires about 60 watts to walk at 5 km/h (3.1 mph) on firm and flat ground, while according to a calculator at kreuzotter.de the same person and power output on an ordinary bicycle will travel at 15 km/h (9.3 mph), so in these conditions the energy expenditure of cycling is about one-third that of walking the same distance. Uphill and downhill speeds vary according to the slope of the incline and the effort of the rider. Uphill cycling requires more power to overcome gravity and speeds are therefore lower and/or the heartrate is higher than during flat riding conditions. With medium effort a cyclist can pedal 8–10 km/h up a gentle incline. Riding on grass, sand, mud, or snow will also slow a rider down. Without pedaling downhill a bicycle rider can easily reach speeds of 20–40 km/h down a gentle 5% slope and speeds exceeding 50 km/h on steeper inclines.

=== Energy output ===
How much power humans can generate and for how long varies with physical form. The specific power may be expressed in watts per kilogram of body mass. Active cyclists can produce from 1.0 W/kg (novice female) 2.2 W/kg (average untrained male), 3.0 W/kg (male, fair or female, good [fitness]), and 6.6 W/kg (top-class male athletes) at their functional threshold power (about one hour). 5 W/kg is about the level reachable by excellent male or exceptional female amateurs. Maximum sustained power levels during one hour are recorded from about 200 W (NASA experimental group of "healthy men") to 500 W (Eddy Merckx on ergometer 1975). For a day's pedalling these figures can roughly be halved, for a minute's duration doubled.

=== Energy input ===
The energy input to the human body is in the form of food energy, usually quantified in kilocalories [kcal] or kilojoules [kJ, which is equivalent to kWs or kilowatt-seconds]. This can be related to a certain distance travelled and to body weight, giving units such as kJ/km⋅kg. The rate of food consumption, i.e. the amount consumed during a certain period of time, is the input power. This can be measured in kcal/day or in J/s = W (1000 kcal/d ≈ 48.5 W).

This input power can be determined by measuring oxygen uptake, or in the long term food consumption, assuming no change of weight. This includes the power needed just for living, called the basal metabolic rate BMR or roughly the resting metabolic rate.

The required food can also be calculated by dividing the output power by the muscle efficiency. This is 18–26%. From the example above, if a 70 kg person is cycling at 15 km/h by expending 60 W and a muscular efficiency of 20% is assumed, roughly 1 kJ/km⋅kg extra food is required. For calculating the total food required during the trip, the BMR must first be added to the input power. If the 70 kg person is an old, short woman, her BMR could be 60 W, in all other cases a bit higher. Viewed this way the efficiency in this example is effectively halved and roughly 2 kJ/km⋅kg total food is required.

Although this shows a large relative increase in food required for low power cycling, in practice it is hardly noticed, as the extra energy cost of an hour's cycling can be covered with 50 g nuts or chocolate. With long and fast or uphill cycling, the extra food requirement however becomes evident.

To complete the efficiency calculation, the type of food consumed determines the overall efficiency. For this the energy needed to produce, distribute and cook the food must be considered.

== Typical speeds ==
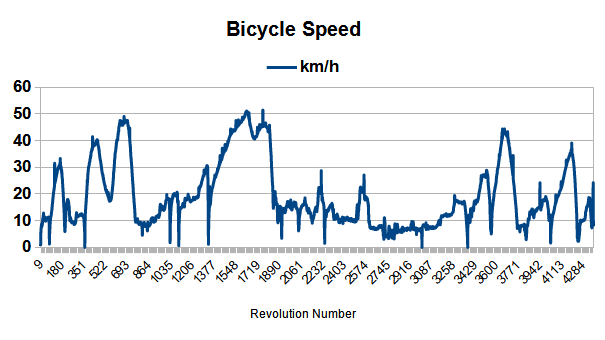
Graph showing variable bicycle speed on hilly terrain.

In utility cycling there is large variations in speeds reached. An elderly person on an upright roadster might do less than 10 km/h (6.2 mph) while a fitter or younger person could easily do twice that on the same bicycle. For cyclists in Copenhagen, the average cycling speed is 15.5 km/h (9.6 mph). The fitness and cadence of the rider, bicycle tire pressure and sizes, gear ratios, slope of the terrain affect the overall speed of the rider. A person pedalling with 100 W power can achieve 5.5 m/s on a roadster, 7.5 m/s on a racing bicycle, 10 m/s with a faired HPV and 14 m/s with an ultimate HPV. In competitive cycling a sustainable high speed is augmented by the use of light materials, low-resistance tires, aerodynamic design, and the aerodynamic effects of the peloton. The group can maintain a higher speed over extended distance due to various cyclists taking turns at the head of the wind then dropping behind to rest. A team time trial produces the same effect.

Fitness cyclists use a speedometer or cyclocomputer to measure, record, and share several variables including speed, gradient, distance, time, cadence, slope, power (watts), temperature, GPS data, route, and even heart rate.

=== Cycling speed records ===
The highest speed officially recorded for any human-powered vehicle (HPV) on level ground and with calm winds and without external aids (such as motor pacing and wind-blocks, but including a defined amount of gravity assist) is 144.18 km/h (89.59 mph) set in 2016 by Todd Reichert in the Eta Speedbike, a streamlined recumbent bicycle. In the 1989 Race Across America, a group of HPVs crossed the United States in just 5 days. The highest speed officially recorded for a bicycle ridden in a conventional upright position under fully faired conditions was 82 km/h (51 mph) over 200 m. That record was set in 1986 by Jim Glover on a Moulton AM7 at the Human Powered Speed Championships during Expo86 World Fair in Vancouver. The fastest bicycle speed in slipstream is 296 km/h (183.9 mph), set by Denise Mueller-Korenek in 2018 on the Bonneville Salt Flats. This involved drafting behind a dragster.

=== Cycling speed wobble ===
Dangerous steering wobble or shimmy may occur at high speeds, and also lower speeds with frames with high flexibility coupled with inadequate damping.

== Reduction of weight and rotating mass ==
There has been major corporate competition to lower the weight of racing bikes in order to be faster uphill and accelerating. The UCI sets a limit of 6.8 kg on the minimum weight of bicycles to be used in sanctioned races.

=== Advantages of reduced mass ===
For cycling on the level at a constant speed, a large weight reduction saves only a negligible amount of power and it is on the contrary beneficial to add mass in the form of aerodynamic improvements. But for climbing steeply, any weight reduction can be felt directly. E.g., a reduction of 10% of the total system weight (bicycle, rider, and luggage combined) will save nearly 10% power.

A reduced mass is also directly felt when accelerating. For example, the Analytic Cycling calculator gives a time/distance advantage of 0.16 s/188 cm for a sprinter with 500 g lighter wheels. In a criterium race, if a rider has to brake entering each corner, then this is wasted as heat. For a flat criterium at 40 km/h, 1 km circuit, 4 corners per lap, 10 km/h speed loss at each corner, one hour duration, there would be 160 corner "jumps". For 90 kg rider and bike, this adds roughly one third effort compared to the same ride at a steady speed, and a mass reduction of 10% of the total system weight (bicycle, rider, and luggage combined) could thus give about a 3% advantage.

=== Advantages of light wheels ===
The mass of tires and rims must be accelerated linearly and rotationally. It can be shown that the effect of rim and tire mass of typical spoked wheels is effectively doubled. Reducing their mass is thus especially noticeable in the case of sprints and corner "jumps" in a criterium.

== Power required ==
There are well-known equations that give the power required to overcome the various resistances mainly as a function of speed and operational parameters.

Power curves against speed for different components: – Air drag power is initially very low and increases with the cube of the speed. – Rolling resistance power is higher at first but rises only gently. – Climbing a 5% grade is seen to be almost the same as continual acceleration with 0.5 m/s^{2}.

=== Air drag ===
The power $P_D$ needed to overcome air drag or resistance is:

$P_D\, =\tfrac12\, \rho\, v_r^3\, C_D\, A$ in still air, or

$P_D\, =\tfrac12\, \rho\, v_a^2\, v_r\, C_D\, A$ in a headwind,

where

$\rho$ is the air density, which is about 1.225 kg/m^{3} at sea level and 15 deg. C.
$v_r$ is the speed relative to the road,
$v_a$ is the apparent headwind, and
$C_D\, A$ is a characteristic area times its associated drag coefficient.

The concept of apparent wind is only directly applicable here if it comes from a true headwind or tailwind. Then $v_a$ is the scalar sum of $v_r$ and the headwind or the difference between $v_r$ and the tailwind. If this difference is negative, $P_D$ must be regarded as assistance rather than resistance. If however the wind has a sideways component, the apparent wind must be calculated with a vector sum and, especially if the bicycle is streamlined, the calculation of lateral and drag forces becomes more complex; a proper treatment involves considering the forces on the surfaces like the forces on sails.

The drag coefficient depends on the shape of the object and on the Reynolds number, which itself depends on $v_a$. However, if $A$ is the cross sectional area, $C_D$ can be roughly approximated as 1 for usual cycling speeds of a rider on an upright bicycle.

=== Rolling resistance ===
The power $P_R$ for overcoming the tires' rolling resistances is given by:

$$P_R = v_r \, m g \cos(\arctan s) C_{rr} \approx v_r m g C_{rr}$$

where $g$ is gravity, nominally 9.8 m/s^2, $s$ is the slope (rise over run), and $m$ is mass (kg). The approximation can be used with all normal coefficients of rolling resistance $C_{rr}$. Usually this is assumed to be independent of $v_r$ (speed of the bicycle on the road) although it is recognized that it increases with speed. Measurements on a roller-mechanism give low-speed coefficients of 0.003 to 0.006 for a variety of tires inflated to their maximum recommended pressures, increasing about 50% at 10 m/s.

=== Climbing power ===
The vertical climbing power $P_S$ on slope $s$ is given by

$P_S = v_r m g \sin(\arctan s) \approx v_r m g s$.

This approximation approaches the real solution for small, i.e. normal grades. For extremely steep slopes such as 0.35 the approximation gives an overestimation of about 6%.

As this power is used to increase the potential energy of bike and rider, it is returned as motive power when going downhill and not lost unless the rider brakes or travels faster than desired.

=== Power for acceleration ===
The power $P_A$ for accelerating the bike and rider having total mass m with acceleration a and rotationally also the wheels having mass $m_w$ is:

$$P_A \approx v_r (m+m_w) a$$

The approximation is valid if $m_w$ is assumed to be concentrated at the rims and tires and these are not slipping. The mass of such wheels can thus be counted twice for this calculation, independent of the wheels' sizes.

As this power is used to increase the kinetic energy of bike and rider, it is returned when decelerating and not lost unless the rider brakes or travels faster than desired.

=== Total power ===
The total power can be summed as:

$$P\, = (P_D\, + P_R\, + P_S\, + P_A \,)/ \eta \,$$

where $\eta \,$ is the mechanical efficiency of the drive train described at the beginning of this article.

Given this simplified equation, one can calculate some values of interest. For example, assuming no wind, one gets the following results for power delivered to the pedals (watts):

- 175 W for a 90 kg bike + rider to go 9 m/s (32 km/h or 20 mph) on the flat (76% of effort to overcome aerodynamic drag), or 2.6 m/s (9.4 km/h or 5.8 mph) on a 7% grade (2.1% of effort to overcome aerodynamic drag).
- 300 W for a 90 kg bike + rider at 11 m/s (40 km/h or 25 mph) on the flat (83% of effort to overcome aerodynamic drag) or 4.3 m/s (15 km/h or 9.5 mph) on a 7% grade (4.2% of effort to overcome aerodynamic drag).
- 165 W for a 65 kg bike + rider to go 9 m/s (32 km/h or 20 mph) on the flat (82% of effort to overcome aerodynamic drag), or 3.3 m/s (12 km/h or 7.4 mph) on a 7% grade (3.7% of effort to overcome aerodynamic drag).
- 285 W for a 65 kg bike + rider at 11 m/s (40 km/h or 25 mph) on the flat (87% of effort to overcome aerodynamic drag) or 5.3 m/s (19 km/h or 12 mph) on a 7% grade (6.1% of effort to overcome aerodynamic drag).

Reducing the weight of the bike + rider by 1 kg would increase speed by 0.01 m/s at 9 m/s on the flat (5 seconds in a 32 km/h (20 mph), 40-kilometre (25 mile) time trial). The same reduction on a 7% grade would be worth 0.04 m/s (90 kg bike + rider) to 0.07 m/s (65 kg bike + rider). If one climbed for 1 hour, saving 453 grams (1 lb) would gain between 69 and 107 metres (225 and 350 ft) – less effect for the heavier bike + rider combination (e.g., 0.06 km/h (0.04 mph) ⋅ 1 h ⋅ 1,600 m (5,200 ft)/mi = 69 m (226 ft)). For reference, the big climbs in the Tour de France and the Giro d'Italia have the following average grades:

Giro d'Italia gradients

- Stelvio Pass: 7.45% over 24.3 km
- Colle delle Finestre: 9.1% over 18.6 km
- Colle dell'Agnello: 6.5% over 22 km
- Passolanciano-Maielletta, also known as Blockhaus: 9.4% over 22 km
- Plan de Corones: 10% over 5.2 km
- Mortirolo: 10.4% over 12.5 km
- Monte Zoncolan: 12% over 10.1 km

Tour de France gradients

- Tourmalet: 7%
- Galibier: 7.5%
- Alpe d'Huez: 8.6%
- Mont Ventoux: 7.1%

== See also ==
- Bicycle
- Bicycle and motorcycle dynamics, physics affecting handling and rideability of bikes
  - Bicycle and motorcycle geometry
- Cycling power meter, measurement of power output on bicycles
- Cyclocomputer, instrumentation on a bicycle
- Gear inches, how far a bicycle travels per pedal revolution
- Outline of cycling
