= Enviolo continuously variable transmission =

Roller-based continuously variable transmission

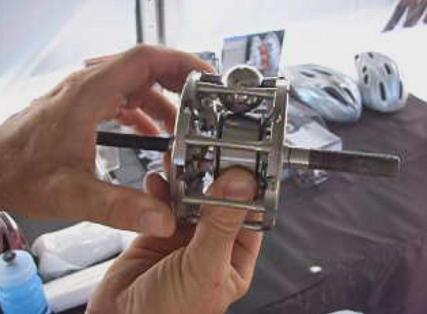
Internal CVP shift machine.

Enviolo is the name of a stepless transmission technology used in the internally-geared bicycle hubs produced by the company of the same name. This technology was originally produced under the name NuVinci.

== History ==
Mechanical variators existed since the 1800s, and have been used successfully in machinery, particularly the Kopp tilting ball variator. Various attempts have been made to implement them in vehicle transmissions, but commercial success has been elusive.

In 2017 it was announced that NuVinci Cycling would be renamed to Enviolo. In February 2018, the company filed for Chapter 11 bankruptcy. In June 2018, the company emerged from restructuring under Chapter 11 bankruptcy, and under new ownership the bike division was rebranded as Enviolo.

== Design ==
The Enviolo CVT gear system uses a set of rotating and tilting balls positioned between the input and output discs of a transmission. Tilting the balls changes their contact diameters and varies the speed ratio. As a result, the Enviolo CVT system offers seamless and continuous transition to any ratio within its range. The gear ratio is shifted by tilting the axles of the spheres in a continuous fashion, to provide different contact radii, which in turn drive input and output discs. The system has multiple "planets" to transfer torque through multiple fluid patches. The spheres are placed in a circular array around a central idler (the sun) and contact separate input and output traction discs. This configuration allows input and output to be concentric and compact. The result is the ability to sweep the transmission through the entire ratio range smoothly, while in motion, under load, or stopped.

Two factors allow the Enviolo CVT to provide a continuously variable ratio range in a compact package:

1. The first is the geometric configuration of the drive, which is based on differing contact ratio of a sphere. Contacting a rotating sphere at two different locations relative to the sphere's rotational axis will provide a “gear ratio”, which can range from underdrive to overdrive depending on the location of the contact points for input and output torque and speed.
2. The second factor is elastohydrodynamic lubrication (EHL). Transmissions that use EHL to transfer power are known as traction drives. A traction drive transmission operates utilizing a traction fluid that, under normal circumstances, provides lubrication for the drive. When this fluid undergoes high contact pressures under rolling contact between the two very hard elements, the spheres and the discs, the fluid undergoes a near-instantaneous phase transition to an elastic solid. Within this patch of traction the molecules of the fluid stack up and link to form a solid, through which shear force and thus torque can be transferred. Note that the rolling elements are actually not in physical contact.

== Comparison to conventional transmissions ==
The Enviolo CVT system has a relatively small number of parts. Most CVTs have lower mechanical efficiency than competitive conventional transmissions.

Since any CVT may allow a power plant, human or motorized, to operate at (or closer to) its speed of optimal efficiency, output torque or output power, the Enviolo CVT may improve a system's overall efficiency or performance compared to a 'conventional' geared transmission, but only if such gain in the efficiency or performance of the power plant exceeds any loss in efficiency or performance that may be introduced by replacing the conventional transmission with the Enviolo CVT. For example, if the Enviolo CVT were only 90% as efficient as the conventional transmission it replaced, the gain in operating efficiency from the power plant would have to be 11% (i.e., 1/0.90 − 1 = 0.11 or 11%) before the overall efficiency improved. The company does not provide any numbers relating to efficiency of their transmissions, and has declined to do so when requested.

The Enviolo CVT further offers the ability to accept multiple inputs while varying speed and ratio, managing torque and providing single or multiple power outlets. By supporting a torque-demand rather than a speed-demand control solution, the Enviolo CVT solves the low-speed acceleration problem inherent in some torque-demand vehicles.

The Enviolo CVT's simple design and low part count make it easily scalable, with tooling that can be used across a wide variety of applications.

== Comparison to other CVTs ==
The Enviolo uses rolling traction to transfer torque, just as do toroidal transmissions. However, unlike toroidal CVTs, it distributes the transmitted torque over several spheres, thus lowering total clamping force required.

This arrangement allows the Enviolo CVT to combine the smooth, continuous power transfer of a CVT with the utility of a conventional planetary gear drive.

As with other traction-type CVTs, transmission of torque through the Enviolo CVT involves some relative sliding between the torque-transmitting contact patches. This is because, for any given contact patch, parts of the ball are going in a slightly different direction and at slightly different speeds than the disc (this phenomenon of traction-type CVTs is referred to as "contact spin"). "The spin velocity (or drill speed) is defined as the difference in the rotational speed of the driving and driven rollers in a direction perpendicular to the contact patch plane. It is caused by the relative difference in surface speeds of both elements across the contact patch and is a major source of power loss in traction drive CVT’s." In all traction-type CVTs, this relative sliding necessarily occurs between surfaces which are under the very high clamping pressures required to ensure torques are transmitted reliably. This relative sliding under high pressures cause transmission losses (inefficiency). Fallbrook Technology refuse to publish any efficiency data for the Enviolo CVT. However, the NuVinci is a variant on the "tilting-ball drive" type of continuously variable transmission (CVT), and the efficiency of "tilting-ball drive" type CVTs is typically in the range of 70% to 89%. However, its geometry does differ significantly from the Kopp type of tilting ball variator in the reference in that the NuVinci has its torque transfer contacts on the outside diameter rather than the inside diameter, which puts the idler (an element that reacts clamping load) in compression rather than tension, and because the idler contact surface is not conformal as in the Kopp design. In general because of the way the CVT is set up, it is more efficient at a 1:1 ratio compared to maximum overdrive or underdrive positions. Independent test results have shown that at 1:1 it is actually more efficient than comparable bicycle internal gear hubs, while at the ratio extremes it is slightly lower.

Torque inputs can be summed or divided, just as in a conventional planetary. Ratio control is stable, and can be actuated down the center line of the transmission, which again is similar to the proven planetary transmission. In most applications, there is no need for high-pressure hydraulics.

Other advantages shared with similar CVT designs include that the input and output shafts may be either in-line, offset, or in a U configuration (input and output both coaxial and coplanar), making the transmission simple, small, light and easy to package.

Fallbrook claims the transmission control is stable, linear and does not require a major control system development effort.

== Applications ==
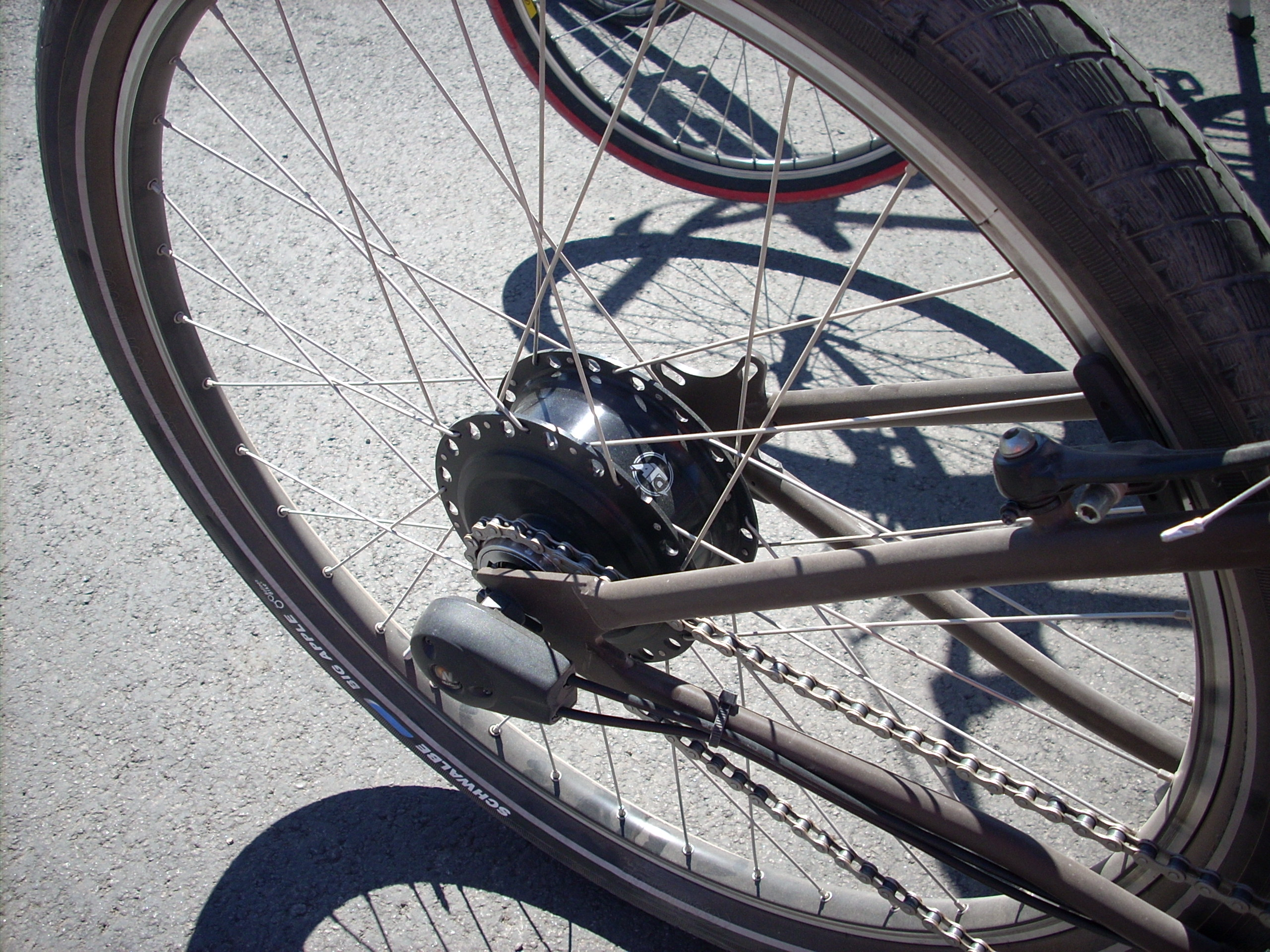
The 3.6 kg (8 lb) Enviolo rear hub. Comparatively, the newer Enviolo hubs from around 2010 weighs 2.4 kg (5.4 lb)

The Enviolo CVT may be applicable to many different products using a mechanical power transmission. The only application currently commercialized is the internally geared bicycle hub. The Enviolo CVT replaces derailleurs and other internally geared hubs, and provides a gear ratio range of about 350%, similar to that on bicycles with 8- or 9-speed hub gears, or with double chain rings (most racing or fast road bicycles). This range is somewhat less than the 526% range found on bicycles with a Rohloff 14-speed hub gear or most mountain/hybrid/touring bicycles with triple chainrings. By conventional standards, a Enviolo bicycle hub is considered heavy. The second generation model N171B weighs between 3.85 and 3.95 kilograms (8.5 and 8.7 lb), including freewheel and mounting hardware. The N360 model announced early September 2010 weighs 2.45 kg (5.4 lb). That same article points out that "the combined weight of Shimano SLX front and rear derailleurs, shifters, freehub and cassette comes out to about 1.3 kg (2.9 lb)". However, the Enviolo CVT is targeted towards the less weight-conscious (cruiser-, comfort-, and commuter) segments with the latest product introductions the N330 and N380 also being targeted at city, urban, trekking and eMTB (SUV) bikes. Their biggest advantage is the durability, while shifting under load and continuously, which is especially important with the powerful eBike drive systems.

The company is also developing products based on the CVT unit for automotive applications.

=== Bicycle hub gears ===
List of gears
| Brand | Product | Introduced | Discontinued | Speeds | Gear width | Weight (excluding auxiliary components) | Purpose |
|---|---|---|---|---|---|---|---|
| Fallbrook | NuVinci N171 | 2007 | 2010 | continuous | 350% (0.5 Under-Drive to 1.75 Over-Drive) | 3.85–3.95 kg (8.5–8.7 lb) | City |
| Fallbrook | NuVinci N360 | 2010 | 2015 | continuous | 360% 0.5 underdrive to 1.8 overdrive | 2.45 kg (5.4 lb) | City |
| Fallbrook | NuVinci N330 | 2015 | | continuous | 330% nominal, 0.5 underdrive to 1.65 overdrive | 2.45 kg (5.4 lb) | City, Urban |
| Fallbrook | NuVinci N380 | 2015 | | continuous | 380% nominal, 0.5 underdrive to 1.9 overdrive | 2.45 kg (5.4 lb) | City, Urban, Trekking, eMTB (SUV) |

NuVinci has been rebranded to Enviolo as part of a bankruptcy restructuring. The former model N380 was renamed to TR for trekking. N330 is now the CI variant for city (CO for commercial renting systems is the same, but may offer different color schemes). Stronger models SP (sportive) and CA (cargo) have been added since.

== Awards and publicity ==
The system and associated bicycles have been the recipients of several awards. These include:

- Bicycling Magazine's Editor's Choice for Commuter Bike of the Year
- Technology of the Year and Bike of the Year in The Netherlands
- An iF Design EUROBIKE Gold 2008 Award

Bicycles equipped with Enviolo transmissions subsequently won iF Design EUROBIKE awards in 2010 and 2011.

Ellsworth Handcrafted Bicycles, a manufacturer of bicycle frames and wheels designed a bicycle around the Enviolo CVT. In 2007, The Ellsworth Ride received top honors in Popular Science magazine's annual Best of What's New review of significant new products.

== See also ==
- Comparison of hub gears
- Continuously variable transmission
- Variator
