= Swift Folder =

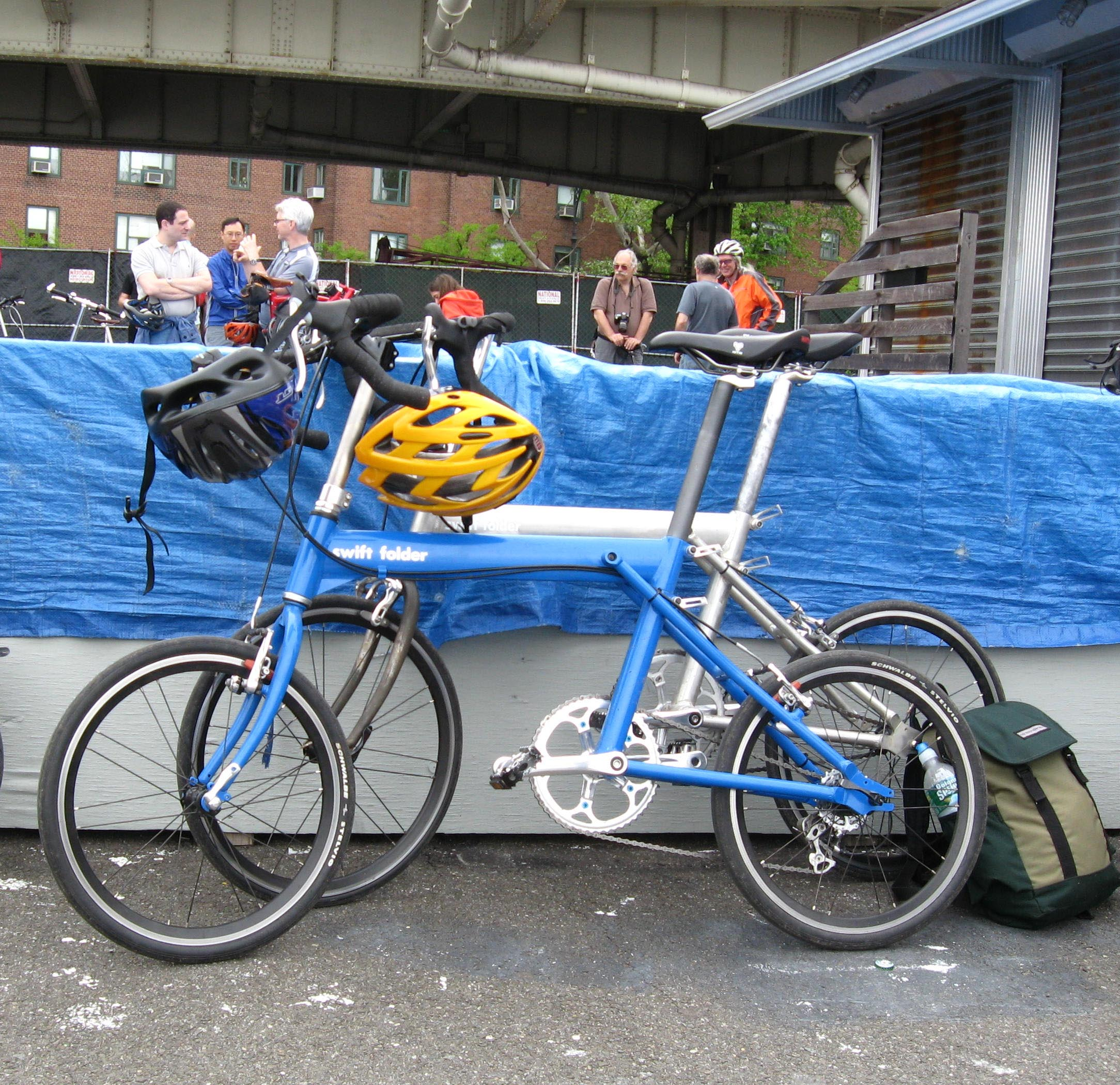
Two Swifts

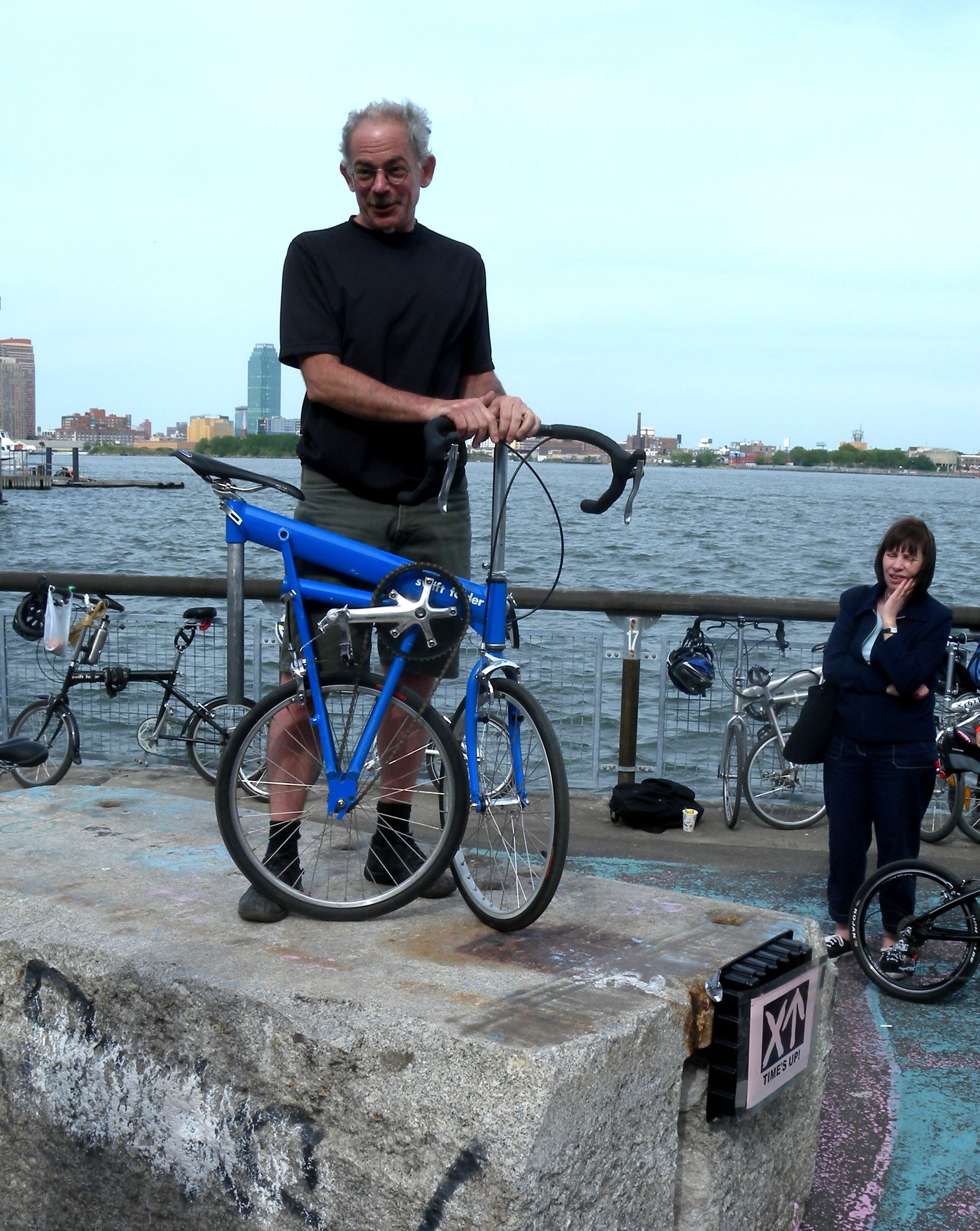
Folding

The Swift Folder is a folding bicycle employing a novel folding mechanism, designed by Peter Reich of Design Mobility Inc. of Brooklyn, New York, in collaboration with Jan VanderTuin of the Center for Appropriate Transport in Eugene, Oregon.

== Variants ==
=== Original steel frame ===
The Swift Folder was available from made available by Design Mobility in 1996 as a bare Chromoly frame manufactured in low volumes by Human Powered Machines of Eugene, Oregon for customers to build up themselves, or assembled into a complete bicycle to the customer's requirements.

=== Mass market aluminium alloy version ===
From 2004 to the end of 2016, a mass-market TIG welded 6061-T6 aluminium alloy version of the bicycle with a chromoly steel fork was manufactured in Taiwan under license by Xootr and sold fully assembled as the Xootr Swift, in single-speed and 8-speed models.

=== Reprised chromoly steel version ===
In 2023, a ten-speed, disc braked, chromoly steel version of the Swift was reprised for the North American market, manufactured by the Origami Bicycle Company with the blessing of Peter Reich, the original designer. The frame is faithful to the original geometry, but features vertical dropouts, no canti bosses, and a rear rack which keeps the bicycle free-standing when folded.

== Folding System ==
The Swift Folder design employs a vertical folding method, using the seat-post and a split seat-tube as the locking mechanism.

To fold, the seat-post is released from the two parts of the seat-tube by their respective quick release clamps, then pulled up into the upper part of the seat-tube to unlock the frame. A pivot in the main frame tube then allows the rear triangle (comprising the seat-stays, chain-stays and the lower portion of the seat-tube) and rear wheel to swing down and forward under the main tube. The seat-post is then slid back down through the upper part of the seat-tube to lock the rear wheel in the folded position.

To unfold, the seat-post is again pulled up to allow the rear triangle to swing back and up into the normal riding position. The seat-post is then slid down through the upper and lower parts of the seat-tube, locking the rear triangle and wheel into place.

The Swift frame is simple and robust, and allows a quick fold, but when folded is not as compact as some other folding bicycle designs. The bottom bracket forms part of the folding rear triangle, and as a result the bottom bracket to rear fork-end distance remains constant throughout the fold. This keeps the chain tension constant, which is an advantage when the Swift frame is used in a fixed-gear, single speed, or hub gear bicycle.

== Construction ==
The frame is generally built to common "industry-standard" sizes and threads, and can accommodate a wide variety of gear systems, brakes and other components. The rear fork spacing of 132.5mm can accommodate most standard road and mountain bike wheel-hubs.

The seat post, which is crucial to the rigidity of the folding mechanism, has an OD of 34.0mm. The individual seat tubes prior to completion will receive a seat post of 33.9mm, but, because of the frame construction, the two parts of the seat tube are reamed in a single operation so that there is no lip, with a resultant slight loss of material, and a 34.0mm OD seat post became the factory standard. In practice, a 33.9mm OD seat post, as found on the Brompton and Tern, will often work, and Xootr offered a Cane Creek Thudbuster seat post for the Swift that had an OD of 33.9mm.

The Swift Folder is normally fitted with "20 inch" wheels. The standard ISO 5775 wheel size is 406mm (traditionally known as 20x1 to 20x2.125), the same size used on most BMX bicycles. A wide variety of wheels and tires are available in this size.

The Swift Folder is also designed to work with 20 inch 451mm wheels. The linear pull brakes that come standard with the Swift will not work with 451s. The frame is designed to work with Caliper brakes with the larger wheels. The wheelbase is 40.5 inches (103 cm)

== Reviews ==
Reviews of the Swift have generally been positive. The Swift has been praised for its responsive, comfortable ride, its stiff frame, its light weight, its low step-through height, and its use of standard as opposed to proprietary parts for the components. This includes the wheels, tires, handlebars, seat, shifter, brakes, chainring and cogset, all of which can easily be replaced. Reviews usually call out the large folded size and cumbersome folded shape as a disadvantage. It is sometimes also pointed out that the Swift doesn't stand when folded. There was some disagreement as to whether its price was high for the range, though commentary on that point tended to be muted as the price for the Xootr Swift was generally in line with mass market folding bikes.

Given the generally positive reviews and the competitive price, it is likely that the large folded size was the sticky point for many buyers, as many more bicycles with higher pricetags and smaller sizes have been sold.
