= Xootr =

American folding kick scooter manufacturer

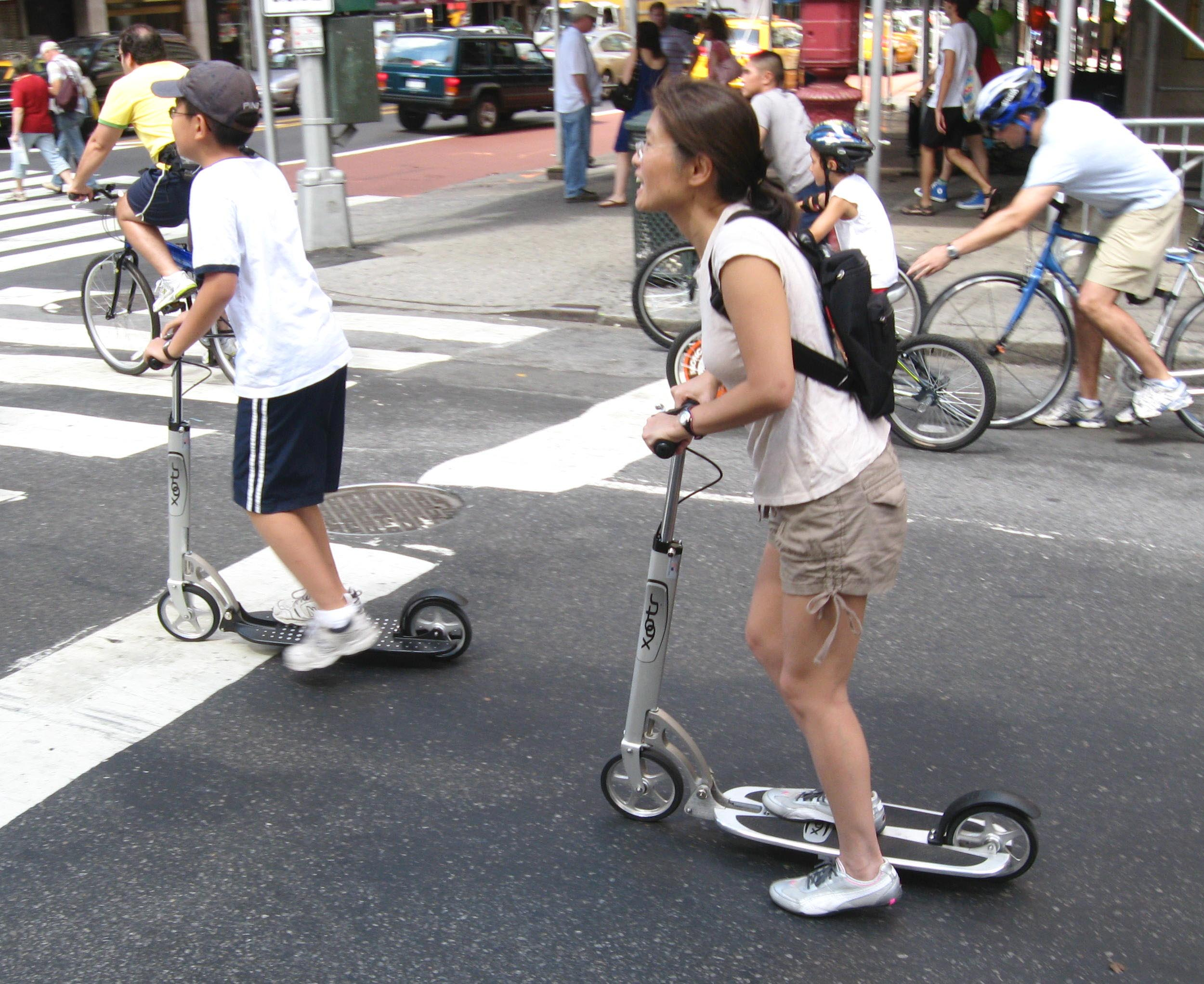
Xootr Mg (left) and Xootr Street (right) models in use at New York City

Xootr (pronounced "zoo-ter") is an American manufacturer of folding kick scooters and was formerly a seller of folding bicycles. Xootr scooters are characterized by 180mm wheels with aluminum hubs, and a hand brake for the front wheel (for the rear on old models). One defining feature of Xootr scooters is the relatively large wheels they are equipped with, as well as the hinge system, which locked with a pin until 2015, and then with the Quick Click latch thereafter.

Xootr scooters were originally introduced in 1999 by Nova Cruz Products. From 2003 to September 2026, the Xootr scooter was manufactured and sold by Xootr LLC. The Xootr is currently manufactured and sold by Step Shop (Netherlands).

== Manufacturer ==
Xootr began when Karl Ulrich, Nathan Ulrich, and Tom Miner (along with partners, Lunar Design and Cheskin Research, and several other investors) founded Nova Cruz Products. Nova Cruz designed, manufactured, and sold the Xootr kick scooter. Including the Xootr eX3 electric scooter, and the Voloci electric motorbike.

== Products ==
=== Kick scooter models ===
Name	Deck	Max. Rider Load	Components	Availability
Ultra Cruz	9-layers of birchwood laminated in polyurethane	800 (136 kg)	N/A	Available
Mg	Solid cast magnesium. Available in Black, Red, and Blue	800 lb (113 kg)	Single-component deck-rear wheel assembly.	Available
Roma	6061-T6 aluminum	800 lb (136 kg)	N/A	Available
Venus	6061-T6 aluminum	800 lb (136 kg)	N/A	Available
Street	6061-T6 aluminum	800 lb (136 kg)	N/A	Available
eX3	Solid cast aluminum	800 lb (113 kg)	Battery-powered electric motor. Single-component deck-rear wheel assembly.	Discontinued
Comp	Carbon fiber deck	300 lb (136 kg)	N/A	Discontinued

=== Swift folding bicycle (discontinued) ===
The Swift Folder is a folding bicycle designed by Peter Reich of Design Mobility Inc. of Brooklyn, New York, in collaboration with Jan VanderTuin of the Center for Appropriate Transport in Eugene, Oregon. The Swift Folder folds more quickly, though less compactly, than many other folding bicycles. From 2004 until about the end of 2016, the bicycle was sold under license by Xootr as the Xootr Swift — fully assembled to a standard specification, in a choice of single or 8-speed models.

=== Bicycle rack system ===
The Xootr CrossRack Bicycle Rack enables the mounting of a standard bicycle bag to almost any bicycle especially bicycles with small wheels.

=== Hand trucks ===
Xootr markets a line of folding hand trucks as well.

=== Clothing ===
Xootr markets its own line of baseball caps and tee-shirts.

=== Wheels ===
Xootr wheels were originally sold in two styles: standard (translucent yellow) and ultra (black), with the ultra wheels having 10% lower rolling resistance.

Teams using Xootr wheels with a custom rubber formulation won the top three places at the All-American Soap Box Derby Ultimate Speed championships in July 2008.

== In popular culture ==
The Xootr was featured in the film Little Manhattan, where a Xootr Street serves as the primary means of transportation for the main character, Gabe. In one scene, one of his friends has a Xootr Ultra Cruz while another friend makes do with a Razor.
