= Bickerton (bicycle) =

Aluminium frame folding bicycle brand

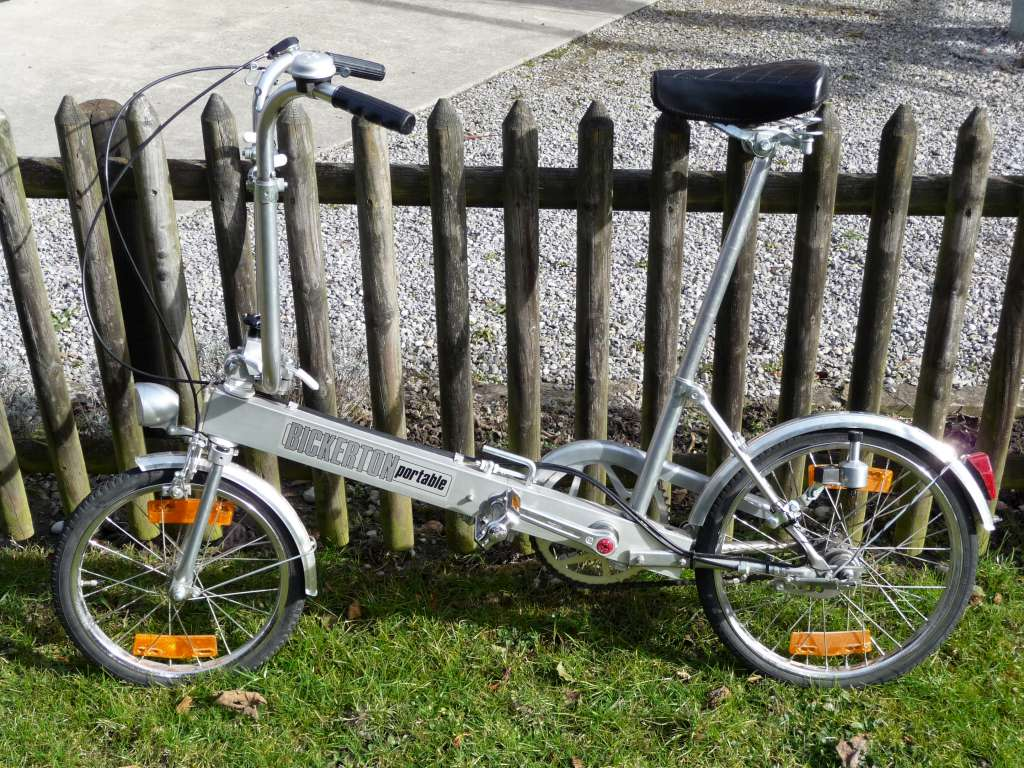
Bickerton Portable

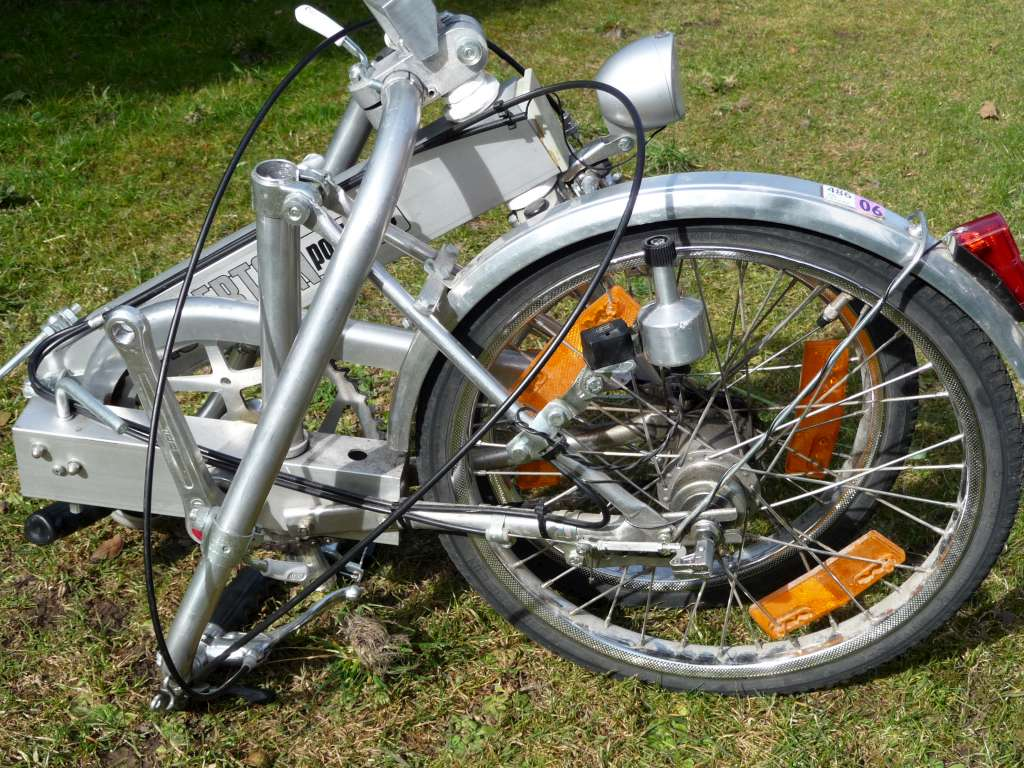
Bickerton Portable folded

The Bickerton, also called the Bickerton Portable, was a portable aluminium folding bicycle designed by Harry Bickerton and manufactured in the UK and Australia between 1971 and 1989. Bickerton, an accomplished engineer, suffered a three-year driving ban for drunk driving in 1970 following a car crash, and invented the bike for himself, to be carried onto public transport or stored in the trunk of a car as small as an Austin Mini.

== Origins ==
The Bickerton was a portable bicycle launched when folding bicycles tended to be 51 cm (20 in) step-through frames with a simple hinge, such as the folding variant of the Raleigh Twenty. The first Bickerton was made entirely of aluminium profiles, without any welds. The prototype was unique, lightweight 8.8 kg (18 lbs) and with a small folded size (76 cm x 51 cm x 23 cm). For its day, it broke new ground in bicycle manufacturing.

== Production history ==
Production started in 1972 in Codicote, Hertfordshire, at around 300 units in the first two years. The weight was 9.1 kg, strengthened to accommodate heavier riders than Bickerton himself. TCK Group of Aston bought the manufacturing licence, and increased production up to 1,000 bikes a year during the 1973 oil crisis. The bike was heavily promoted on TV with the slogan "Go bag a Bickerton", a reference to the dual-purpose bag, which could be used to hold the bike or as a pannier attached to the handlebars. It was cited by Andrew Ritchie as one of his inspirations in creating the highly successful Brompton bicycle.

By 1977 the company was bankrupt, as a worldwide recession dented sales significantly. Bickerton took back the licence, but resold it to an Australian company based in Melbourne, who established world sales licenses in Germany, the US, and Sweden. In those markets, the bikes were assembled from kits shipped from Australia. Innovations around this time included handlebar and seat stem struts to increase rigidity. Some 50,000 Australian Bickertons were produced, before the company folded production in 1982 (secondhand Bickertons are still found in Australia). Finally, Bickerton produced bikes again in the UK from Welwyn Garden City, trading successfully until the late 1980s. In 1988 the ‘Country’ model, with larger 20-inch wheels, was introduced and briefly sold. A version with a 16-inch front wheel weighed 12.5 kg, more than the very competitive and compact steel Bromptons that were being mass produced from 1988. After the end of production in 1989, by which time many other cheaper folders were available worldwide, the factory did not close its doors until 1991. Bickerton's son Mark continuing to explore diversification options, including the rebranding and sale of cheaper Dahon folders.

== Technical issues ==
The bike was popular for short distance or multi-mode travel and commuting, and for keeping in a vehicle or boat, although the price was usually above the heavier, steel-framed folding bikes by Raleigh, Peugeot, Puch and other manufacturers. Adjustable handlebars and seat height meant it could accommodate different heights and riding preferences. By the 1980s, however, good folding bikes had taken off and there was much greater competition.

The problems with the Bickerton, particularly in earlier models, were readily apparent to its riders – particularly heavier or taller ones. They had to learn to minimise flex in the long, sweeping handlebars, frame and seat post, requiring no sudden movements or application of too much force while riding. The five clamps, especially the main handlebar clamp, had to be carefully tightened to avoid alarming movement. The small, 298 mm (14-inch) front wheel and straight fork, made of pressed aluminium, did not 'centre' like a conventional bike. Loading up the bag too much was risky, since it attached to the handlebars, which had clamps that had to be tightly fastened and sometimes worked loose. Stress fractures could occur in the seat post, which was very long.

The three-speed and then a five-speed model with a Sturmey Archer hub improved useability, but increased the weight. A 6-speed derailleur model briefly appeared in the final years of production.

== Relaunch ==
The brand was relaunched for the 40th anniversary at the Munich Bike show in Germany, in 2011. Mark Bickerton, son of Harry, is involved with product development, marketing and sales. The new bikes are manufactured by Tern in Taiwan, although some are built in Vietnam. They combine the Bickerton brand with several new designs, aluminium frames, and modern gearing.

== See also ==
- List of bicycle manufacturing companies
