= Harry Bickerton =

British engineer

- Born: 13 June 1921
- Died: 23 March 1994 (aged 72)

Harry Bickerton (13 June 1921–23 March 1994) was a British engineer in the fields of aerospace engineering, engine design (aircraft), and bicycle design.

== Background ==
In 1938, Bickerton left school to take up an apprenticeship at Rolls-Royce in Derby. He was transferred to Glasgow and was seconded to RAE Farnborough to work for Tilly Shilling, where he worked on water methanol injection and exhaust pipe tuning, among other things, for the Rolls-Royce 'Merlin' engine of the Spitfire fighter plane.

After World War II, Bickerton, now a seasoned aircraft engineer, moved on to de Havilland where he was Chief Engineer and worked primarily on internal combustion engines (Gypsy Major) but also became involved in the investigation of the De Havilland Comet after a series of failures. He later re-designed the Gypsy Major engine for Britain's first helicopter (the Skeeter), and headed the development of extreme cold weather equipment for an Antarctic expedition by air. He also filed a patent for a rotary engine design while at De Havilland. Bickerton eventually left the industry in the late 1950s to become a free-lance engineer and inventor.

== The Bickerton Bicycle ==
He became a household name in the UK in the early 1980s after a successful TV campaign advertising the Bickerton (bicycle), a folding bicycle he originally designed in the 1970s and perfected over time. In the mid-1970s, The British Central Office of Information released a film, presenting the Bickerton Portable as a symbol of the British lifestyle while simultaneously extolling its technological advantages ("The smallest bike in the world"). These were its lightness, often below 7.5 kg, and foldability. Harry Bickerton's bicycle design became equally seminal as Alex Moulton's, and eventually inspired Andrew Ritchie to create the Brompton bicycle.

== Other inventions ==
Some of his other projects were a self-adjustable posture bed, which was adopted for use by the National Health Service, and an economical centrifuge (called a Hermatocit) for separating red and white blood cells, designed for use with a car battery in remote locations like Africa. Harry Bickerton's engineering principles, expressed in ten "Performance specification[s] for a new portable human-powered personal transport device" (1971) are still valid today.
