= Small-wheel bicycle =

Type of bicycle

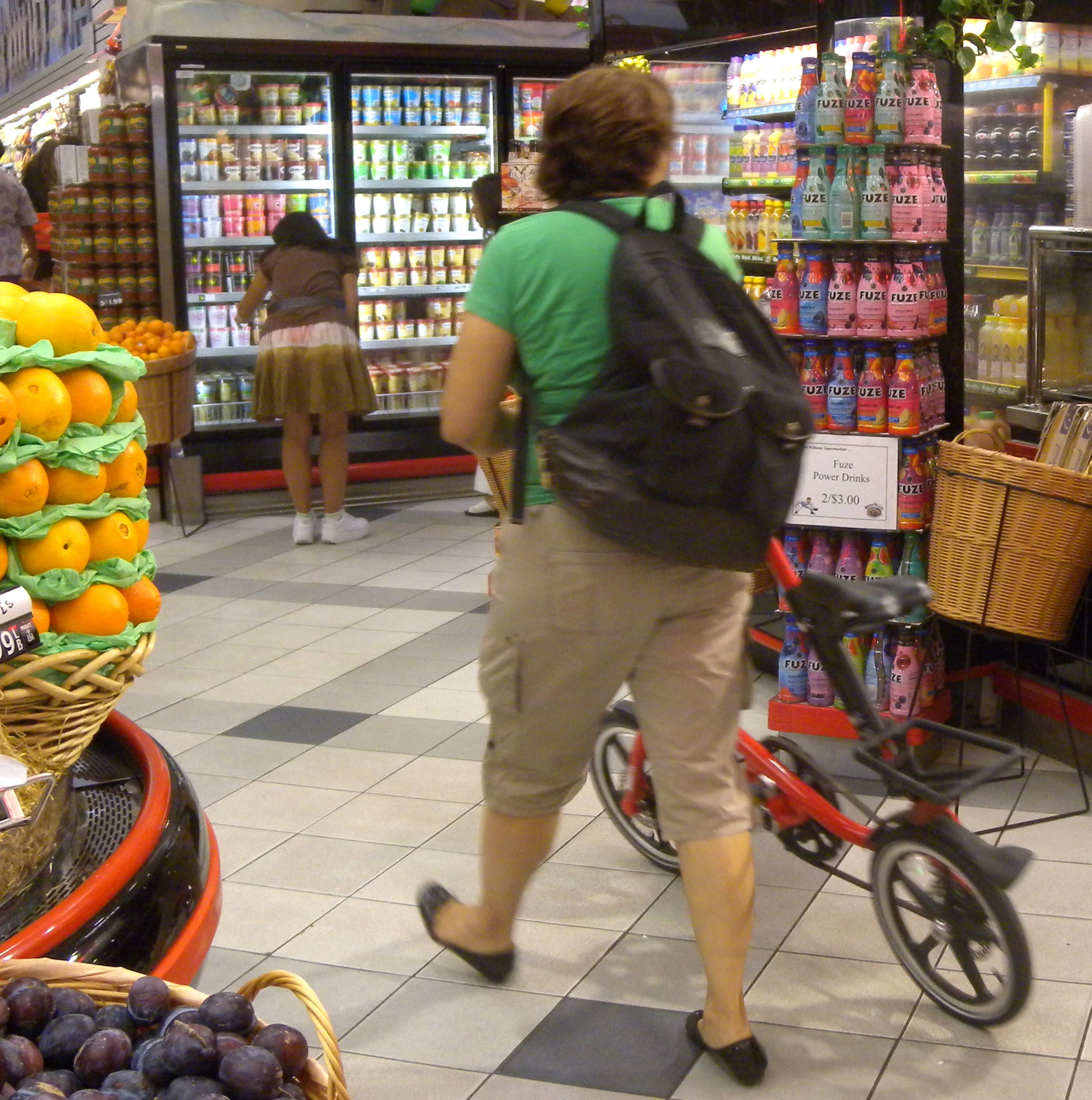
Small wheels may be welcome in indoor locations where large wheels are not

A small-wheel bicycle, sometimes called a mini velo or mini-velo, is an adult bicycle with a reasonable sized frame and relatively small wheels, usually of ETRTO 406 mm (20") or less nominal diameter, which is smaller than the common 622 mm (700c) road bicycle wheel size or 622 mm, 584 mm or 559 mm (29, 27.5 or 26") gravel and mountain bike wheel sizes common on most full-sized adult bikes.

They can be folding or non-folding. While many folding bicycles are small-wheel bicycles, not all small-wheel bicycles can fold. Some small-wheel bicycles neither fold nor separate, such as the Moulton, which comes in both fixed-frame and separable-frame versions.

While BMX bikes also have ETRTO 406 mm ("20 inch") wheels, they are not normally categorised as "small-wheel bikes".

== History ==
An early proponent of small-wheeled adult bicycles was Paul de Vivie, better known by his pen name "Vélocio". His approach was to use a balloon-width tire of about 57 mm (2.25″) on a 500 mm (20″) rim, giving a wheel of approximately 600 mm (24″) in diameter.

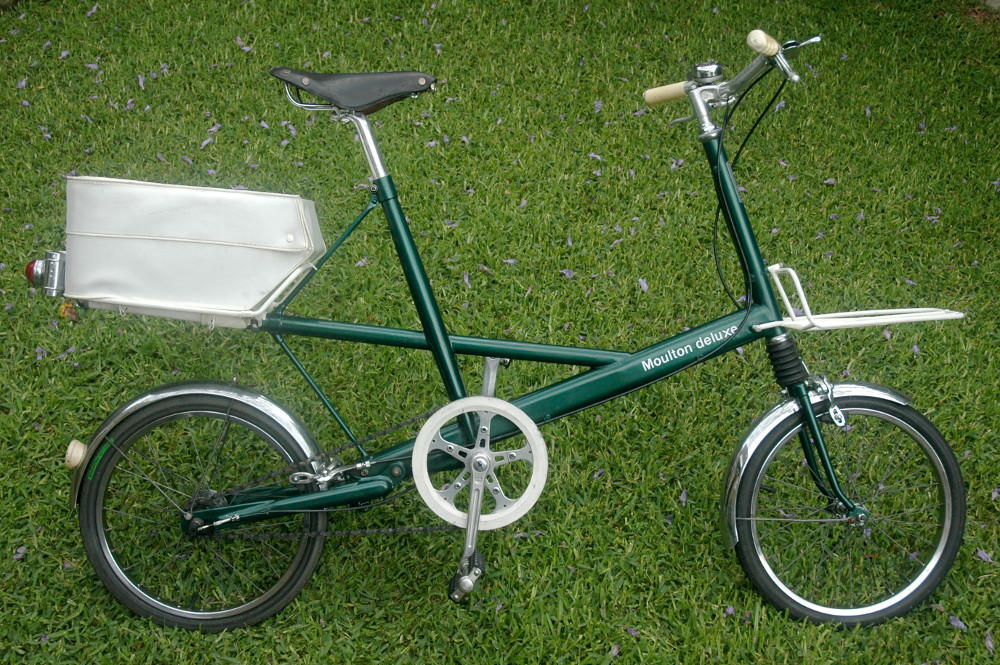
1965 Series 2 Moulton Deluxe

The man credited with being the father of modern small-wheel bicycles is Alex Moulton who pioneered the field with his F-framed Moulton Bicycle in 1962. His original small-wheeled design notably featured full suspension. Raleigh introduced the RSW-16 as a direct competitor, but it lacked the suspension of the Moulton and compensated for this by using very wide 50 mm (2-inch) "balloon" tires. The RSW-16 "Compact" was a folding version. In 1968 Raleigh introduced the Raleigh Twenty, which later went on to become one of Raleigh's biggest sellers. A large number of European manufacturers made U-frame small-wheeled and folding bicycles in the 1970s.

== Advantages and disadvantages ==
Smaller wheels are more maneuverable. For this reason, and in some cases for comic effect, they are used in some clown bicycles. Smaller wheels more faithfully follow the terrain, giving a harsher ride on bumpy roads that are effectively smoothed by larger ones. It may be desirable for bicycles with smaller wheels to also be fitted with some form of suspension to improve riding characteristics. Bicycles with small wheels normally have their gearing adjusted to provide the same effective wheel radius as large ones, so pedalling cadence is not different. Smaller wheels tend to weigh less than larger ones, thus bringing the performance benefits of light wheels.

Small wheels, all else being equal, have slightly higher rolling resistance. On the other hand, they have lower aerodynamic drag due to their smaller area, which is proportional to their radius.

=== Length reduction ===
The overall length reduction of a bicycle using smaller wheels depends on several factors, but mainly the wheel size and whether the wheelbase (distance between the front and rear axles) is reduced. For example, keeping the same axle distance, and going from a 40-622 wheel (approx. 702 mm diameter) to a 30-406 wheel (approx. 466 mm diameter) will result in an overall length reduction of 236 mm. Theoretically that reduction may be doubled if bringing the wheels closer together by shortening the axle distance. However, a shorter wheelbase may result in twitchiness or poor stability.

== See also ==
- Folding bicycle, bicycle made for quick and compact storage, can have small or large wheels
- Portable bicycle, bicycle small and light enough to be easily carried
- Outline of cycling

=== Notable models ===
- List of bicycle manufacturing companies
- Tern (company), manufacturer making many bikes with the BMX 406mm standard.
- Strida, a small-wheel folding bicycle
- Bike Friday, manufacturer of folding, small-wheeled bicycles
- Birdy (bicycle), a small-wheel folding bicycle produced by Riese und Müller
- Brompton Bicycle, a manufacturer of small-wheel folding bicycles
- Moulton Bicycle, a small-wheel bicycle with an unconventional frame design
