= THOMAS =

U.S. legislative database

THOMAS was the first online database of United States Congress legislative information. A project of the Library of Congress, it was launched in January 1995 at the inception of the 104th Congress and retired on July 5, 2016; it has been superseded by Congress.gov.

== Contents ==
The resource was a comprehensive, Internet-accessible source of information on the activities of Congress, including:

- bills and resolutions
  - texts
  - summaries and status
  - voting results, including how individual members voted
- Congressional Record, including the daily digest
- presidential nominations
- treaties

The database was named after Thomas Jefferson, who was the third President of the United States. "THOMAS" was an acronym for "The House [of Representatives] Open Multimedia Access System".

In 1999, Al Gore asked Palm Computing for access to Thomas on a Palm VII. Probably the first legislative mobile app, it was released that year by Palm's partner Workspot in Palo Alto.

The website allowed users to share legislative information via several social networking sites, and there were proposals for an application programming interface.

== Library of Congress Legislative Data Challenge ==
The Library of Congress created the Markup of US Legislation in Akoma Ntoso challenge in July 2013 to create representations of selected US bills using the most recent Akoma Ntoso standard within a couple months for a $5,000 prize, and the Legislative XML Data Mapping challenge in September 2013 to produce a data map for US bill XML and UK bill XML to the most recent Akoma Ntoso schema within a couple months for a $10,000 prize.

- In December 2013, the Library of Congress announced "Jim Mangiafico as the winner of our first legislative data challenge, Markup of US Legislation in Akoma Ntoso and the $5,000 prize".
- In February 2014, Jim Mangiafico and Garrett Schure as the winners of the Library of Congress Second Legislative Data Challenge.
