= Congress.gov =

Online database of the United States Congress

- Available in: English
- Creator: Library of Congress
- Parent: United States Congress
- Website: www.congress.gov

Congress.gov is the online database of United States Congress legislative information. It is a joint project of the Library of Congress, the House, the Senate, and the Government Publishing Office.

Congress.gov was in beta in 2012, and beta testing ended in late 2013. It officially launched on July 5, 2016, superseding THOMAS, the Library of Congress's original online database of congressional material, which had been launched in 1995. The website was created by Library of Congress employees using the Solr open-source search platform.

In fiscal year 2015, the Library of Congress reported 36 million page views for congress.gov.

== Contents ==
The resource is a comprehensive, Internet-accessible source of information on the activities of Congress, including:

- bills and resolutions
  - texts
  - summaries and status
  - voting results, including how individual members voted
- Congressional Record, including the daily digest
- presidential nominations
- treaties
- appropriations
- The Constitution of the United States of America: Analysis and Interpretation
