= Melon Bicycles =

Folding bicycle manufacturer

Melon Bicycle
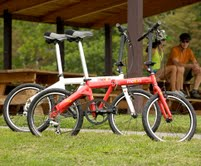
- Industry: Bicycle
- Founded: May 1, 2008; 18 years ago
- Defunct: December 29, 2014; 11 years ago
- Headquarters: Chapel Hill, North Carolina, United States
- Products: Folding bicycle
- Website: www.melonbicycles.com

Melon Bicycles was a folding bicycle manufacturer based in Chapel Hill, North Carolina. Many cyclists refer to the company as Melon Bikes, Melon Bicycles, or simply Melon. Melon Bicycles went out of business in 2014.

Melon worked in collaboration with Chick-fil-A and other companies in programs to improve overall employee well-being and carbon footprint. These programs encouraged employees to ride their bikes to work, thus increasing exercise and cutting down on fuel emissions.

== History ==
Melon was founded in July 2008 by Loran Evans of Rightline Gear and Lakeland Gear in Candler, NC. Evans was inspired to create a bicycle that was more convenient for recreational riders. Motivated by neighbors with bulky bikes, Evans' goal was to design an easy to ride, easy to transport bike, without sacrificing performance.

== Uses ==
Melon bikes were designed to be multifunctional and could be used for fitness, recreation, commuting, or travel. Melon had one model on the market, the Slice. A slack head tube angle and long wheelbase distinguish Melon from some other folding bikes. These features allow for increased performance, however its dimensions may constrain potential riders who are over 6'3". Although the Melon can be used by commuters, its intended function is as an alternative to conventional hybrid, comfort, and fitness bicycles with all of the advantages of a folding bike.

== Folding System ==
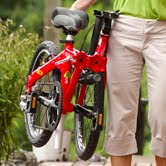
Melon Slice bicycle is portable with dimensions: 34"L x 27"H x 13"W.

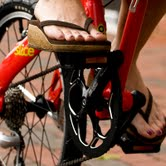
52T Chainring.

The Melon Slice folding system is relatively conventional and straightforward. First, it folds at the pedals and then at the handlebar stem. The bike is then folded in the middle of the top tube so that the two halves come together. With practice, the bike can be folded in about 15 seconds. The folded size of the bike is 34"L x 27"H x 13"W.

== Specifications ==
The Melon Bicycles Slice model's frame and fork is made from 7005 aluminum. The Slice uses a large size 52T chainring and a 12-25T cassette to provide enough of a gear range to conquer all terrains with only 8 speeds. Grip shifters are used for shifting with an easy to read display indicating the current gear chosen. The Slice uses 20" wheels (406mm) in the 1.75" width. The bicycle geometry features a slacker head tube angle than most folding bikes which provides for smooth riding and greater maneuverability. The bike's frame is generally built to accommodate common "industry-standard" components such as brakes and gear systems. The bike will accommodate riders up to 6' 3" in height.

== Strengths and Weaknesses ==
=== Strengths ===
Melon offered multiple accessories. Many municipal bus and train lines require that bikes brought on board be kept transported in a bag. A Folding Bike Carry Bag carries the bike when folded and attaches to the bikes handlebars by Velcro when not in use. In this position, it has a water bottle holder and cell phone pocket that can be accessed by the rider. When used to carry the folded bike, the bag has a set of carry handles, an adjustable shoulder strap, and an outer zippered pocket.

The Melon Slice folding bike can be outfitted with a pair of mud guards to keep rain and dirt from soiling the riders clothing. The mud guards bolt onto the front fork and the rear reflector frame member.

=== Weaknesses ===
As previously mentioned, the Slice model has relatively strict height and weight limits. It is also considered expensive by some. Finally, the Slice's color options are currently restricted to only red or white.
