= Burley Design =

American company

Burley Design, LLC
- Headquarters: Eugene, Oregon, United States
- Owner: Michael Coughlin
- Website: burley.com

Burley Design (previously Burley Design Cooperative) LLC is a company in Eugene, Oregon, United States that has produced outdoor family products since 1978. Its blue and yellow children's bicycle trailers were among the first on sale, in the early 1980s. In the past, Burley also made bicycles, tandem bicycles, recumbent bicycles, and rain gear.

Burley was run as a worker-owned cooperative from its inception until June 2006, when the company converted to a private corporation. In September 2006, Burley Design was purchased by Eugene businessman Michael Coughlin. Production of bicycles and apparel ended that month, and the company turned to child, adventure, and pet trailers.

== Trailers ==
- d'lite ST...Smart Transport New for 2009
- Solo ST...Smart Transport New for 2009
- d'lite
- Solo
- Cub
- Encore
- Honey Bee
- Bee
- Nomad
- Flatbed
- Tail Wagon
- Rover
- Travoy (Urban Trailer System) New for 2010
- Bark Ranger (L&XL) New for 2022

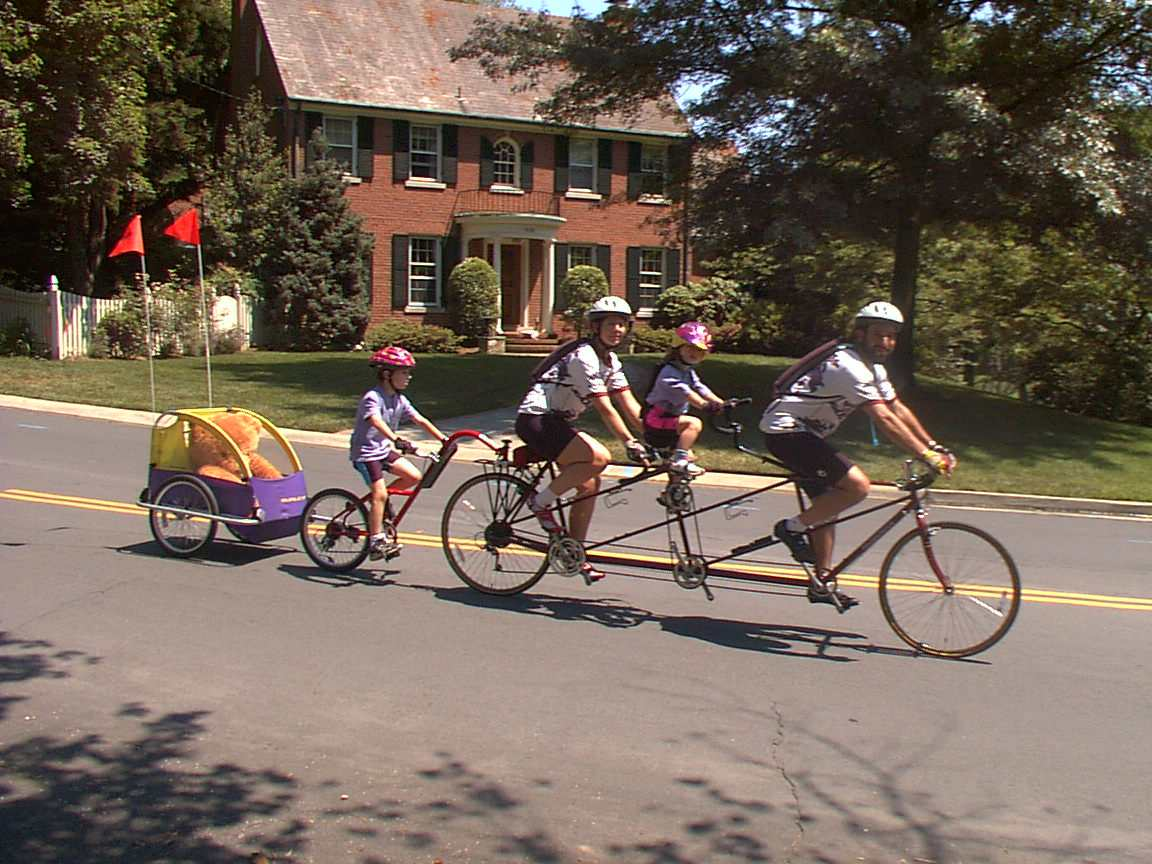
Burley Piccolo, behind a triple tandem

== Trailercycles ==
- Piccolo (attaches to Moose Rack, not seatpost)
- Kazoo (similar to Piccolo, but a single speed)

== Upright bicycles (no longer in production) ==
- Hudson
- Vagabond
- McKenzie
- Sahalie
- Wolf Creek
- Fox Hollow
- Pine Grove
- Harlow
- Runabout

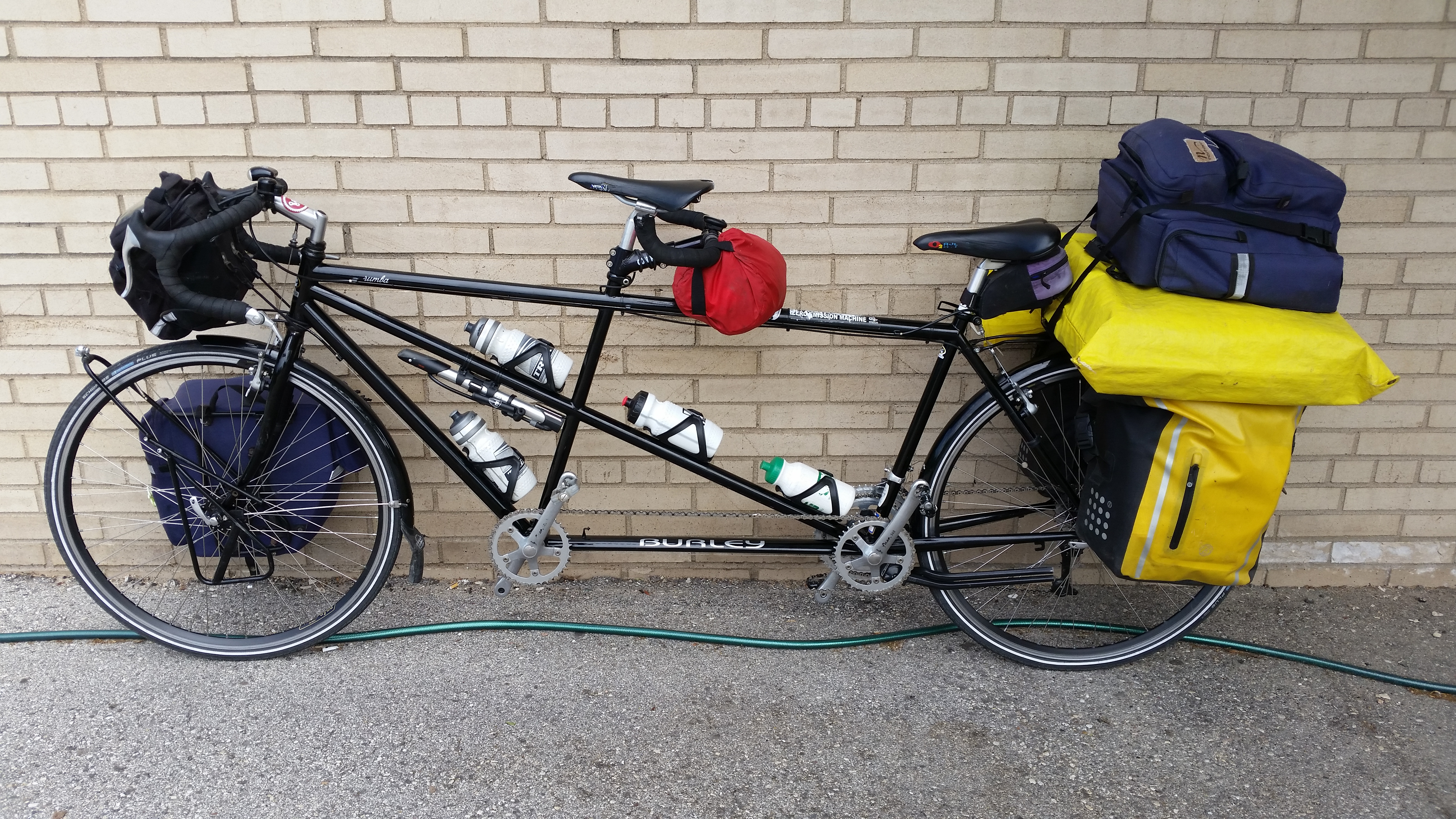
Burley Rumba tandem bicycle loaded for touring

== Tandem bicycles (no longer in production) ==
- Duet
- Rock 'N Roll
- Rumba
- Paso Doble
- Bossa Nova
- Tamberello
- Zydeco
- Samba, mountain bike
- Bongo, mountain bike

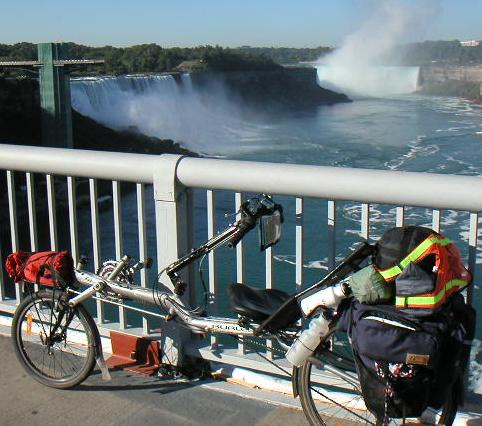
Burley Canto recumbent bicycle loaded for touring

== Recumbent bicycles (no longer in production) ==
- Jett Creek - LWB
- Koosah - LWB
- Spider - LWB
- Nasoke - LWB
- Hepcat - SWB
- Django - SWB
- Canto - LWB
- Sand Point - LWB

== See also ==
- Bike Friday
- List of bicycle part manufacturing companies
- List of companies based in Oregon
