= KHS Bicycles =

Bicycle manufacturer

- Type: Private
- Industry: Bicycles
- Founded: 1974
- Headquarters: Taoyuan, Taiwan
- Key people: Jack Cheng-Kuan Hsieh, Chairman
- Products: Bicycles and related components
- Website: www.khsbicycles.com (U.S.)

KHS Bicycles is a bicycle manufacturer founded in 1974 with main operations in the United States and Taiwan. Its bicycles are distributed in over 30 countries. Although KHS' main focus has been in mountain bikes, it has offerings in road bikes, folding bikes, tandem bikes, cruiser bikes (under the Manhattan brand name), single speed bikes and BMX bikes (under the FreeAgent brand name). Some of its products have been favorably reviewed. On May 28, 2026, KHS announced its closure along with its subsidiary brands in the USA.

== Overview ==
KHS Bicycles, Inc. headquarters

KHS Bicycles, Inc. of Los Angeles, California, is the designer and U.S. distributor of KHS Bicycles, Manhattan Cruisers and Free Agent BMX Bicycles. KHS stands for Knowledge, Health, and Strength. Founded in 1974 by Wen Hsieh, the KHS bicycle brand is a part of the KHS Co. Ltd., and UEC (United Engineering Corporation) which manufactures bicycles, motorcycles and Yamaha musical instruments in wholly owned factories located in Taiwan. KHS, Inc. was founded and is located in Southern California. As of 2020 KHS makes more than 90 models of KHS bicycles, 24 models of Free Agent BMX Bicycles, and 25 models of Manhattan Cruisers. KHS employs 120 associates in Taiwan, as well as 55 associates in the USA. KHS Inc. is also a major distributor for various parts and accessories manufacturers in the USA.

== History ==
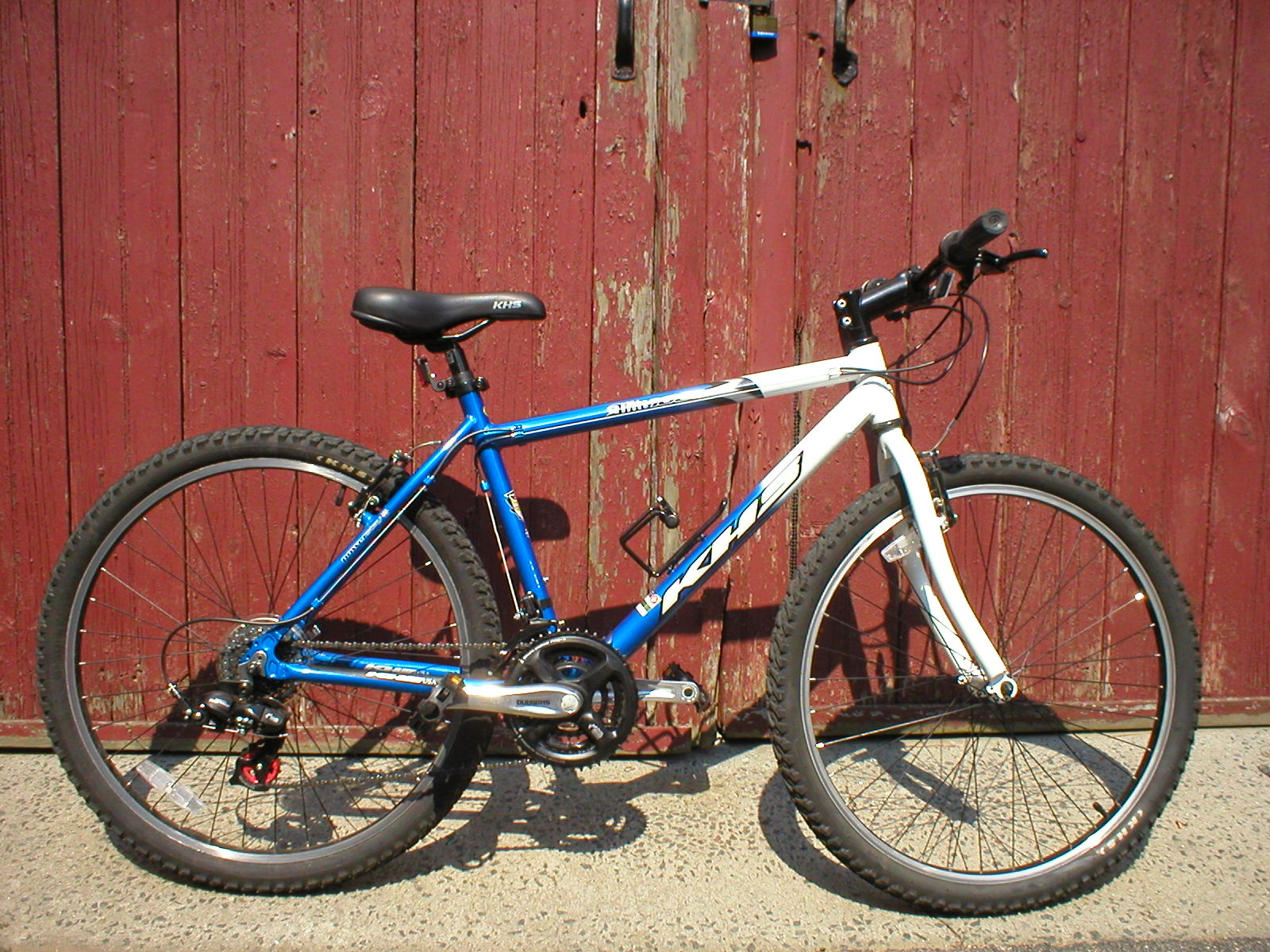
A KHS mountain bike

KHS Co. Ltd. Was founded in 1953 as part of the KHS Group, privately held by the Hsieh Family. The initial product produced by KHS was motorcycles under Yamaha license. In 1974, the KHS bicycle division was established with technical cooperation from Sukosha of Japan. In 1987, the KHS Co. and Yamaha of Japan established a joint venture operation in order to increase production capacity and explore new markets around the world. Consequently, motorcycles are now exported to Greece, Portugal, Italy, India and Japan. United Engineering Corp. was established in 1988. Formerly known as the KHS Bicycle Factory, United Engineering Corp. now manufactures KHS bicycles, as well as bicycles for other companies throughout the world.

== Patents, awards and accomplishments ==
- KHS was the first Taiwan-made road bike to enter U.S. market with Reynolds 531 tubing. Bicycling Magazine tested this model in 1979 and rated it as good as a similar, French-made Motobecane model.
- KHS awarded the “Sears Partner in Progress” award in 1986
- KHS remains the only brand to have a finalist in Mountain Biking Magazine's “Bike of the Year” award every year since the inception of the award in 1992
- KHS Comp was awarded the “Bike of the Year” award by Mountain Biking Magazine in 1994 and 2001
- Bicycling Magazine awards the 1997 KHS Fleetwood its “Editor’s Choice Award” for best bike at the 1996 Interbike International Bicycle show
- In March 1998, the KHS FXT Sport is rated “Best Value” full suspension bike under $1000 by Mountain Bike Action Magazine
- KHS introduces suspension seatposts and semi-slick tires on its 1998 mountain bike line, a full year ahead of most other brands
- KHS is the first to introduce popularly priced Soft Tails to the market during 1999 giving Hard Tail and Full Suspension buyers a new alternative that incorporates the best of both designs
- Preferred Bicycle & Parts Distributor in the U.S. voted by U.S. bicycle dealers in 2002
- Consumers Digest Best Buy for the Urban Xpress bicycle in the July 2006 issue
- Bicycling Magazine’s “Editor’s Choice” for the 2006 XC604
- KHS introduces one of the first major production 650b wheel size mountain bike models in 2010
- Delta Linear, U.S. patent 5,842,712 issued on 12/1/98. KHS developed its Delta Linear Downtube in order to decrease weight and to increase strength, rigidity and long term durability of its frames. The teardrop-shaped Delta Linear tube is drawn to a round shape at the bottom bracket in order to reduce flex under aggressive pedaling and ovalized on the vertical axis at the headtube in order to increase frame rigidity by over 30% over conventional round tubes.
- Adjustable seat tower, patent pending. Found on the KHS LT3 frame, this seat tube Tower can be rotated via a cam to change the effective seat tube angle of the frame by four degrees. Ideal for downhill riders competing or riding in carried terrain.
- Brake Booster leverage converter, U.S. patent 5,660,082 issued August 26, 1997. This unique converter allows use of road bike brake levers with linear pull, “V” brakes. Found on all KHS road tandems.

== KHS & FREE AGENT Racing ==
World Champion Melissa Buhl

KHS Bicycles and its BMX brand Free Agent have long histories of racing victories, including numerous national and world championships. Here is a brief list of some of the brands' top racing victories, sponsored riders and sponsored teams.

Sponsored racers:

- John Howard: World speed record holder @ 152 m.p.h., 24-hour distance record holder @ 539 miles, Ironman Triathlon winner, 3-time Olympian, 13-time U.S. National cycling champion, Master dual road & MTB XC champion in U.S.A.
- Logan Binggeli: U.S.A. National Champion DH Pro
- Quinton Spaulding: U.S.A. National Champion DH Pro
- Kevin Aiello: U.S.A. National Champion DH Pro
- Steven Walton: U.S.A. National DH Pro
- Nikolas Nestoroff: U.S.A. National DH Pro
- Dave Cullinan: World Champion Downhill and Dual Slalom medal winner
- Cindy Whitehead: U.S. National Cyclocross champion
- “Insane Wayne” Croasdale: Mammoth Mountain kamikaze down hill champion
- Cheri Elliot: U.S. National Cyclocross and Dual Slalom Champion
- Andrew Shandro: Canadian Downhill champion
- Katrina Miller: UCI Dual Slalom champion, Australian Downhill champion
- Melissa Buhl: UCI World Downhill champion, U.S. National 4X champion
- Maris Strombergs: 2008 Olympic Gold Medal, 2008 UCI World Champion, 2012 Olympic Gold Medal
- Kyle Bennett: 3-time UCI World Champion, Multi-time ABA and NBL National Champion
- Dale Holmes: 2-time UCI World Champion, Multi-time British National Champion
- Connor Fields: 2009 NBL National Champion, ABA National Age Group Champion
- Cristian Becerine: 9-time Argentine National Champion
- Romero Marino: 4-time Junior World Champion
- Mariana Pajon : 2009 UCI World Champion, Multi-time Colombian National Champion
- Nicole Callisto: 2005 Junior World Champion
- Tom Haugen: X-Games Pro
- Heath Pinter: X-Games Pro

Sponsored teams:

- KHS Factory Racing is now KHS Pro MTB
- Cash Call Cycling
- BCR/Pizza Hut/KHS – Costa Rica
- University of California, Berkeley
- University of Southern California
- University of Arizona
- University of California, San Diego
- South Bay Wheelman Club
- Guacamole Intern Seller Bicycle racing team
- San Francisco Cycle Couriers
- Highway.net cycling team
