= Bike Friday =

American folding bicycle company

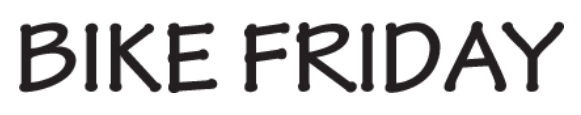
- Type: Private
- Industry: Bicycles
- Founded: 1992; 34 years ago
- Headquarters: Eugene, Oregon, USA
- Key people: Hanna Scholz, President
- Products: Bicycles and related components
- Number of employees: 22
- Parent: Green Gear Cycling
- Website: www.bikefriday.com

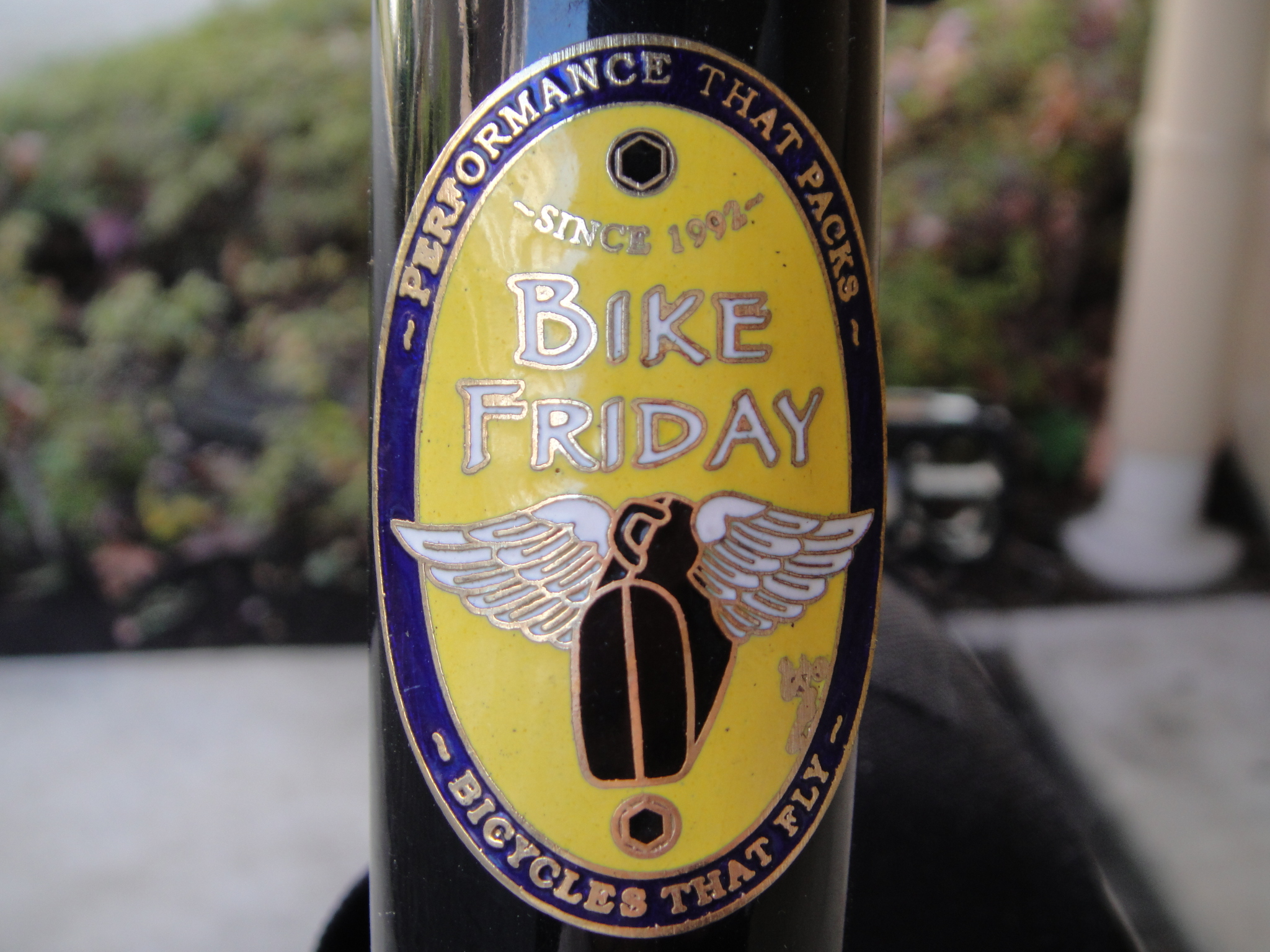
Bike Friday head badge

Bike Friday is a manufacturer of folding, small-wheeled bicycles that is headquartered in Eugene, Oregon, United States. The company was founded in 1992 by brothers Alan Scholz and Hanz Scholz. By 2018, it employed 22 people and manufactured frames in Eugene. Alan Scholz also founded Burley Design Cooperative in 1978.

Bike Friday was the only manufacturer of folding bicycles in the United States by 2018, and many of the bikes they made were custom. Some of the models produced include tandems, one that can fold into a backpack, commuter bicycles, belt-drive bicycles, cargo bicycles, a mountain bike, recumbents, and even a folding, recumbent, tandem.
