= Greg Bryant (computer scientist) =

American computer scientist

- Occupations: computer scientist and community organizer
- Known for: Founder of Workspot

Greg Bryant is a computer scientist and community organizer, best known as the founder of Workspot in downtown Palo Alto during the dotcom boom, and editor of RAIN Magazine since 1989. He also acted as a liaison between the computer industry and Christopher Alexander on many projects.

== Career ==
In computing, he was an early promoter of virtual machines, which led to work promoting UNIX and software tools at Intel headquarters during the 80386 project, and the creation of several production domain-specific languages. He built languages and authoring tools for the first consumer in-car navigation systems, and the first mobile traffic app, and built the first fullscreen mobile apps for Google, and for eBay . He introduced the idea of 'unfolding programming sequences', and the category of 'operational grammars' with the programming language 'grogix'. He writes about foundation problems in computing philosophy, and presents on the application of software to urban issues.

His community organizing closely follows his research and writing for RAIN Magazine. He co-founded two special-purpose community centers, which were also local business incubators: the Center for Appropriate Transport and the Tango Center in Eugene, Oregon. Defending the Tango Center led to a ballot measure that temporarily defunded Urban Renewal in downtown Eugene, Measure 20–134 in November 2007, which may be the central factor in its rejuvenation.
