= Center for Appropriate Transport =

Non-profit community centre in Eugene, Oregon, USA

The Center for Appropriate Transport (CAT) was a non-profit community center dedicated to bicycles and alternative transport located in Eugene, Oregon, United States.

The Center operated from 1992 to 2020. One of CAT's primary activities was holding publicly funded educational workshops for youth ages 12 to 21. Within the 8,000-square-foot (740 m^{2}) facility there was a public bicycle repair workspace and a bike machine-shop for the design and manufacture of special-purpose bikes, particularly cargo bikes and recumbents. There was also a bike museum on site, a bike rack-building workshop, and a sewing facility. CAT formerly held the offices of Oregon Cycling magazine, which ceased publishing in 2009. Pedaler's Express, a pioneering workbike-based delivery service initiated at CAT; the former CAT building re-christened "NEST" is still home to Pedaler's Express.

In 2021, the facility and programs were bought by the non-profit Better Eugene-Springfield Transportation (BEST). As of May 17, 2021: The Center for Appropriate Transport in Eugene, Oregon is closed. Their website is now shut down.

== History ==
CAT was founded in 1992.

To create the center, Jan VanderTuin gathered the founding core group, which included bicycle retailer and activist Kurt Jensen, writer and racer Jason Moore, environmental activist Tom Bowerman, and Rain Magazine editors Greg Bryant and Danielle Janes. Bryant was instrumental in bringing Oregon Cycling into CAT, and obtaining non-profit status. CAT opened on November 20, 1992.

Within a few years CAT and Rain Magazine were no longer partners, and by 1995 the emphasis turned to youth education when CAT began contracting with local school districts to work with youth in need of a hands-on education. CAT was an alternative education program registered with the Oregon Department of Education and as such was one of the few publicly funded bicycle schools in the United States.

== See also ==
- Network Charter School
