= Workspot =

Former Linux web service

Workspot was the first Linux desktop Web Service, i.e. it provided open source personal computing without computer ownership. Founded by Greg Bryant, Gal Cohen, Kathy Giori, Curt Brune, Benny Soetarman, Bruce Robertson, and Asao Kamei, in 1999, it was the first application service to make use of Virtual Network Computing. Workspot also hosted a free Linux Desktop demo using VNC: 'one-click to Linux' It eventually began to charge for a remote, web-accessible, persistent desktop, and several desktop collaboration features. Workspot won Linux Journal's Best Web Application award for 2000. Badly hit by the dotcom crash, it ceased activity by 2005.

Workspot was based in downtown Palo Alto, California during the dotcom boom, and funded its free desktop service through wireless contracting: they may have been the first mobile web app shop, involved in creating the first mobile apps for Google, eBay, Barnes & Noble, Amazon, Metro Traffic etc., as well as client-server software for OmniSky and Palm.

Workspot released AES encryption patches for VNC.

Workspot's domain and name was sold in 2013 to Workspot, Inc.
