= Jan Vander Tuin =

Jan Vander Tuin is a founder of the Community Supported Agriculture (CSA) movement. He is also a cycling activist and bicycle designer, and in 1992 started the Center for Appropriate Transport in Eugene, Oregon.

Vander Tuin learned about co-operative biodynamic farming in Switzerland, and is credited with bringing his Swiss experience to the revival of local agriculture in the US. Vander Tuin settled in Eugene, Oregon in 1990. He started building workbikes under the name Human Powered Machines. Under the umbrella of the Center for Appropriate Transport, he nurtured a bicycle repair school, the Network Charter School, and the first car-sharing co-op in the US.
