= Rain Magazine =

RAIN Magazine
- Editor: Steve Johnson, Lane deMoll, Tom Bender, Greg Bryant, F. Lansing Scott, Marcia Johnson, Lee Johnson, Phil Conti, Del Greenfield, Tad Mutersbaugh, Mark Roseland, Debra Whitelaw, Karen Struening, Carlotta Collette, Steve Rudman, Scott Androes, Mimi Maduro, Steven Ames, Linda Sawaya, John Ferrell, Rob Baird, Tanya Kucak, Katherine Sadler, Jeff Strang, Nancy Cosper, Laura Stuchinsky, Stephen Schneider, Danielle Janes
- Categories: Environmental
- Frequency: monthly/quarterly/continuous (varied)
- First issue: October 1974
- Country: United States of America
- Language: English
- Website: https://www.rainmagazine.com
- ISSN: 0739-621X

RAIN is an appropriate technology, environmental, and community-organizing journal that began in Portland, Oregon in 1974.
