= Raleigh Twenty =

Small-wheeled bicycle

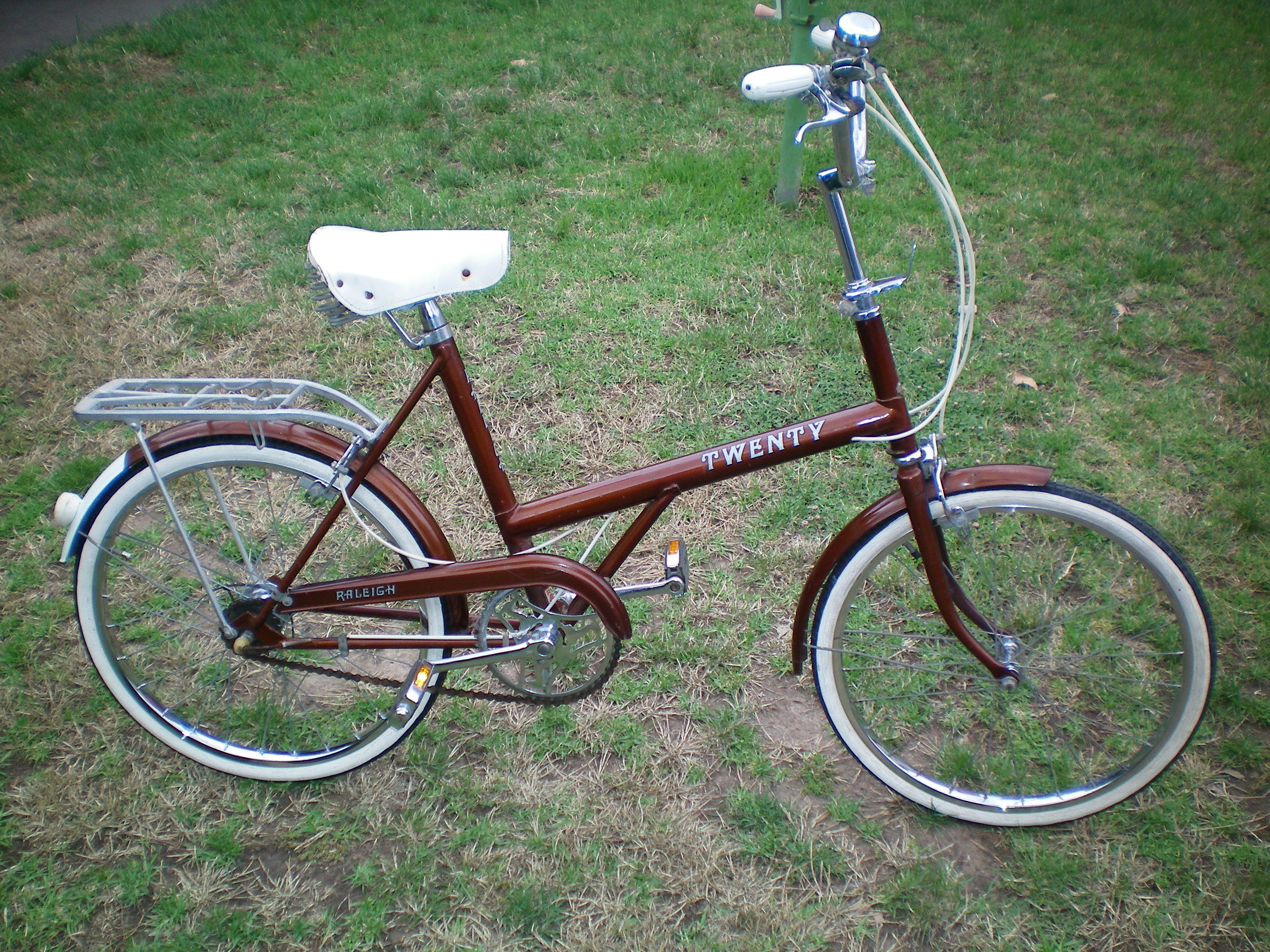
1975, non-folding, three-speed Raleigh Twenty

The Raleigh "Twenty" or "Shopper" was a small-wheeled bicycle made by Raleigh from 1968 until the early 1980s. The Twenty was made in both folding and "fixed" versions.

The Twenty was a companion model to the RSW 16. The Twenty was more successful and it remained in production long after the RSW was discontinued.

== Background ==
The Twenty was not aggressively marketed when it was first released in 1968, but it was a much better bicycle than the RSW. The Twenty's larger wheels made it smoother and it had less rolling resistance. By 1970 the RSW was selling rather poorly so Raleigh decided to market the "Twenty" more heavily. In 1971 a folding version was released under an old Moulton name the "Stowaway".

In 1974 the RSW was discontinued and the "Twenty" became Raleigh's main small-wheeled bicycle in production. In 1975, 140,000 were manufactured in the UK alone. It was Raleigh's biggest seller in 1977, though sales tapered off after this. Its final year of production was not until 1984, giving the Raleigh Twenty a 16-year production lifespan.

== Technical information ==
Sturmey-Archer AW 3-speed hub

The Raleigh "Twenty" was originally fitted with 20" × 1-3/8" wheels and tyres (ISO 35-451), but most export versions were sold with 20" × 1.75" wheels and tyres (ISO 47-406).

Many were sold as either single speed with coaster brake or fitted with a Sturmey-Archer AW three-speed hub. The New-Zealand-manufactured version was offered with a duomatic two-speed hub, which shifted gears by kicking back the pedals and also had a built-in coaster brake.

== Variations and derivatives ==
A number of major variations exist, including different styles of handlebars, different hubs and different carry rack arrangements. Most of these were just the same basic "Twenty" marketed (for example) as the "Shopper" with a front basket to increase carrying capacity.

=== Raleigh Eighteen ===
This was essentially a Raleigh Twenty reduced in size by 10%. It differed from the larger model in that it dispensed with the bracing struts at the bottom bracket. The Eighteen was introduced in 1972 and aimed at children and shorter adults.

=== Raleigh Commando ===
This was a Raleigh Eighteen with a chopper-style seat. It was aimed at the youth market.

=== Raleigh Twenty Two ===
This was essentially a Raleigh Twenty increased in size by 10%. It also had no bracing struts at the bottom bracket.

== Marketing ==
Raleigh owned a number of former competitors and the "Twenty" was sold under many of these names, including Triumph, Sun, Hercules, New Hudson, and BSA. The "Twenty" was also manufactured in New Zealand due to local trade laws requiring 40% local content. The New Zealand-manufactured version is most readily identified by the lack of the extra bracing struts at the bottom bracket found on the UK and Canadian-built versions. An early-1980s advertisement offers a two-speed automatic (kick-back) hub, not found on other versions of the Raleigh "Twenty".

The style was later revived in an updated form as part of a short-lived collaboration with the fashion label Red or Dead.

== Timeline ==
- 1968 – First Introduced
- 1969 – Folding Version introduced in Canada (conjectured)
- 1971 – Folding Version introduced in UK and export markets
- 1974 – RSW 16 discontinued – focus shifted to "Twenty"
- 1975 – 140,000 "Twentys" manufactured in UK
- 1977 – The "Twenty" is Raleigh's most popular bicycle
- 1984 – Discontinued
