= Folding bicycle =

Bicycle designed to fold into a compact form

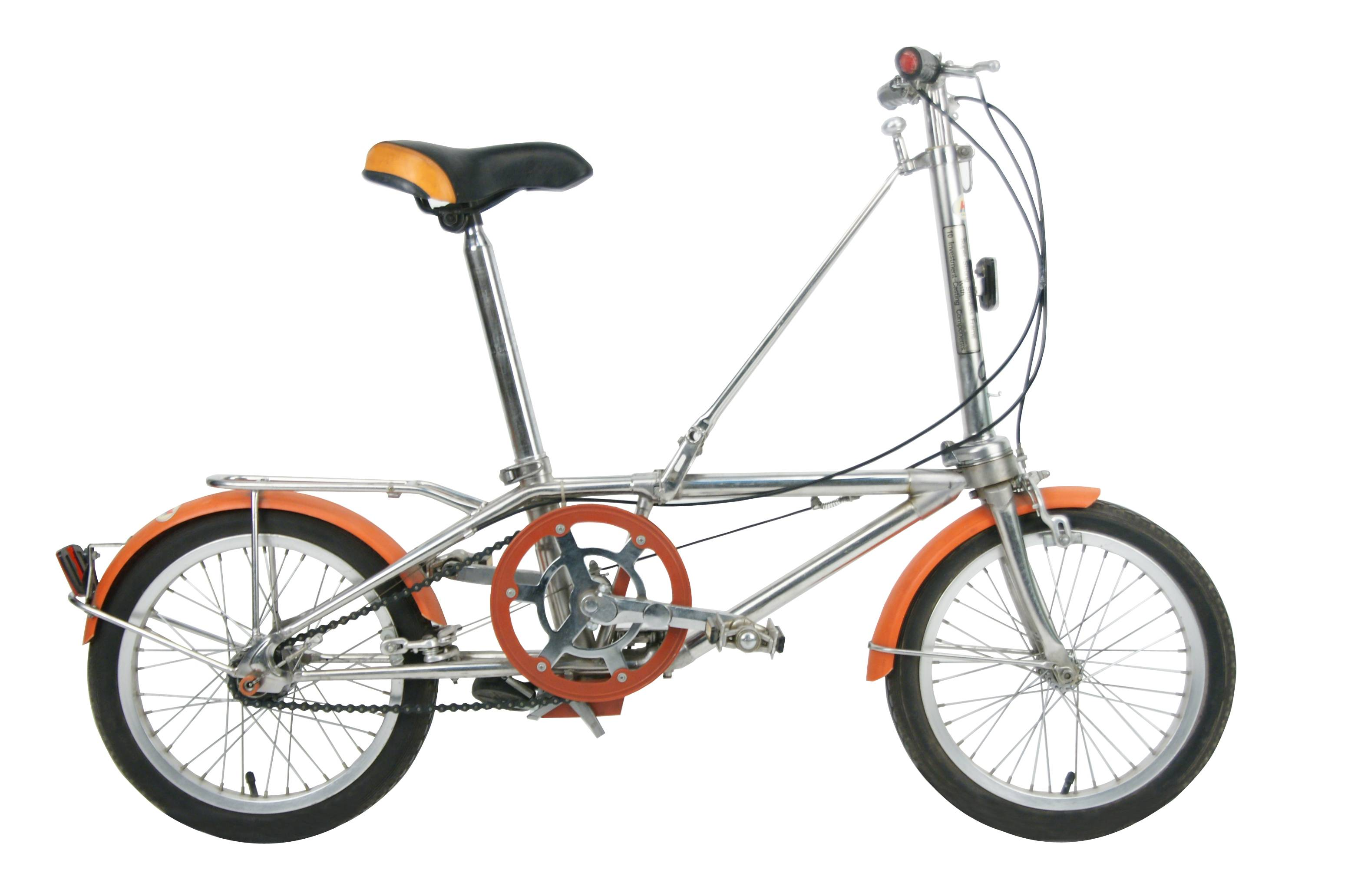
1982 Hon Convertible folding bicycle

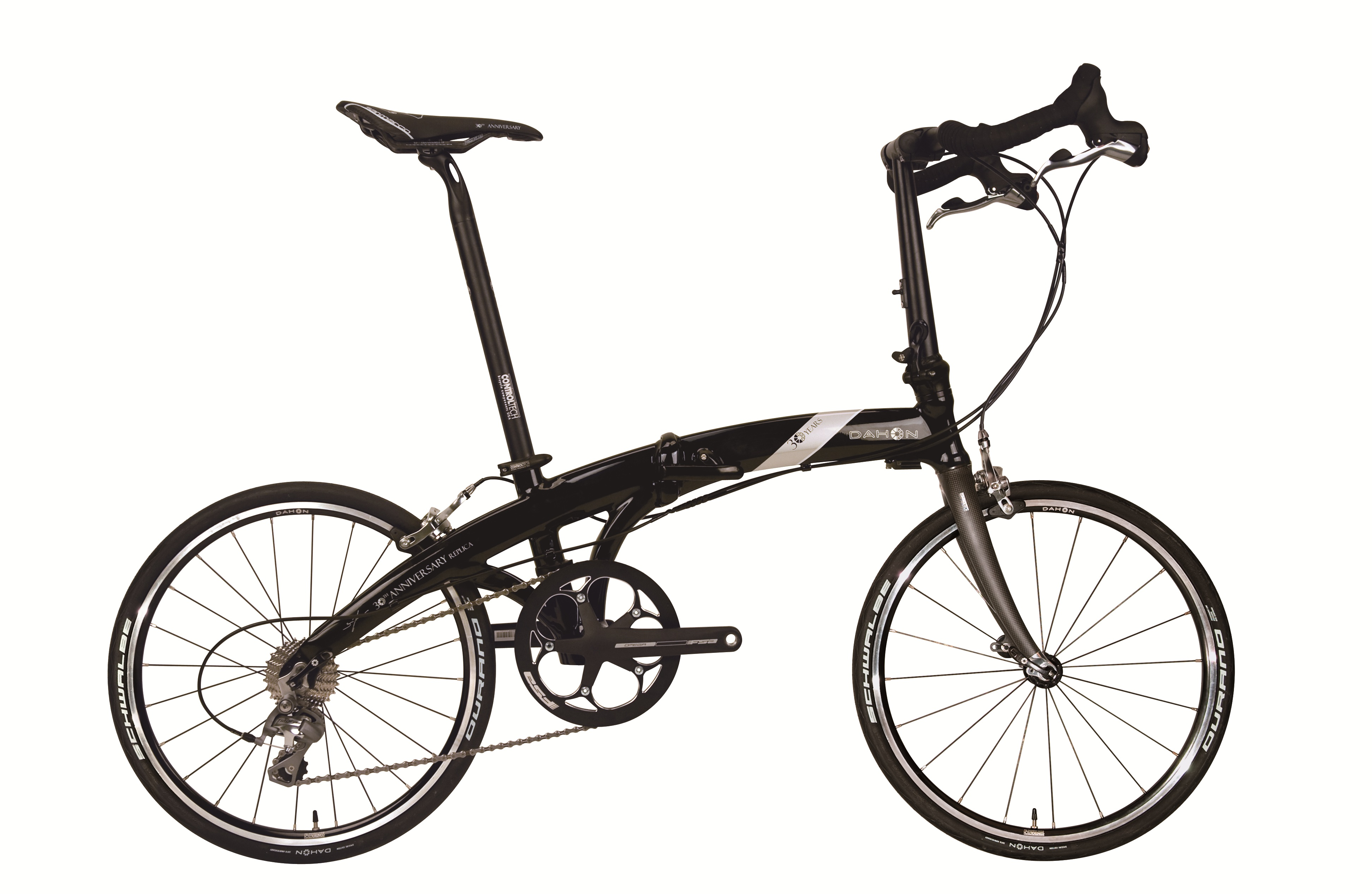
30th Anniversary Special Edition Dahon folding bike (2012)

A folding bicycle is designed to be compacted into a smaller, more manageable size or shape, making it easier to store or carry. When folded, the bikes can be more easily carried into buildings, on public transportation (facilitating mixed-mode commuting and bicycle commuting), and more easily stored in compact living quarters or aboard a car, boat or plane. Foldable bikes are also often used as a travel bicycle (not to be confused touring bicycle) as an alternative to take-apart bikes.

Some folding bicycles are also electrically powered. A folding bicycle or electric-assisted folding bicycle is legally defined as a bicycle (or electric bicycle, e-bikes, respectively) in all nations, having to comply with all relevant safety standards to be road worthy.

Folding mechanisms vary, with each offering a distinct combination of folding speed, folding ease, compactness, ride, weight, durability, complexity and price. Distinguished by the complexities of their folding mechanism, more demanding structural requirements, greater number of parts, and more specialized market appeal, folding bikes may be more expensive than comparable non-folding models. The choice of model, apart from cost considerations, is a matter of resolving the various practical requirements: a quick, easy fold, a compact folded size, or a faster but less compact model.

There are also bicycles that provide similar advantages by separating into pieces rather than folding. Columbia Bicycles capitalized on the military use of their bicycles, and the folding Compax model was named the ‘Compax Paratrooper’ for the civilian market and brought to the market in 1947.

== History ==
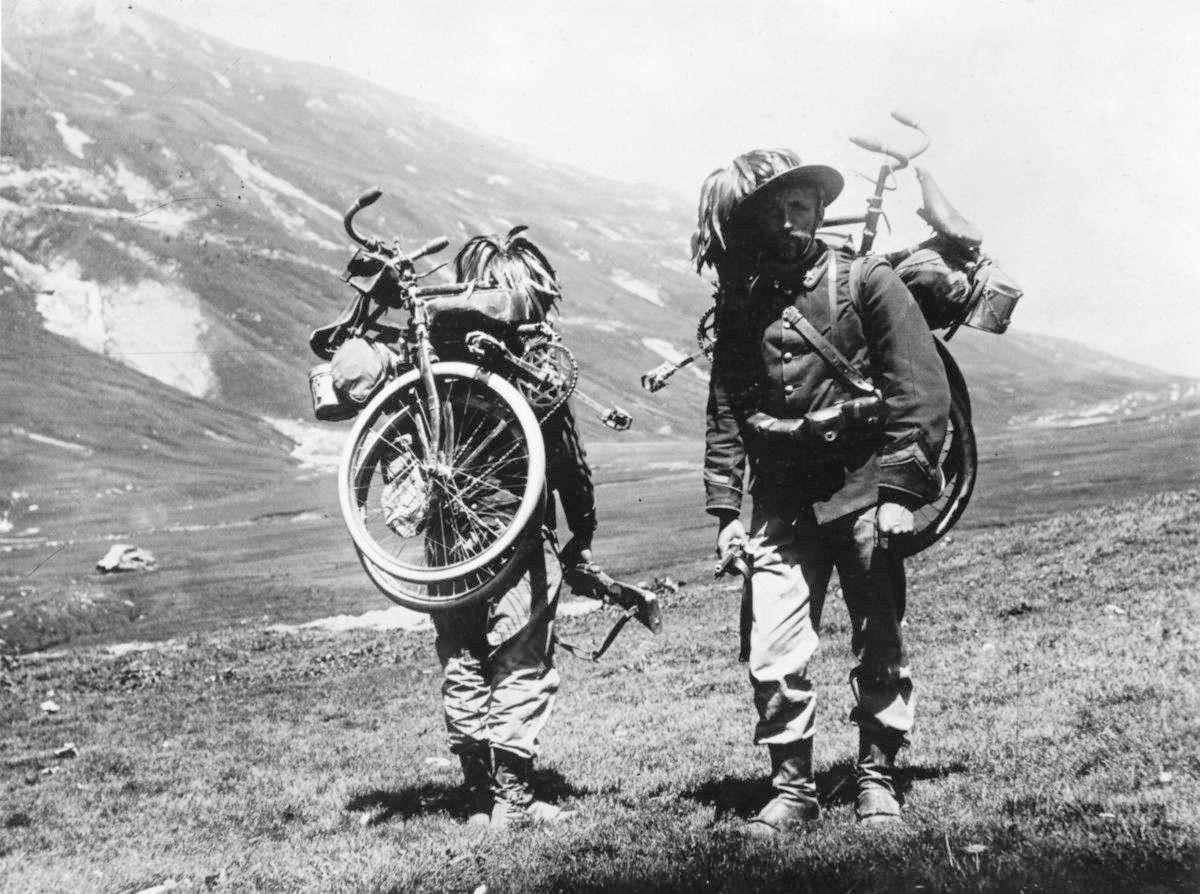
Italian Bersaglieri during World War I with folding bicycles strapped to their backs (1917)

1964 newsreel featuring a Gazelle "Kwikstep", a full-size folding bicycle.

The origins of the first folding bicycle can be traced back to William Grout who is regarded as the inventor of the first folding bicycle in 1878. The first folding bicycle patent was filed by an American inventor, Emmit G. Latta on September 16, 1887. Military interest in bicycles arose in the 1890s, and the French army and others deployed folding bikes for bicycle infantry use. In 1900, Mikael Pedersen developed for the British army a folding version of his Pedersen bicycle that weighed 6.8 kg (15 lb) and had 610 mm (24 in) wheels. It included a rifle rack and was used in the Second Boer War.

In 1941, during the Second World War, the British War Office called for a machine that weighed less than 10 kg (23 lb) (this was not achieved – the final weight was about 15 kg (32 lb)) and would withstand being dropped by parachute. In response, the Birmingham Small Arms Company (BSA) developed a folding bicycle small enough to be taken in small gliders or on parachute jumps from aircraft.

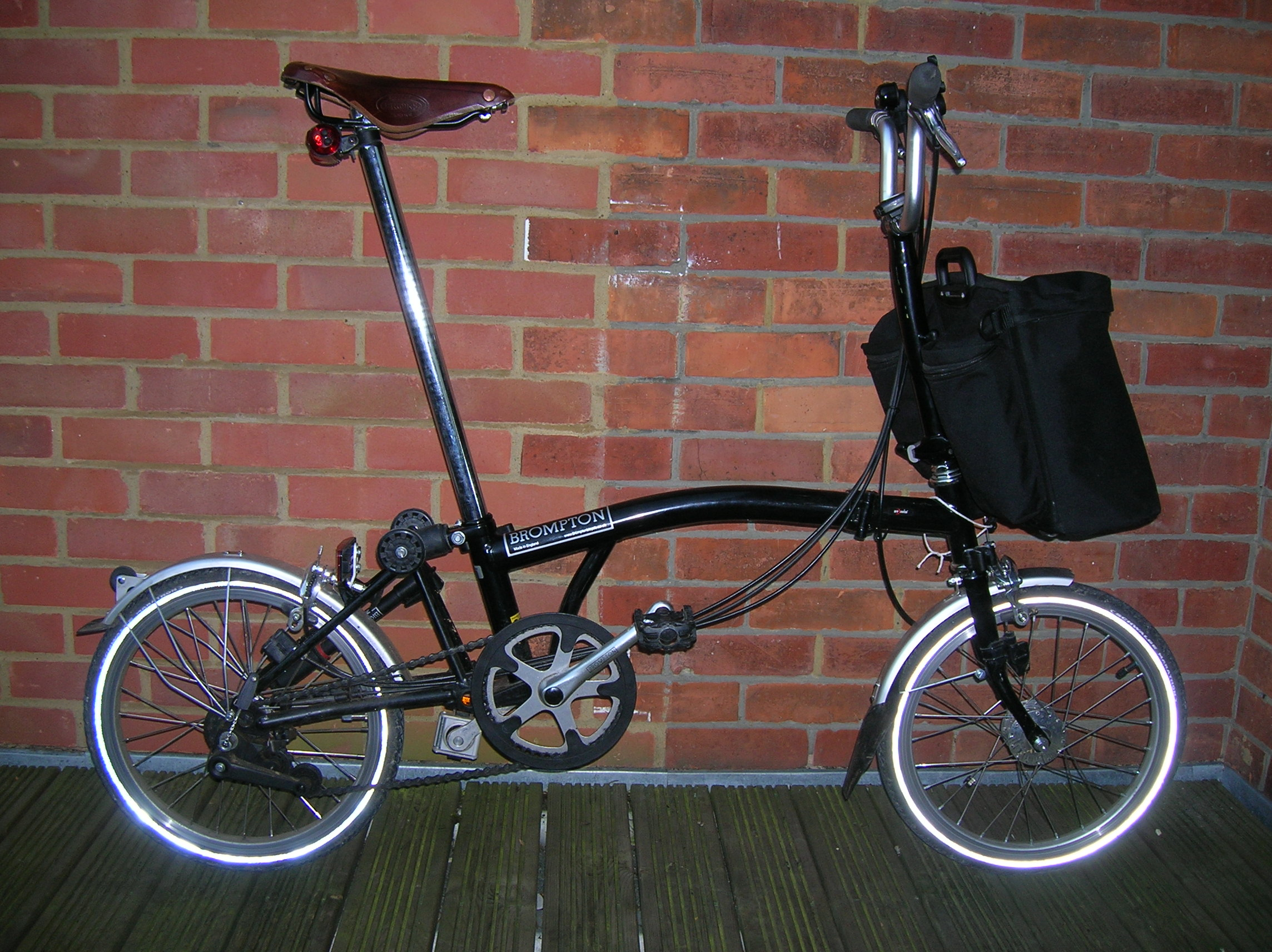
Brompton

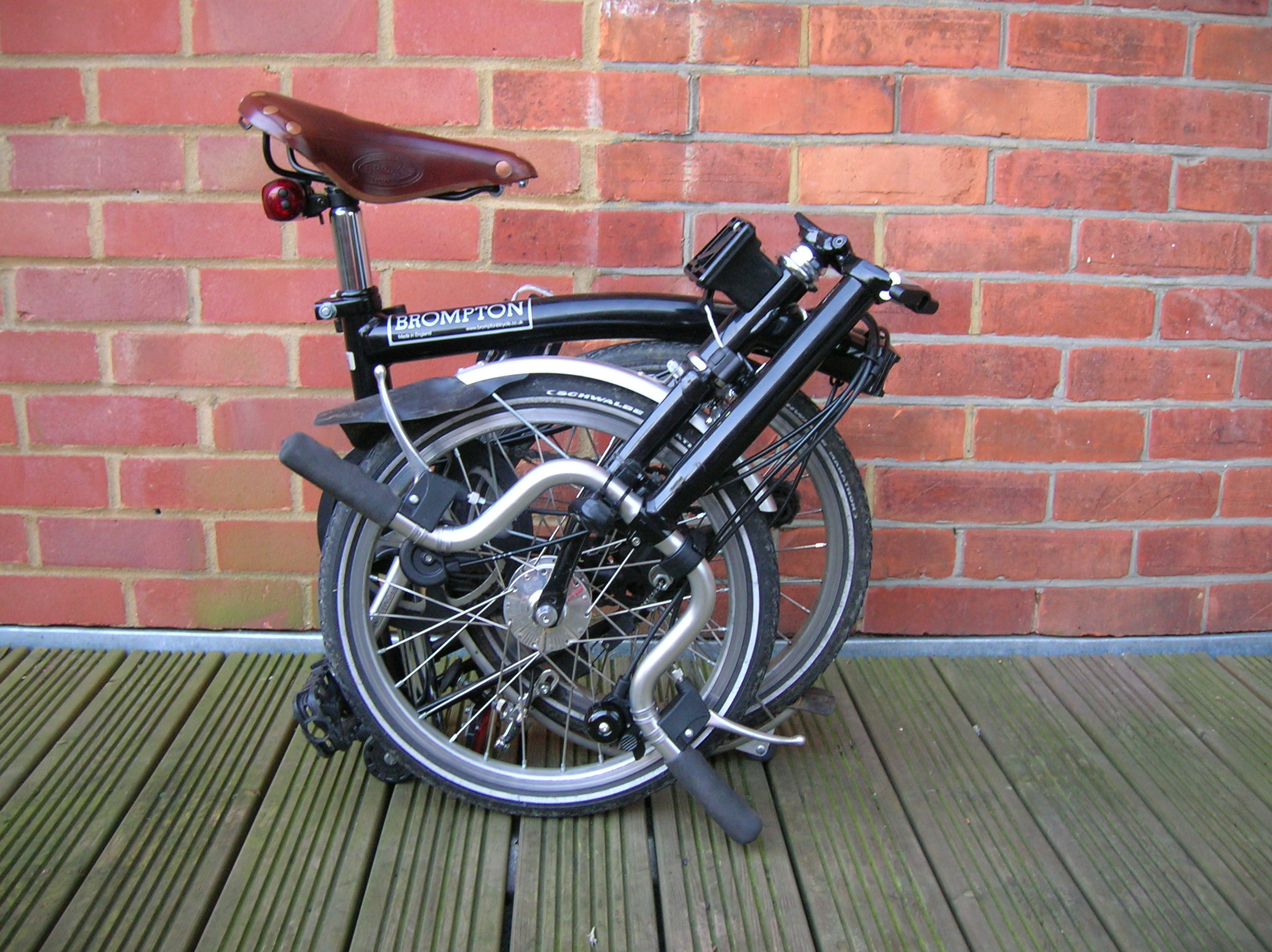
Folded Brompton

This British WWII Airborne BSA folding bicycle was rigged so that, when parachuted, the handlebars and seat were the first parts to hit the ground (as bent wheels would disable the bike). BSA abandoned the traditional diamond bicycle design as too weak for the shock and instead made an elliptical frame of twin parallel tubes, one forming the top tube and seat stays, and the other the chainstay and down tube. The hinges were in front of the bottom bracket and in the corresponding position in front of the saddle, fastened by wing nuts. The peg pedals could be pushed in to avoid snagging and further reduce the space occupied during transit.

From 1942 to 1945, the British WWII Airborne BSA folding bicycle was used by British & Commonwealth airborne troops, Commandos, and some infantry regiments; some were also used as run-abouts on military bases. The bicycle was used by British paratroopers, Commandos, and second-wave infantry units on the D-Day landings and at the Battle of Arnhem.

The 1970s saw increased interest in the folding bike, and the popular Raleigh Twenty and Bickerton Portable have become the iconic folders of their decade. It was, however, the early 1980s that can be said to have marked the birth of the modern, compact folding bicycle, with competing models from Brompton and Dahon. Founded in 1982, by inventor and physicist Dr. David Hon and his brother Henry Hon, Dahon has grown to become the world's largest manufacturer of folding bikes, with a two-thirds marketshare in 2006. Dahon, the biggest producer, has had the most influence on the market, with dozens of its 300+ patents having now become commonplace in the industry.

Overlaid photos of two KHS bicycles, one a F20 510 mm (20 in) wheel folding bicycle and the other a Flite 100 700c (622 mm) wheel racing bike, showing similarities in the geometry and riding position.

== Size ==
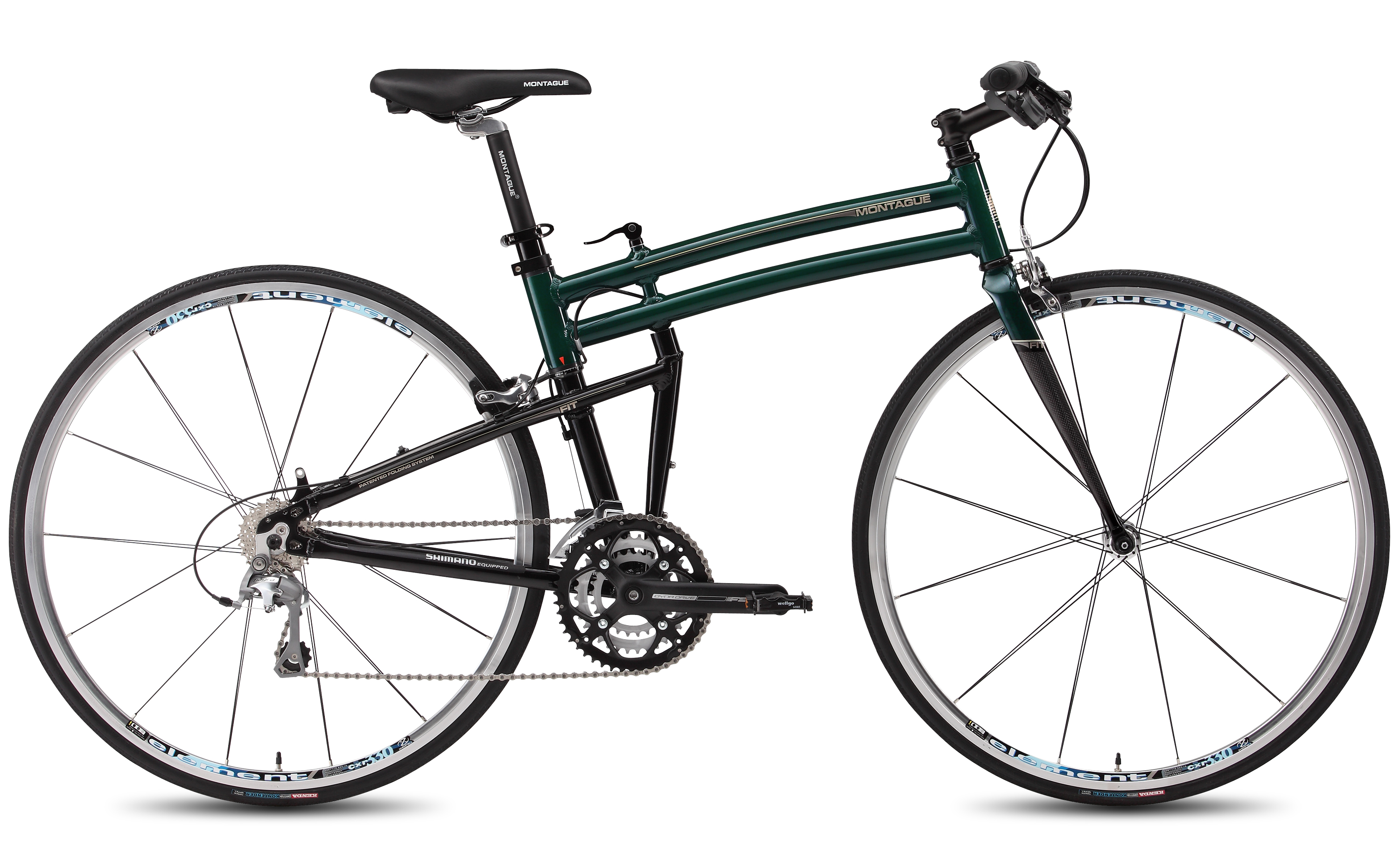
An example of a full-size folding bike from Montague, with 700c (622 mm) wheels.

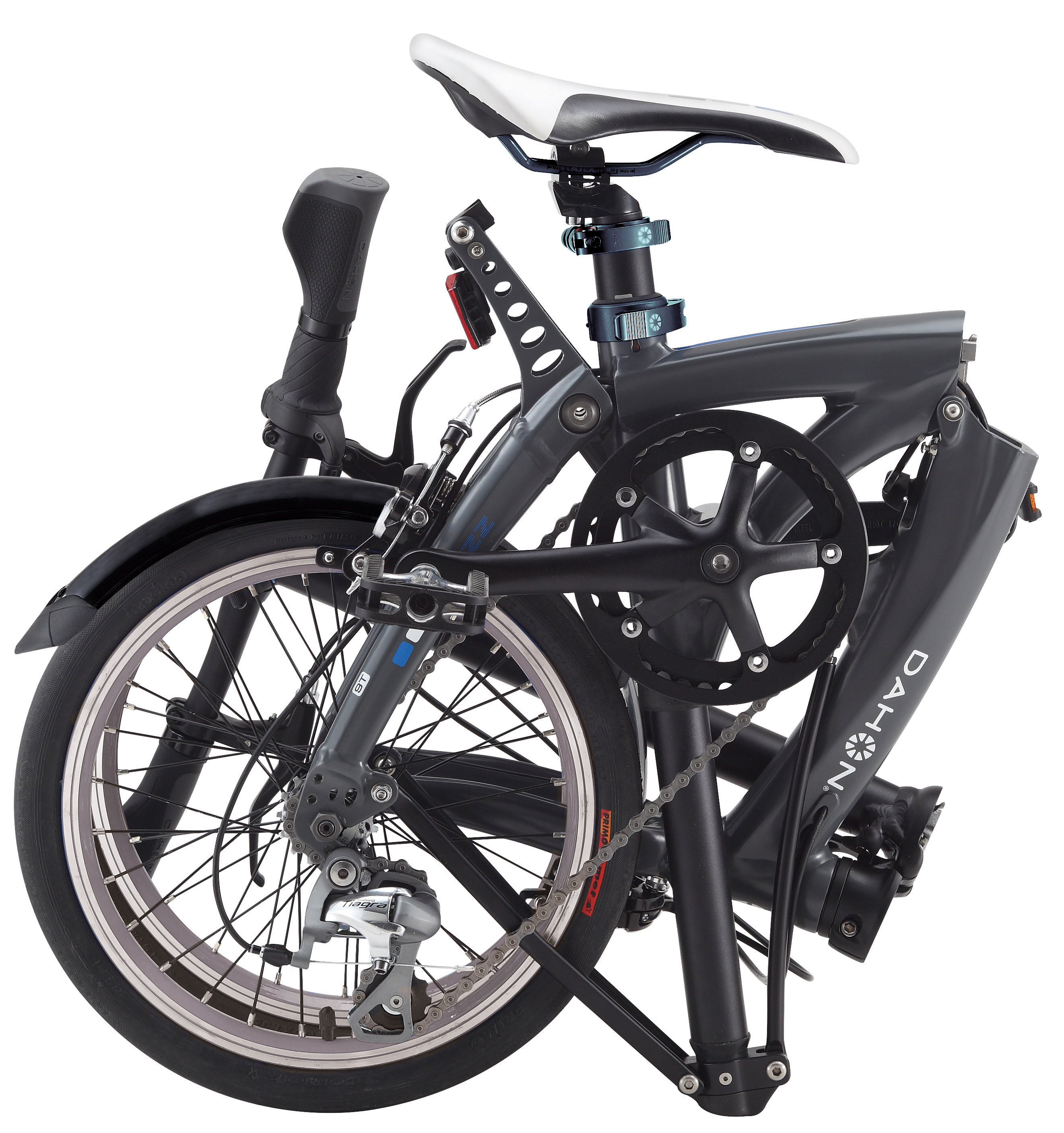
Dahon EEZZ, a vertical folding bike.

Folding bikes generally come with a wider range of adjustments for accommodating various riders than do conventional bikes, because folding bike frames are usually only made in one size. However, seatposts and handlebar stems on folders extend as much as four times higher than conventional bikes, and still longer after-market posts and stems provide an even greater range of adjustment.

While folders are usually smaller in overall size than conventional bicycles, the distances among the center of bottom bracket, the top of the saddle, and the handlebars – the primary factors in determining whether or not a bicycle fits its rider – are usually similar to those of conventional bikes. The wheelbase of many folding designs is also very similar to that of conventional, non-folding, bicycles.

Some manufacturers are producing folding bikes designed around folding systems that allow them to use 660 mm (26 in) wheels, e.g., Dahon, KHS, Montague, and Tern Bicycles. Advantages of smaller wheels include potential for more speed, quicker acceleration, greater maneuverability, and easier storage. For example, the A-bike is similar to the Strida but has tiny wheels and folds a bit smaller. Bikes with smaller than 410 mm (16 in) wheels are often called portable bicycles. These forgo the performance and easy ride benefits of their larger counterparts, acquiring characteristics similar to those of an adult folding kick scooter. Nonetheless, regardless of how each bike folds, the result is easier to transport and store than a traditional bicycle.

== Folding methods ==
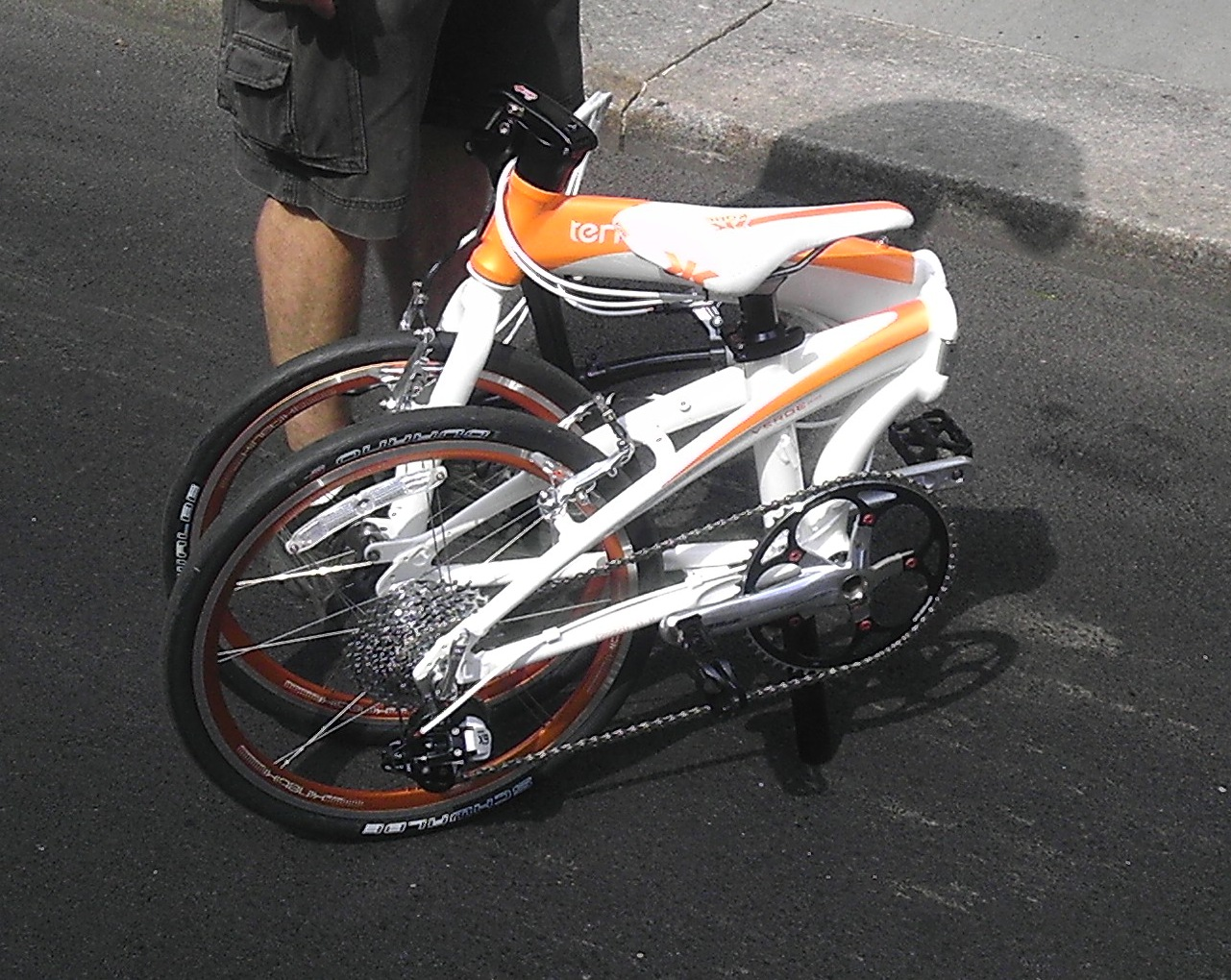
The Tern Verge X10 is an example of a half-fold bike.

Folding mechanisms are highly variable.

=== Half- or mid-fold ===
Many folding frames follow the classic frame pattern of the safety bicycle's diamond frame, but feature a hinge point (with single or double hinges) allowing the bicycle to fold approximately in half. Quick-release clamps enable raising or lowering steering and seat columns. A similar swing hinge may be combined with a folding steering column. Fold designs may use larger wheels, even the same size as in non-folders, for users prioritizing ride over fold compactness. Bikes that use this kind of fold include, Dahon, Montague and Tern.

=== Vertical Fold ===
Instead of folding horizontally, this style of bike has one or two hinges along the main tube or chain and seat stays that allow the bike to fold vertically. The result leaves the two wheels side by side but is often more compact than a horizontally hinged design. The Brompton and Dahon Qix D8 both feature vertical folding.

=== Triangle hinge ===
A hinge in the frame may allow the rear triangle and wheel to be folded down and flipped forward, under the main frame tube, as in the Bike Friday, Brompton Mezzo Folder, and Swift Folder. Such a flip hinge may be combined with a folding front fork, as in the Birdy. Swing and flip hinges may be combined on the same frame, as in the Brompton Mezzo Folder and Dahon, which use a folding steering column. Folding mechanisms typically involve latches and quick releases, which affect the speed of the fold/unfold. Bike Friday offers a model, the Tikit, featuring a cable-activated folding mechanism requiring no quick releases or latches, for increased folding speed.

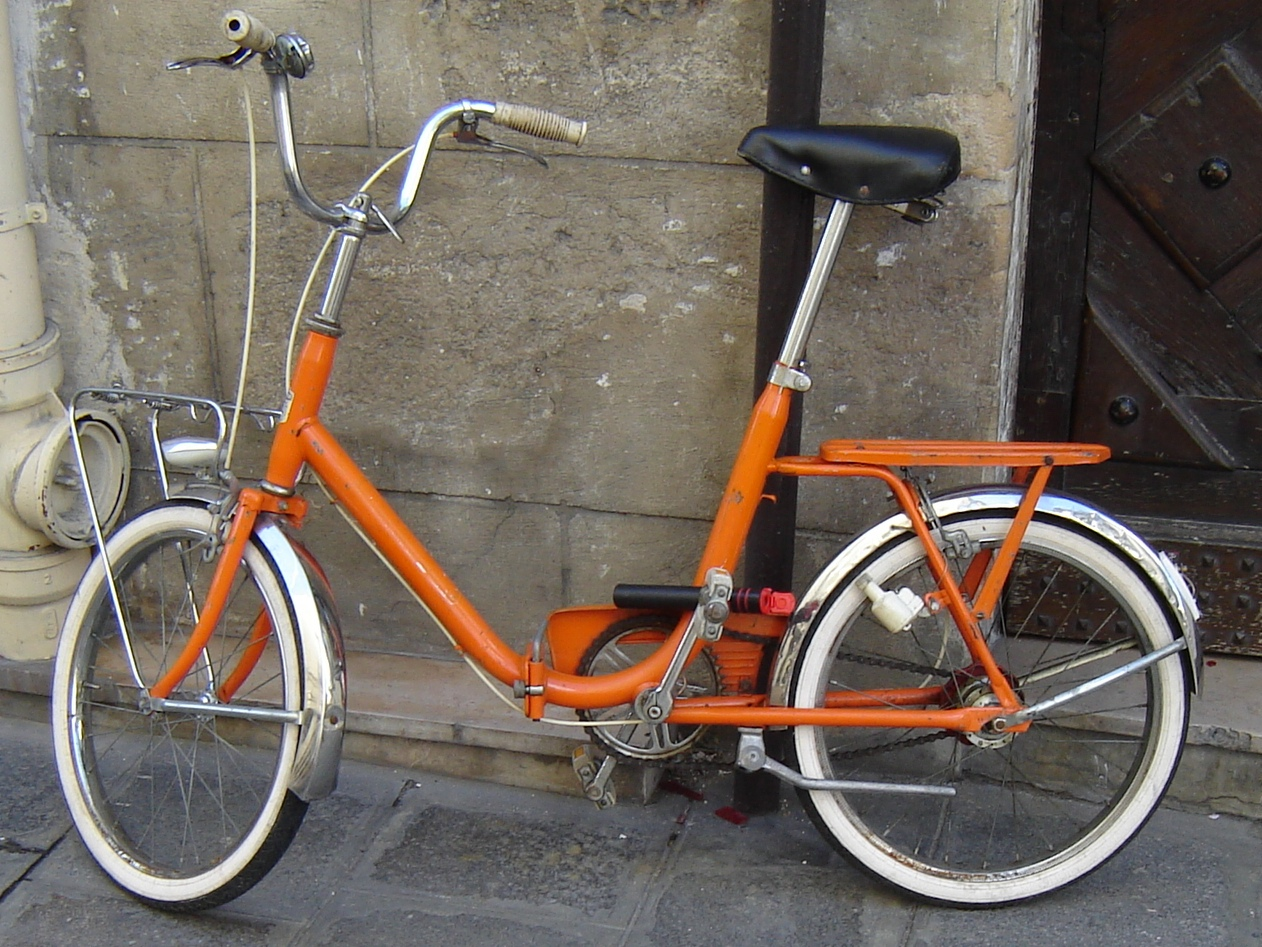
1960s European folding bicycle, showing hinged frame and quick release handlebar stem allowing the bars to turn parallel to the frame when folded.

=== Magnet folding and suspension system ===
A magnet combined with a rear shock absorber forms the folding mechanism. The magnet connects and locks the back wheel section to the frame. To fold the bike in half, the magnet disconnects with one movement and in a second, and without having to use one's hands, the rear wheel rotates forward, and the bike folds vertically. This mechanism also enables one to roll the half-folded bike on its rear wheel.

=== Break away and other styles ===
Bikes may partly fold and partly disassemble for packing into a standard or custom sized suitcase for air travel (e.g., Airnimal and Bike Friday). Other variations include: bicycle torque coupling, a proprietary connector system that can be retrofitted to a standard frame; the Gekko, which folds from the seat tube like an upside down umbrella; the Giatex, which folds and retracts, adjusting to the size of the rider; the iXi, which literally breaks into two-halves; and the Strida, which has a triangular frame and folds to resemble a unicycle.

Folding mechanisms may incur more cost and weight, allow folding smaller, and they tend to use smaller wheels. 610 mm (24 in) wheels are the largest for which flip hinges are generally used, but smaller wheels, typically 410 or 510 mm (16 or 20 in), are more common.

Smaller size does not mean lighter weight, as most of these designs forgo the bracing benefits of the diamond frame and must compensate as a step-through frame does, with thicker metal. The step-through design is a boon to a wider range of rider size, age, and physical ability.

Another system found on folders, such as Montague Bikes, uses the seat tube as a pivot point for the frame to fold. This system uses a tube within a tube design to give the bike more torsional stiffness. It allows the user to fold the bike without "breaking" any vital tubes down, thus preserving the structural integrity of the diamond frame. This system is operated by a single quick release found along the top tube of the bike.

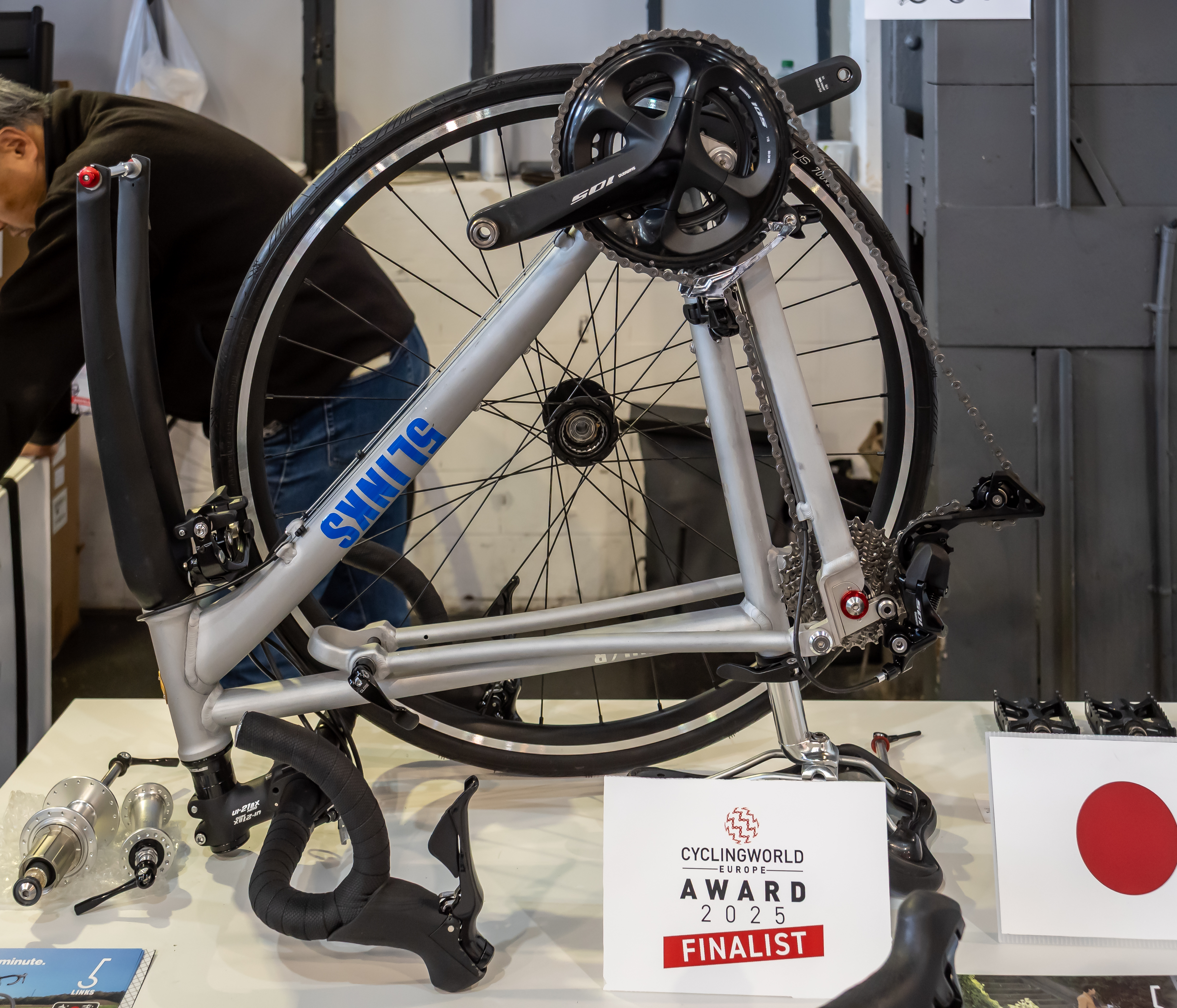
Full size folding road bike, where the rear triangle folds into the main frame

== Portability ==
The primary purpose of folding a bike is to increase its portability. This is so that it may be more easily transported and stored, and thus allow greater flexibility. Many public transportation systems ban or restrict unfolded bicycles, but allow folded bikes all or some of the time. For example, Transport for London allows folding bikes at all times on the Underground, but on buses it is down to the driver's discretion. Some transport operators only allow folding bicycles if they are enclosed in a bag or cover. Airline baggage regulations often permit folding bikes as ordinary luggage, without extra cost.

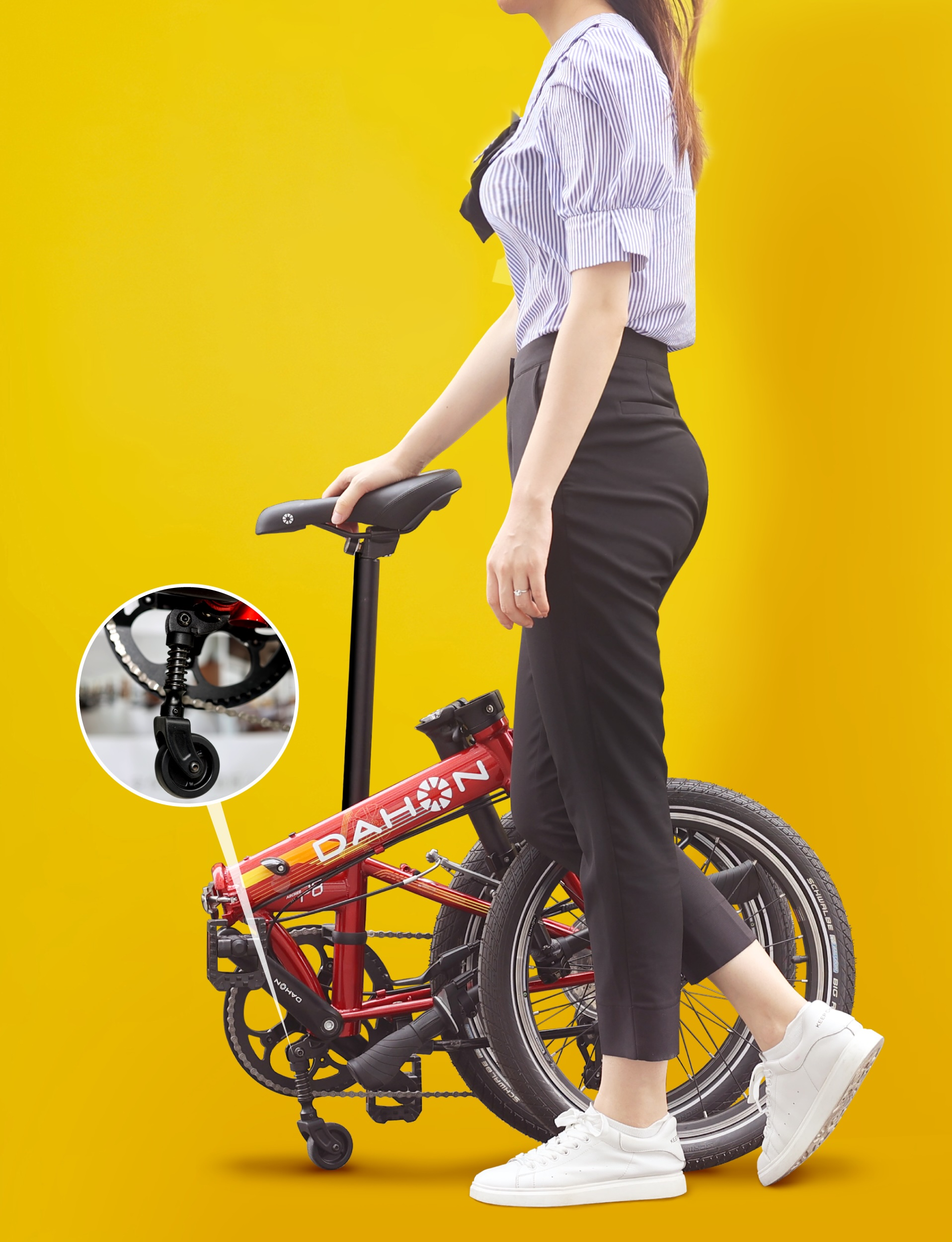
Landing Gear is a patented design by Dahon.

Rolling wheels are installed for some folding bikes for ease of portage when folded. For example, Dahon designed the Landing Gear, a specialized device that attaches to the bottom of the bike frame near the pedals. It features a foldable wheel that provides additional support when the bike is folded. This support makes it easy to maneuver the bike in its compact, folded state, offering exceptional convenience for everyday use.

== Motorized ==
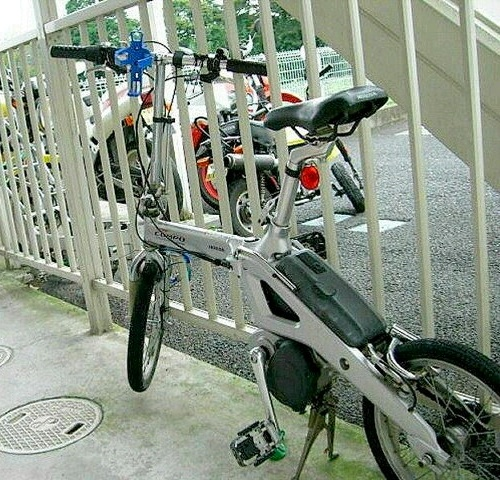
Honda Step Compo

The first folding electric bike was the Honda Step Compo in 2000. Many more were introduced in the next 20 years.

== Examples ==
Notable folding bicycles include:

- A-bike
- Bike Friday
- Bickerton
- Birdy
- Bootie
- Bridgestone Picnica
- Brompton Bicycle
- Dahon
- Di Blasi
- KHS Bicycles
- Melon Bicycles
- Montague Bikes
- Raleigh Twenty
- Strida
- Swift Folder
- Tern

== See also ==
- List of bicycle manufacturing companies
- Outline of cycling
- Portable bicycle – a folding bicycle that is small and light enough to be easily carried afoot or in a cramped vehicle. Portable bicycles compromise riding capability for portability.
- Small-wheel bicycle
- Swing bicycle

== Bibliography ==
- Guinness World Records 2000 Millennium Edition. New York: Guinness Publishing Ltd./Bantam Books. 2000. ISBN 0-553-58268-2.
