= Network Charter School =

Public school in Eugene, Oregon, United States

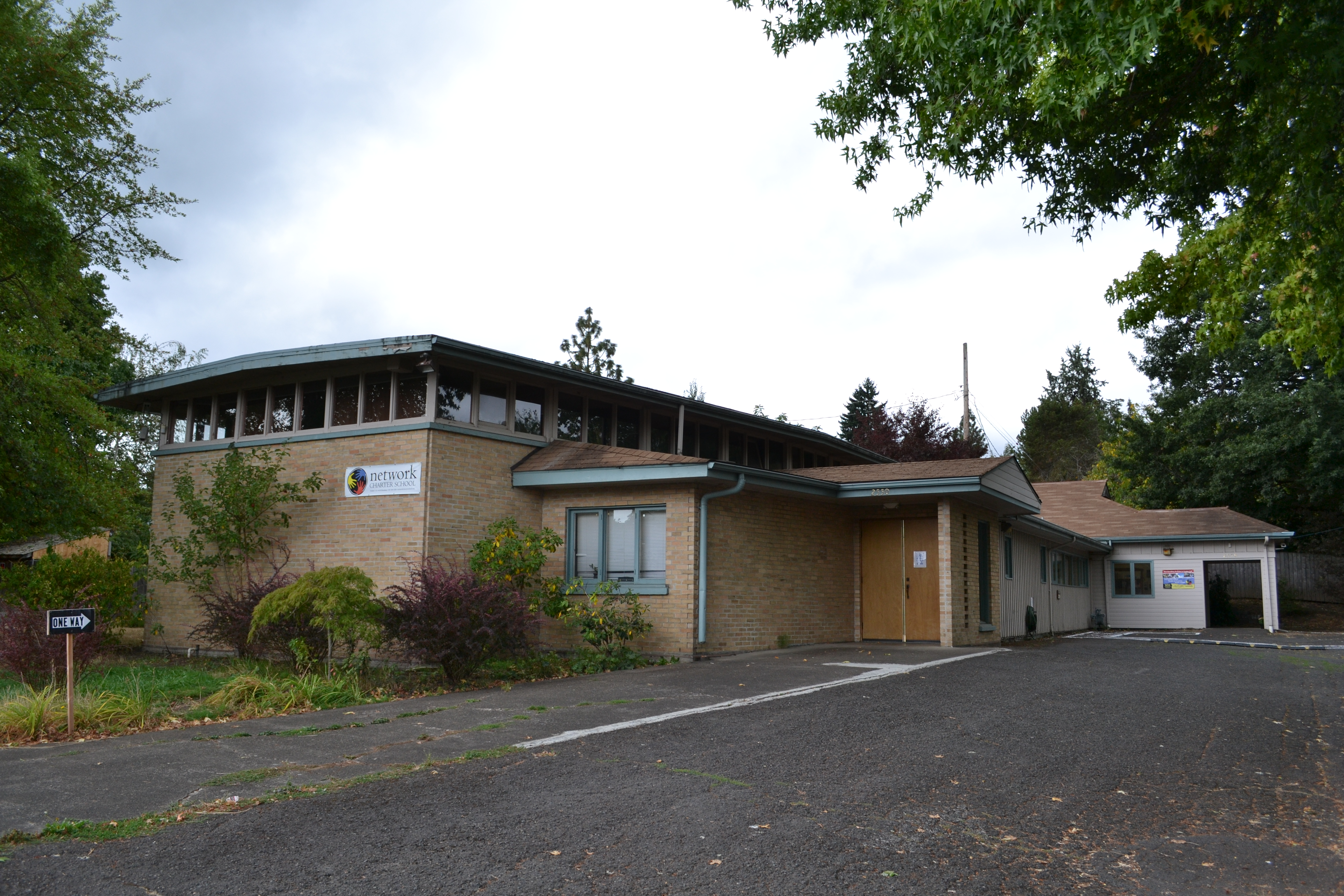

Location
- 2550 Portland St. Eugene, (Lane County), Oregon 97405; United States; 44.030589°N 123.09252°W

Information
- Type: Public
- School district: Eugene School District
- Principal: Penny Studt
- Teaching staff: 8.50 (FTE)
- Grades: 7-12
- Enrollment: 117 (2023-2024)
- Student to teacher ratio: 13.76
- Website: www.networkcharterschool.net

Network Charter School is a public charter school in Eugene, Oregon, United States. It is a small public charter school with between 90 and 130 students enrolled in grades 8-12. Classes are offered in a variety of locations through a network of community education organizations, including Le Petit Gourmet, Material Exchange Center for Community Art (MECCA), Nearby Nature, and Heartwise Studio. The unique offerings of the Network include class sizes of 10-15 students, practical and multicultural opportunities, and career-related learning. The school also offers a culinary arts program that provides breakfast and lunch for the student body every day. These meals are prepared by students enrolled in various culinary courses.

Network Charter School also partners with the White Bird Clinic's CAHOOTS (Crisis Assistance Helping Out On The Streets) mobile health services on site. CAHOOTS offers free counseling and mental health services for Network Charter School students and their families.

== Academics ==
In 2008, 29% of the school's seniors received a high school diploma. Of 24 students, seven graduated, 12 dropped out, and five were still in high school the following year. In the decade between 2008 and 2018, Network Charter School has improved dramatically. In the 2018–2019 school year, 58% of students graduated within 5 years. Additionally, freshman who are "on-track" to graduate increased by 19% and students graduating within four years increased by 11%.

Network Charter School focuses on a community-based approach to education. Community service is an integrated part of the curriculum offered at Network Charter School and students are required to serve at least 20 hours per year that they are enrolled. Through the organizations that compose Network Charter School, students have several unique opportunities to engage in local events and work with businesses in Eugene and the surrounding area. In 2019, Le Petit Gourmet's culinary students won second place for Best Sweet Bite at Chef's Night Out, an annual competition between local restaurants. Students in Nearby Nature regularly participate in community and urban renewal projects. In 2018, student-volunteers helped paint a mural spanning a bridge in Alton Baker Park. On Earth Day 2019, students working with Nearby Nature helped remove over 1,100 pounds of trash and waste from Alton Baker Park.
