= Tern (company) =

Taiwanese bicycle company

Tern Bicycles
- Industry: Manufacturing
- Founded: 2011
- Founder: Florence Shen, Joshua Hon
- Headquarters: Taipei, Taiwan
- Key people: Florence Shen (general manager), Joshua Hon (vice president)
- Products: Folding bicycles Electric bicycles Cycling accessories
- Website: ternbicycles.com

Tern is a privately held company that designs, manufactures, markets, and sells bicycles for everyday use. The company is based in Taipei, Taiwan and has offices in the US, China, Finland, and the UK. The company's primary products include folding bicycles, electric bicycles, and cycling accessories which are currently sold in 65 countries.

== History ==
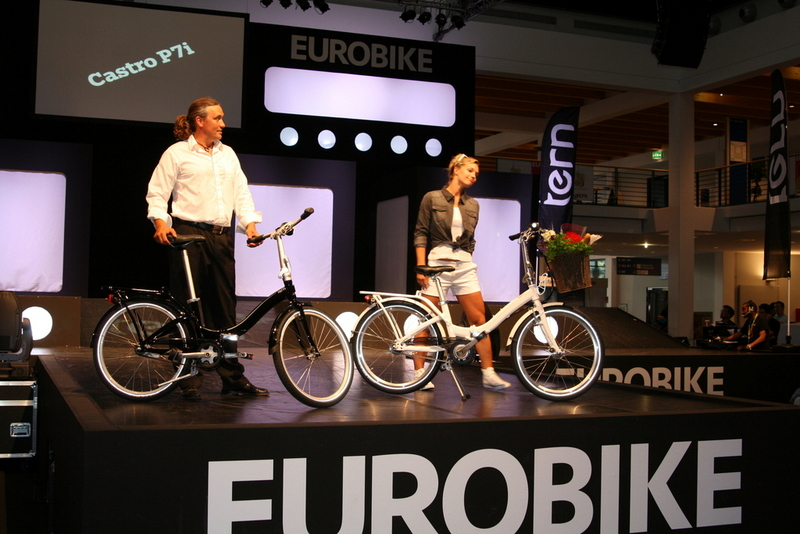
Tern's public debut at Eurobike 2011

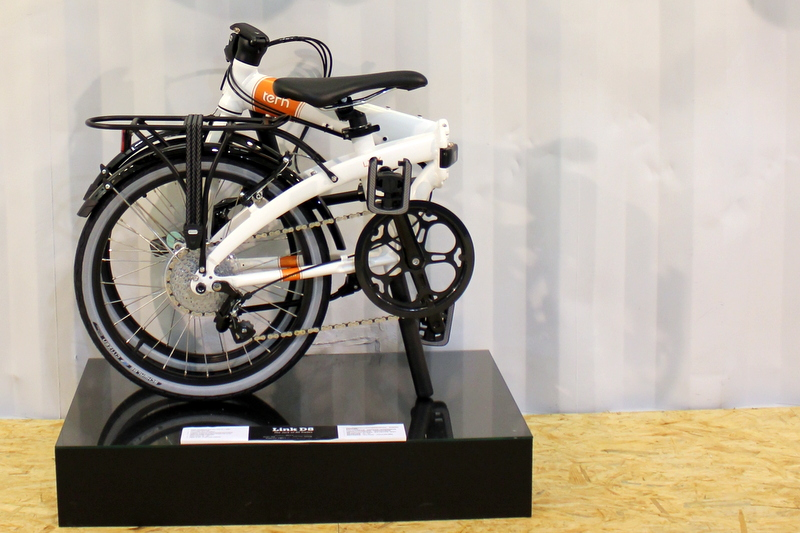
A folded Link D8

Tern was founded by Florence Shen and Joshua Hon, wife and son of David T. Hon, founder of the established Dahon brand of folding bicycles. Initially the company was the subject of litigation between Dahon and the founders, but a settlement was reached in 2013. The Arctic tern was the inspiration for the company name, due to the fact that it travels the longest distance of all migratory animals and is light and small, qualities the company attributes to its bicycles. The company's website favicon is of an origami tern taking flight.

== Products ==
Tern currently has ten bike lines: GSD, HSD, Quick Haul, NBD, Vektron, Short Haul, BYB, Verge, Link, Eclipse, Node, and Roji. Each bike line offers different models with different specifications. Tern also has an accessory lineup, which includes its sister brand BioLogic. In August 2014, Tern announced its first electric bike, the eLink. The eLink weighs 21 kilograms (46 lb) and folds in under 10 seconds. It is equipped with mudguards, rack, chainguard, lights, and features a Shimano Nexus 8 internal hub and Schwalbe Big Apple tyres.

Tern partnered with cargo bike specialist Xtracycles to create the Cargo Node, a folding cargo bike that uses the Tern Node bicycle and Xtracycles' rear cargo extension attachment. The companies announced the product via a Kickstarter campaign on September 17, 2015, and raised US$153,638 to help fund the project.

== Dahon lawsuit ==
From 2011, Tern was the subject of litigation between Dahon North America Inc. and Joshua and Florence Hon. Specifically, the lawsuit charged that Joshua Hon and Florence Hon breached their fiduciary duties as officers of Dahon to start the competing companies Mobility Holdings and Tern. On April 2, 2013, industry media reported that Dahon unilaterally declared its legal disputes with Tern were settled.
