= Veer Cycle =

Veer Cycle is an American manufacturer of drive belts for bicycles and light electric vehicles. The company introduced Split Belt as their first product in 2018, which is a belt that can be spliced with rivets, and therefore can be installed on bicycle frames with ordinary rear triangles (chainstay and seatstay). Veer claims their split belt is as strong as a chain, but with a higher efficiency. The belts are made of nitrile reinforced with carbon fibre, and can be used on vertical droputs or full suspension bikes by using a belt tensioner.

The split belt differs from non-splittable belts (for example those bicycle belts known from Gates Corporation) which require the use of specially designed bicycle frames for belt drive, for example having an opening at the fork end or an elevated chainstay to enable assembly of the belt-drive. In 2023, Veer also revealed a non-splittable belt aimed at high-torque e-bikes.

Veer has also shown a concept where the rear cog can change size (and thus gearing), a concept that is reminiscent of derailleurs and implies that a hub gear with planetary gears may not be necessary in order to implement multi-speed gears on a belt-driven bike.
