= Belt-driven bicycle =

Bicycle using a belt rather than a chain

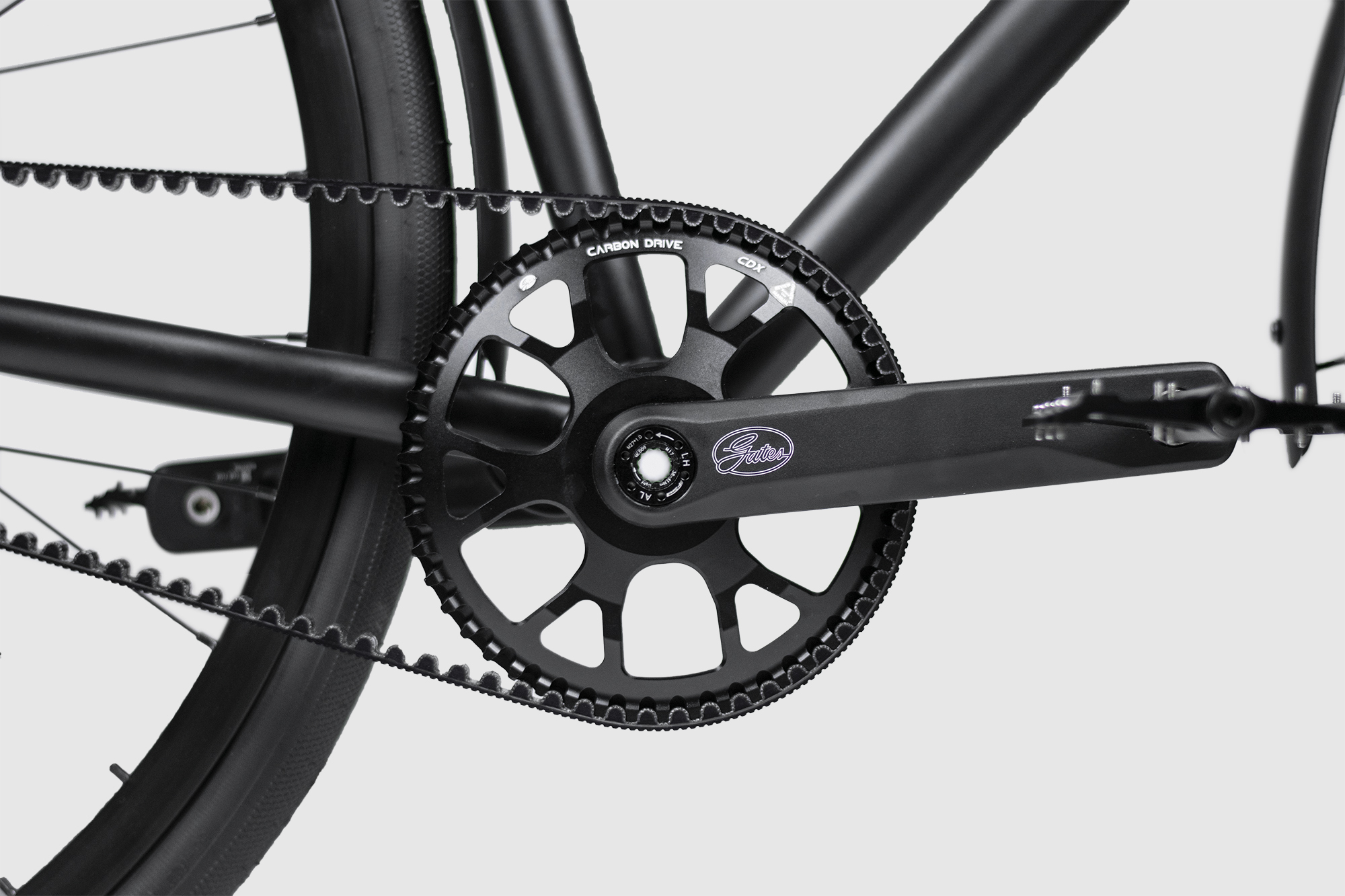
Gates bike belt drive system

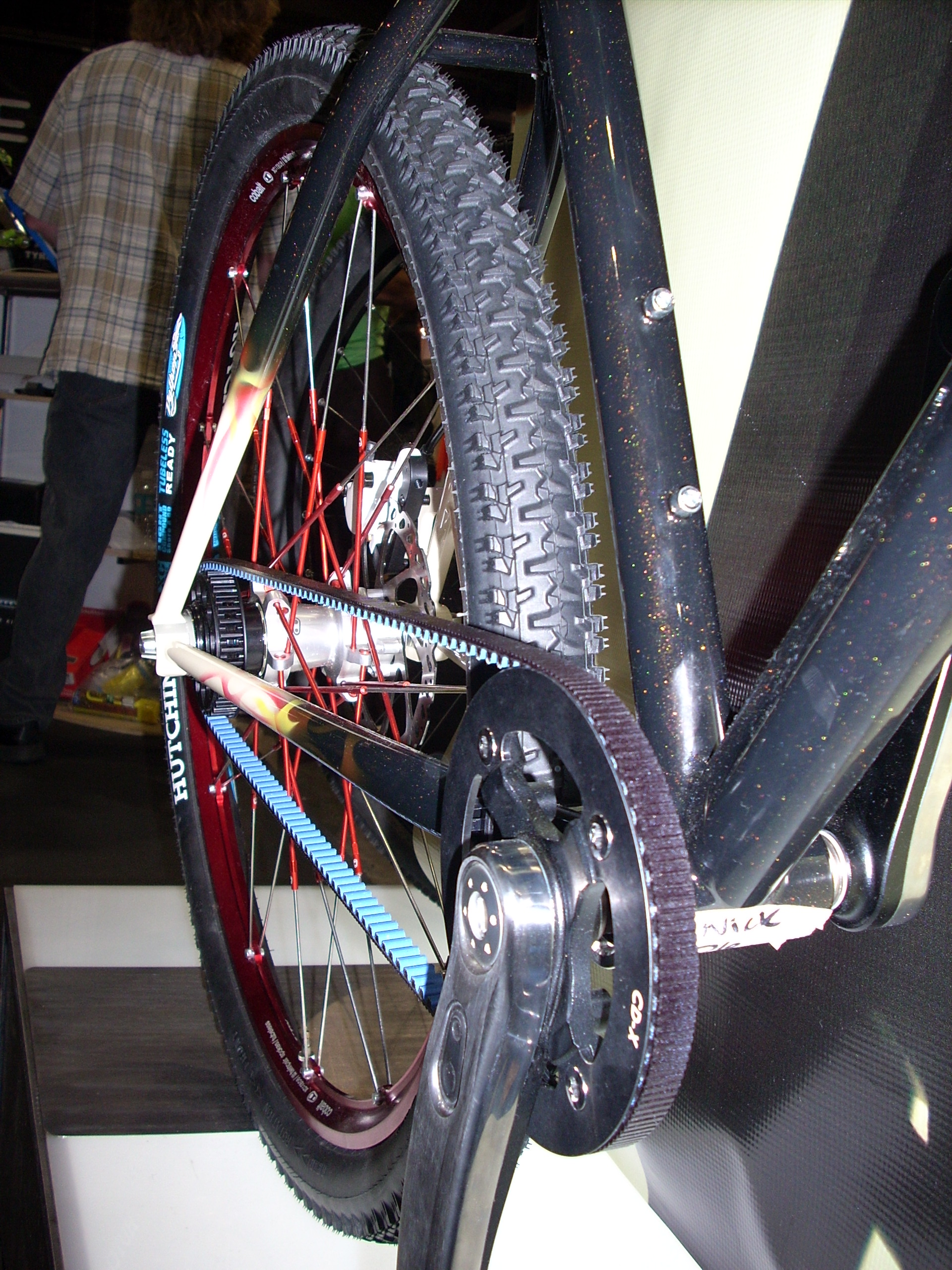
Belt-drive

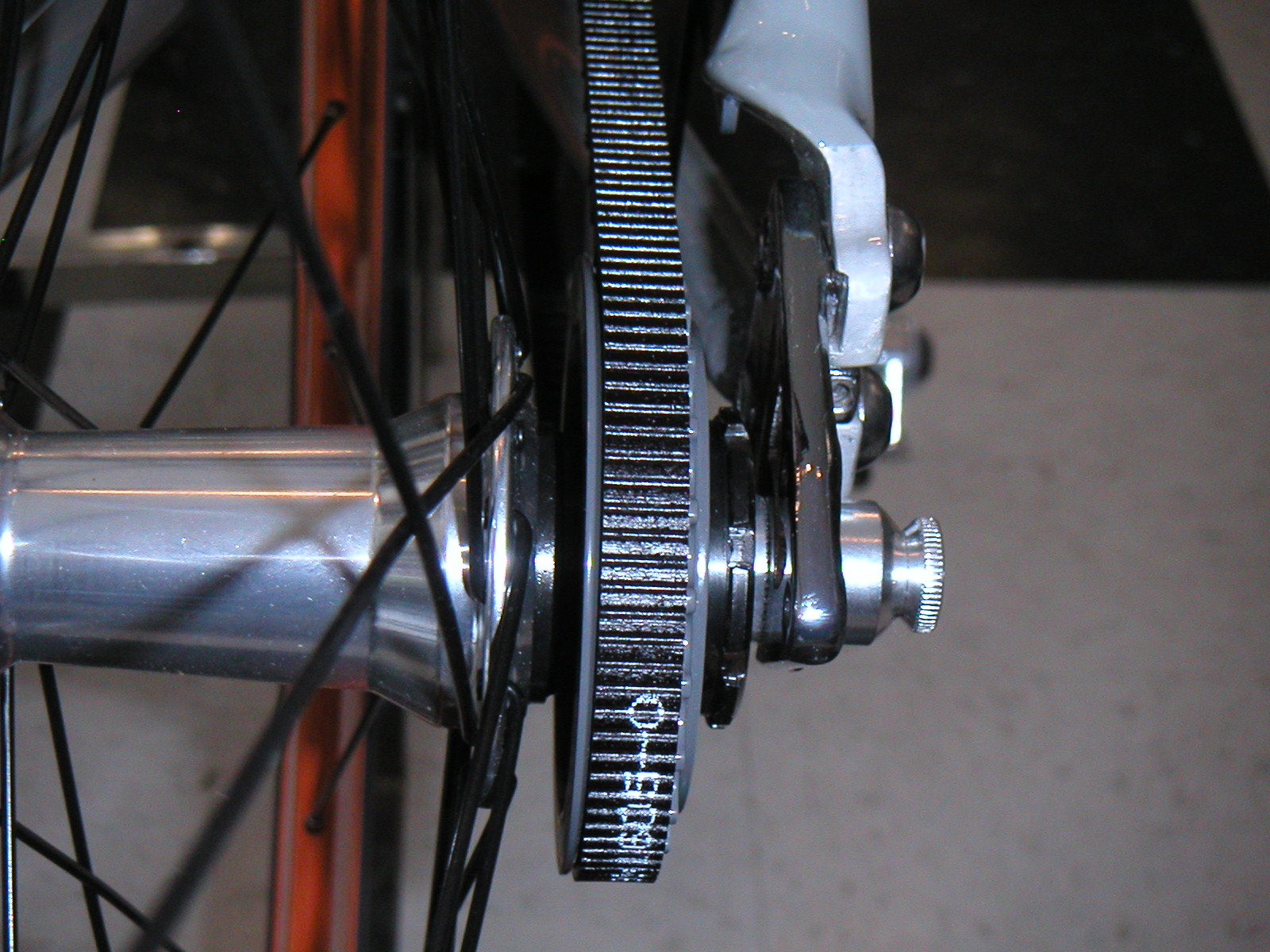
Belt-drive single-speed rear hub on a Trek District

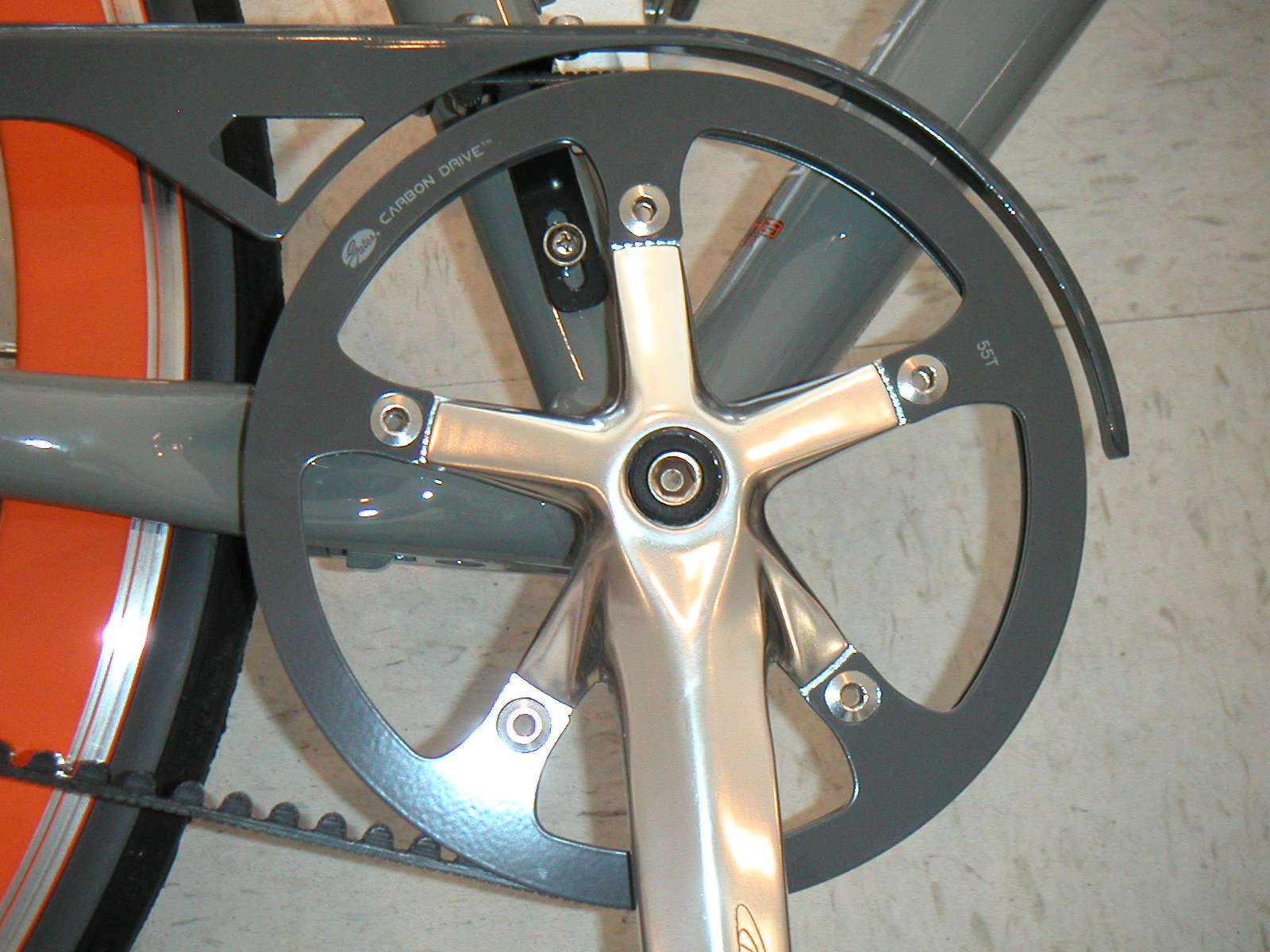
Belt-drive crankset on a Trek District

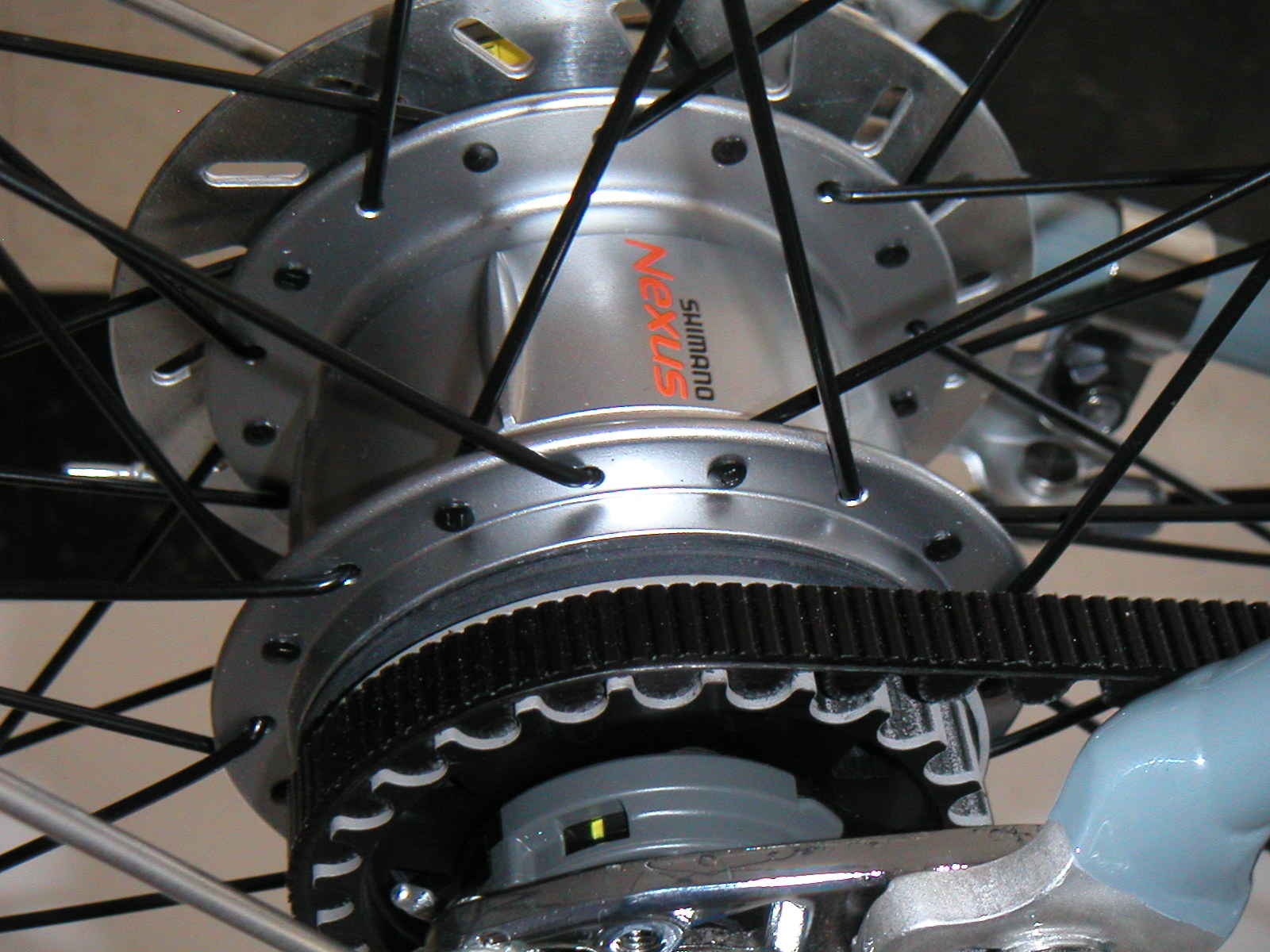
Belt-drive multi-speed rear hub gear on a Trek Soho

A belt-driven bicycle is a chainless bicycle that uses a flexible belt, typically of synchronous toothed design, instead of a chain to transmit power from the pedals to the drive wheel.

The application of belt drives to bicycles is growing, especially in the commuter bicycle market, because of the low maintenance and lubrication-free benefits. Belt drives are also available for stationary and fitness bicycles.

== Benefits ==
- No chance of rust.
- Little to no maintenance, in particular:
  - No need for lubrication.
- Cleanliness due to lack of lubrication.
- Smoother operation.
- Quieter operation than chain drive.
- Greater durability than metal chains.
- In some cases, lower weight than chain drive.

== Drawbacks ==
- Derailleurs cannot be used, so a hub gear is used if multiple gear ratios are required.
- Most belts cannot be taken apart as a chain can, so a frame must be able to accommodate the belt by having an opening in the rear triangle or an elevated chain stay. There is only one option where the belt can be spliced and joined through the rear triangle.
- Belts come in limited selection of lengths, which must be accommodated in the design of the frame.
- Belt-driven bicycles and their repair or replacement parts are scarcer at shops than bicycles with conventional chain.
- Front and rear pulleys or sprockets must be well aligned to avoid excessive friction and wear. A chain is more flexible in this respect.
- Compared to a chain, belts typically run at a higher tension. This is done in order to avoid skipping of the belt while in use. However, high belt tensions can reduce the life expectancy of the bearings in the bottom bracket, as well as in the rear hub.
- First-generation pulleys with dual guides had problems with snow becoming compacted and trapped in the pulley (up to complete inoperability in some cases). Second generation (one guide, wheel side) and third generation (center guide) improve upon the design.

== Tensioning ==
Tensioning can be implemented in all the same ways that single-speed chain drives can be tensioned.

- The fork ends for the rear axle are horizontal, in line with the belt, with or without chain tugs, which allows the distance between the rear wheel axle and the crank axle to be adjusted.
- The fork ends themselves can be moved, to change the distance between the rear wheel axle and the crank spindle.
- The fork ends are fixed but there is a separate tensioner pulley, which changes the travel distance of the belt.
Bicycle tensioners.
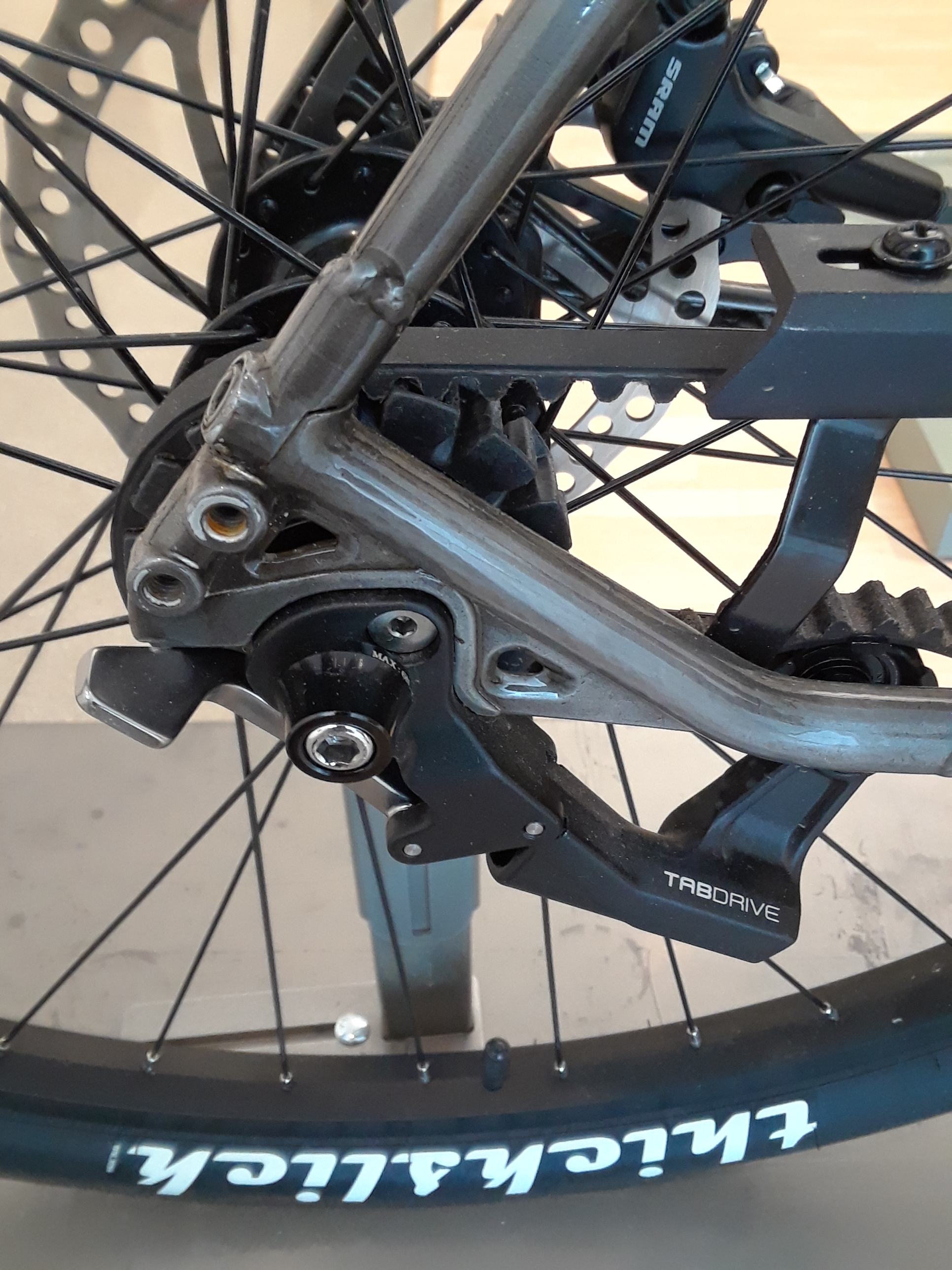
Tensioner pully. (behind bar at middle right edge)

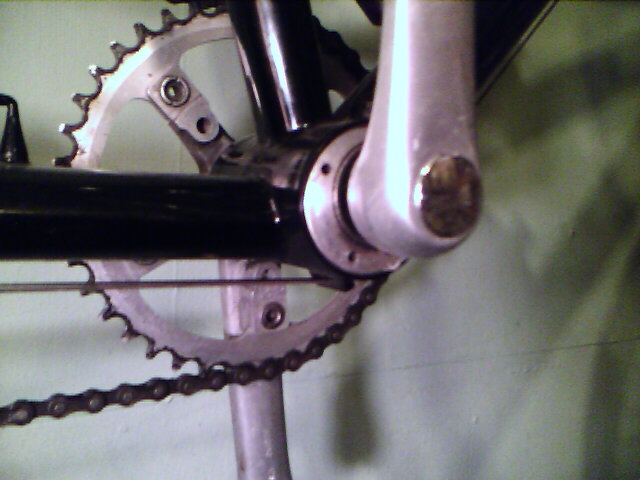
Eccentric bottom bracket.

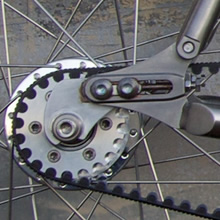
Horizontal fork ends.

== History ==
A belt drive for a bicycle was patented in the United States on April 8, 1890 by Charles D. Rice, Patent # 425,390.

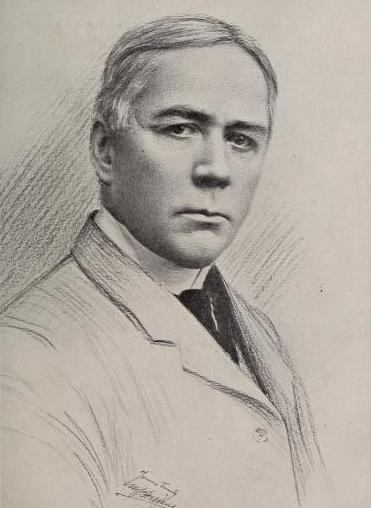
Mathew J. Steffens

In 1898, Mathew Joseph Steffens of Chicago, Illinois received a patent for a rear-wheel drive electric bicycle using a driving belt attached to the periphery of the pneumatic-tired wheel. By the early 1900s, some motorcycles were using leather drive belts.

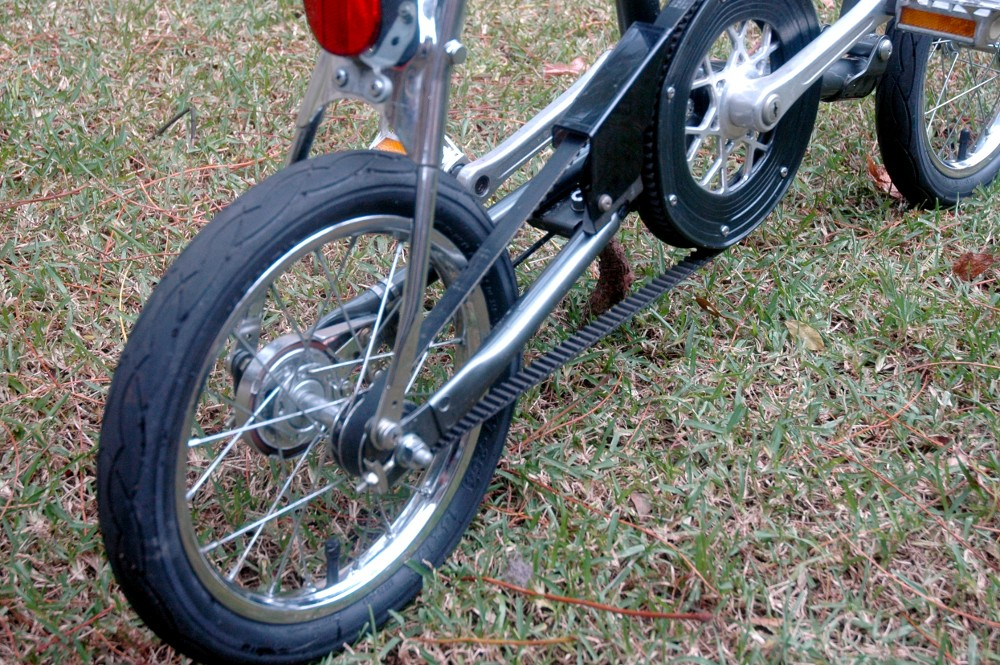
Bridgestone Picnica

The Bridgestone Picnica belt-drive bicycle was introduced in the early 1980s. It used a tooth-belt drive like auto timing belts and Harley-Davidson drive belts, along with a novel two-part chainring that increased belt tension with increasing load. The Picnica was a folding bicycle, and part of the appeal of the belt drive was cleanliness. The Picnica was a small-wheel bicycle, so belt tension may have been less than on a bicycle with standard-size wheels. It was apparently successful, but was offered mainly in Japan.

Bridgestone offered belt-drive bicycles in the USA until they left the market about 1994. Since their innovation, they have continuously offered belt-drive bicycles in Japan including their best-selling Albelt model.

In 1984 and 1985, Mark Sanders, a designer who had earned his degree in mechanical engineering from Imperial College, London, designed a folding bicycle as part of his graduate studies in an Industrial Design Engineering (IDE) program. The program was run jointly by Imperial College and the Royal College of Art in London. He collaborated with a design engineer from Gates Corporation to outfit his bicycle with a belt, rather than a chain.

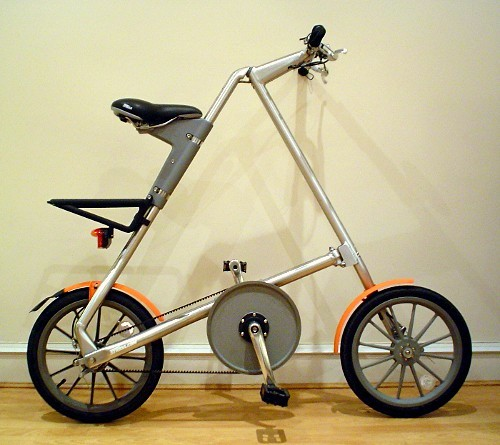
Strida 3 with kevlar belt drive

When his project was complete, Sanders chose entrepreneur and former Greg Norman manager James Marshall and a Glasgow manufacturer to turn his award-winning design into a product. The manufacturer coined the name Strida, and in 1987 the bicycle began rolling off the production line. In 2002 production was moved to Taiwanese manufacturer Ming Cycle in order to meet increased demand, and as of 2007, Ming Cycle fully owned the Strida brand and intellectual property rights.

iXi bicycles, distributed in the United States by Delta Cycle Corporation, followed in 2004 with a compact design that, like Strida, featured a belt drive. Other folding-bike manufacturers that have implemented a belt drive include U.S. company Bike Friday and Netherlands-based Bernds.

In 2007, Gates Corporation developed a high-modulus 8mm synchronous belt and sprocket system called the Carbon Drive System. The belt's pitch allowed for lower tension requirements to help prevent skipping. Lightweight, patent-pending sprockets have mud ports, openings under each tooth, which work to slough off debris.

In 2009, an increasing number of bicycle companies, including Trek and f8 Cycles, offered belt-driven bicycles. While builders initially focused on single-speeds and internal hubs, in early 2009 f8 used a Gates-compatible fixed-gear cog designed by Phil Wood & Co., offering a belt-driven fixed-gear bicycle.

In 2009, Wayne Lumpkin, owner of Spot Brand and best known as the founder of Avid, designed a belt system called CenterTrack. In 2010, Gates Corporation acquired a patent from Lumpkin for CenterTrack, a new belt-and-pulley design that improves on the initial Carbon Drive System design. CenterTrack is more tolerant to misalignment than its predecessors. It is also lighter, 20% stronger due to a wider 11mm belt, yet has narrower pulleys, making packaging with the latest generation of internally geared hubs much easier. The company’s CDX belt is the first belt drive designed for severe off-road use on mountain bikes.

In 2010, Daimler introduced the Smart eBike, a power-electric hybrid bicycle featuring Gates Carbon drive-belt system. The eBike is designed for a clean, grease-free ride. Other notable eBike brands include Grace and Pi-Mobility.

In 2012, Continental AG’s subsidiary ContiTech introduced the CONTI® DRIVE SYSTEM for bicycles. The CDS belt drive shared the basic operation of the early 8mm Gates Carbon Drive system, but employed aramid instead of carbon fibers in its construction. The Conti CDS was designed exclusively for ‘normal use on properly laid’ roads and paths. ContiTech eventually switched to carbon belts for bicycle use, citing issues with traction using aramid fibers.

The CDS belt drive was utilized on some Trek bicycles and the Sladda utility cycle marketed by IKEA of Sweden. After reports of failures of the belt itself and a recall, CDS was withdrawn from the belt-drive bicycle market.

In 2018, Veer Cycles created the first belt drive conversion kit that allows riders to convert their chain driven bikes to belt drives. The belt is spliced to fit through the rear triangle and eliminates the need for a frame with a split already in it. Veer has also shown a concept where the rear cog can change size (and thus gearing), a concept that is reminiscent of derailleurs and implies that a hub gear with planetary gears may not be necessary in order to implement multi-speed gears on a belt-driven bike.

The possibilities for belt-driven bicycles are increasing as manufacturers of internal hub gears (gears inside the rear hub, which allow riders of belt-driven bicycles to shift easily) introduce new designs such as the Shimano Alfine 11 and Fallbrook Technologies's NuVinci. Other major internally geared hub makers include SRAM, Sturmey-Archer, Rohloff and Kindernay.

Another option to provide gears is to create a gearbox bicycle using a bracket-mounted gearbox like the Pinion P.18.

== Manufacturers ==
The belts are typically made by the same manufacturing companies that produce toothed belts for automobiles, machinery, and other synchronous belt-drive applications.

=== Belt-drive manufacturers ===
Current and former manufacturers of belt-drive bicycles and pedal belt-drive systems include:

- Advanced Belt Drive
- Bridgestone — Albelt, Beltrex
- Continental AG — CONTI® DRIVE SYSTEM (CDS) belt drives and sprockets Safety Advisory and Recall(discontinued 2018)
- Gates Corporation — CDX and CDN carbon belt drives, sprockets and cogs
- Veer Cycle
- Optibelt

=== OEM bicycle manufacturers ===
Current and former bicycle manufacturers who have incorporated belt-drive on their bicycles include:

- Avanti
- BMC Trading — Lifestyle models Urban Challenge and Mass Challenge
- Boardman – URB 9.4
- Canyon Safety Advisory for Continental CDS Belt
- Co-Motion Cycles — Americano, Pangea, CityView and Speedster (tandem) bicycle models
- Cube Bikes — Cube hyde pro
- Cycle Union
- Daimler – Smart eBike creators featuring Gates belt drive
- Diamant
- Focus Bikes
- Gazelle Bikes
- Ikea — SLADDA(discontinued 2018)
- Kalkhoff – Voyager De Luxe model and Endeavour 8 Gates
- Marin
- Priority Bicycles – Priority Classic & Priority 8
- Raleigh
- Riese and Muller
- Scott
- Specialized — Source Eleven model
- Strida — a portable, folding bicycle
- Trek Bicycle Company — District, Soho and Zektor bicycle models. Also under the Villager brand.

== Gallery ==
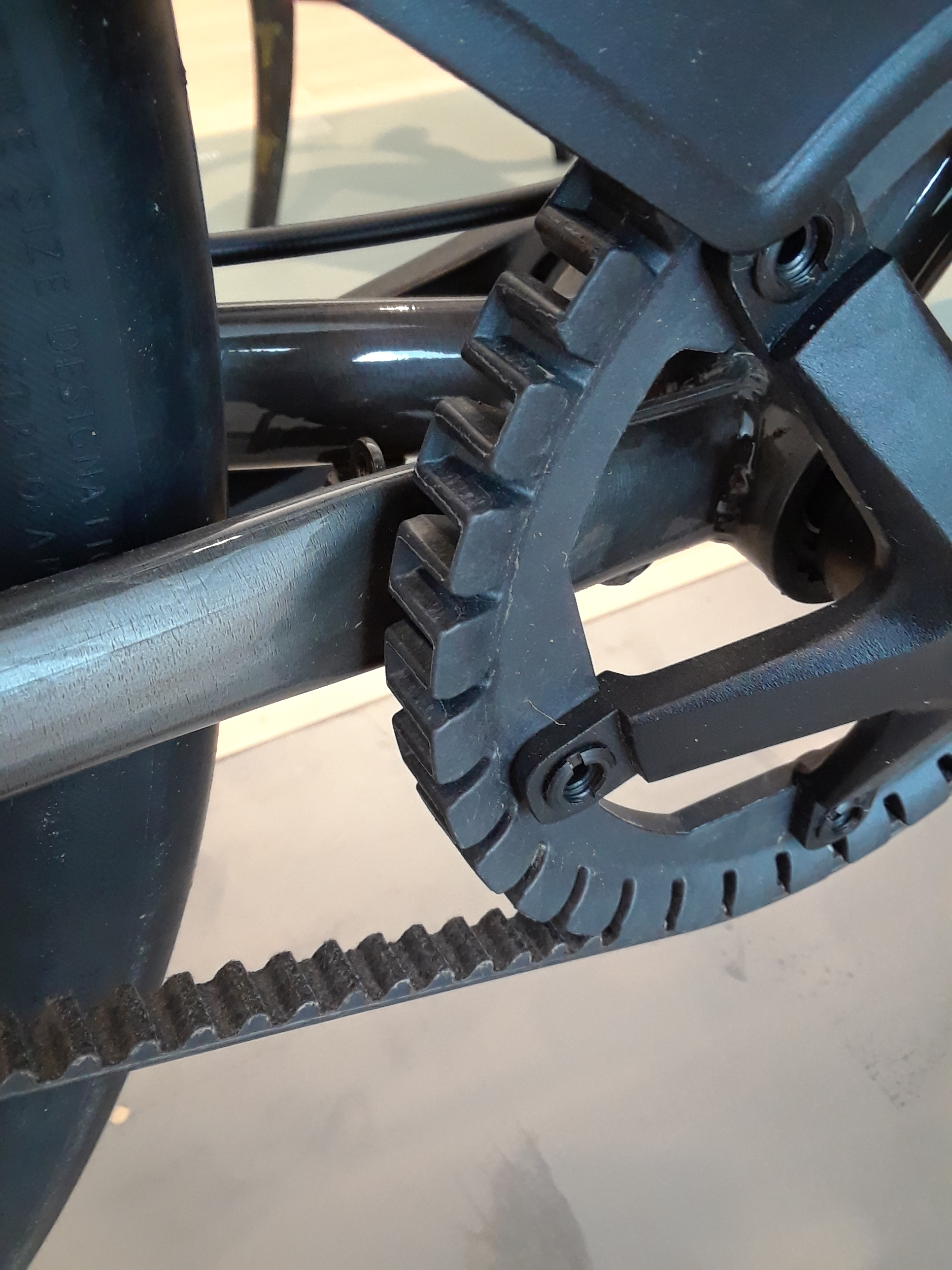
Trek TAB Belt Drive front sprocket rear view

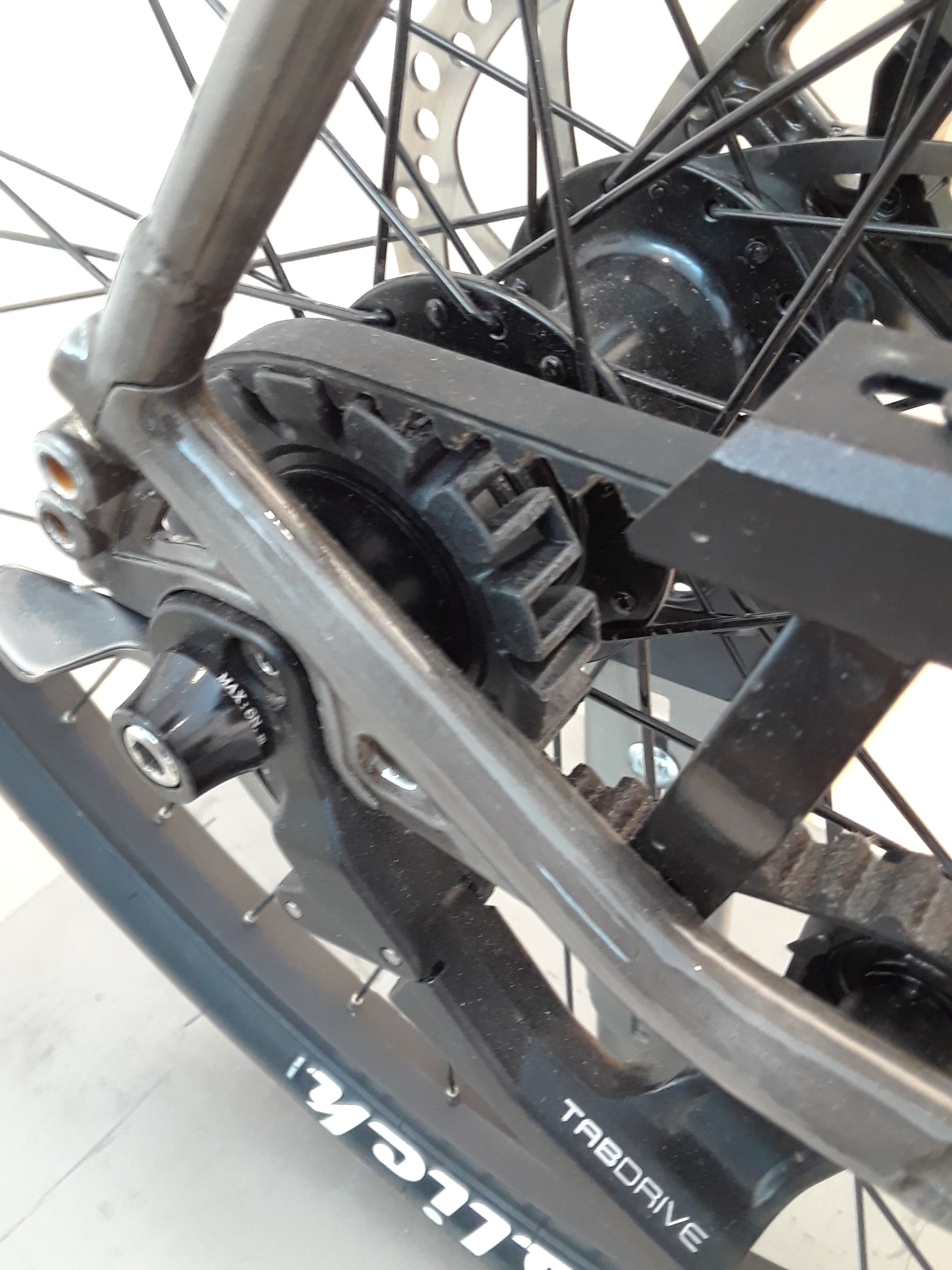
Trek TAB Belt Drive rear sprocket front view

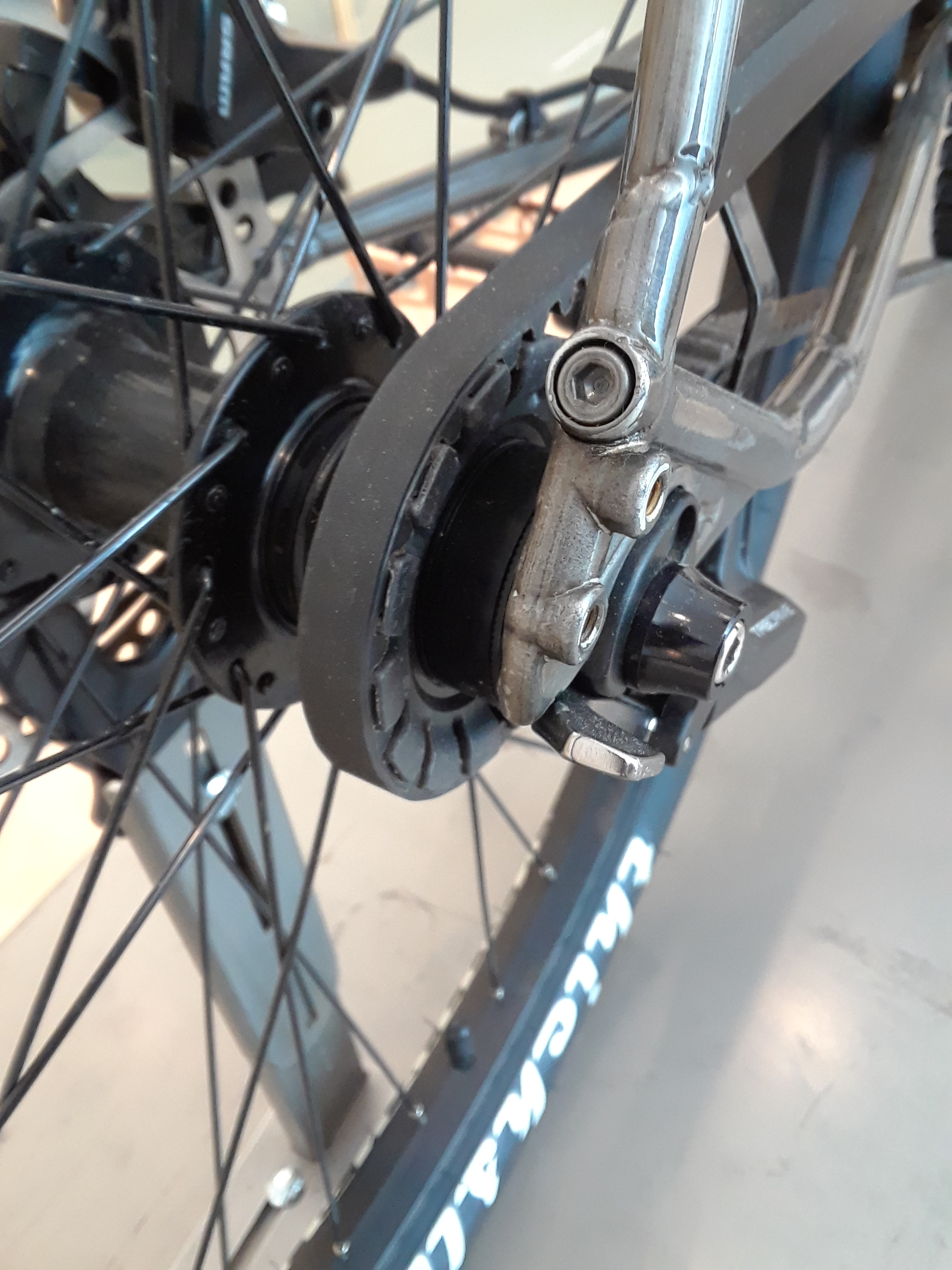
Trek TAB Belt Drive rear sprocket rear view

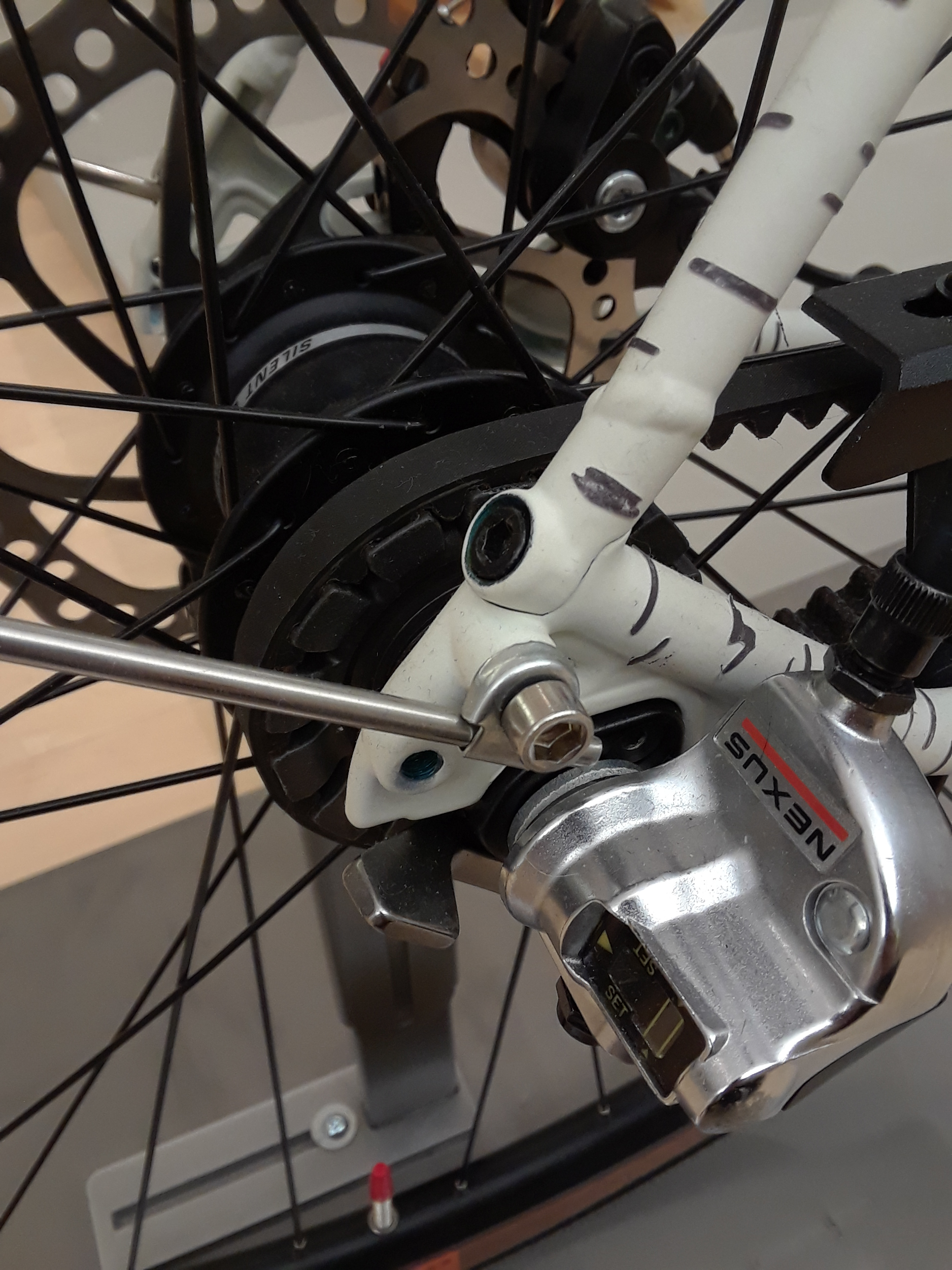
Trek TAB Belt Drive rear sprocket side view with 3-speed hub. The connection point between chainstay and seatstay necessary to insert belt drive is visible.

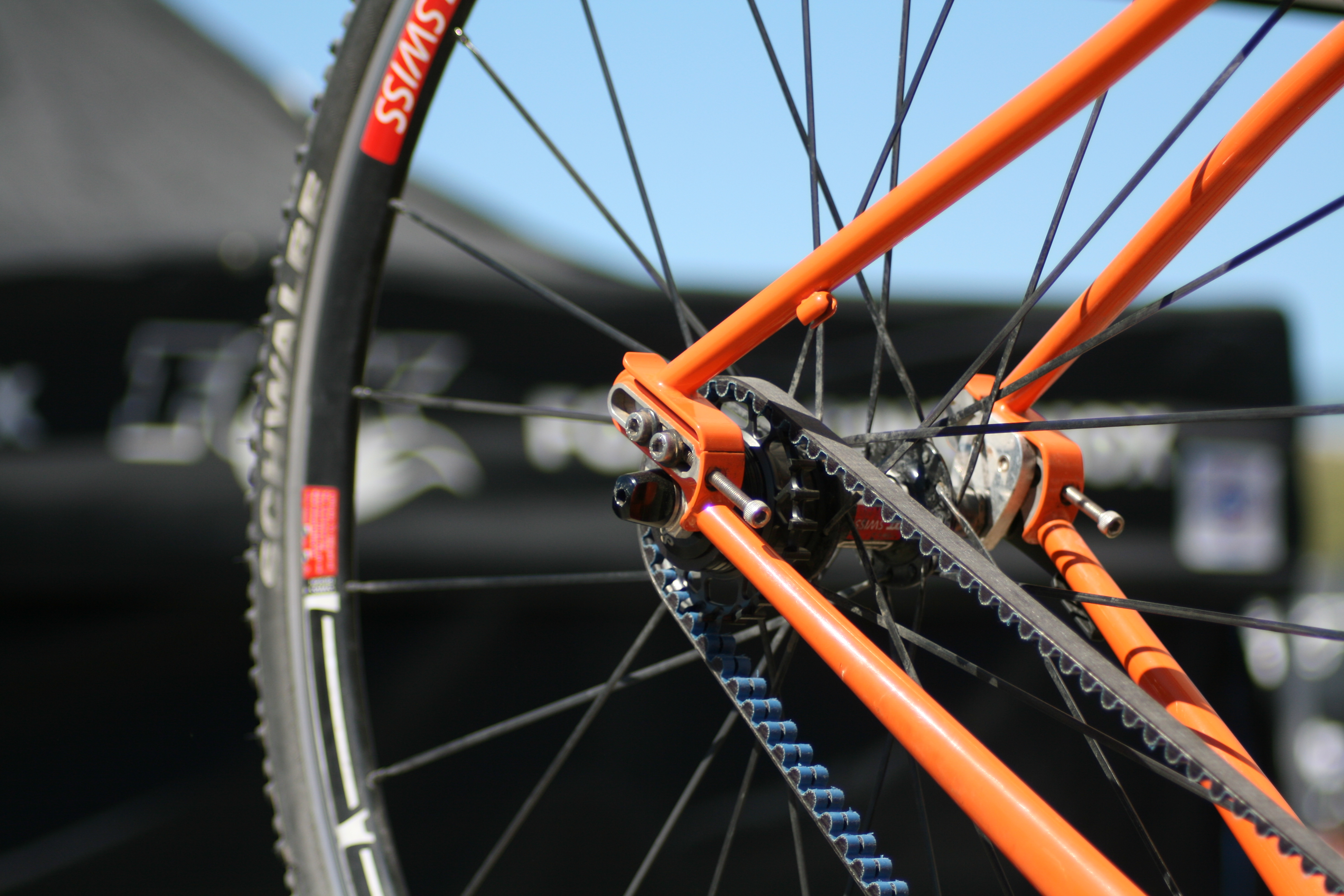
Yet another way to tension the belt by positioning the fork end

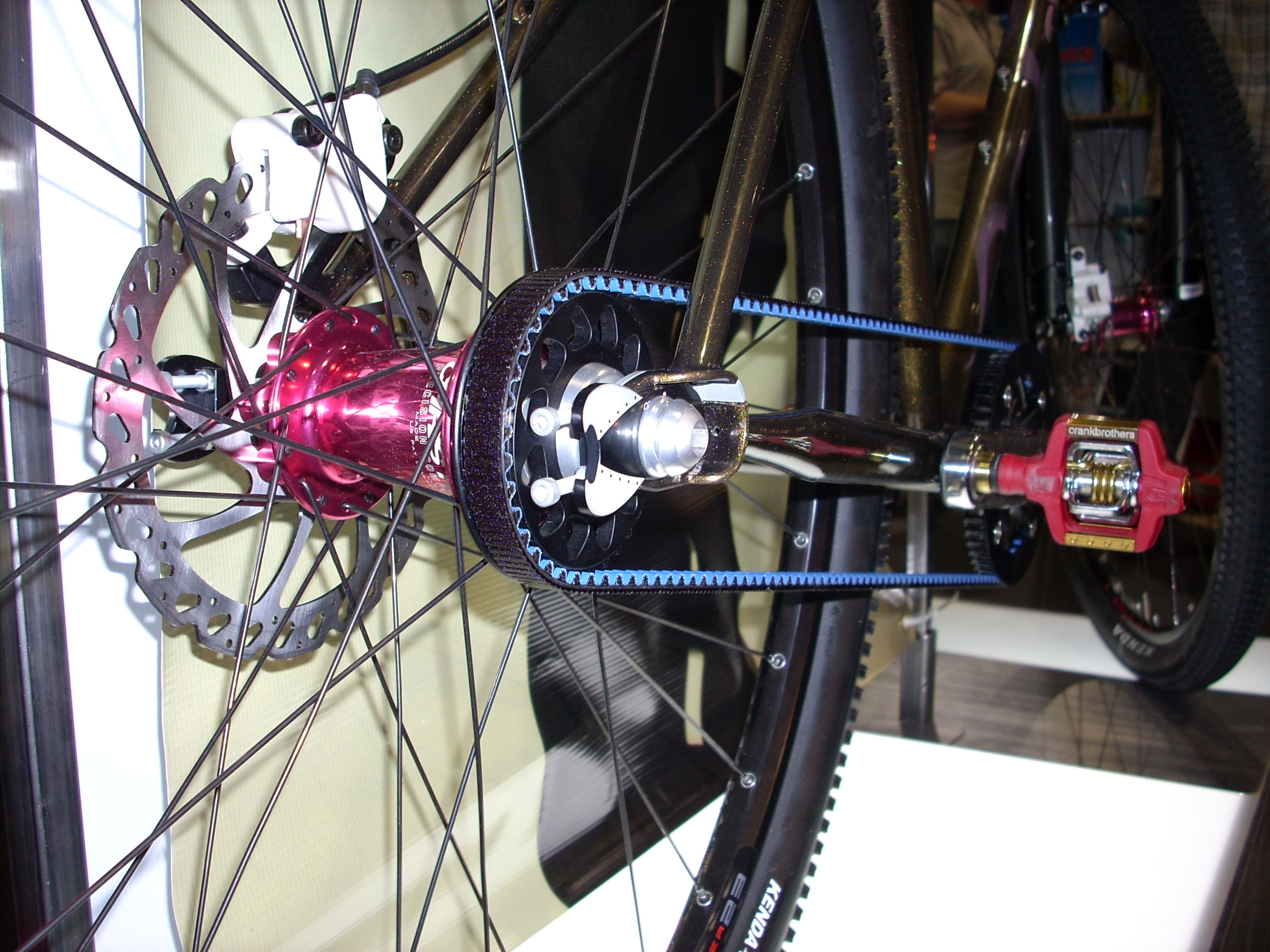
Horizontal fork ends and tugs for providing belt tension

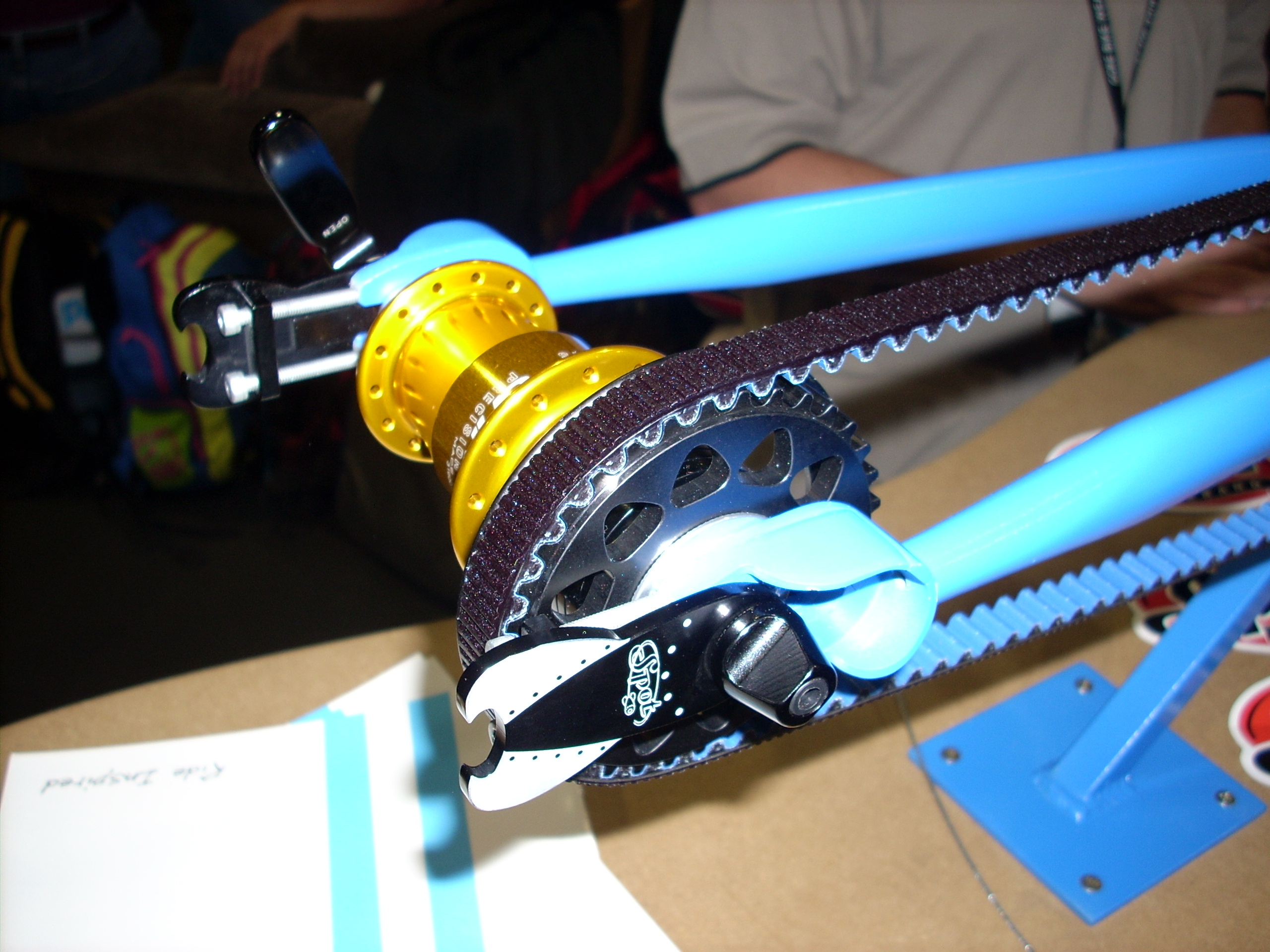
Horizontal fork ends and tugs for providing belt tension (without the wheel, for clarity)

== See also ==
- Chainless bicycle
- Outline of cycling
