= Engine belt =

Engine belt may refer to:

- Serpentine belt, also known as the drive belt or S belt
- Timing belt (camshaft), also known as the cambelt
