= Serpentine belt =

Automotive engine belt

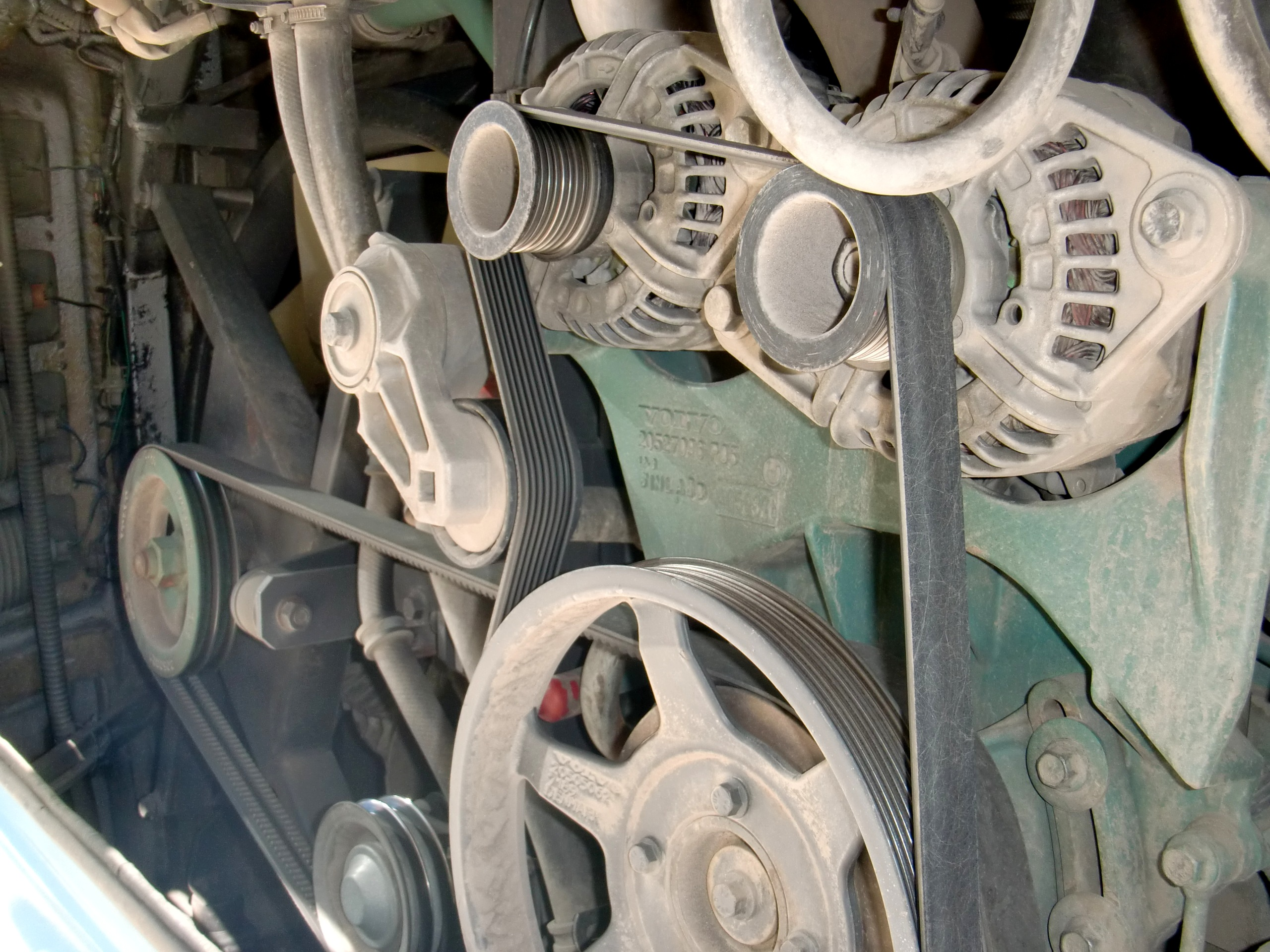
Serpentine belt (foreground) and dual vee belt (background) on a bus engine

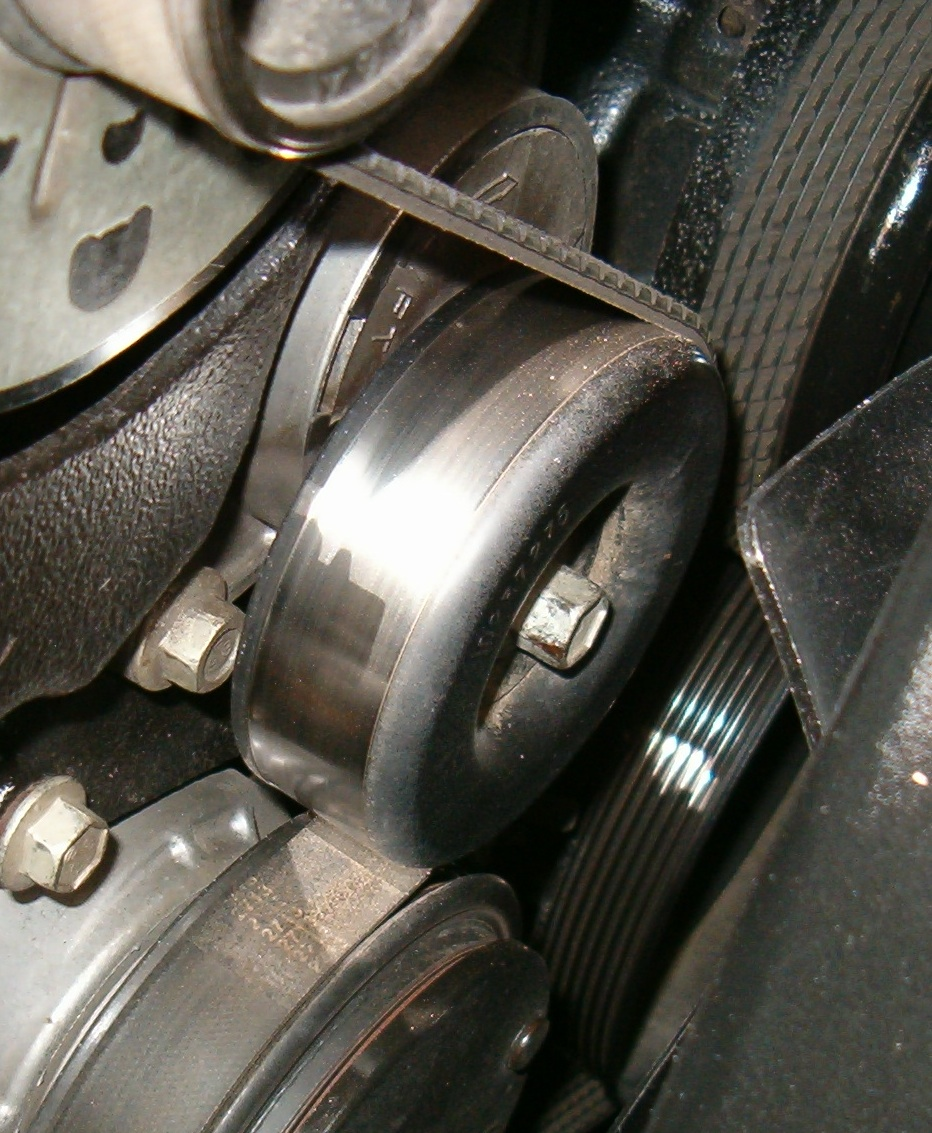
Belt tensioner providing pressure against the back of a serpentine belt in an automobile engine

A serpentine belt (also called drive belt or S belt) is a single, continuous belt used to drive multiple peripheral devices in an automotive engine, such as an alternator, power steering pump, water pump, air conditioning compressor, air pump, etc. The belt may also be guided by an idler pulley and/or a belt tensioner (which may be spring-loaded, hydraulic, or manual). The initial rotation is provided by the crankshaft.

To allow the belt to pass over more than three pulleys with a large enough wrap angle to avoid slipping, idler pulleys which press against the back of the belt are included, forcing the belt into a serpentine shape. To accommodate this bidirectional flexing while remaining strong enough to transfer the total force required by multiple loads, a serpentine belt is almost always of multi-groove (multi-vee, poly-v, or multi-rib) construction.

== Variations ==
On some engine designs, the "back" (smooth side) of the belt may drive some accessories. This is typically limited to components requiring less torque or where a large angle of wrap is present. Such accessories will counter-rotate vs. the "normal" pulleys. Some vehicles use two serpentine belts for their system, such as the manual transaxle equipped Ford Taurus SHO, 1995–1999 DOHC Nissan Maxima, vehicles using the supercharged GM 3800 engine, and many BMWs.

== Advantages ==
It is more efficient than the older multiple belt system and may consume less space in the engine compartment. By using a single, wider belt instead of multiple, thinner belts, the belt may be put under increased tension without stretching. Higher tension reduces slip, which increases belt life and mechanical efficiency. Reduced slip can allow the use of lower-ratio pulleys; this reduces the load on the engine, increasing fuel economy and available power. The tendency for V-belts to "flip over" in the pulley groove (at high RPM and/or when the belt stretches) is eliminated, and a serpentine belt is also much easier to maintain and replace, since there is no need to remove multiple belts in order to replace one of them, although newer adjustable-length V-belts ("link belts") can be put on without having to remove other belts, and their link design also allows a self-tensioning characteristic to reduce the risk of flipping over. Also since only one movable belt tensioner is required all of the peripheral components (alternator, A/C compressor, etc.) can simply be mounted to the engine without the need to swivel.

== Disadvantages ==
The drawback of this single belt is that if the belt breaks or is knocked loose, the vehicle instantly loses multiple critical functions. The water pump, power steering pump, and alternator (for battery charging) would cease functioning. The vehicle becomes quickly unusable due to loss of engine cooling. The belt typically gives ample visual warning of impending failure, sometimes even totally shedding several grooves (ribs) while continuing to function acceptably.

Furthermore, the loss of function of a single component (such as a power steering pump or air conditioning compressor) causes the failure of the entire accessory drive. Sometimes, this can be overcome with a shorter belt to bypass the failed components (if the belt is available). But this is not always possible. Thus, it is possible to be stranded because of, say, a seized power steering pump or A/C compressor clutch. It may also not be possible to restore use of the vehicle without first repairing the bad power steering pump or A/C compressor, which precludes a simple roadside repair.

== See also ==
- Timing belt
