= Priority Bicycles =

American bicycle manufacturer

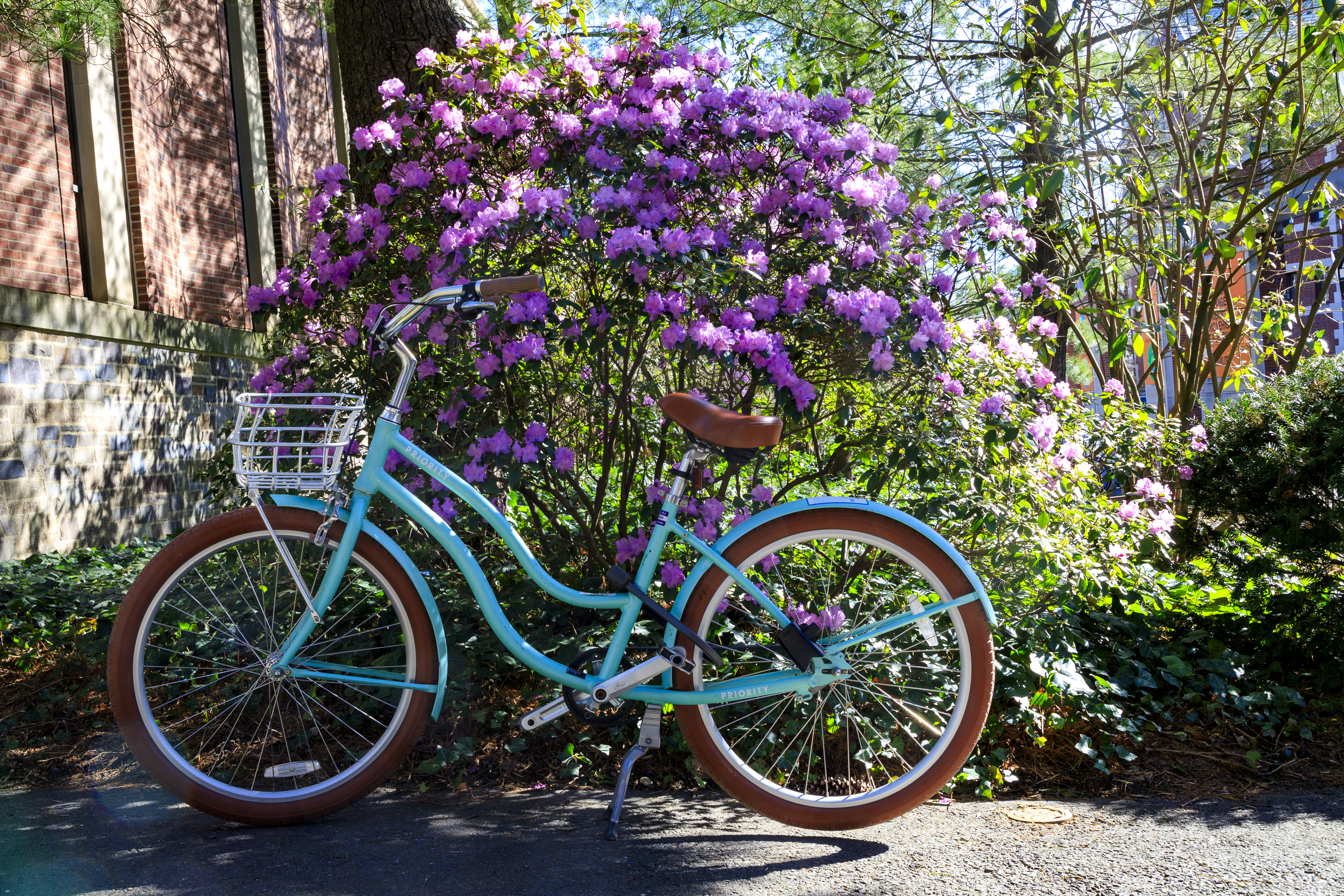
- Company type: Bicycle
- Founded: 2012
- Founder: Dave Weiner
- Headquarters: New York
- Website: prioritybicycles.com

Priority Bicycles is an American bicycle manufacturer based in New York City.

The company was founded in 2012 by Dave Weiner, who quit his job as North American CEO of a mystery software company to start a bicycle company. Weiner crowdfunded the startup company with a Kickstarter campaign in July 2014, with users who donated $350 promised a bicycle from the first shipment, and reached his funding goal of $30,000 within hours of launching. By the end of the 30-day campaign, Priority had received $556,286 of startup capital.

The bicycles are aimed at commuters, and are designed to minimize maintenance requirements by using a belt drive rather than a bicycle chain, and puncture-resistant tires with double-wall rims.

The main office is located in New York where the design, painting, and assembly of the bicycles is carried out, while the frames are manufactured in China.
