= Tensioner =

Device that creates or maintains tension

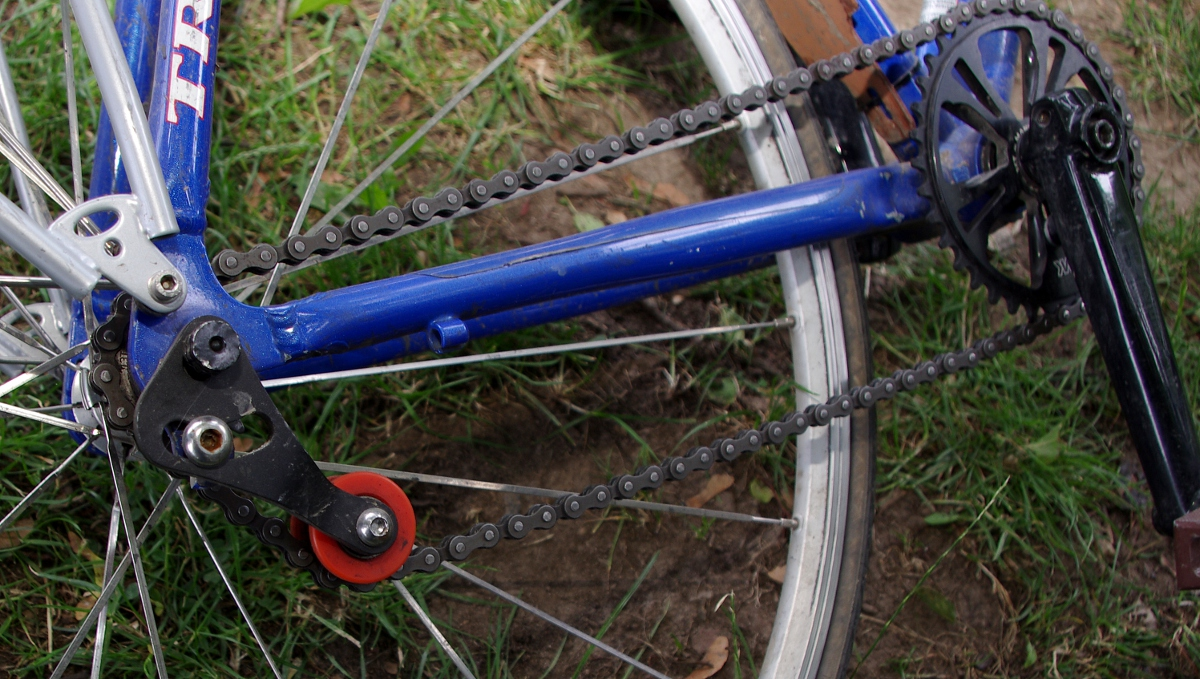
Chain tensioner on a single-speed bicycle

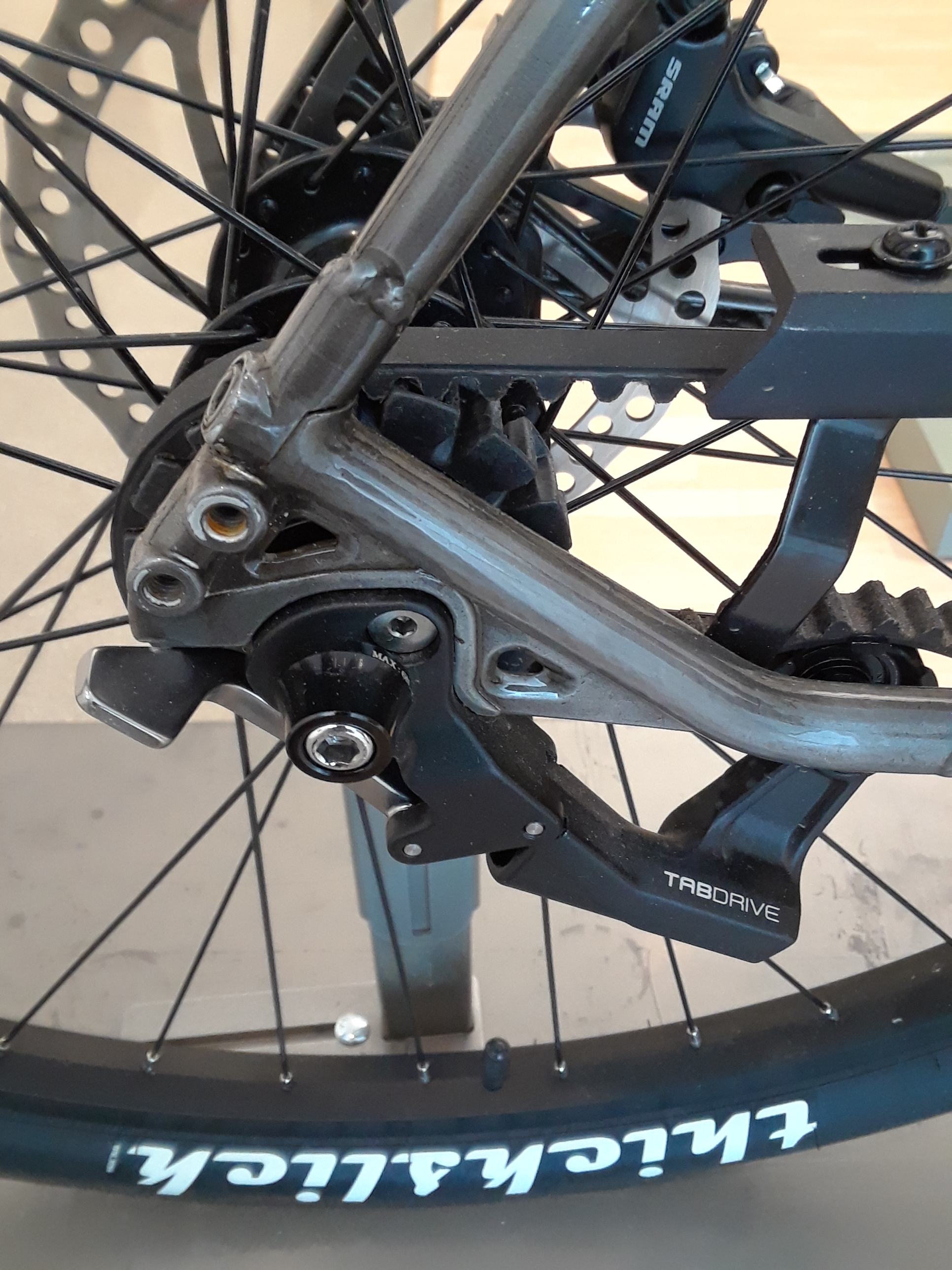
Belt tensioner on a belt-drive bicycle

A tensioner is a device that applies a force to create or maintain tension. The force may be applied parallel to, as in the case of a hydraulic bolt tensioner, or perpendicular to, as in the case of a spring-loaded bicycle chain tensioner, the tension it creates. The force may be generated by a fixed displacement, as in the case of an eccentric bicycle bottom bracket, which must be adjusted as parts wear, or by stretching or compressing a spring, as in the case of a spring-loaded bicycle chain tensioner; by changing the volume of a gas, as in the case of a marine riser tensioner; by hydraulic pressure, as in the case of a hydraulic bolt tensioner; or by gravity acting on a suspended mass, as in the case of a chair lift cable tensioner.

== Applications ==
- Bolt tensioners are devices designed to apply a specific tension to a bolt. The device may be either removed once the actual nut is threaded into place or left in place, in the case of a hydraulic nut.
- The belt or chain tension on a single-speed bicycle can be maintained by either setting the fixed horizontal position of the rear sprocket or the front chainring horizontally, or by a separate tensioner that pushes perpendicular to the chain with either a fixed position or spring tension.
- The serpentine belt and the timing belt or chain on an automobile engine may be guided by an idler pulley and/or a belt tensioner, which may be spring-loaded, hydraulic, or fixed.
- The chain tension of a chainsaw may be adjusted with a chain tensioner.
- A marine riser tensioner is a device used on an offshore drilling vessel that provides a near-constant upward force on the drilling riser independent of the movement of the floating drill vessel.
- A guideline tensioner is a hydropneumatic device used on an offshore drilling rig that keeps a positive pulling force on the guidelines from the platform to a template on the seabed.
- Overhead electrical wires may be kept in tension by springs or weights.
- Conveyor belts
- Chair lift and gondola lift cables
- Certain wood trusses, such as the beam tensioner truss picture below.
- Fencing made of wire, such as electric fences, barbed-wire fences, and chainlink fences often include tensioning devices to keep them taut.
- Belt sanders have a mechanism, often a spring-loaded idler drum, to apply the proper tension to the sanding belt, which can be released to allow for changing belts.

== Gallery ==
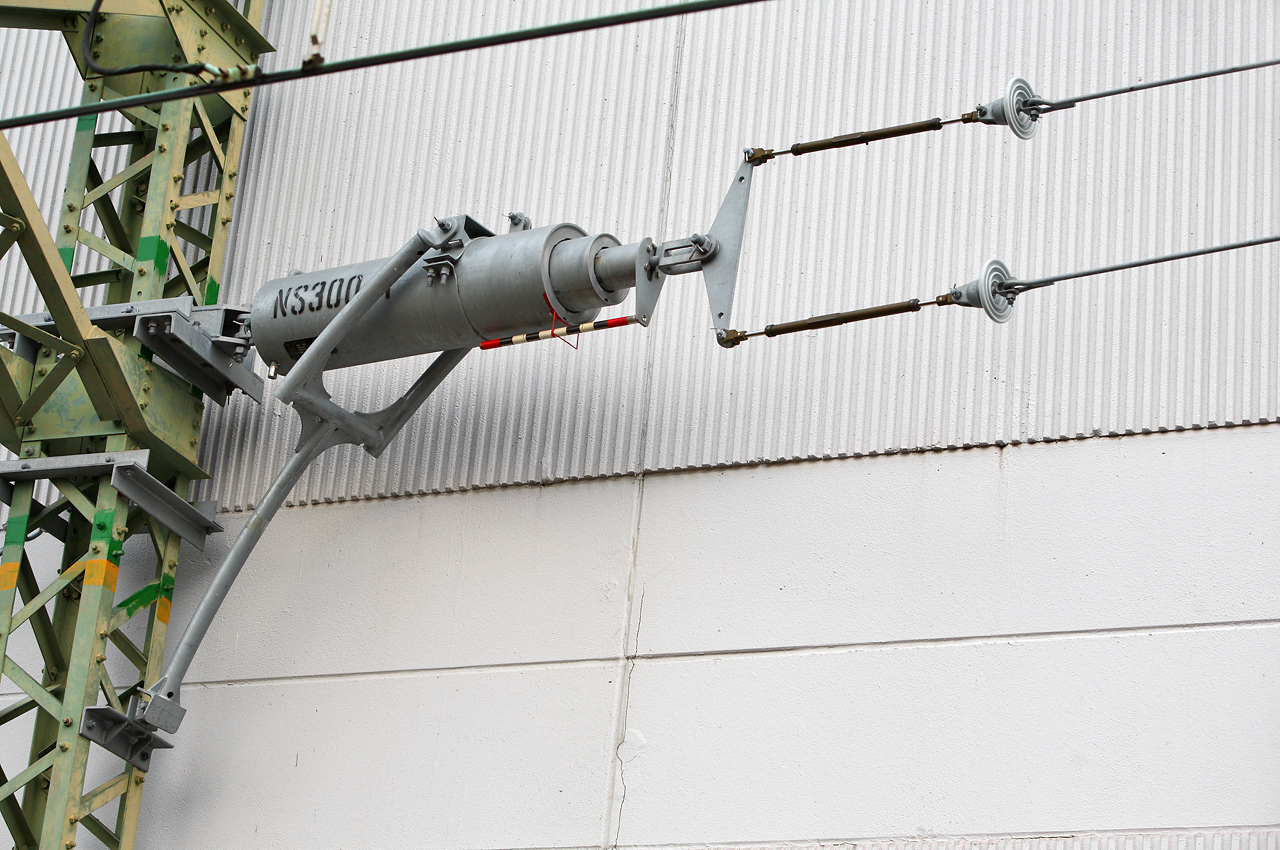
Spring-loaded overhead line tensioner

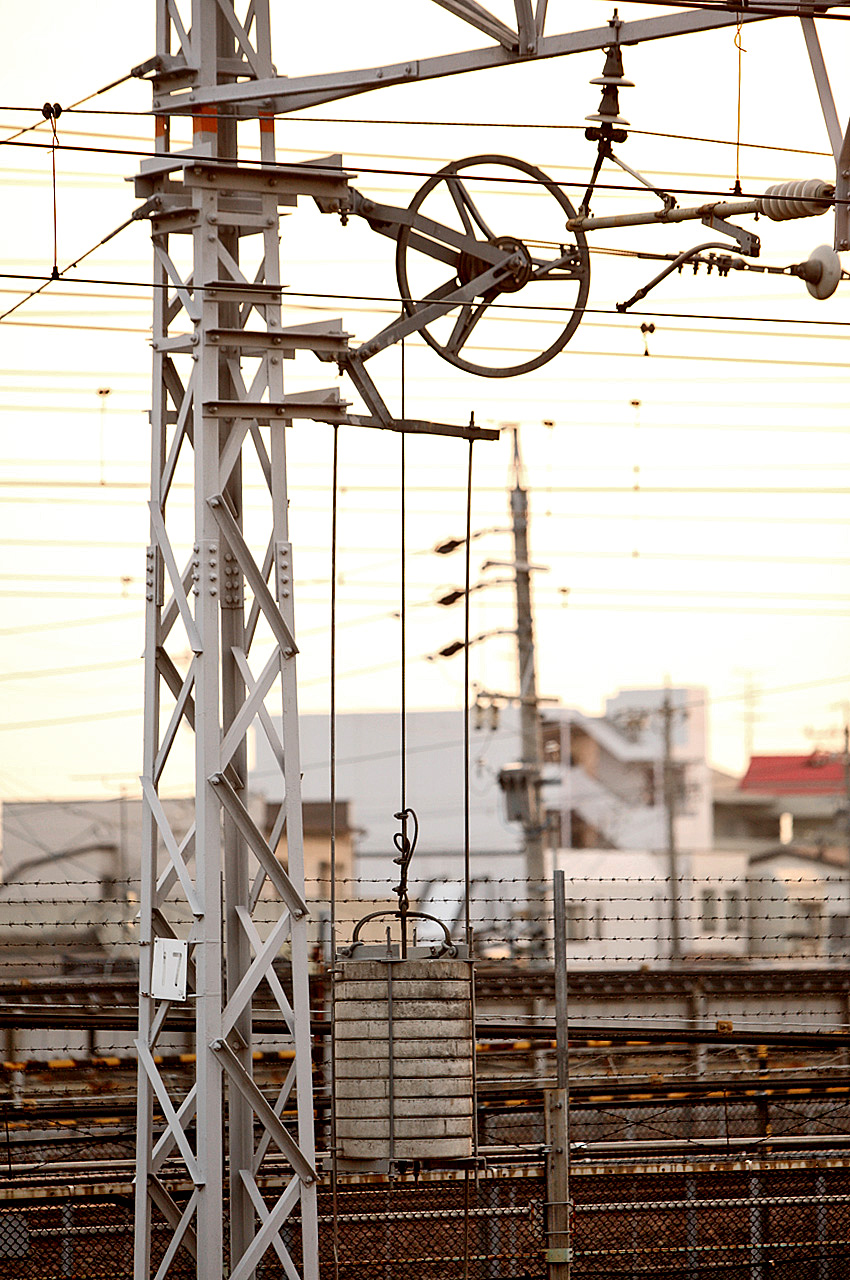
Gravity overhead line tensioner

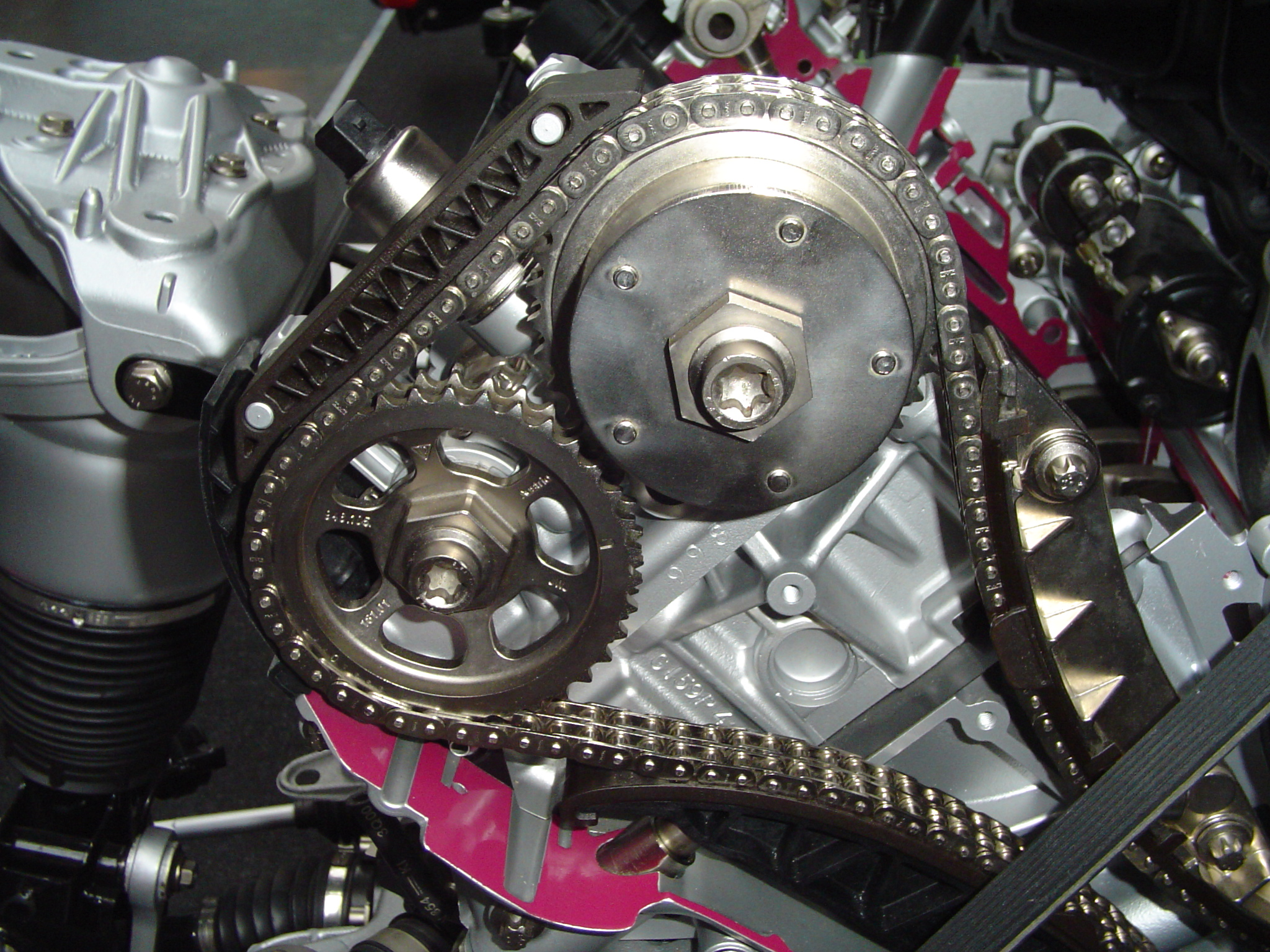
Chain tensioner in an automobile engine

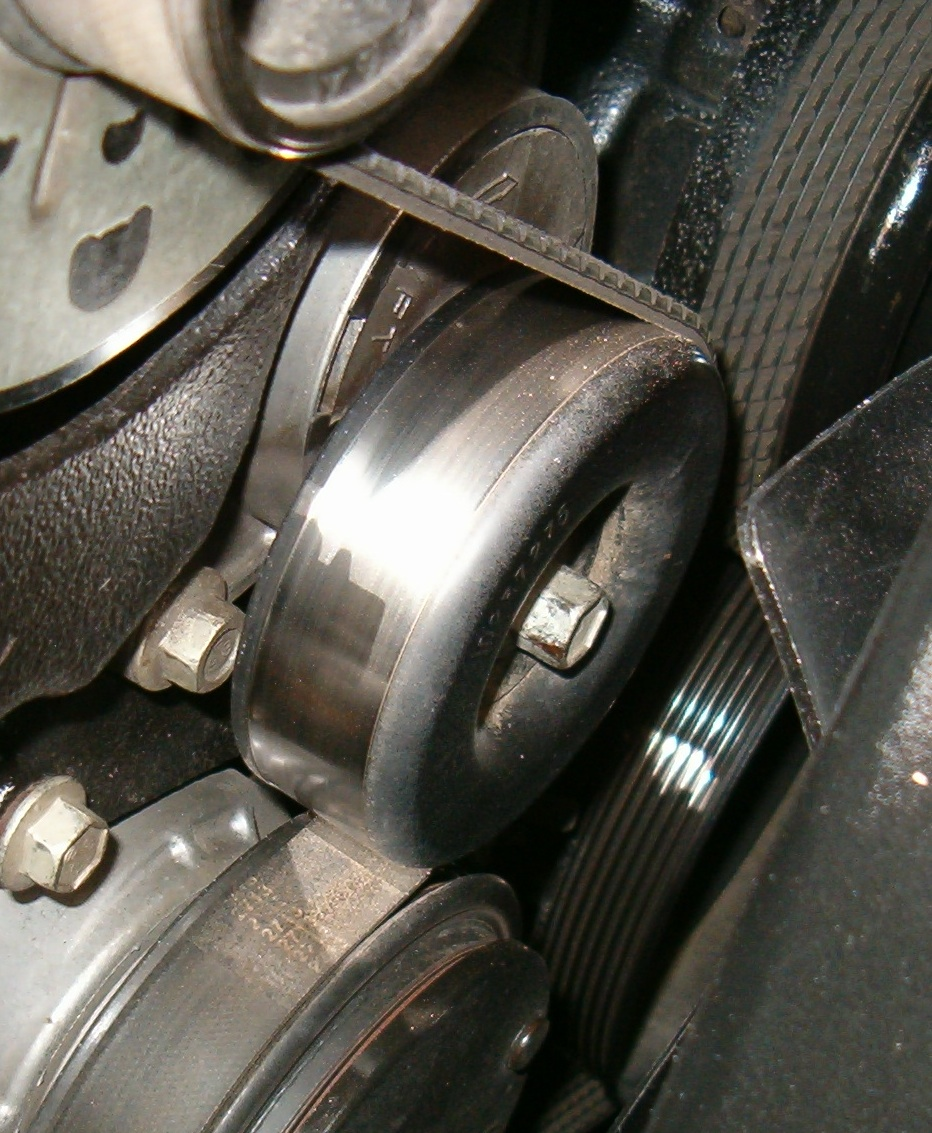
Serpentine belt on belt tensioner in an automobile engine

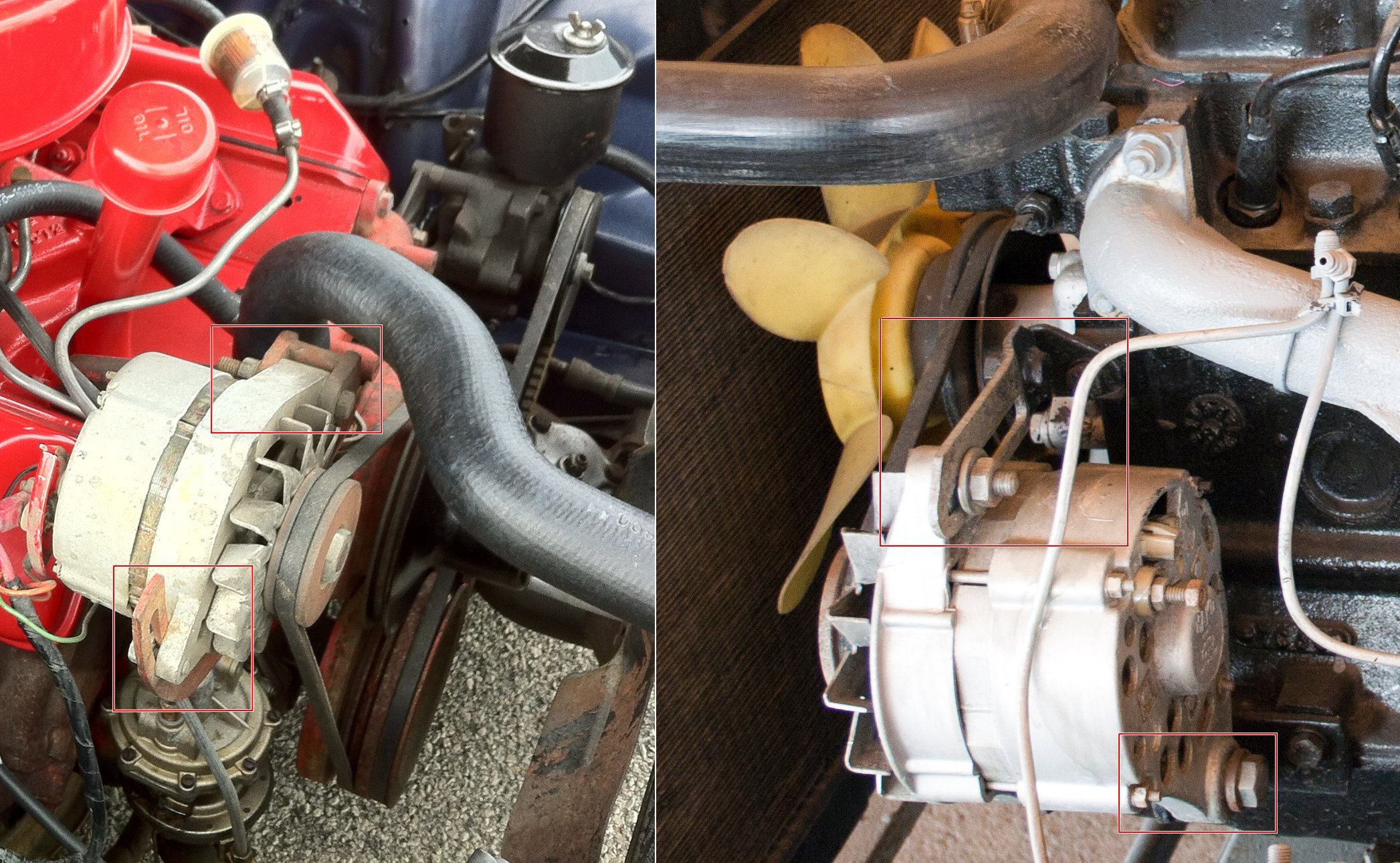
Adjustable, fixed-position belt tensioner in an automobile engine

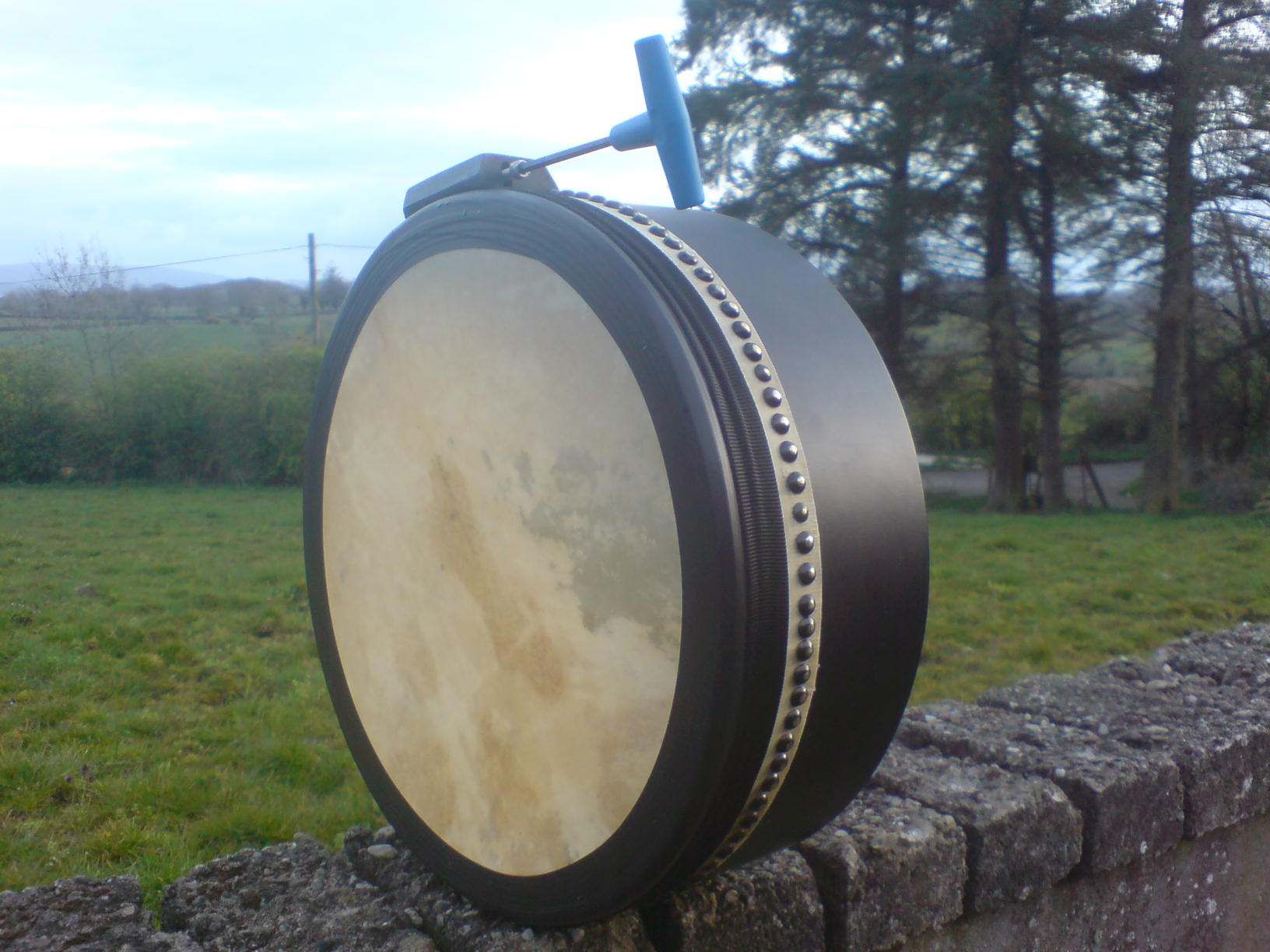
Drum tensioner

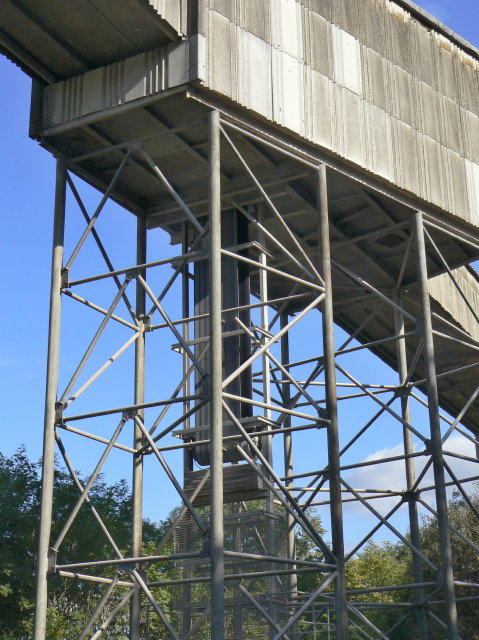
Conveyor belt tensioner

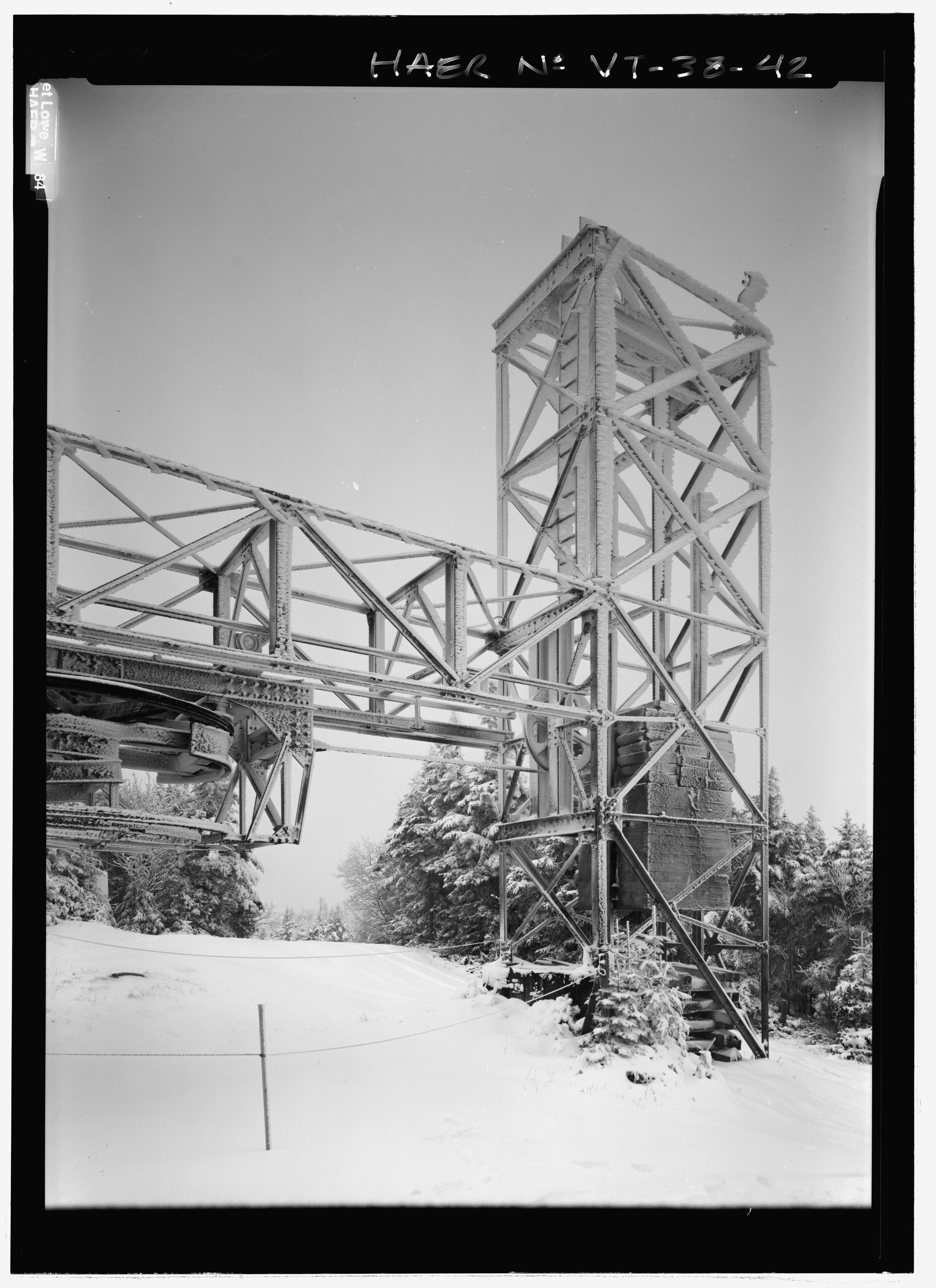
Chair lift cable tensioner

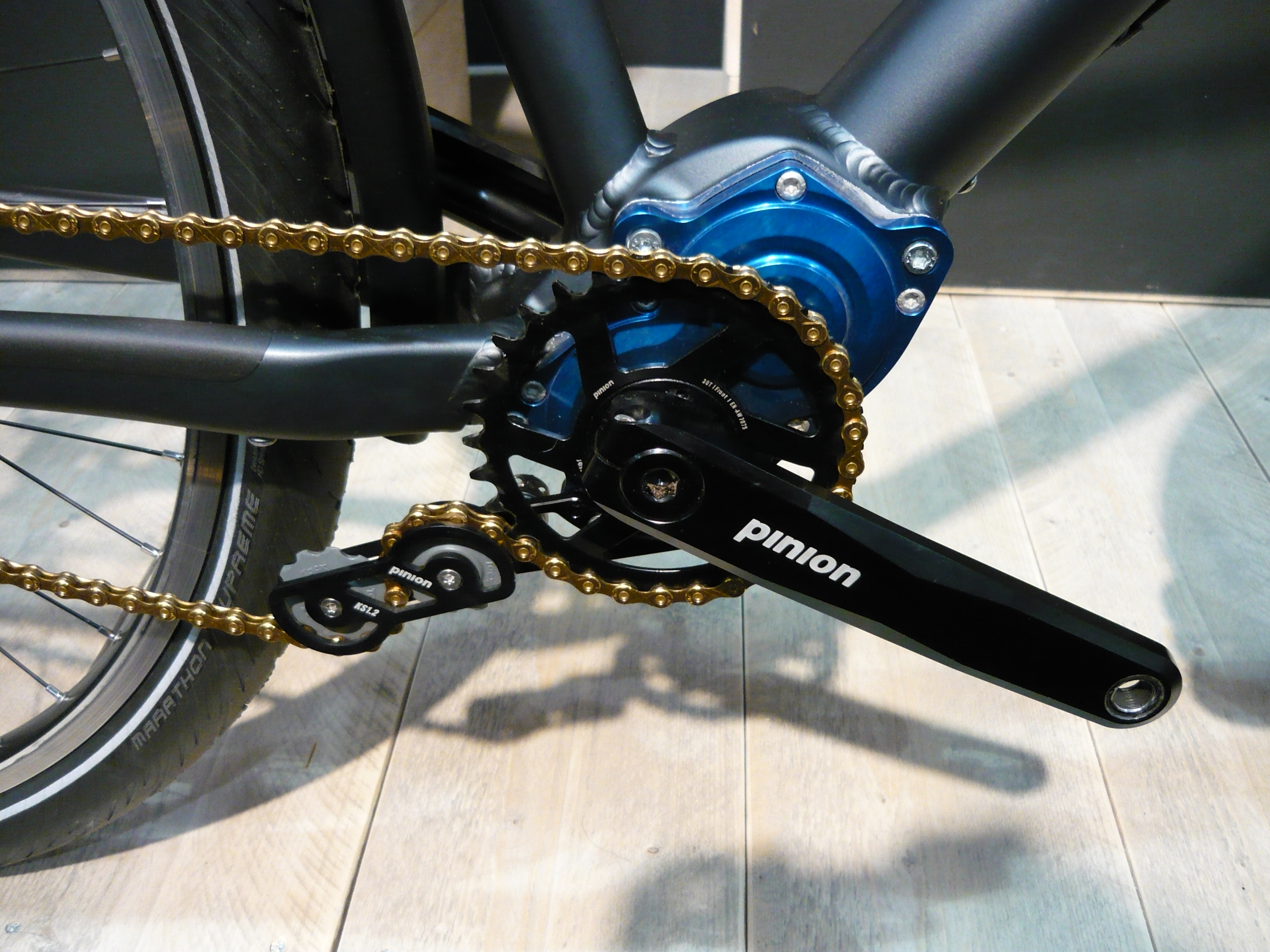
Chain tensioner for a bicycle with an internal gearbox

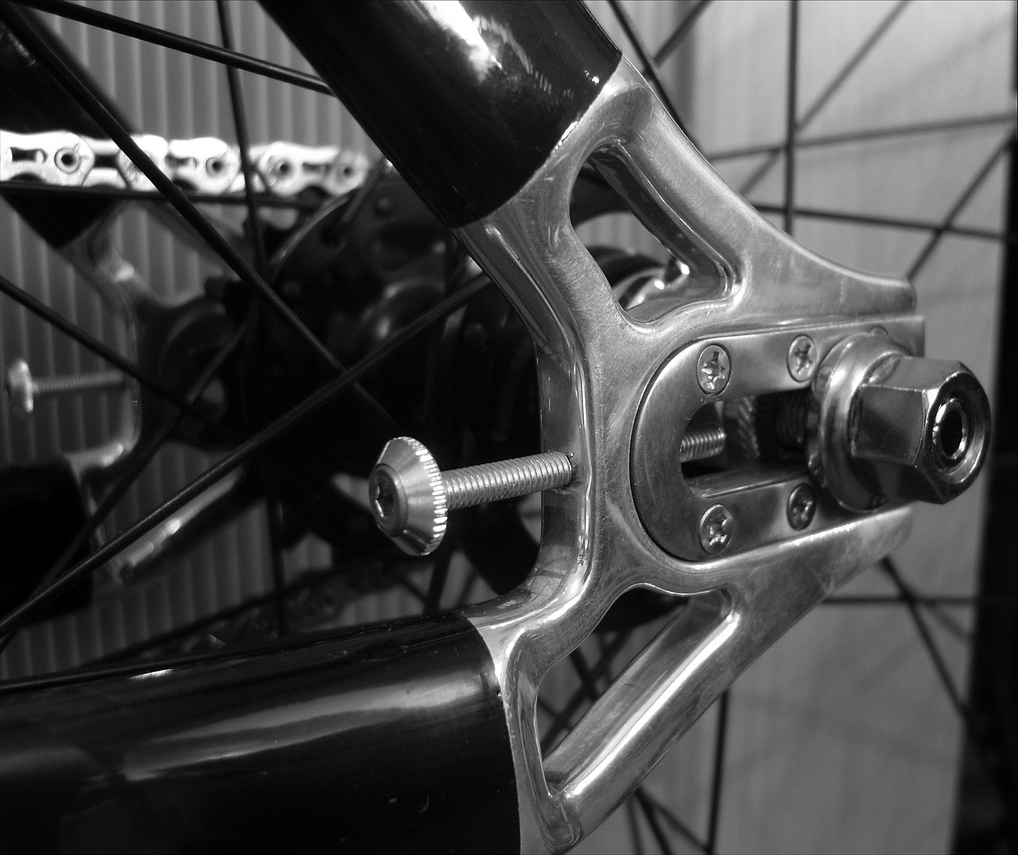
Chain tensioner for a single-speed bicycle

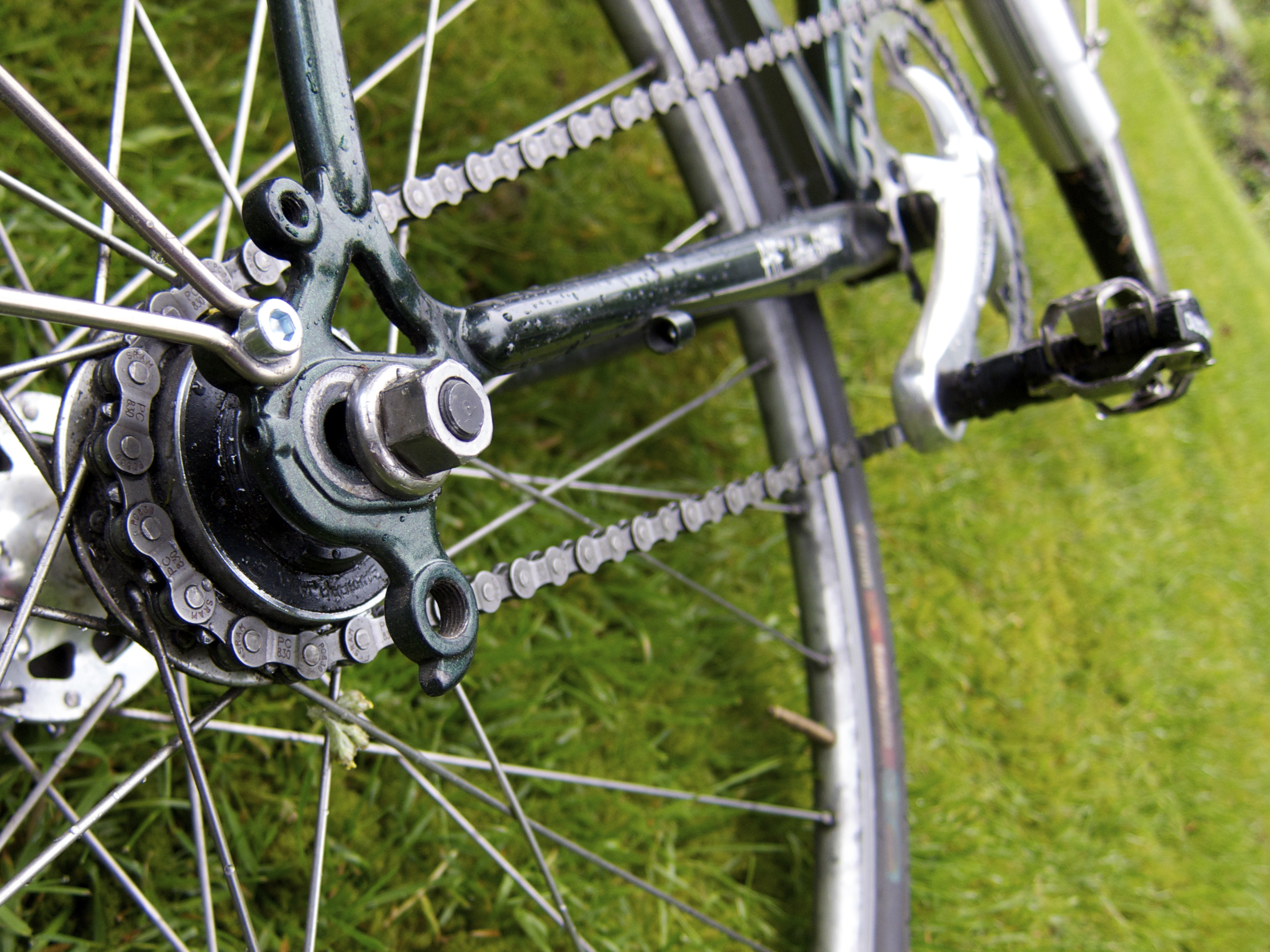
Bicycle chain tensioned without a dedicated tensioner mechanism

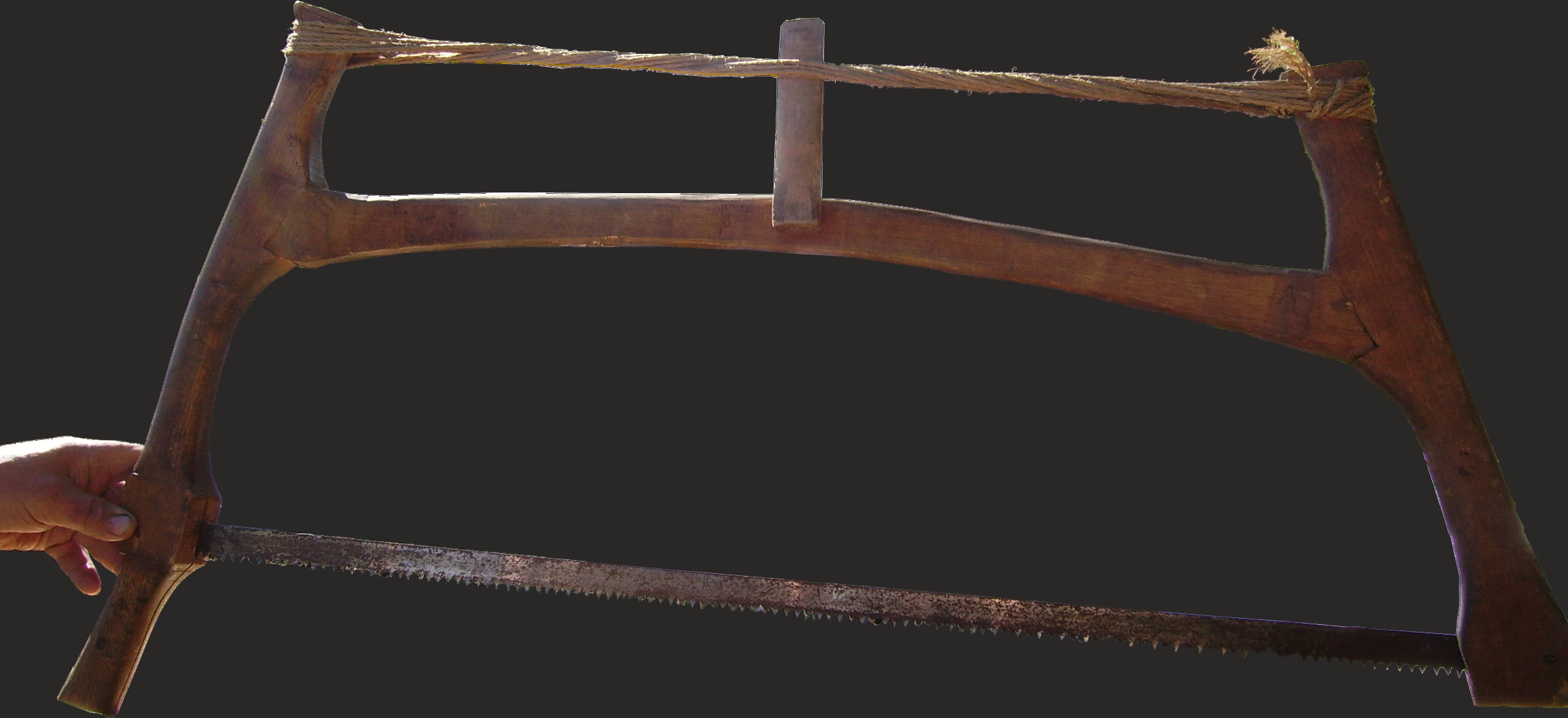
Traditional Finnish frame saw with wooden frame, loggers' tool before cross-cut and chain saws till 1960s

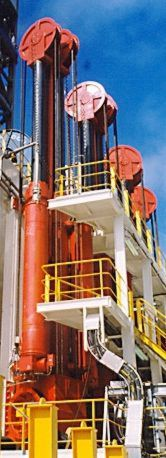
Marine riser tensioner

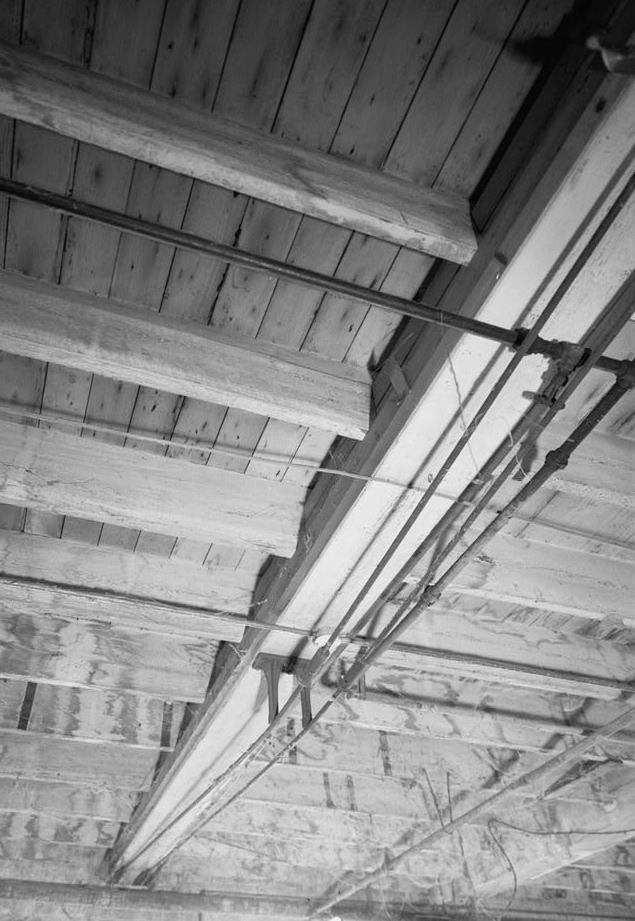
Beam tensioner truss

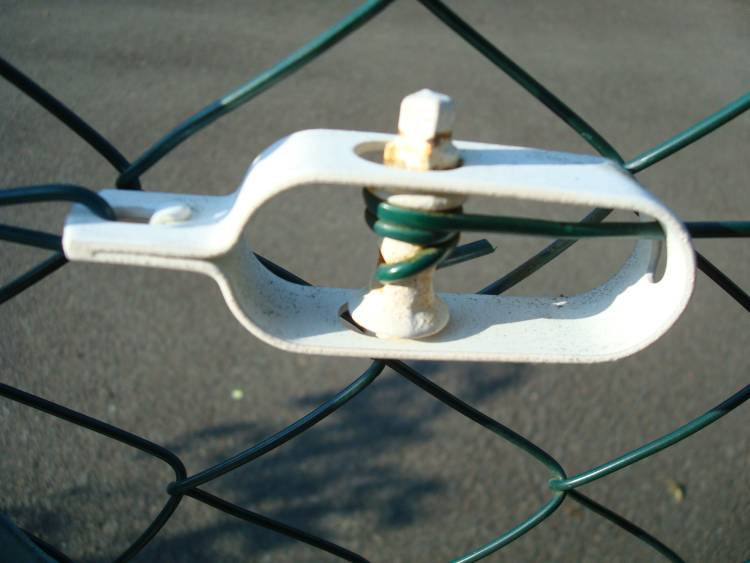
Chainlink fence tensioner

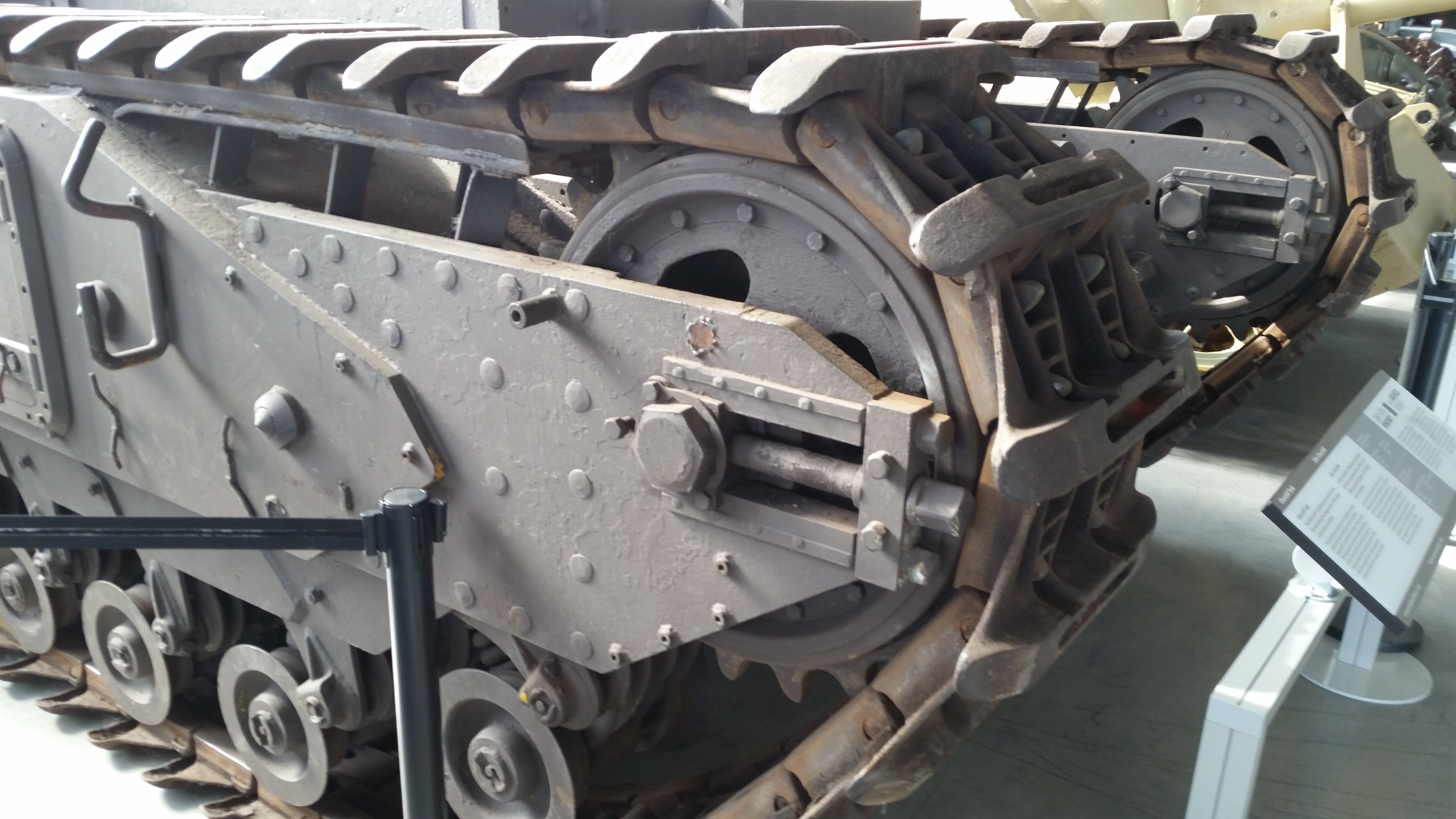
Track tensioner on a Churchill Tank

== See also ==
- Turnbuckle
- Torque wrench
