= Yadea =

Chinese electric vehicle manufacturer

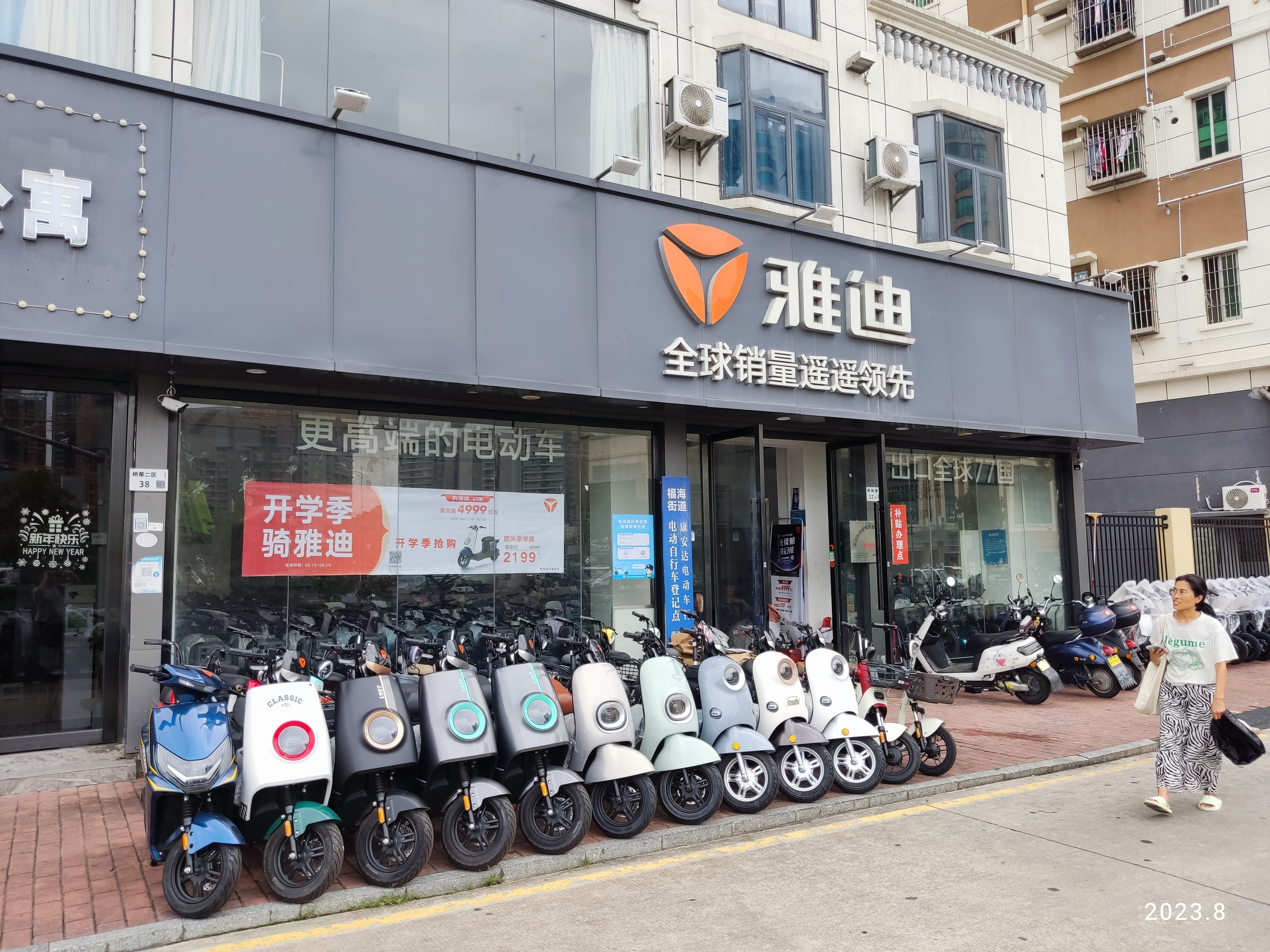
- A retail store in Shenzhen.
- Type: Holding company
- Founded: 1997; 29 years ago as Bauhinia; 2001; 25 years ago as Yadea
- Headquarters: Wuxi, Jiangsu, China
- Key people: Dong Jinggui (Chairman of the Board), Qian Jinghong (CEO), Wang Jiazhuang (President)
- Products: Electric bicycles; Electric motorcycles and scooters
- Net income: ▲HKD 2.16 billion (2022)
- Total assets: ▲HKD 24.95 billion (2022)
- Number of employees: 11.83 thousand (2022)
- Website: www.yadea.com

Yadea Group Holdings Ltd. (Chinese: 雅迪科技集团有限公司; pinyin: Yǎdí Kējì Jítuán Yǒuxiàn Gōngsī) is a Chinese manufacturer of electric bicycles, motorcycles, and scooters headquartered in Wuxi, China. The company owns seven production sites in China, in Wuxi, Tianjin, Cixi and Qingyuan, with development in Shanghai and Wuxi as well. In 2019 it started a production in Vietnam.

== History ==
Yadea was established in 1997 as a Bauhinia. In 1998, Dong Jinggui and his wife began to engage in the wholesale and retail of motorcycle parts. Later, he switched to motorcycle vehicle business. Started producing motorcycles in 2000. In 2001, Yadi Technology Group Co., Ltd. ('Yadi Technology Group) was established. In 2004, he switched to making electric vehicles, with the brand name "Yadea". On May 19, 2016, Yadea Group Holdings Limited was listed in Hong Kong.

In 2020, the company was ranked second worldwide with 6 million two-wheelers sold. The company is the world's largest manufacturer of electric scooters and has around 340 employees that work in development. In 2021, Yadea presented its own graphene batteries that also work at temperatures of −20 °C. Also in 2021, Yadea presented four e-scooters in Germany, with the C-Umi reminiscent of the Vespa, and for the Yadea C1S they collaborated with Austrian design agency, KISKA GmbH, and the G5 with higher-quality equipment.

In 2022, Yadea held over 1300 patents. At the end of 2022, the Volt Guard VFV, another e-scooter and an electric light motorcycle Keenness VFD were presented at the EICMA; the latter delivers 10 kW (14 hp) and has a torque of 280 Nm.

After appearing at Eurobike in 2022, Yadea launched its US market entry at the Consumer Electronics Show (CES), in 2023. In mid-2023, Yadea and Porsche presented the VF F200 e-scooter, the design of which was created in collaboration with the Porsche Design Center. So far, Yadea sells in 80 countries; over 95 percent (5.7 million) of vehicles, including e-bikes, are sold in China. At the end of 2023 Yadea presented the electric motorbike Kemper.

== Gallery ==
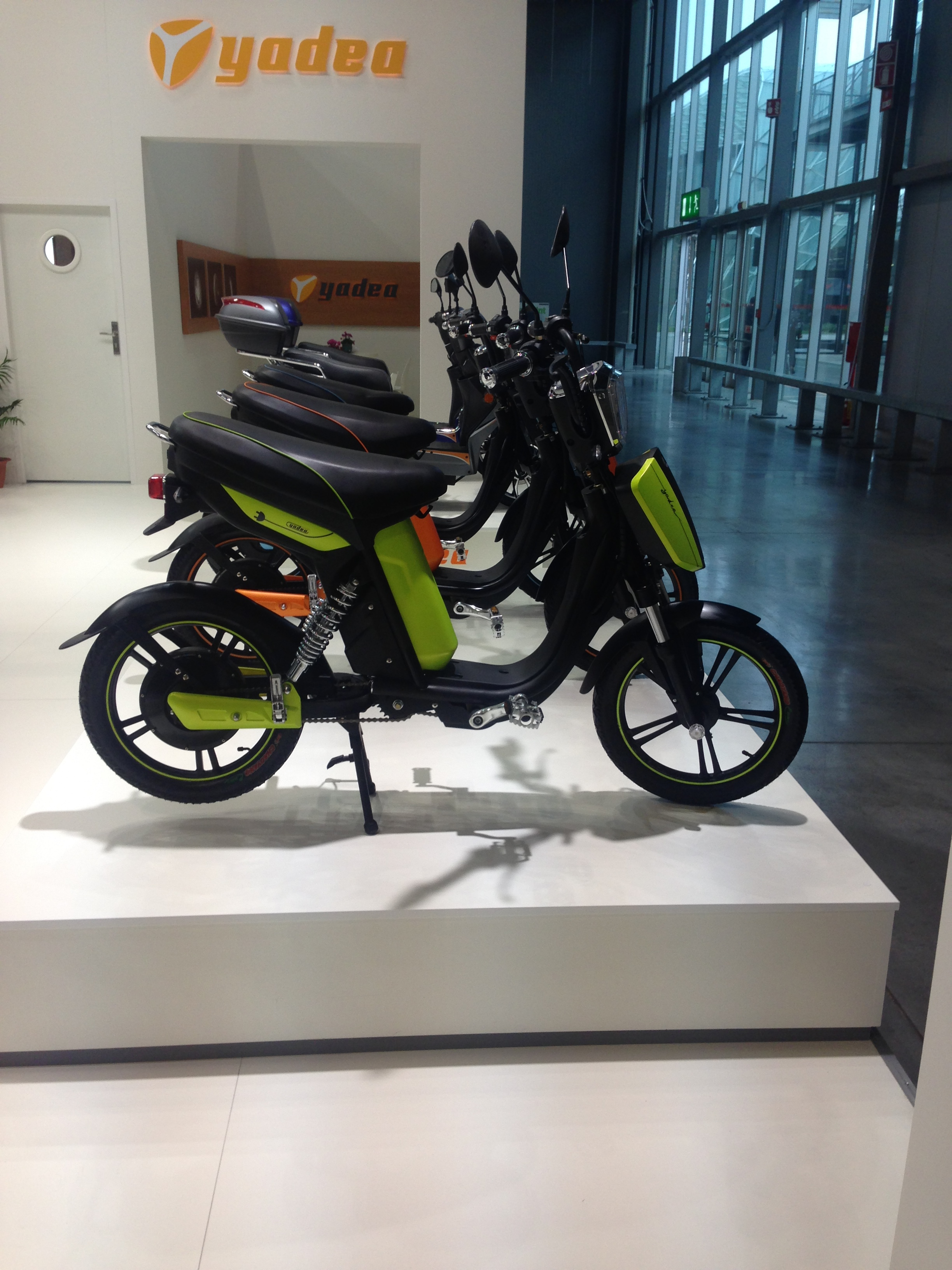
Yadea Roller, EICMA 2015

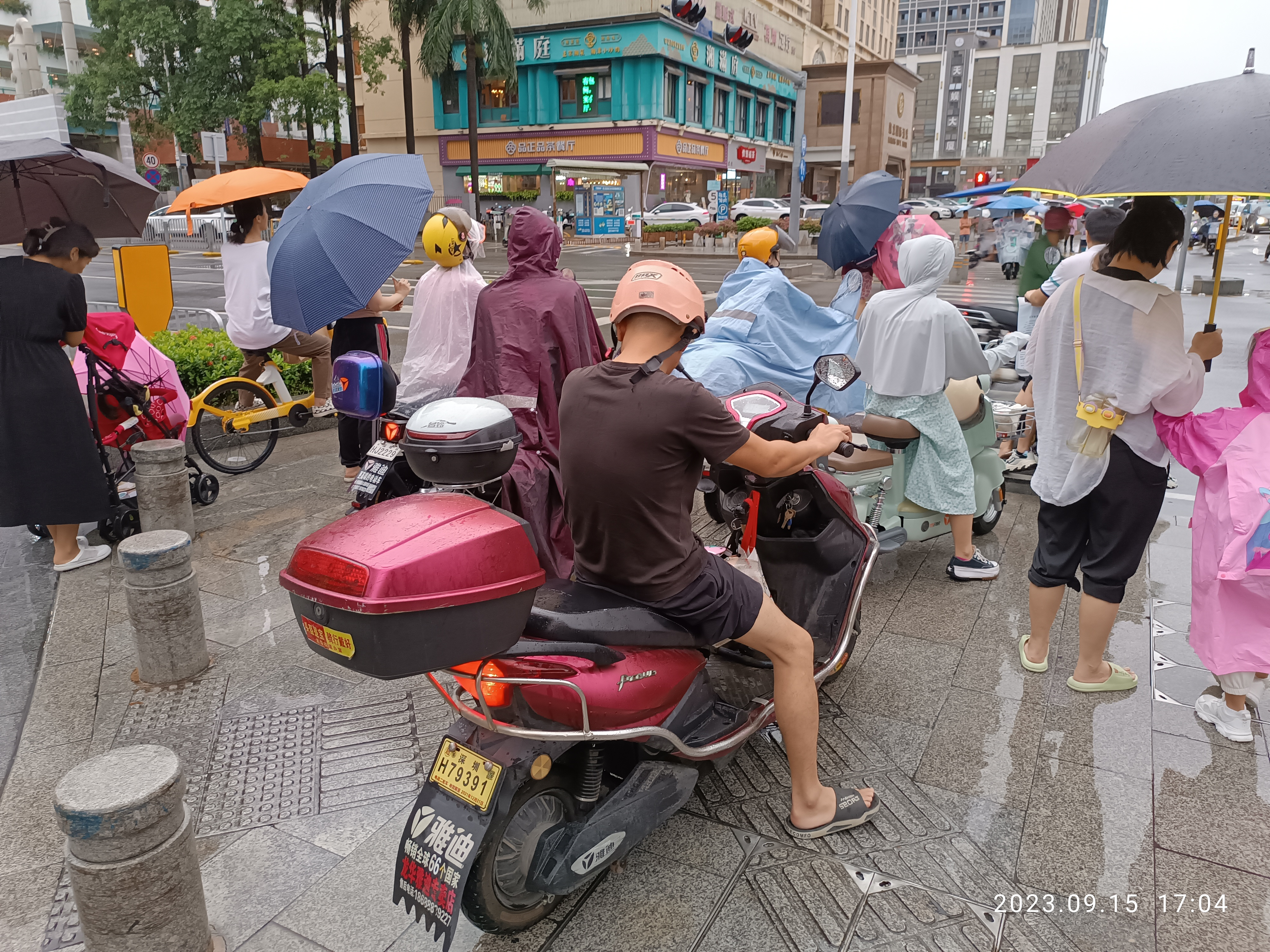
Different models being ridden by customers.

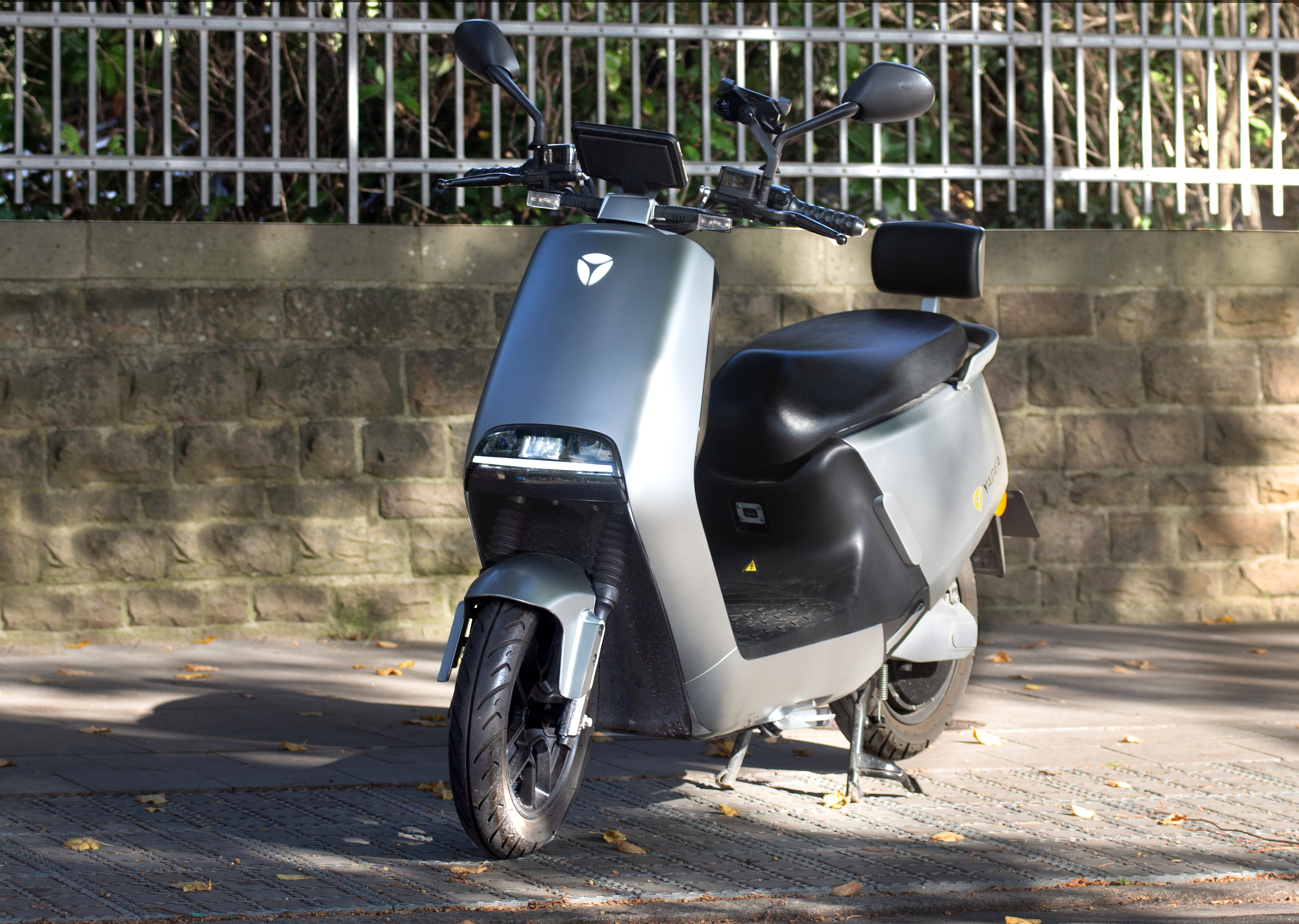
A Yadea G5 in Hamburg, Germany.

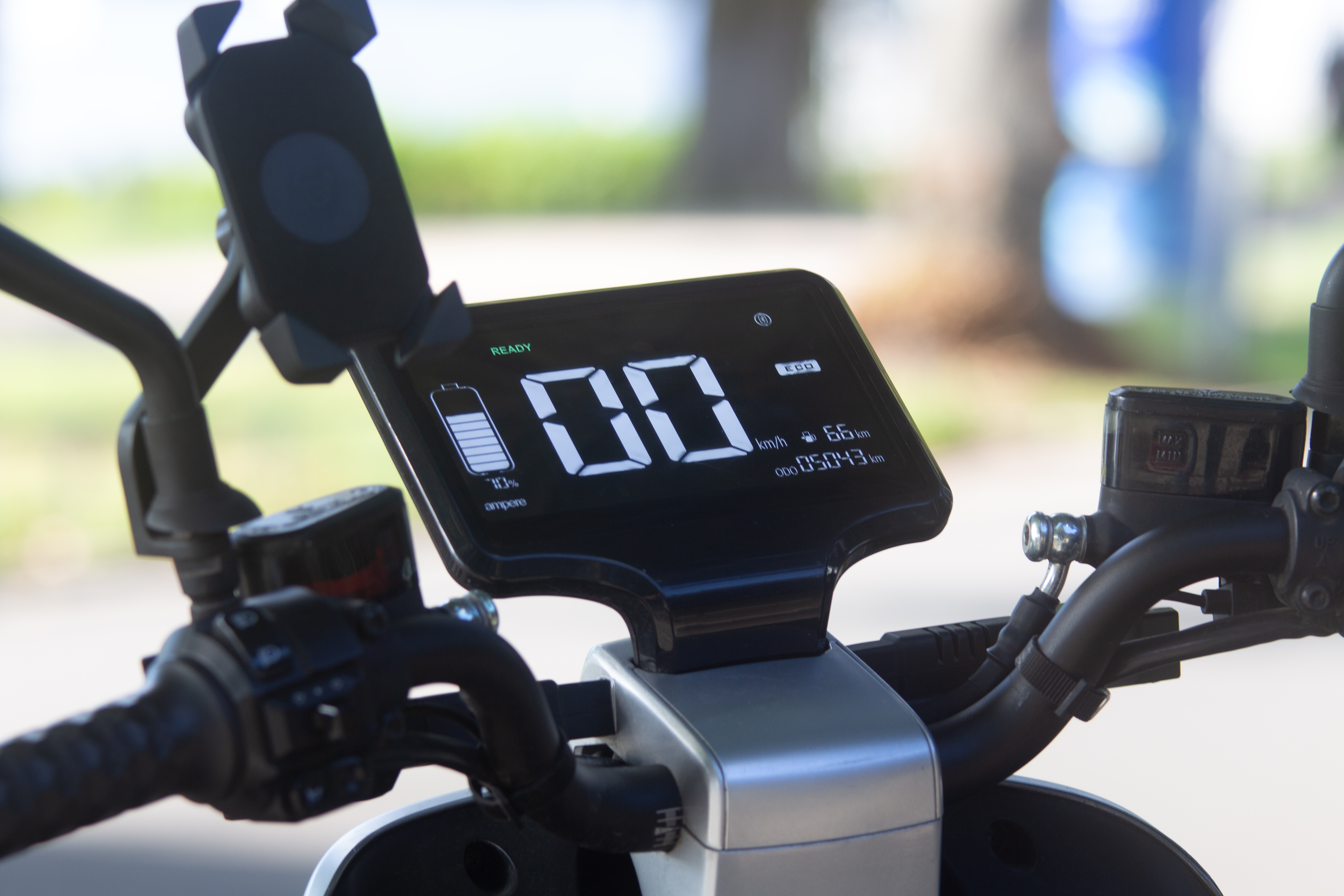
Close-up of the Yadea G5 instrument cluster.

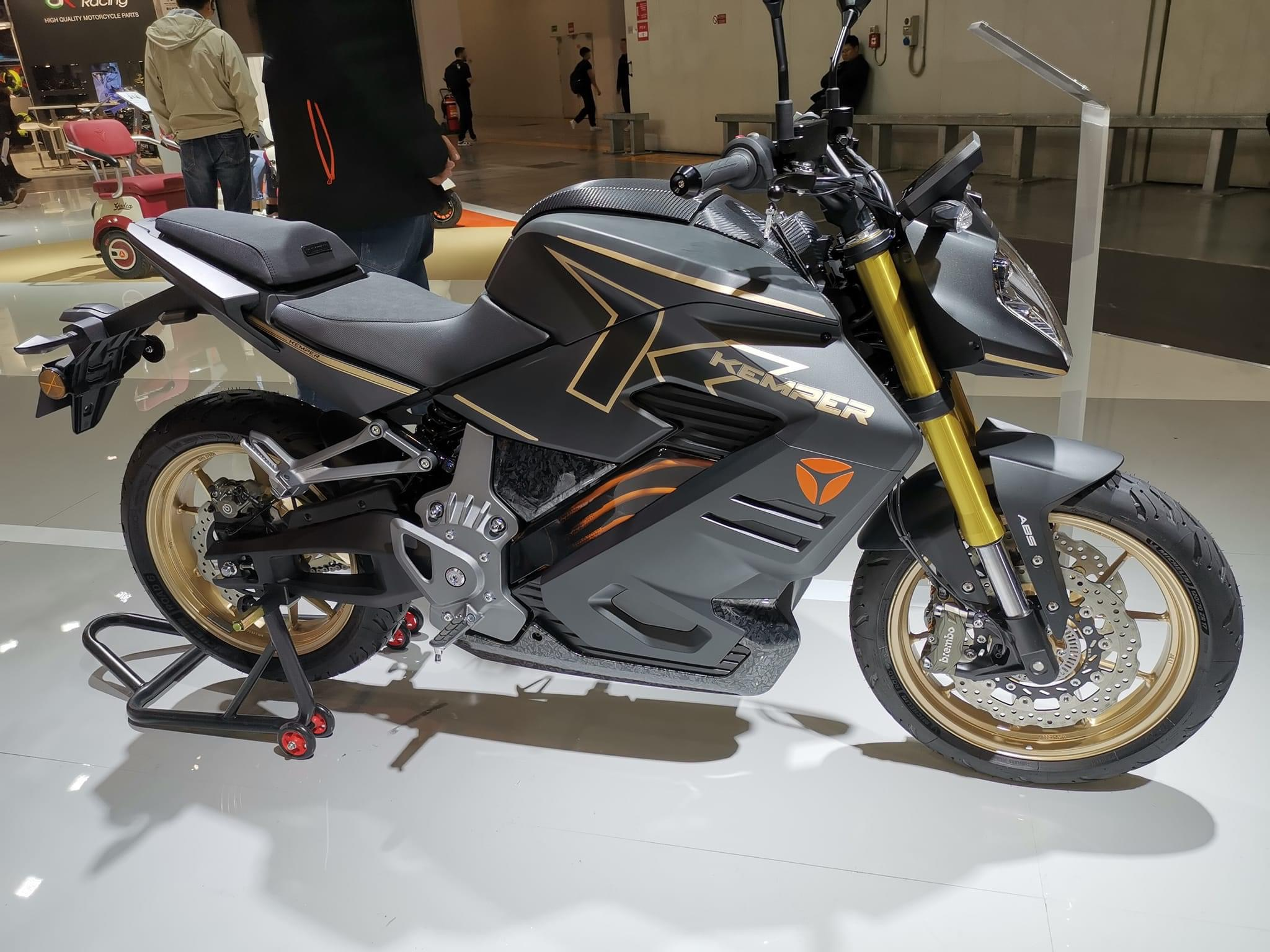
Yadea Kemper, EICMA 2024

Yadea E8S in Dnipro, Ukraine.

== See also ==
- Electric vehicle industry in China
