= Birdy (bicycle) =

Folding bicycle model

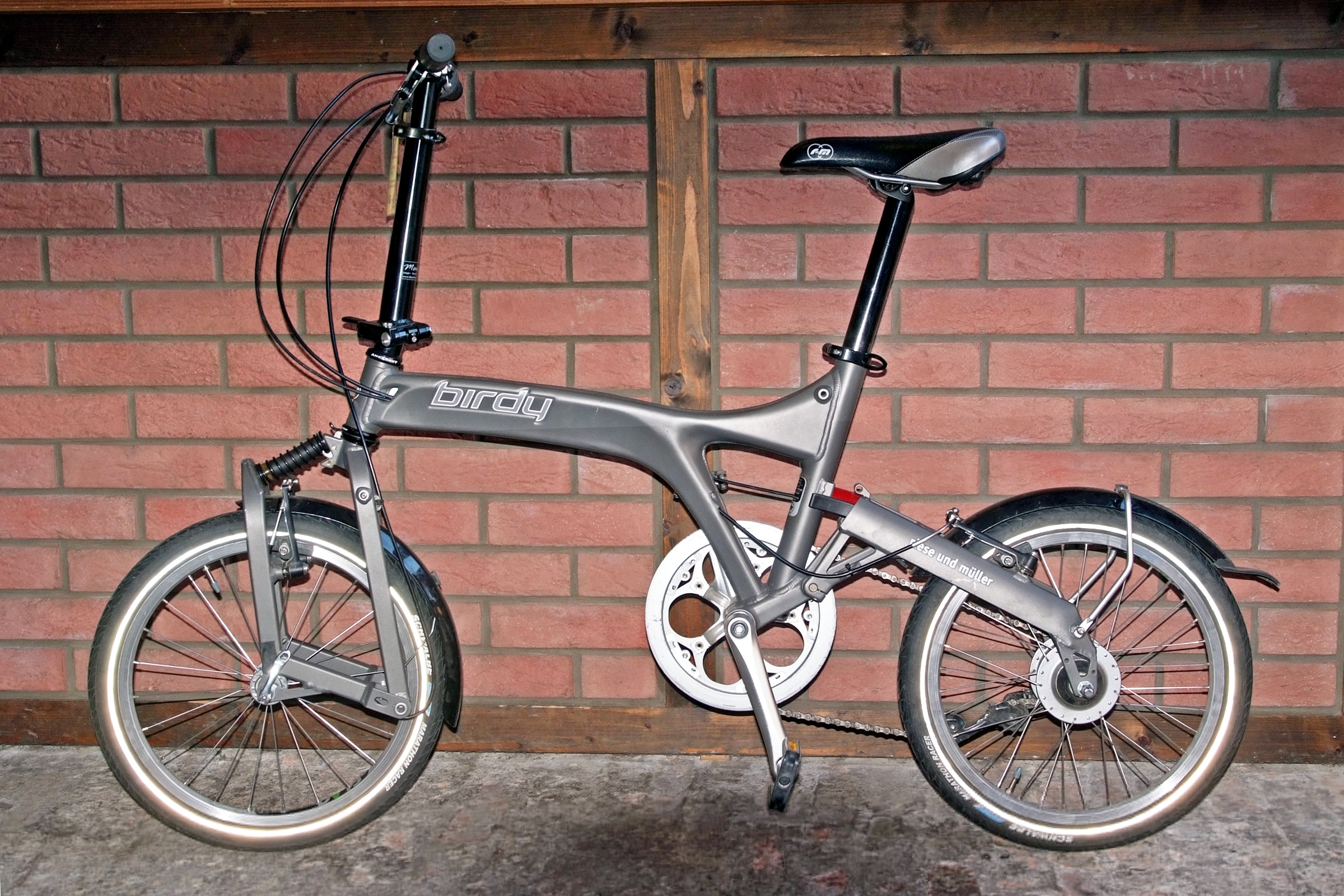
Riese und Müller Birdy with Mark 2 frame

The Birdy is a full suspension folding bicycle designed by Riese und Müller in Germany and produced by Pacific Cycles in Taiwan. As of 2010 over 100,000 had been sold. Riese und Mueller ceased sales in 2026, but the bike is still produced by Pacific Cycles. Three distinct models have been marketed, in addition to some specialist variations, with the third (Mk3) introduced in July 2015.

First released in 1995, it was the first fully suspended folding bike. The ride is regarded by some as more sporty than the Brompton, thanks in part to a stiff single-piece aluminium frame with road bike rider geometry and no hinge. Some prefer its stiff suspended ride and rapid acceleration to that of a full-sized bike.

== Specifications ==
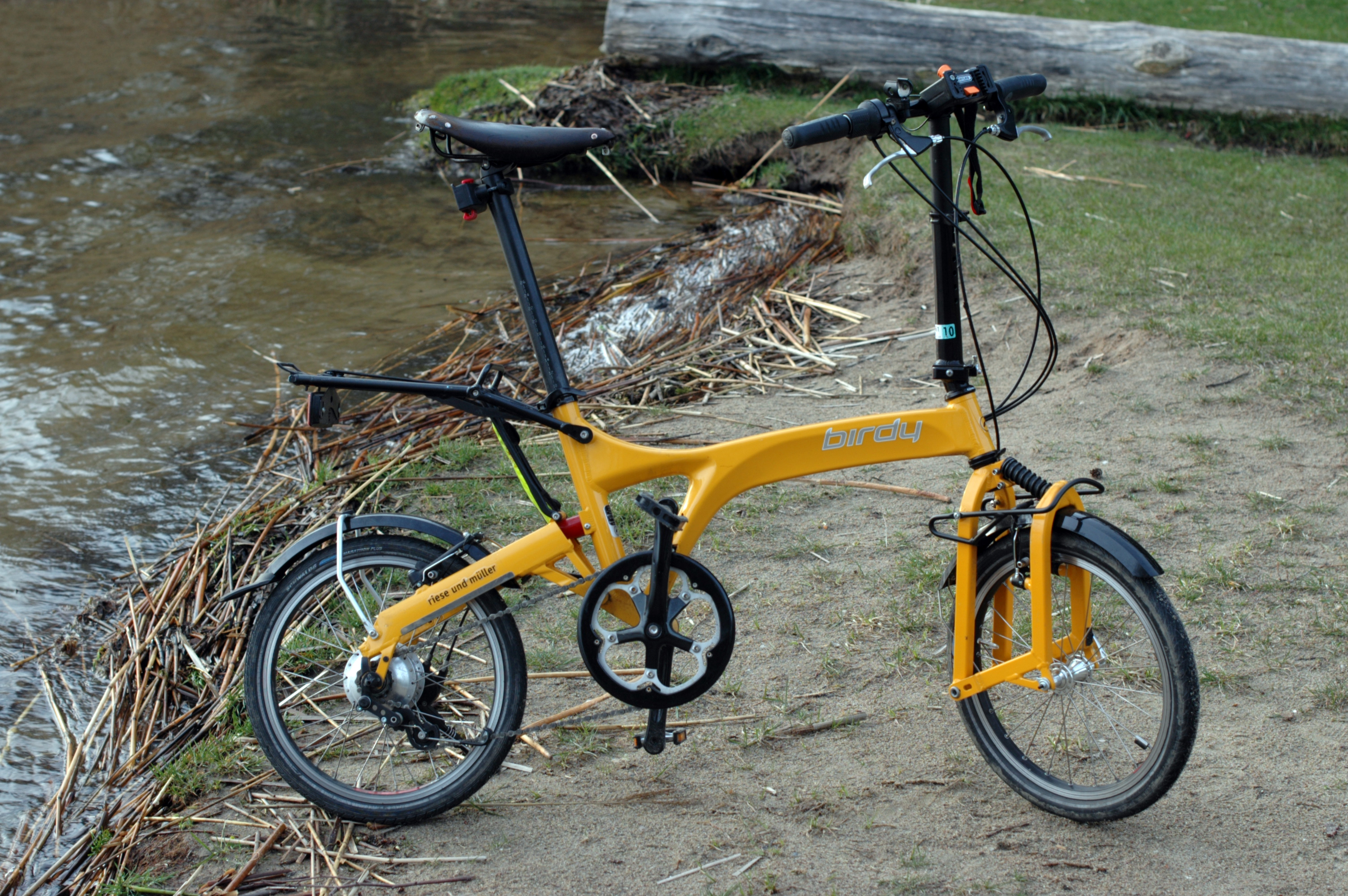
Birdy Rohloff 2011

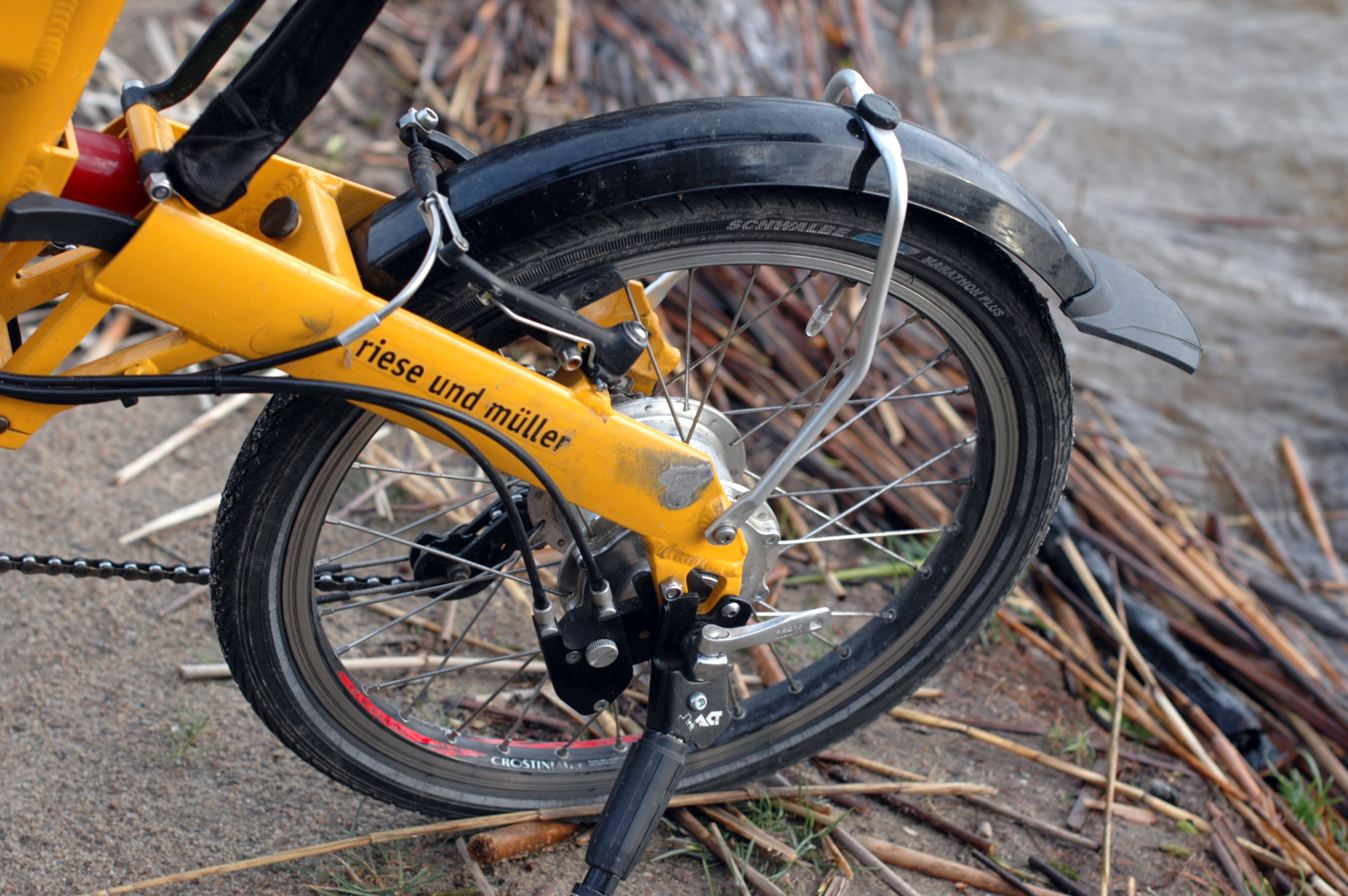

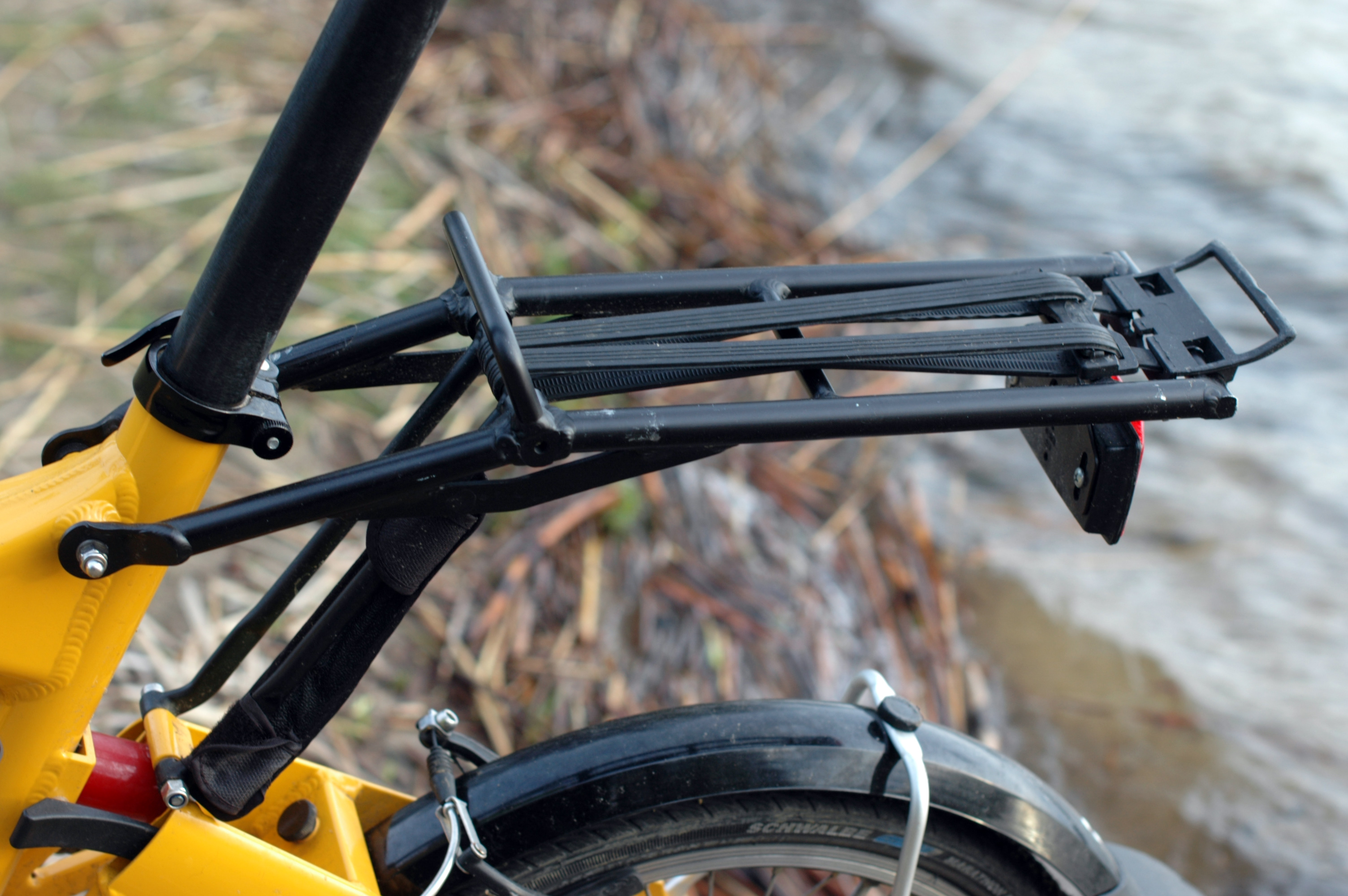

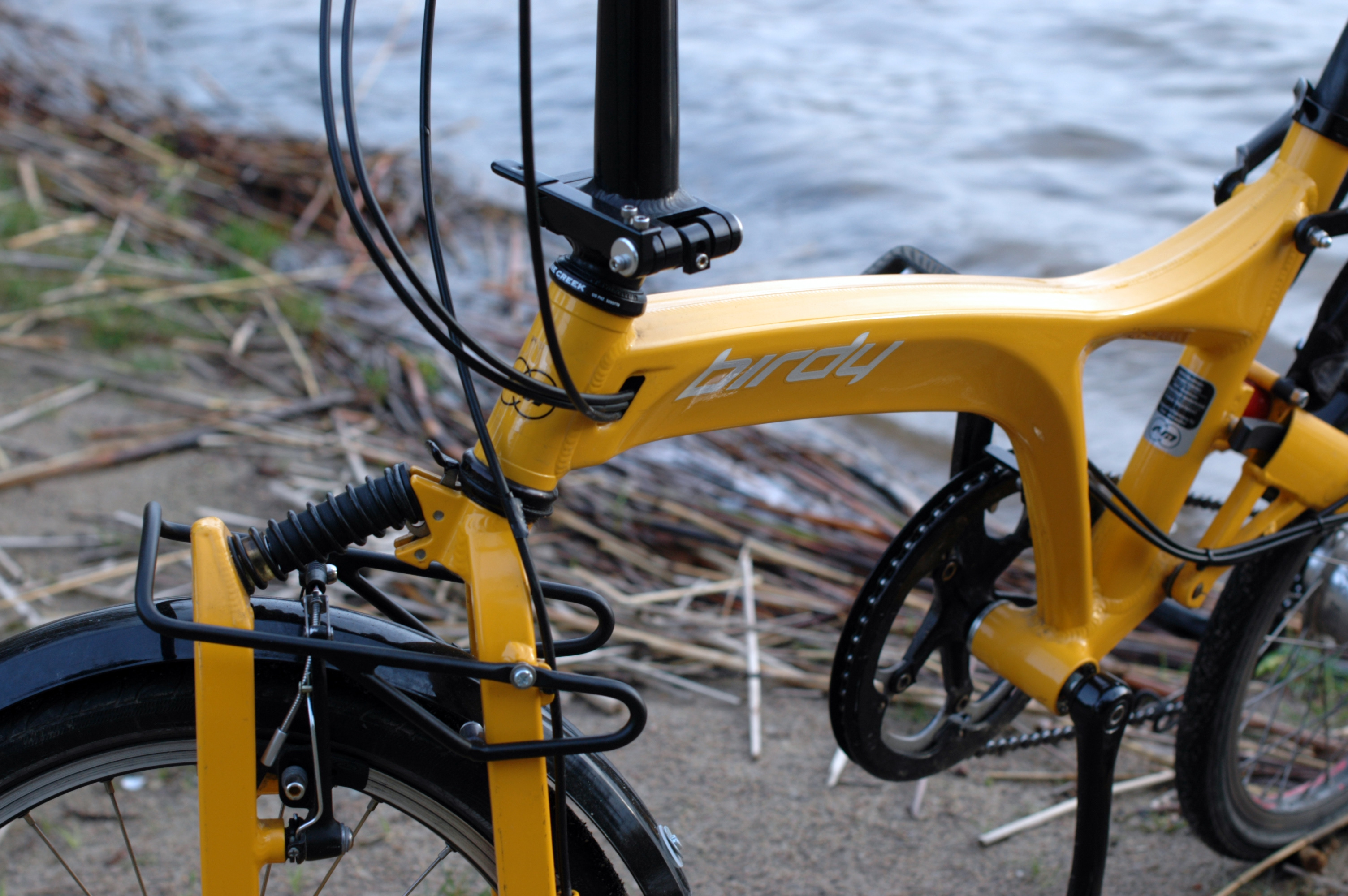

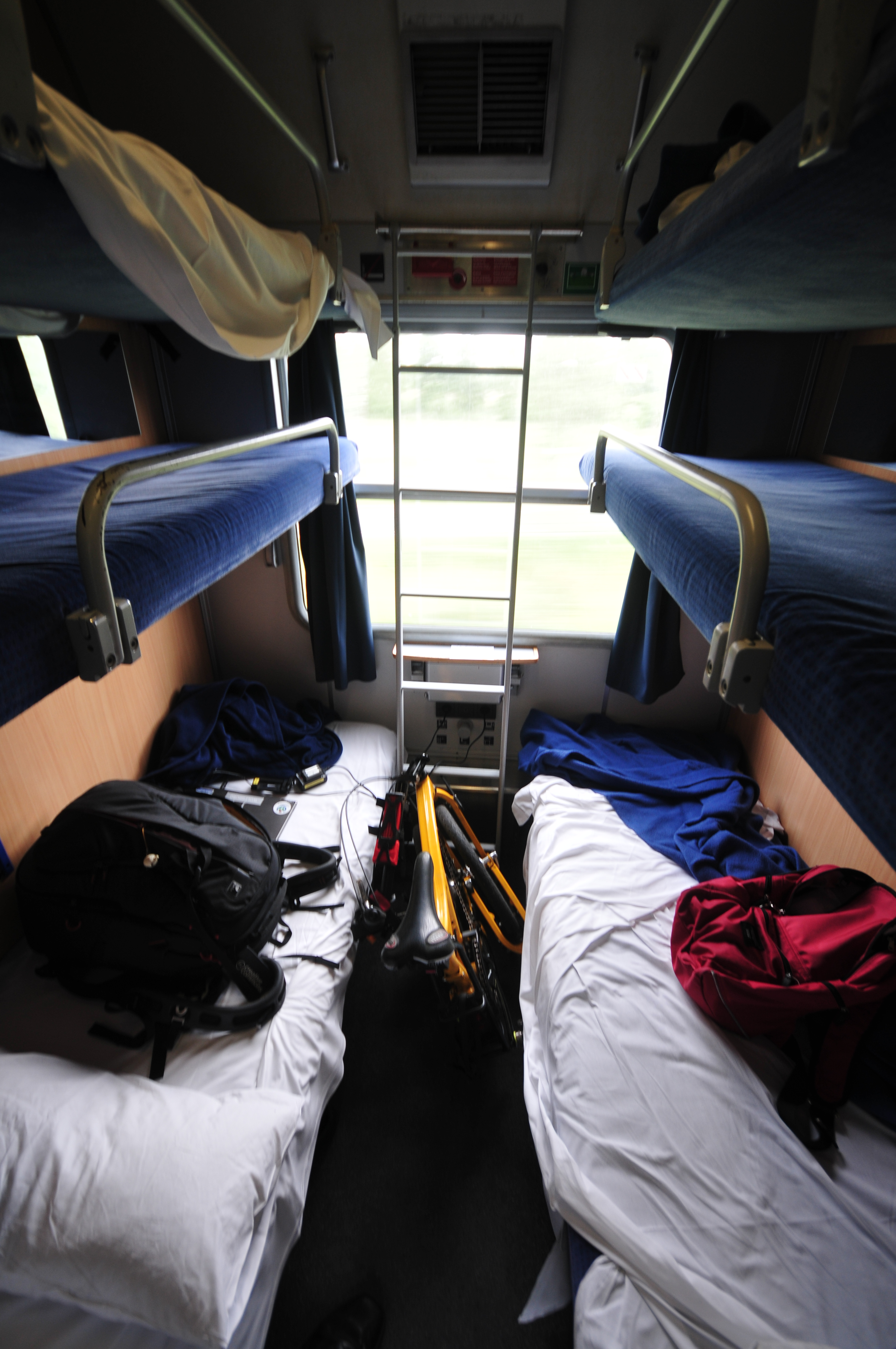
pleated Birdy in a train

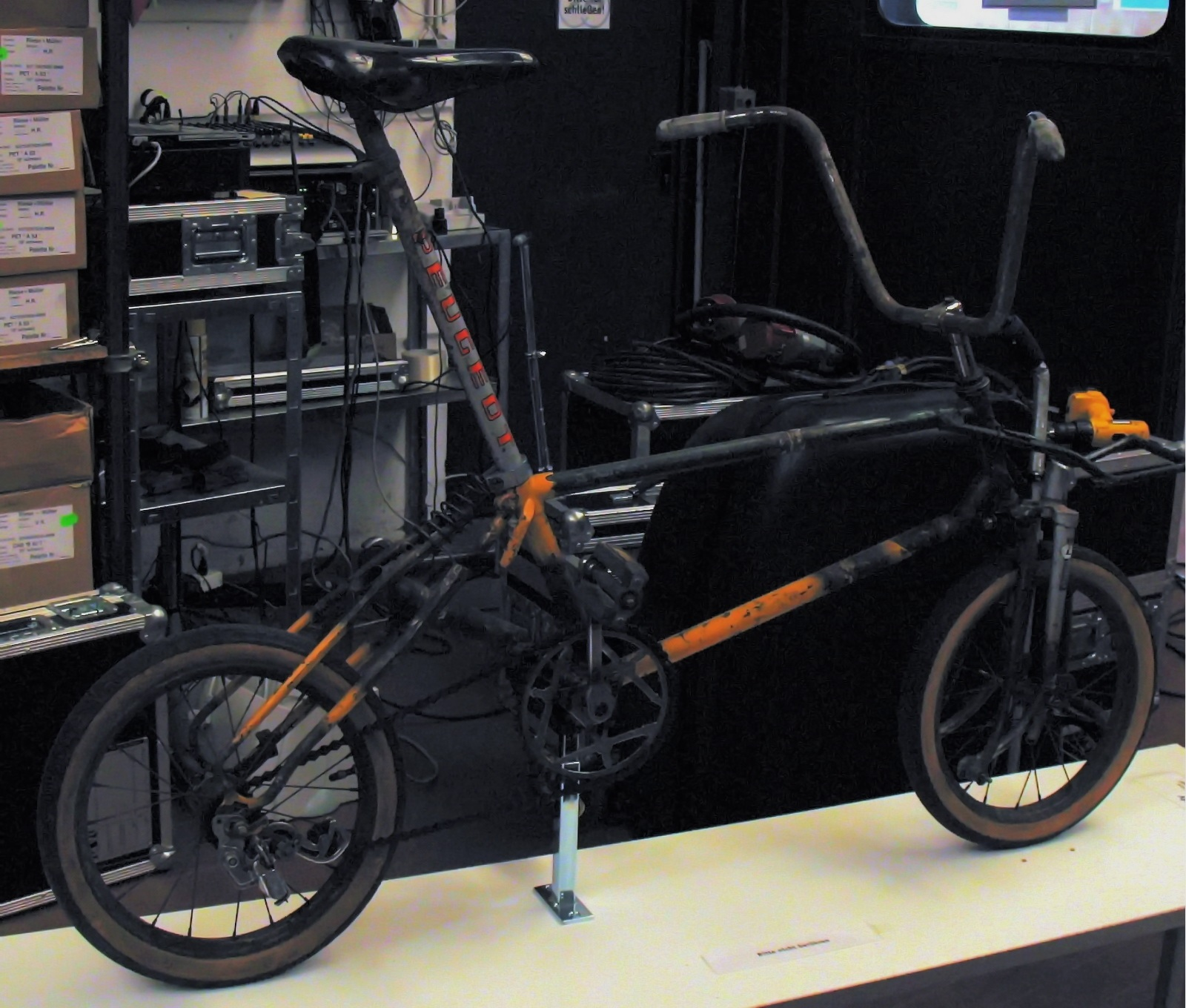
One of the first versions of BIRDY bike designed in 1995.

Markus Riese had the basic idea for the Birdy in 1992. The first prototype was quickly welded together from two old bicycles in his parents' garage (photos and German article here). After a year, Markus Riese and Heiko Müller built a prototype out of aluminium and won the “Hessian Innovation Prize”. The prototype was shown at two trade shows, Intercycle in Cologne and Eurobike in Friedrichshafen, and caused a stir. The first Birdy bikes were sold in late 1995 as a 'de luxe' folder, the first with full suspension. It had a high price tag, usually over US$1,000.

Several specifications were available, most with derailleur gears but including one model with a rubber belt drive. All had only one front chainring, and a range of gearing options on the rear wheel from 6 to 14 gears. There was a short period in 1996-1997 when a stock of blue frames entered the USA and were built up and sold with inferior 6-speed components, branded as 'Jeep Renegade'.

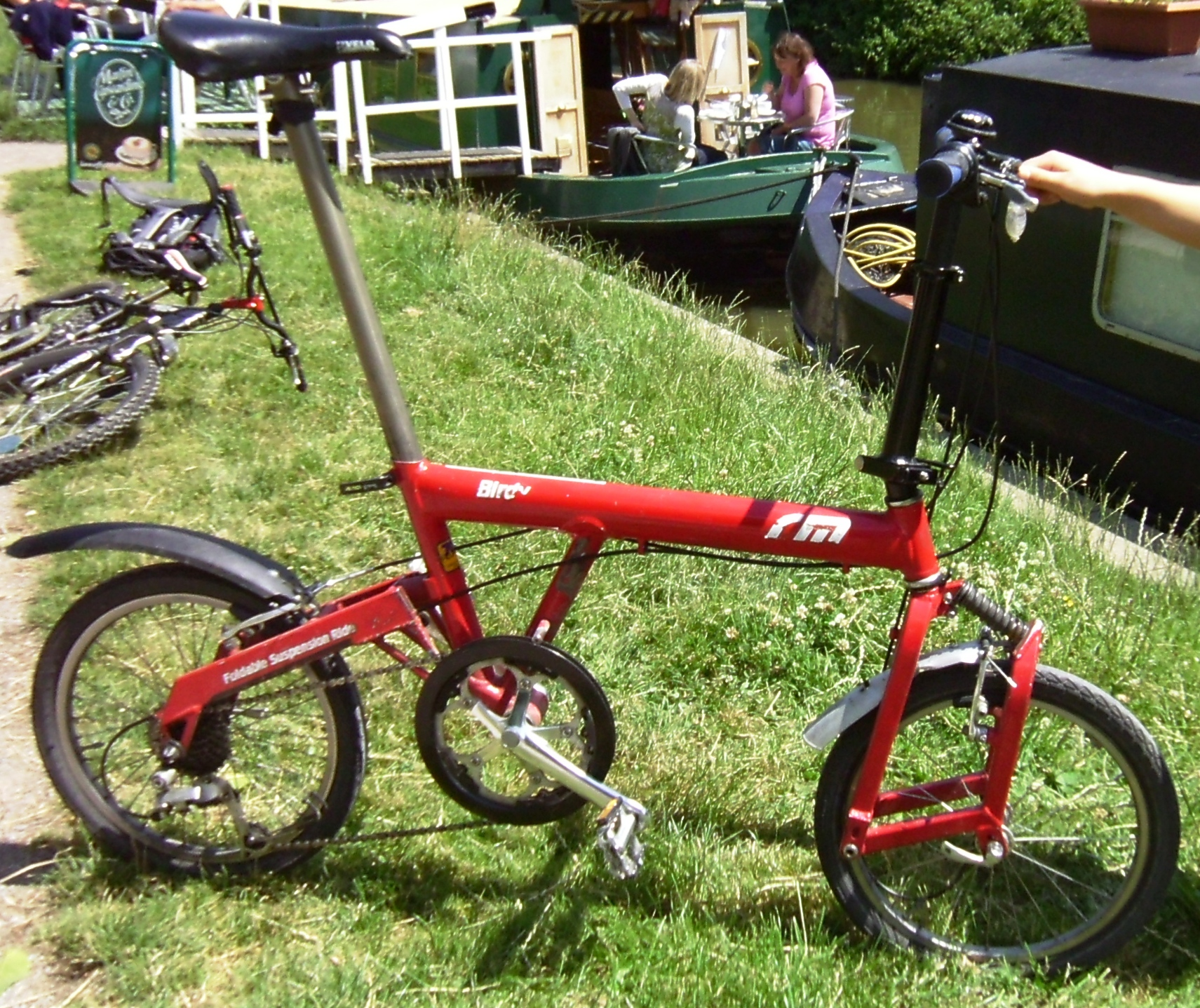
Mark 1 Birdy folding bike from 2000, with 7-speed derailleur

The Birdy's dimensions are small enough to take into offices, on buses, and to pack for travelling. It is the second smallest of the quality folding bikes (behind the Brompton), and is similar in size to the Mezzo performance folder: Width: 35 to 39 cm (13.8 to 15.4 in) Height: 58 to 61 cm (22.8 to 24.0 in) Length: 76 to 79 cm (29.9 to 31.1 in)

The front suspension is unique among bikes currently on the market. The leading arm design provides anti-dive suspension, unlike trailing arm designs. The hinged rear swingarm is suspended by a urethane bush, that can also be replaced with a gas-filled unit. The bike has always offered standard rear dropout spacing, which allows a wide range of gearing options and disc brakes. Standard options currently include: 8-speed hub gear, 8-speed derailleur, 24-speed SRAM Dual Drive hybrid gearing system, and the Rohloff Speedhub 14-speed hub gear. The more expensive models are now fitted with disc brakes.

Wheels are 18" but conversions can easily be made to the more readily available 16" size used by Brompton. For a long time there were no decent 18" tyres. Some owners have fitted 20-inch wheels to the bike (a 10th anniversary limited edition had 20" wheels as standard.

For folding, the rear suspension tucks under the frame, the front suspension is unclipped and hinges back under the frame, and the seat post is collapsed. Lastly the handlebars hinge downward. The front wheel can be left unfolded if the package is to be wheeled, for example when boarding public transport. Folding is relatively more complicated than for a Brompton and takes slightly longer.

Folding a Mark 1 Birdy bike

Available accessories are mudguards, front and rear folding racks, bags, lighting sets and some upmarket extra components sold in Singapore and Hong Kong, like gas suspension units and upgraded chain tensioners for folding. Two optional rear racks are available, the SL Carrier and the Expedition Carrier. The former mounts directly to the swingarm, and allows only the use of a rack-top bag. The latter is a folding 16mm tubular rack mounted on pivots on both the main frame and the swingarm, which allows use of small panniers (e.g. Ortlieb Front Roller) when mudguards (fenders) are fitted. The mounting pivots for this rack have only been fitted to frames since 2003. Both racks are available with rollers which allows the Birdy to roll when folded.

A slightly lighter Mark 2 monocoque frame, with greater support for the seatpost (top picture), was introduced in 2006 along with new component choices. The Mark 1 continued to appear with a slightly updated frame on some models, notably the World Comfort (7 speed Nexus, 14.2 kg or 31 lb and the 'Birdy Classic' of 2020. Mark 1 frames were available in Asia from a third party, badged as Rhine and produced in China or the Philippines.

The standard Mark 2 weighed 10.8 kg (23.8 lb) (2013). Some riders have reduced the Birdy's weight to 8 kg using racing components, but this was only on the Mark 1 frames. Stock bikes ranged from 10.2 kg (22.5 lb) (for the Birdy Speed with Tune and Shimano Ultegra road components) to over 12 kg (26.5 lb), depending on the setup. The heavier bikes tend to have 3x8 gearing systems, involving an internally geared rear hub and an external derailleur. The Birdy Race (10.9 kg or 24.0 lb) was introduced in 2013 and had dropped handlebars, and Shimano 20-speed gears with two front chainrings.

A smaller version of the Birdy, the Frog, was introduced in the 2000s, then withdrawn due to poor sales, and was back on the market again briefly from 2010. It is now a collector's item.

A Mark 3 design was released in July 2015. The frame looks the same as a Mk2, but the fold is smaller, the bike is slightly lighter, components have again been strengthened, and the front fork redesigned. The confusing number of models has been reduced to four. There have been several iterations since, throuhg Pacific Cycles as of 2026.

== Average price ==
Equipment set up differs greatly from country to country. In the US, entry-level bikes cost approximately $1,500 and are equipped with low-mid range Shimano Alivio components. The Birdy monocoque frameset cost approximately US$1,000 without parts, but is hard to find. Prices for the Mk 2 rose to the electric model with a 250watt motor in the rear wheel (£3258/US$5068, 2013)

In the UK, the entry-level model (World Sport) cost £939 (in 2013) to permit purchase under cycle-to-work schemes. High-end titanium models (rare outside Japan and Taiwan) can cost over US$4,500. Japan, Indonesia, Malaysia, Singapore, Taiwan and China are the biggest markets for these bikes and customised spares are available from companies like Colorplus and Ridea. In Japan, the bike is distributed as the Bianchi Fretta (OEM) and BD-1. The cheapest model in Australia was A$1,400 in 2015 and around A$2000 in 2021.

The Birdy was distributed in Europe by Riese und Müller, but in 2025 they ceased marketing and sales to focus exclusively on electic bikes. Production remains in Taiwan through Pacific Cycles and Pacific Cycles Japan, in North America through dealers B-Fold. and in Australia by St.Kilda Cycles (until 2013, then again from 2015). Some distributors make custom modifications to the bicycle including better suspension dampers and wheels.

== Uses and advantages ==
With its wide range of gearing options, stiff frame and basic suspension, the Birdy is suitable not only for commuting but also for longer distance touring.

The combination of smooth but stiff ride, fold, and quirky looks have created a fetish for the Birdy in Japan and other parts of Asia. It also has a large following in the UK, Europe, the US, and Australia. The Birdy's folded size is similar to the 20-inch Dahon folders: larger than a Brompton, but significantly smaller than a Bike Friday (including the Tikit).

The Birdy's advantages over conventional bicycles and other folding ones are:

- It folds quickly into a small package. Thus, it can be taken into stores, onto trains, and into the office, yet can also be used for cross-country touring or fast group rides. It is much easier to fit in a suitcase than comparable Bike Friday or Airnimal models, but less easy to pack than a Brompton. The only other hinge-free performance bicycle that is small enough to serve as a multi-mode commuter or that fits into an airline legal suitcase with minimal disassembly is the (unsuspended) Mezzo folding bike.
- A Birdy can fit into a standard airline-legal 29-inch suitcase, but this requires the pedals, wheels, and rear rack to be removed. Some Birdy owners have had difficulty fitting both the bike and the rear rack into a standard suitcase, and recommend the larger 31-inch format. When fitted with thin racing tires and removable pedals, the bike can fit in a suitcase with less disassembly. With a larger case (designed specifically for the Birdy), no disassembly is required. A standard slipcase must be used on some trains and buses.
- The suspension allows for a smooth ride on small wheels. The anti-dive suspension has minimal impact on pedalling efficiency due to its stiffness, while improving rolling resistance on rough surfaces. The suspension can be adjusted using different elastomers (small pieces of rubber that serve as suspension, but gas filled alternatives are available).
- The Birdy has no frame hinge, with both the front and the back points of contact serving as latches and shock absorbers. Thus, the downward force of the rider holds the bike together in such a way that the latches cannot fail while providing shock absorption.
- The bike has a sportier ride than the Brompton and has a wide range of gears.

The bicycle supports long-distance touring through various luggage racks and panniers from Riese und Müller and third-party manufacturers. Reviews by AtoB magazine noted the speed and comfort of the Mark2, while stating that the folding mechanism is complex if steps are missed. Although options for the 18-inch rims were initially limited, various options are available, including the foldable, Kevlar-beaded tires.

== Disadvantages ==
The main criticisms are:

- The Birdy is expensive, with some models costing as much as custom made bikes. Nonetheless, secondhand Birdys can be bought on eBay or from specialist listing like AtoB for as little as US$500 for a Mark 1 model, and more commonly up to $700.
- The 100% aluminium components used to experience stress fractures in the early years, particularly when ridden by heavier riders or very energetically. New models have much stronger components.
- The Birdy uses 18 inch (355mm ETRTO) wheels. This allows for a compact folded size but makes finding replacement wheels, tubes and tires more difficult.
- Gears and brake components are standard. But the availability of some spare parts for the Birdy is rare, even in places in which sell folding bicycles, due to their unique design. For example: The Birdy uses a unique rear rack, a "spoon" clip to hold the rear in place, and unique front suspension bearings. Mudguards, however, can be made from any plastic equivalent and are a cheaper option than the Birdy models.

Criticisms noticed by some riders:

- Component selection on the Mk 2 sometimes seemed illogical, with lower level Capreo components on the top-of-the-line monocoque frame, and higher quality SRAM X7 components on the less expensive model. However, the Capreo groupset was specifically designed for small-wheel bicycles as its smallest 9-tooth sprocket compensates for the small wheel size.
- The unique front folding mechanism - while popular and distinctive - is long, weaker, and more flexible than a standard design; the tolerance of linkages amplifies the flex, causing the leading arms to wander up to the Mk2 design (now much strengthened); thus an old Birdy may be unstable at speed. Bushes on the front suspension can be replaced.
- The Birdy, like most folders, has a long seatpost and stem. Thousands of km of use can damage the headset or weaken the stem mount - old models could experience cracking after about ten years. The longer handlebar stem limits the extent to which the rider can pull on the handlebars, but a stronger adjustable version was introduced in the early 2000s that is more sturdy, and a further improvement in 2015. The larger head tube on the Moulton gives it better hill climbing and sprinting abilities. However, with proper cycling shoes, Birdy riders can be found in non-UCI racing events and in pacelines of fast group rides.
- The back folding mechanism, which folds beneath the frame, doesn't retain chain tension when folded if derailleur gears are fitted (unlike the Brompton for example). Again, this has been solved on the Mk 3.

== See also ==
- Outline of cycling
