= Hussain Almossawi =

Designer

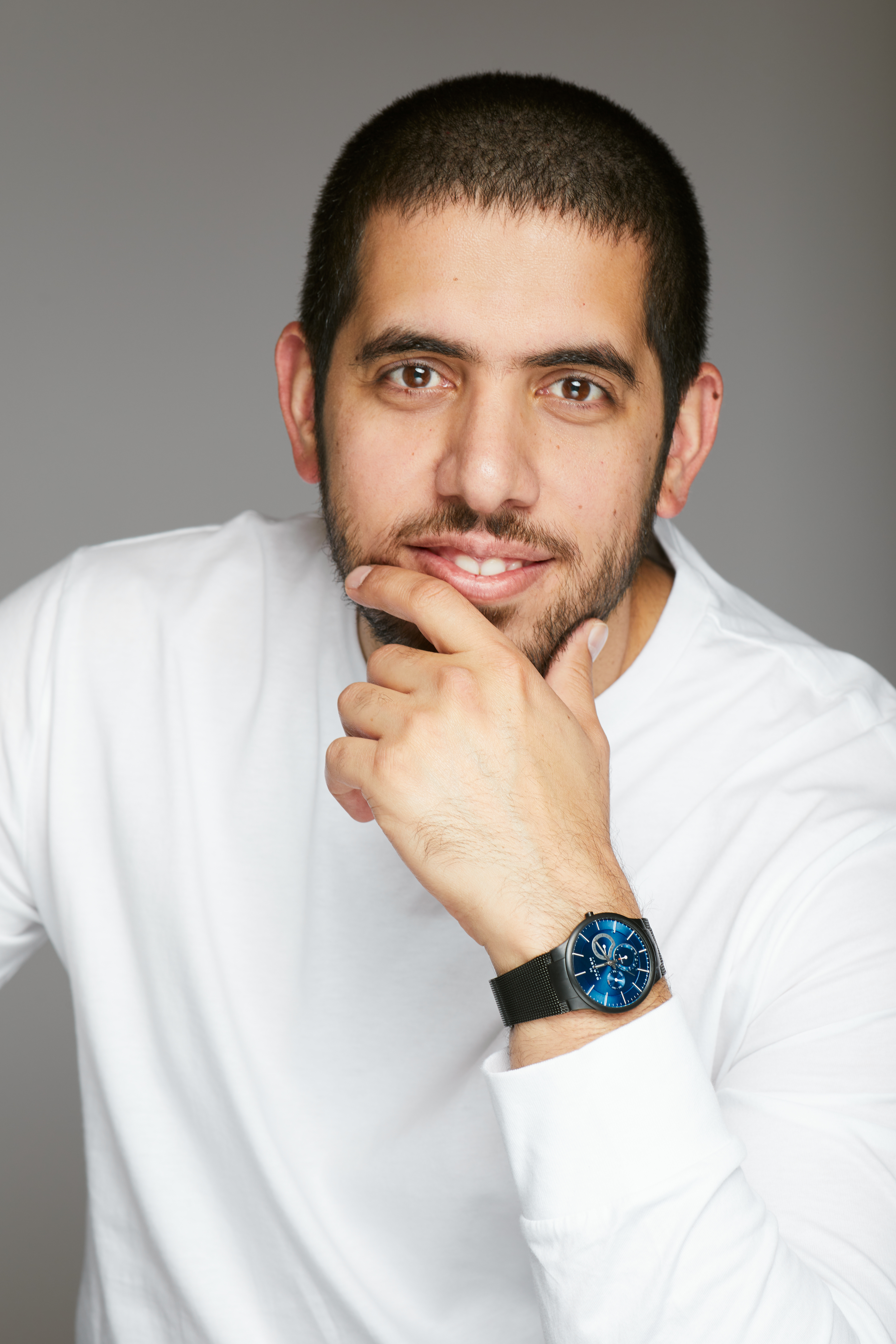
- Born: Bahrain
- Education: University of Alberta, University of Illinois at Urbana-Champaign
- Known for: Design, CGI, founding nCycle
- Website: mossawistudios.com

Hussain Almossawi (born 1988) is a Product Designer, CGI Artist, and bestselling author of The Innovator's Handbook: A Short Guide to Unleashing Your Creative Mindset, based in New York City.

Almossawi is known for his futuristic designs including his work on automotives, footwear and CGI. He has designed products and concepts for companies like Nike, Adidas, EA Sports, and Ford.

== Early life and education ==
Hussain Almossawi is a Brooklyn-based designer from Bahrain. He received his Bachelor of Fine Arts in graphic design at the University of Illinois at Urbana–Champaign, and subsequently received his Master of Design at University of Alberta.

== Career ==
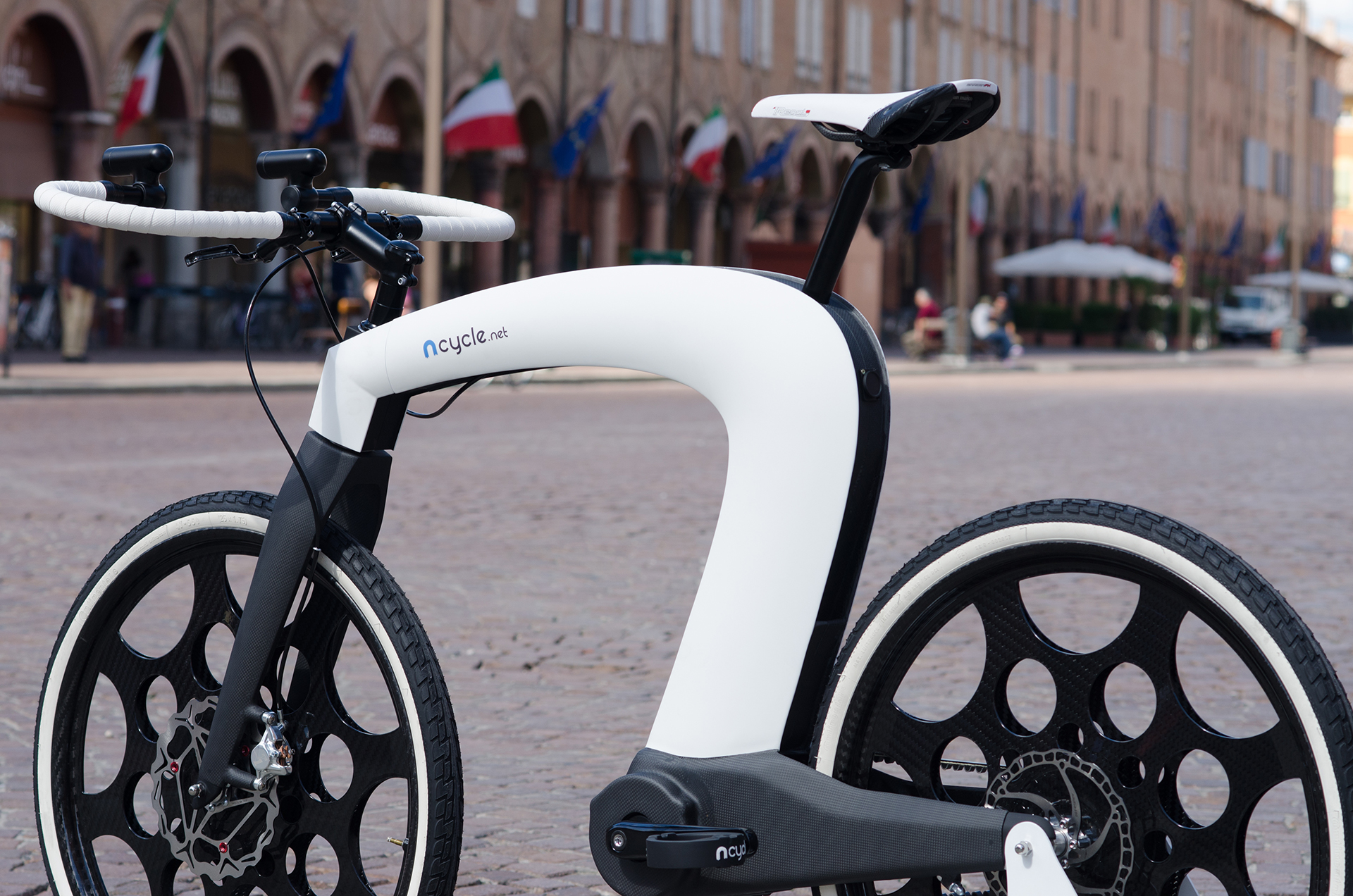
nCycle e-bike at Eurobike 2014

Hussain Almossawi began his career designing official websites and logos for NBA players such as Derrick Rose, Allen Iverson and Tracy McGrady. He also designed official websites for Adidas Basketball. Almossawi created Type Fluid, a 3-D typography experiment. He was named one of Fast Company's "10 Inspiring Type Designers From A New Generation". In 2016 he designed a pair of sneakers based on the Teenage Mutant Ninja Turtles with footwear designer Quintin Williams. That same year, Almossawi designed Enfuse, a custom tea maker.

Almossawi was a graphic designer at Ogilvy & Mather before working on the user interface design for the Electronic Arts game FIFA 15. Afterwards, Almossawi was a design consultant at Nike, Inc. on multiple projects, which included working on Nike Basketball's signature shoe lines for athletes such as Kobe Bryant, LeBron James, Kevin Durant and Kyrie Irving. Almossawi was a senior designer at Adidas from 2016 until 2019, and worked on projects for athletes such as James Harden and Damian Lillard.

Almossawi and Marin Myftiu designed the Jaguar XKX concept car in 2012, which was featured on the cover of Jaguar Magazine. He collaborated with Myftiu again to create the nCycle, an award-winning folding e-bike. The nCycle was runner-up at the 2013 Core77 Design Awards and was one of Yanko Design's "Best Transportation Designs of 2013". It was exhibited at Eurobike 2014, and the nCycle Special Edition was released in 2015. Based on the success of the nCycle, Almossawi and Myftiu designed the nThree, an electric three-wheeled vehicle, based on a hybrid of an electric car and an electric bike. He also designed the Huracan City Rover, an environmentally friendly microcar designed for urban transport. The rover won the 2016 Michelin "Mobility for All" Challenge Design.

In 2019, Almossawi founded his own design studio Mossawi Studios in Brooklyn, which focuses on VFX and product design, and serves as the studio's Chief Designer. He has worked with brands such as Apple, Nike, Versace, Ford Motor Company, LG, Pepsi, and Samsung. Mossawi Studios works on designs for products in the footwear, automotive and medical industries. The studio's designs include Oxygem, a pulse oximetry smart ring designed for individuals living with Sickle cell disease, and the 411 Porsche concept car.

== Books ==
- The Innovator's Handbook: A Short Guide to Unleashing Your Creative Mindset (2022)

== Reception ==
His designs have been featured in publications such as Fast Company, Wired UK, Hypebeast, Motor1.com, Mashable, Auto Motor und Sport, Highsnobiety, Yanko Design, SoccerBible, Gizmodo, and Adobe's Substance 3D Magazine.

== Teaching and speaking engagements ==
From 2018 to 2019, Hussain Almossawi was an adjunct professor at The New School, where he taught Human factors and ergonomics, and now serves as a member on the advisory panel for Pace University’s Lubin School of Business in New York, Design Thinking Program. He is a frequent public speaker, and has presented workshops and designs at events such as, Bike to the Future, Solidworks Conference in Bologna, Saudi Design Week, and -ING Creative Festival in Dubai. He frequently publishes design tutorials and articles in magazines and trade publications.
