= Riese und Müller =

German bicycle manufacturer

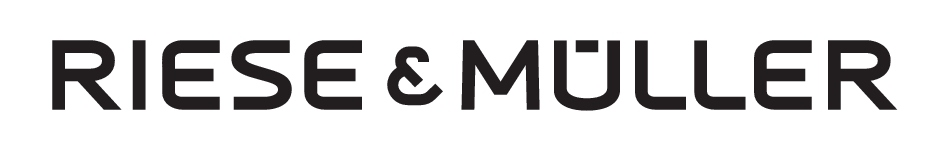
- Founded: 1993; 33 years ago
- Founders: Markus Riese; Heiko Müller
- Headquarters: Mühltal, Germany

Riese & Müller is a bicycle manufacturer in Mühltal, Germany. Founded by Markus Riese and Heiko Müller, it designs and makes suspended bicycles. Frames are produced by companies such as Triangle's, Portugal. All of their bikes are assembled by hand in Germany.

== History ==
=== Founding and first model: 1993-1996 ===
The company was officially founded in 1993. It was founded by Markus Riese and Heiko Müller, who had met studying mechanical engineering in Darmstadt in 1988. After a 1991 cycle trip to Tunisia, they decided they had a shared interest in developing bicycles. In 1992, they started working on the design for a folding bike with the pivot points acting as suspension, but which rode like a normal bike, which hadn't been done before. According to Wired Magazine, the two German mechanical engineers in 1992 "realized that if you give a bike full suspension, those points of suspension can double as points of rotation for a folding bike. Less than a year later, Müller read about the Hesse Innovation Prize and built an aluminum prototype in ten days (and nights)." In 1993, they submitted their bike for the 1993 Hesse Innovation Award, and the Birdy won the Special Award.

The Birdy was showcased under the company name riese und müller at Intercycle in Cologne and Eurobike in Friedrichshafen in 1993 and 1994. They company also showcased other products, including an invention to keep ears warm under bike helmets. They received little interest until George Lin, a businessperson from Taiwan, wanted to build the Birdy. George Lin had founded Pacific Cycles, an original equipment manufacturer (OEM). In 1994 and 1995, the Birdy was built into a production-ready prototype, with the founders raising the funds to have 250 Birdys initially produced in Taiwan. The company headquarters was an old dairy farm in Darmstadt. Pacific Cycles began manufacturing the Birdy. The Birdy sold well in 1995 and 1996, and was also sold in the United States and Japan.

Riese & Müller was founded in 1993 to sell Hot Ears, earmuffs to keep the ears warm while wearing a helmet. The first bicycle, the folding bicycle known as the Birdy, started in the garage of Heiko Müller's parents as a university project. In 2006 it started selling Zwei bike bags.

=== Other models and e-bikes: 1997-2024 ===
In 1997, the company began creating new bikes for urban riding and touring. In 2008, the company began incorporating motors, including electric versions of the Birdy and their Delite model. Their Jetstream electric model won the Eurobike Green Award. The company subsequently focused on electric bikes, with all model ranges except the Birdy converted solely to pedelecs. The company's new Packster 40 cargo bike was presented at Eurobike 2017 and won a Eurobike Award. As of 2018 Riese & Müller had a revenue of €76 million a year.

Economist Sandra Wolf became a third CEO in 2019. In 2022, it had sales of 350 million euros. The company's Carrie cargo bike, released in 2024, was priced at £5,469. The aluminum frame was manufactured in Portugal. The Birdy P40 bike is still produced by Pacific Cycles. The company currently has a campus in Mühltal, Germany. Wolf remains CEO.

== Notable models ==
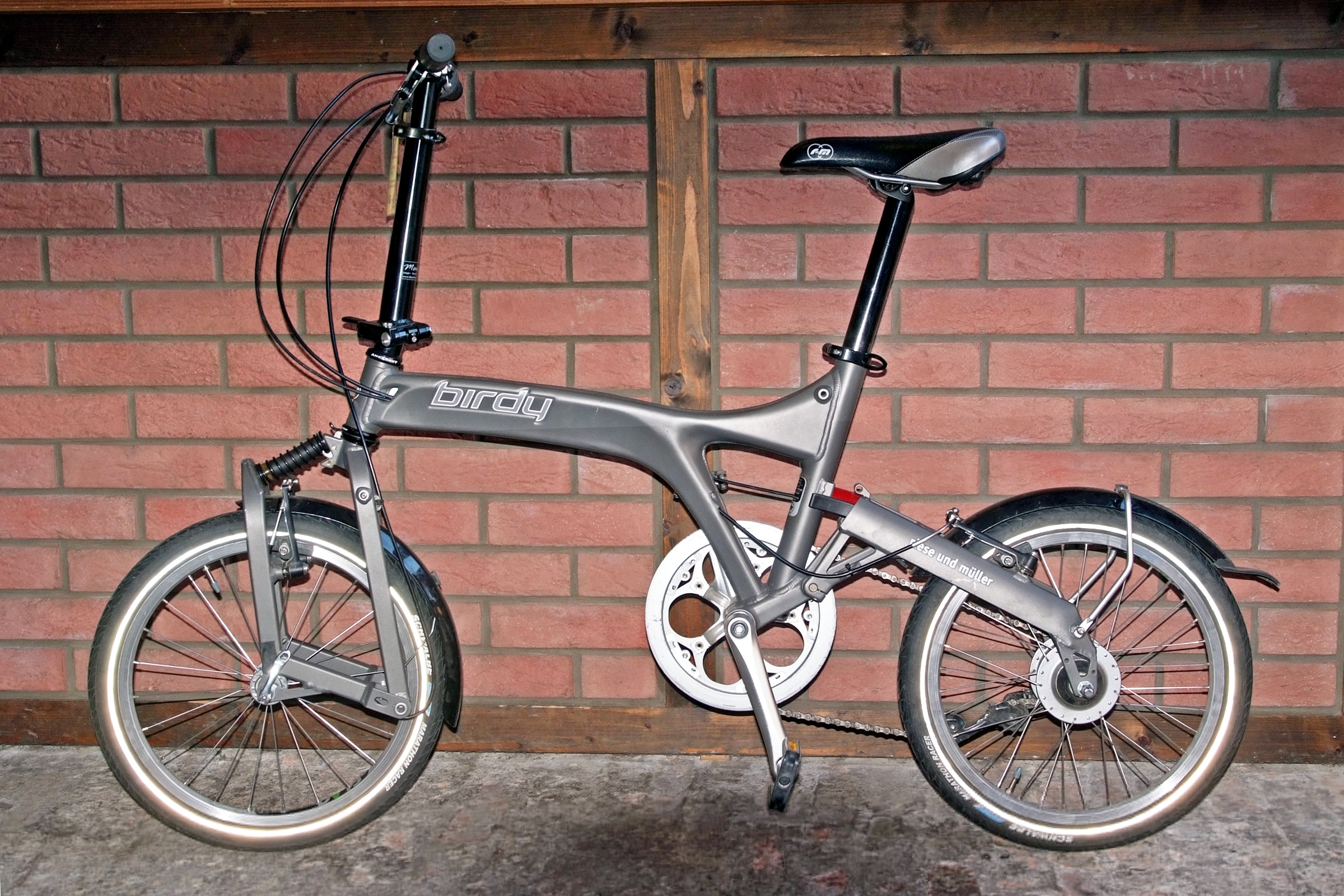
Riese und Müller Birdy with Mark 2 frame

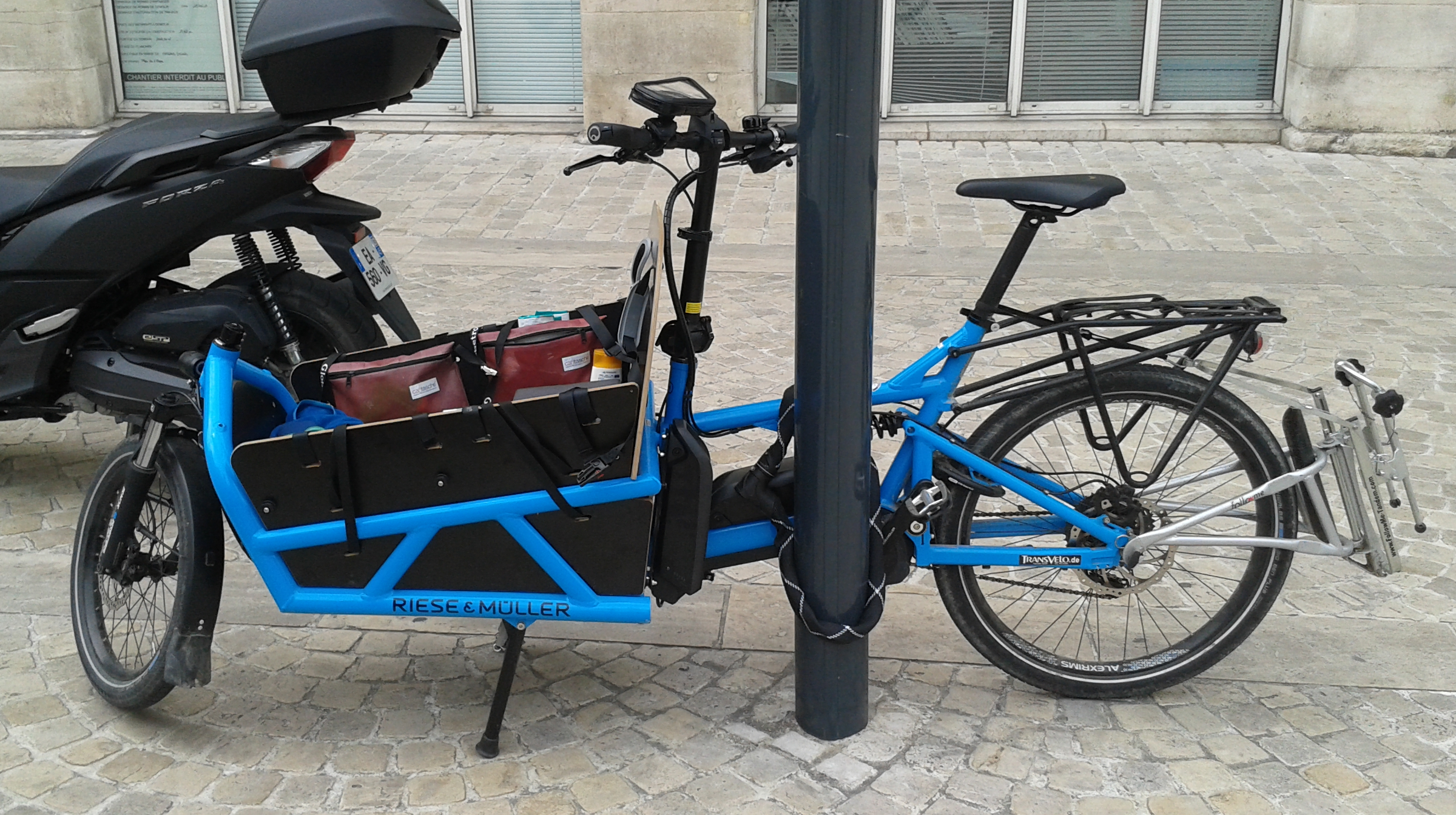
Riese und Müller e-cargo bike

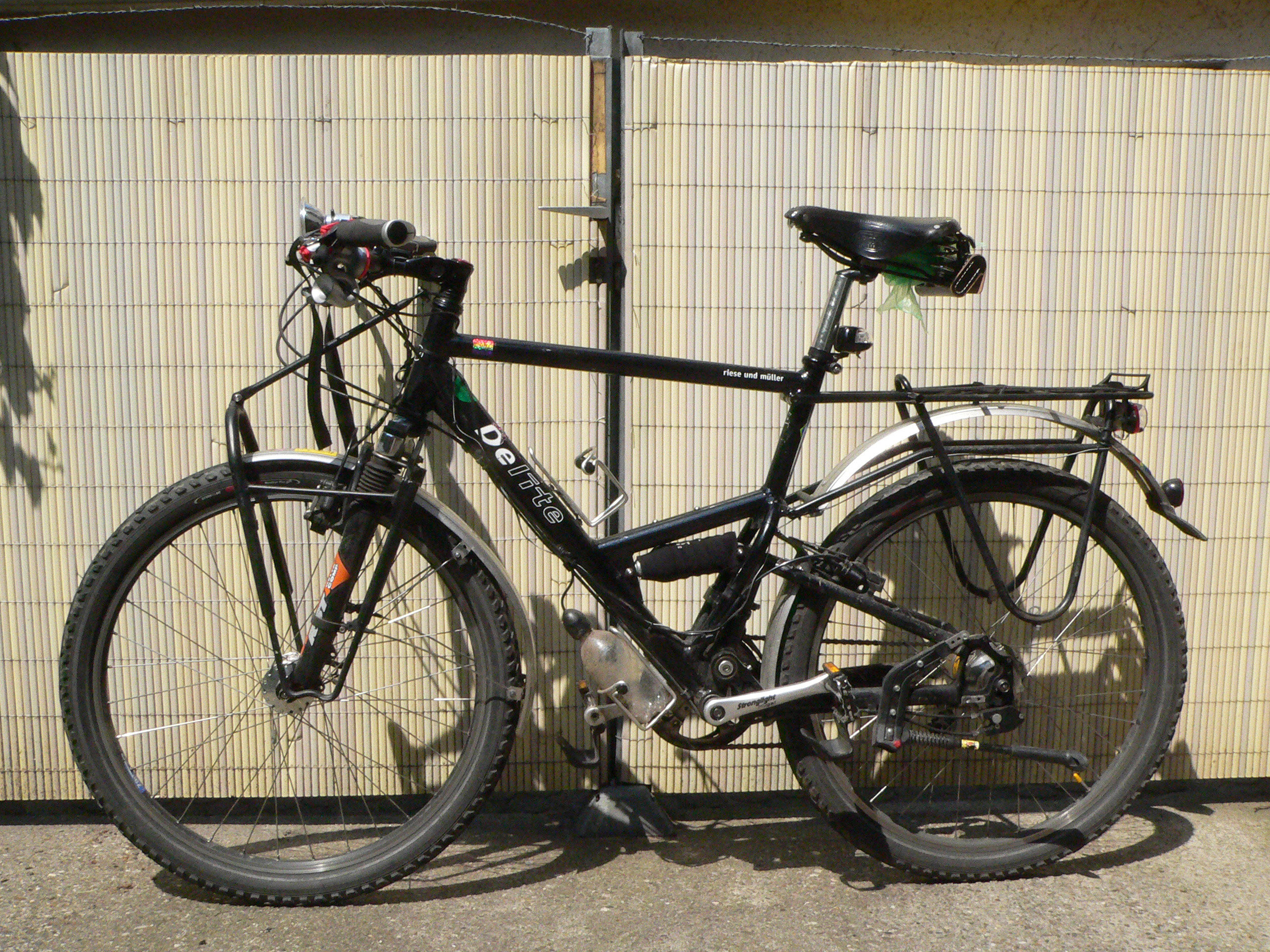
Delite Black

Various bike models produced by Riese & Müller include:

- Birdy (a folding bike with 18" wheels)
- Charger3
- Multitinker
- Tinker
- Delight4
- Super delight
- Load - cargo e-bike with cargo box and electric motor, reaches speeds up to 28 mph.
  - Load 60
  - Load 75
  - Load4 60
  - Load4 75
- Packster 70
- Transporter 60
- Transporter 85
- Carrie
- Multicharger Mixte
- Roadster
- Nevo4
- Cruiser Mixte
- Frog bicycle (a folder with 12" wheels, discontinued for years but available with 16" wheels as of 2010)
- Avenue
- Homage (since November 2005)
- Intercontinenta

Various discontinued models include:

- Equinox (discontinued)
- Gemini (discontinued)

== See also ==
- List of electric bicycle brands and manufacturers
- Outline of cycling
