= Pacific Cycles =

Taiwanese bicycle manufacturer

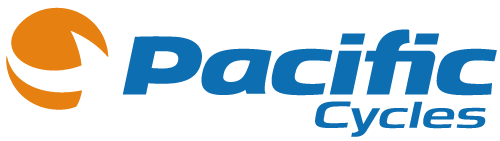
- Type: Private
- Industry: Bicycle design; Bicycle manufacture
- Founded: 1980; 46 years ago
- Founder: George Lin
- Headquarters: Xinwu, Taoyuan, Taiwan
- Products: Folding bicycles, adaptive vehicles, e-bikes, cargo bikes
- Website: www.pacific-cycles.com

Pacific Cycles is a Taiwanese bicycle designing and manufacturing company headquartered in Xinwu District, Taoyuan City. The company manufactures its self-designed cycles including folding bicycles, electric bicycles, tricycles and other supportive cycles. It has an in-house research and development studio known as "Section Zero" for new product development and also provides original design manufacturing services for over 40 bicycle brands and original equipment manufacturers worldwide from this facility. The company has a bicycle museum in Taoyuan City known as "Pacific Cycles Museum".

== History and overview ==
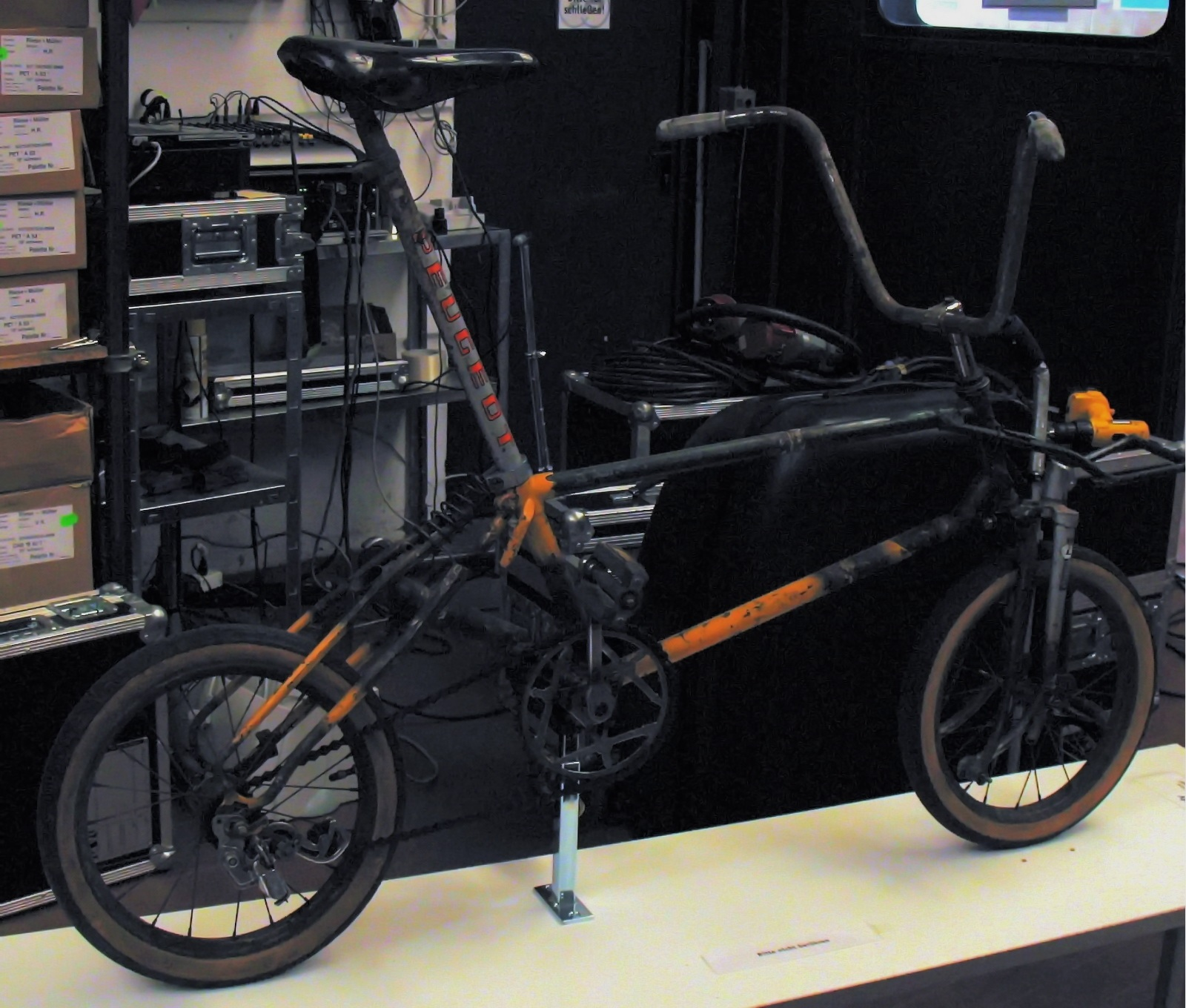
One of the earliest versions of Birdy bike designed in 1995

Pacific Cycles was established in 1980 by George Lin, a Taiwanese entrepreneur. Lin started his career as an English teacher in 1972. He established the company as an ODM with a capital investment of US$ 0.2 million. The company developed a research and development center inside its manufacturing facility later known as the "Section zero" division. One of their first clients was "The Alpha Cycle" which manufactured the cycle brand Lotus during 1982-1983.They also produced "Alenax transbar" bikes around the same time. At present, the company's investment in R&D accounts for 2-3 percent of their annual revenue. "Section Zero" is an evolution from single R&D function to an integrated workshop, founded in 2012.

Pacific Cycles was one of the first companies in cycling industry to use AutoCad in their design process. They started using AutoCad in 1985 to design their bicycle. In 1988, they introduced 7005 aluminium alloy frame bikes in Taiwan and introduced twin shock full suspension bike in 1992. Their first successful self manufactured bicycle was "the Birdy", launched in 1995 which increased the capitalization of the company to US$ 3 million.

In 1998 they set up their first CNC machine shop for faster prototyping of bicycles. In 2005, they released their "the CarryMe", a micro-folder bicycle designed by George Lin. Their "iF Mode" bicycle brand was introduced in July 2007, and won the "iF Award Gold" in 2009. In 2012 they started 3D scanning and rapid prototyping to design their bikes.

In 2010, they opened "Pacific Cycles Museum" in Xinwu, Taoyuan City.

== Bikes ==
=== Folding Bikes ===
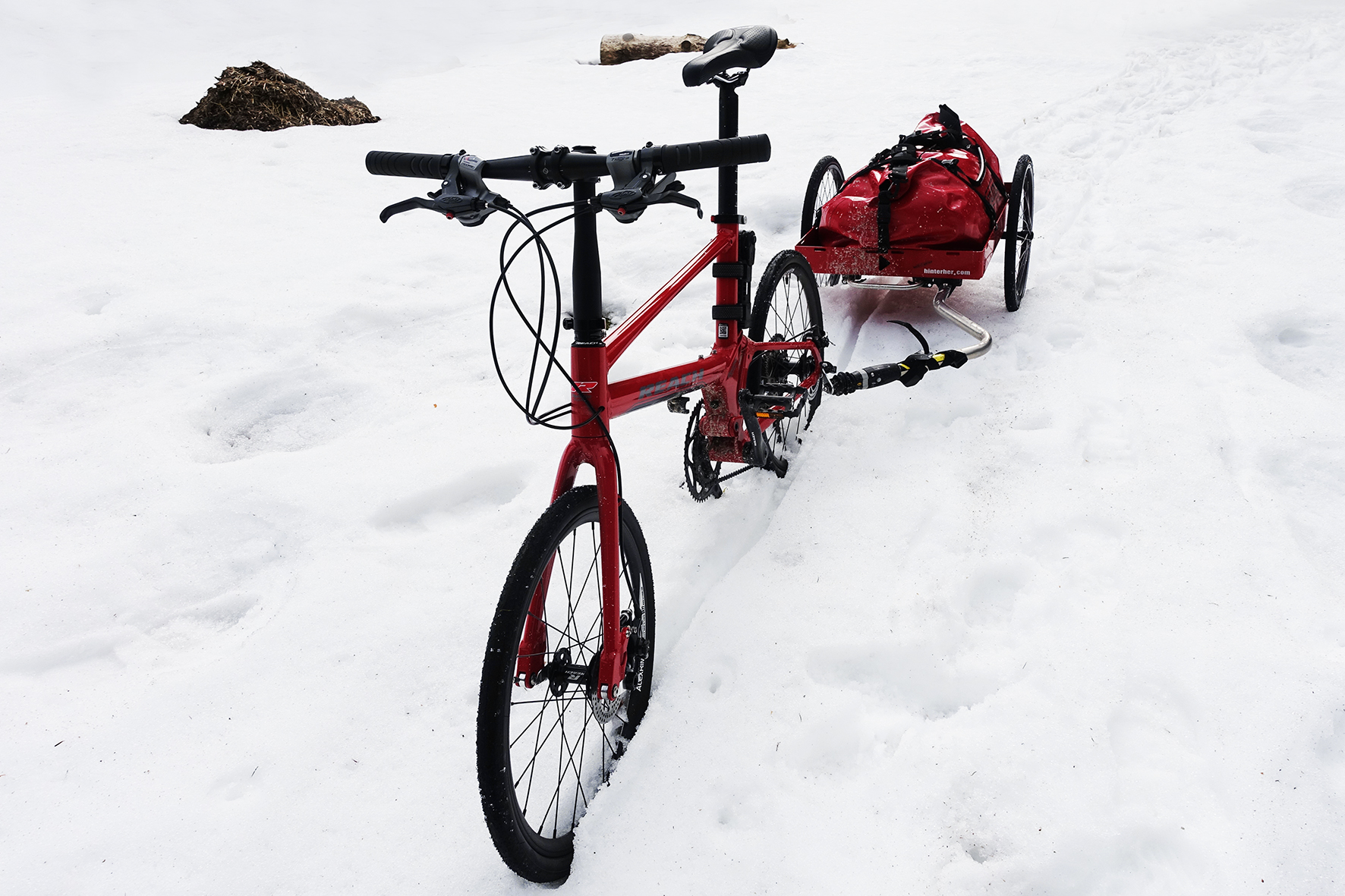
- Reach bicycle
  "Birdy" - is a folding bicycle produced by Pacific Cycles which was first released in 1995 and designed by Riese und Müller. It was the first 18" fully suspended folding bike manufactured by the company.
- "Reach" - is a folding bike with triangular frame design and 20" (ISO size 451) wheels was released in 2003 by the company. It was tested in various triathlon competitions including Beijing to Xinjiang, Kazakhstan to Turkey, Turkey to Netherlands, and Washington DC to Seattle in USA with a total of 25,000 km in distance. It has three variants: STD, GV, and Frameset.
- "CarryMe" - is an aluminum body lightweight folding bicycle with 8-inch pneumatic tires introduced in 2006. It was designed and developed by George Lin in their R&D center. By early 2008, Lin, then 70 years old, had ridden his own CarryMe more than 2,000 miles.
- "IF" - is a type of quickly foldable bicycle released in 2007. It has a 3 dimensional folding mechanism that swing-folds over on itself in a single action to bring the two magnetized wheels together. One of the variation this bike named "IF Mode" was awarded the Gold Award for Product Design in 2009 by iF Industrie Forum Design e.V. of Germany. The bicycle also won a Eurobike Award in 2008. MODE was designed by Mark Sanders (designer), Michael Lin and Ryan Carroll. another variant known as IF MOVE was developed by CTO Kain Galliver, a previous mountain bicycles designer and Stijn Deferm, a 3 time Belgium downhill mountain bike champion.

=== Electric bikes ===
- "Moove" - is a monocoque electric bicycle with BOSCH mid-drive, and frame-integrated lithium battery.
- "Urbane Design" - CV200 and CV160. CV200 is a compact cargo bike weighing under 30 kg with a 200 cm frame, featuring a 16-inch front wheel and 20-inch rear wheel for agile, responsive handling. Compatible with soft bags and versatile basket racks, it adapts easily to various use cases. CV160 is a stylish, lightweight 24-inch e-bike weighing just 19.5 kg, with a 160 kg load capacity. Its Shimano 9-speed drivetrain and hydraulic brakes ensure smooth, safe riding for daily commuting on city streets or rural trails.
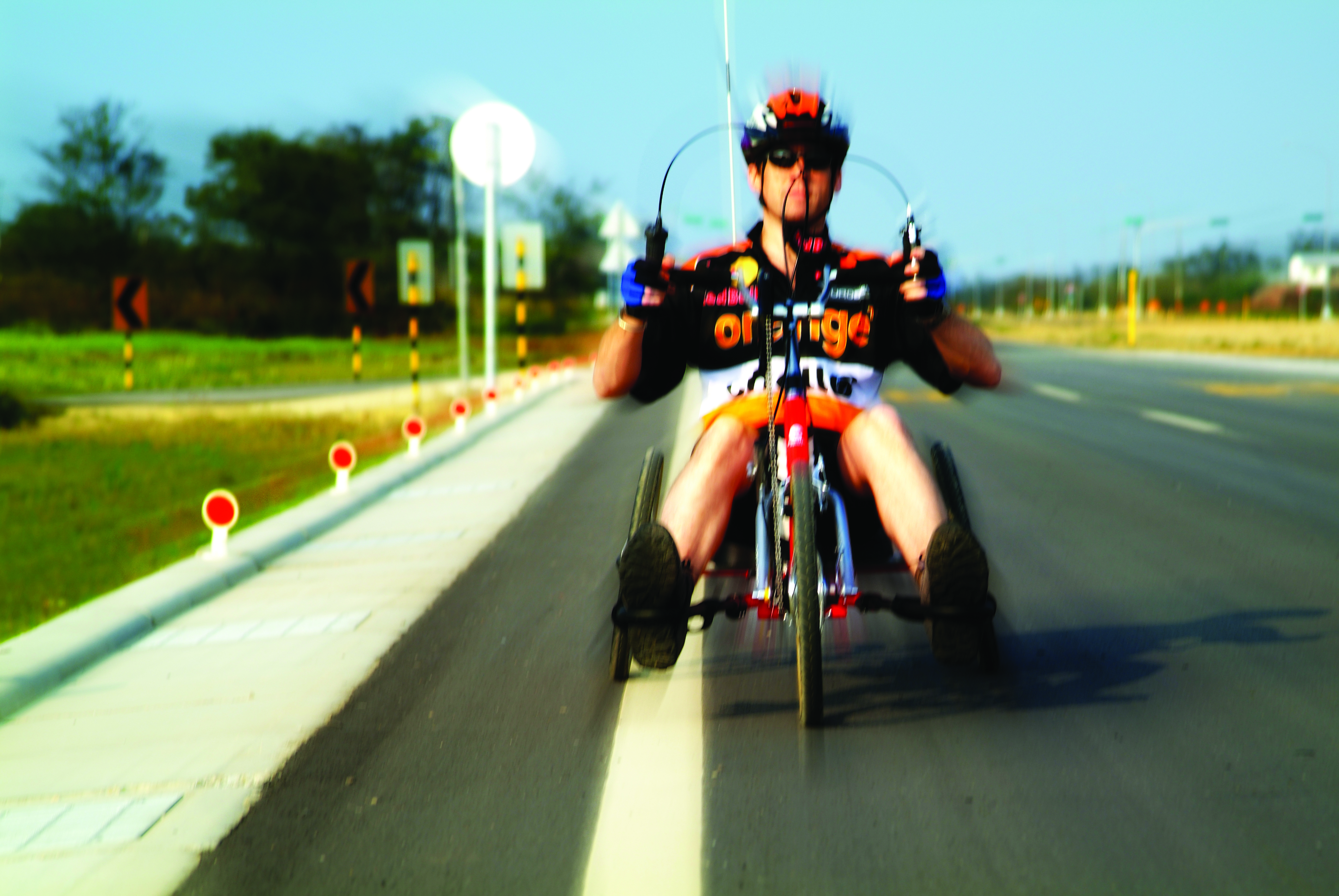
  A hand driven bike designed by Pacific Cycles for physically challenged people.

=== Special bikes ===
In addition to two wheeler folding cycles, the company manufactures tricycles, hand-cycles and other special bikes for multiple passenger carrying, and also for people with disability.

== Pacific Cycles Museum ==
The company turned its old office building in Taoyuan into a bicycle museum in 2010 and named "Pacific Cycles Museum" in order to preserve historical items related to bicycles. According to the company around 8,000 visitors around the world visit the museum each year. The museum has a collection of several vintage bicycles including classic European bikes manufactured before WW1, a steel penny-farthing's replica, an aluminum made Draisine balance bike, old Taiwanese mail bikes and American cruiser bikes. It also has a display of over 150 types of bike designs, in which more than 80 percent are products developed over the past 40 years, as a proprietary brand or for other brandings. It also has some of the current designs for display. The Museum was moved to their new manufacturing facility in 2014 and continues its expansion. It is certified as a Tourism Factory by the Ministry of Economic Affairs of Taiwan.

== Section Zero ==
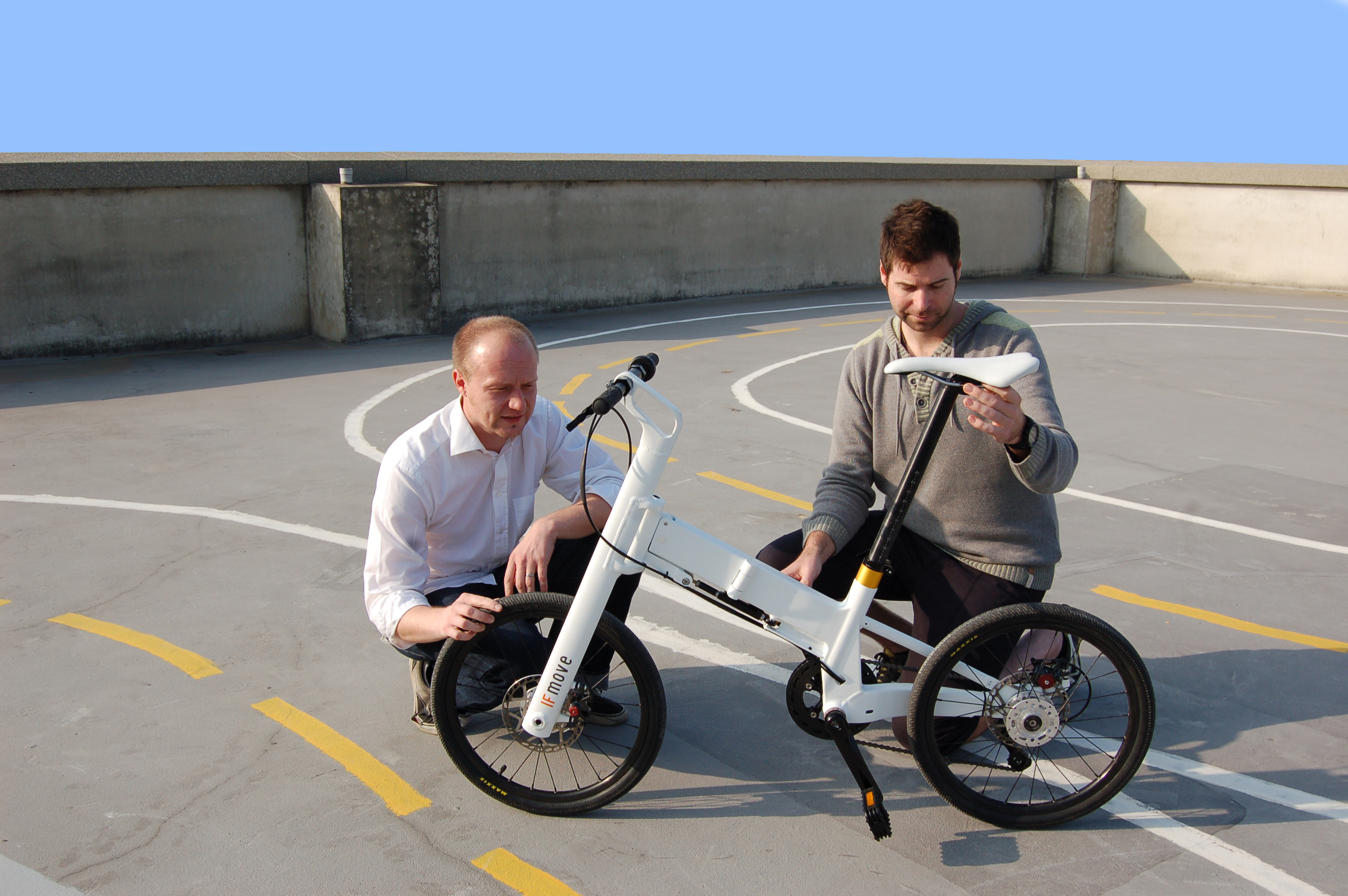
Bicycle testing at Section Zero

Research and Development center of the company is known as "Section Zero" previously led by Michael Lin. The section was founded as a single R&D facility in 2012 and later converted into an integrated design shop. Most of their notable designs including 2013 IF MOVE, Mando Footloose and the 2015 BIRDY 3rd generation all designed by Section Zero.
