= Yadea G5 =

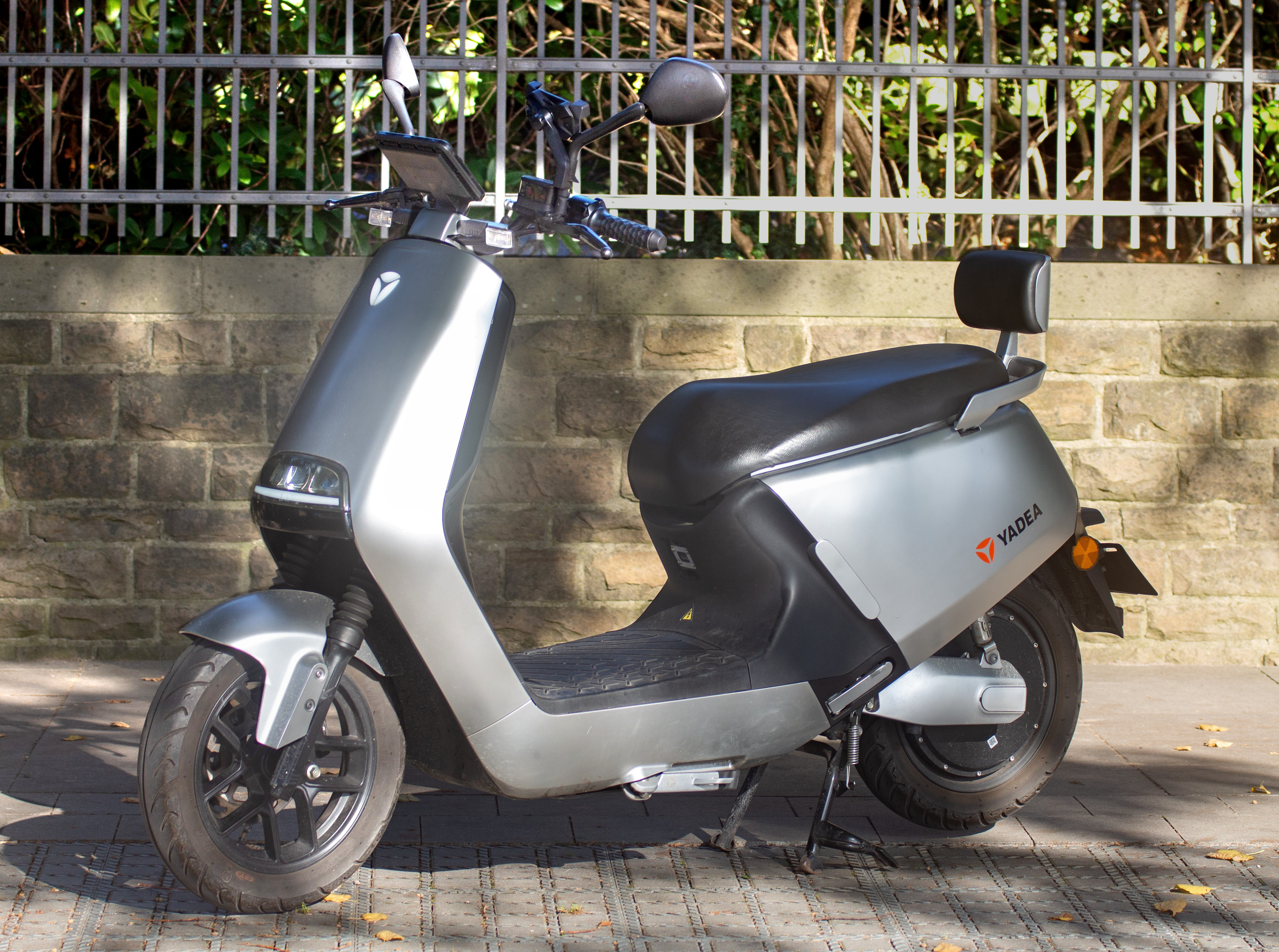
- Manufacturer: Yadea
- Production: 2021-present
- Class: Electric scooter

The Yadea G5 is an electric scooter produced by Yadea. It was presented at EICMA in November 2018 and it went on sale in 2021. The G5 is offered in three versions, The G5, which has a top speed of 45 km/h (28 mph), G5 Pro with twice the range and G5S, which has a maximum speed of 80 km/h (50 mph).

== Design ==
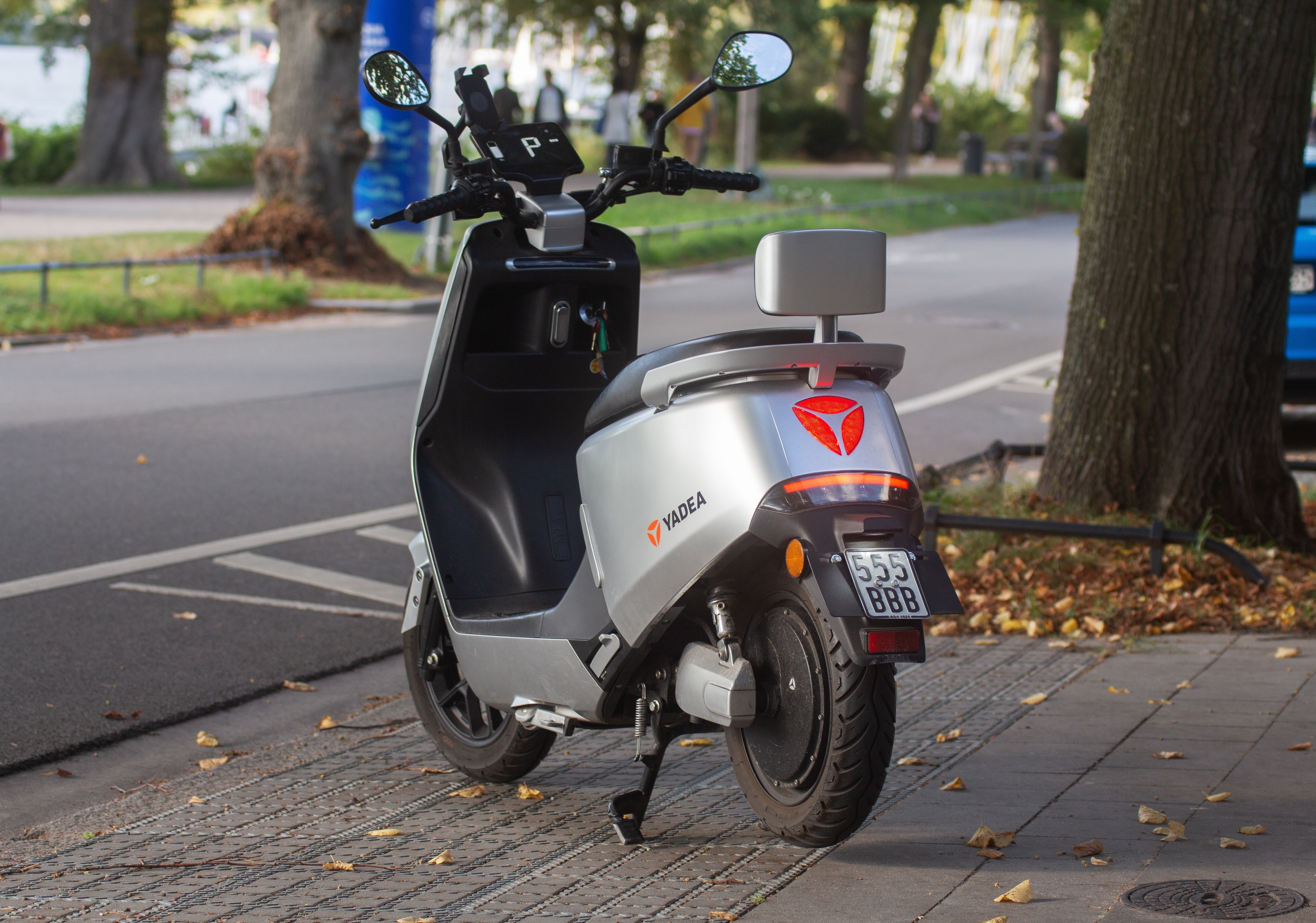
Rear view of the G5

The G5 has a tubular steel frame. The rear swing arm is made of aluminum. The storage compartment under the seat holds 26 liters. The battery of the G5 is located under the footrest and, like every battery of the G5 Pro, should be charged in a maximum of 8 hours. The batteries under the footrest and under the seat of the G5S should be fully charged in four to six hours.

All G5 models have 12-inch wheels and a 30 mm telescopic fork at the front. Braking is done with hydraulic disc brakes at the front and rear; whose diameter is 220 mm. So far there is no ABS, but there is a combined braking system that distributes the braking force to the front and rear.

In all G5 models, the battery can be removed to charge it in the home. All have a 7-inch display, which is color on the G5S. In addition, the G5S can be started without a key (Keyless Go).
