= Eurobike =

Coordinates: 47°40′39″N 9°30′22″E

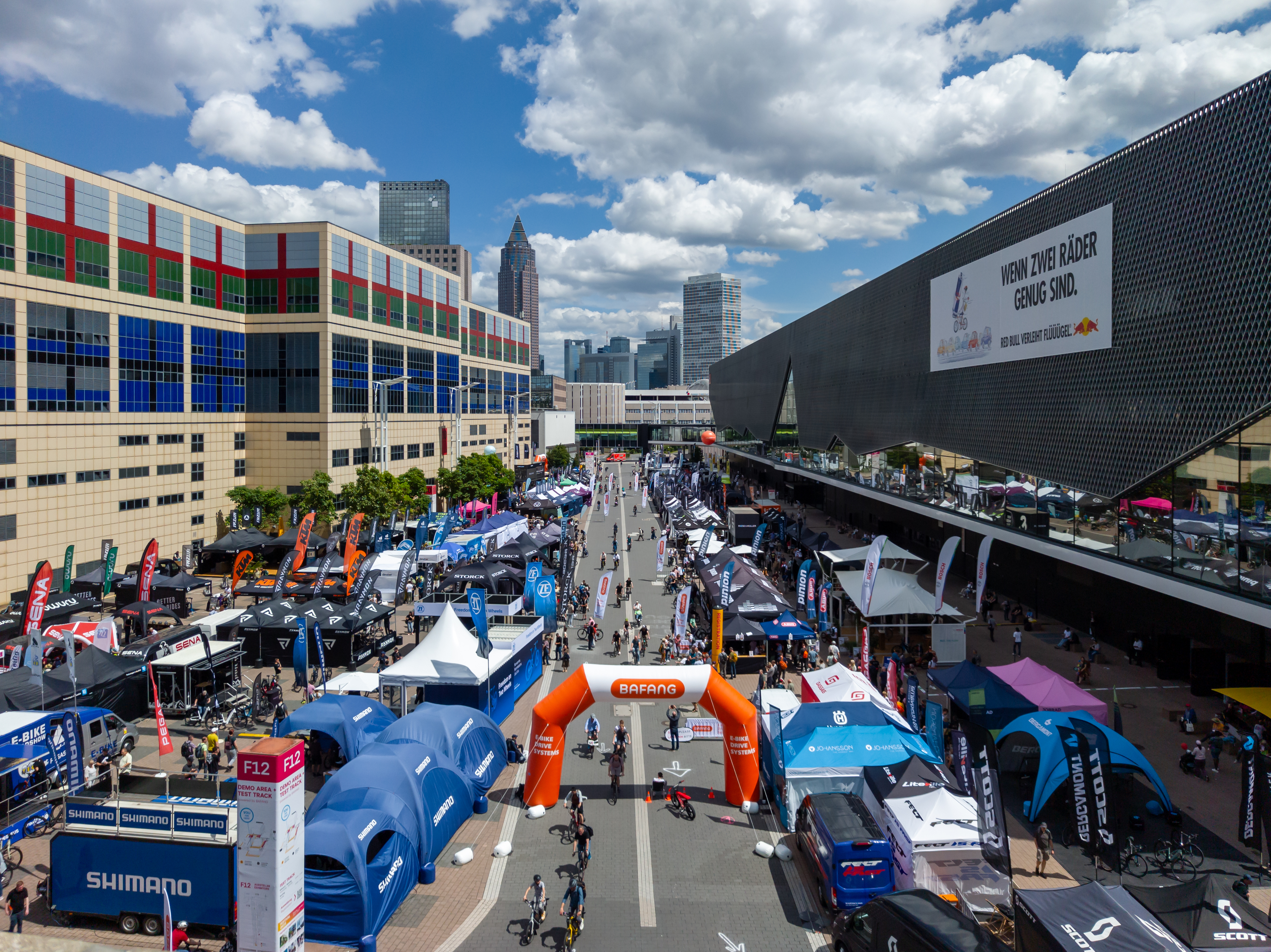
Demo Area and Test Track at Eurobike 2024

Eurobike is an international bicycle trade fair held annually since 1991. Originally staged during the first week of September on the grounds of Messe Friedrichshafen, it moved to Messe Frankfurt in 2022 where it now occurs each July and encompasses various types of 'ecomobility' in addition to bicycles.

The event spans five days, being open to trade visitors from Wednesday to Friday, then to everyone over the weekend.

According to organizers, 43,700 industry visitors from 97 countries and an additional 20,500 bike fans on public day, attended the show in 2012. This also included 1,889 journalists from 42 countries.

== Demo Day ==
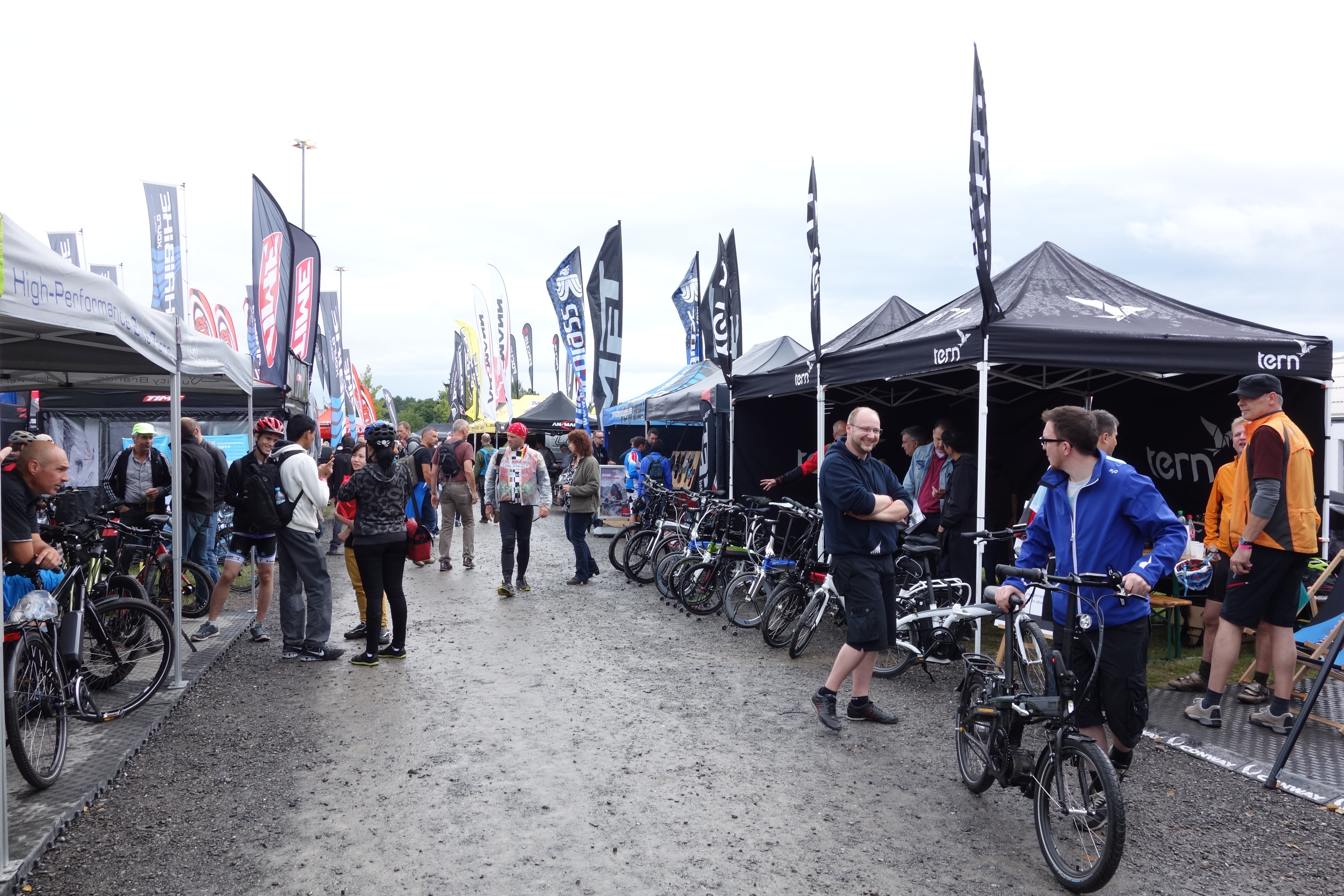
Outdoor Demo Day at Eurobike 2014

A day before the indoor exhibition starts, a one-day "Demo Day" is held where people can test ride a variety of the latest products that vendors will be displaying at the show. Starting in 2014, the Outdoor Demo was moved to an area just outside the exhibition halls whereas in years past it was held in the town of Argenbühl just outside Friedrichschafen. The new Outdoor Demo area includes a MTB test track as well as 12 miles of paved road for road and ebikes (electric bikes) .

== Eurobike Award ==
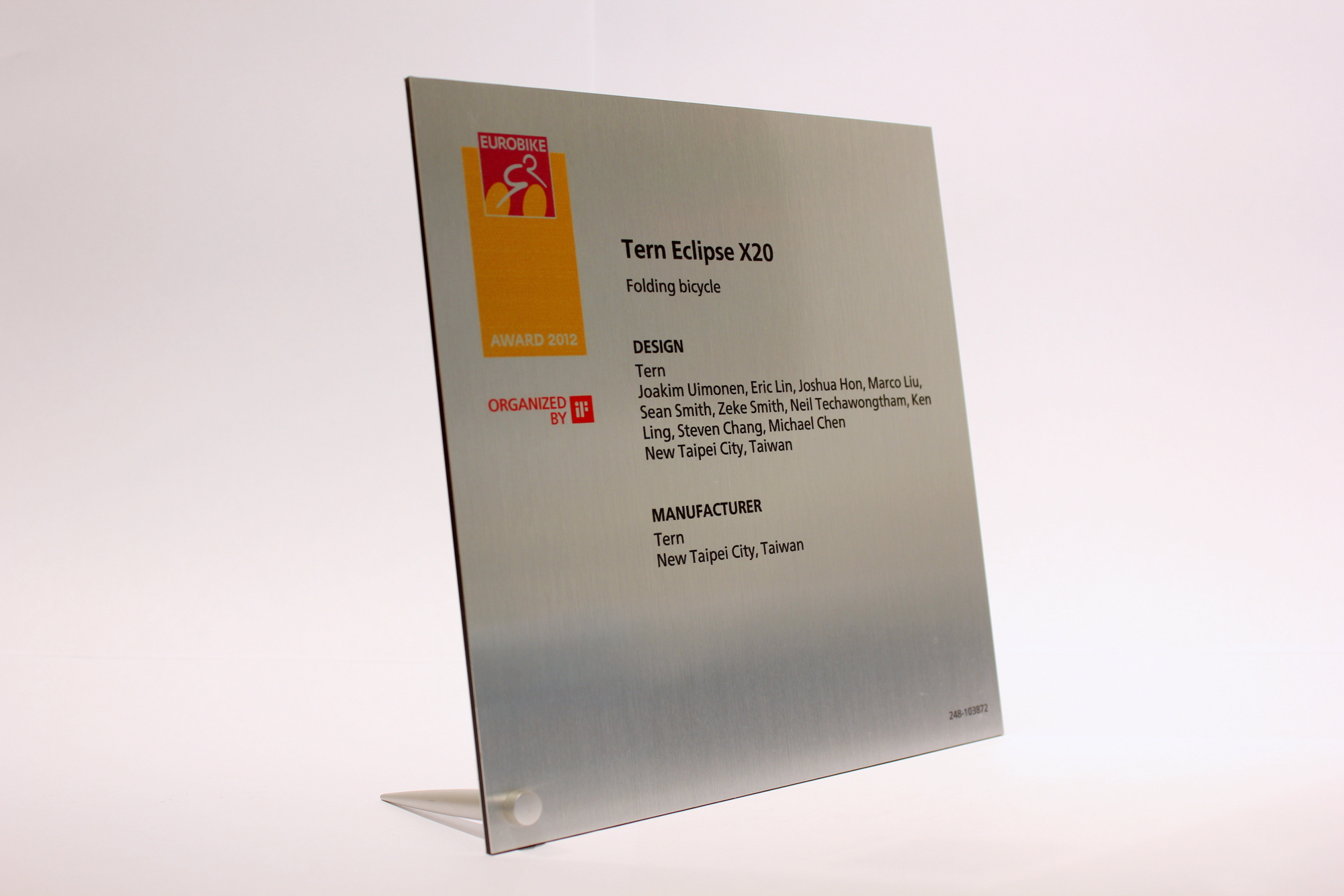
2012 Eurobike Award plaque

Every year, winners of a Eurobike Award are announced at Eurobike. Awards and are given to companies and organizations that focus on the development and design of bicycles and cycling accessories, from mountain bikes and special bikes to individual components, clothing and accessories. Up until 2014, the awards were organized by iF design, a German-based design services organization. Starting in 2014, however, the Eurobike Awards were organized by The Deutsche Designer Club (DDC).

== Fashion Show ==
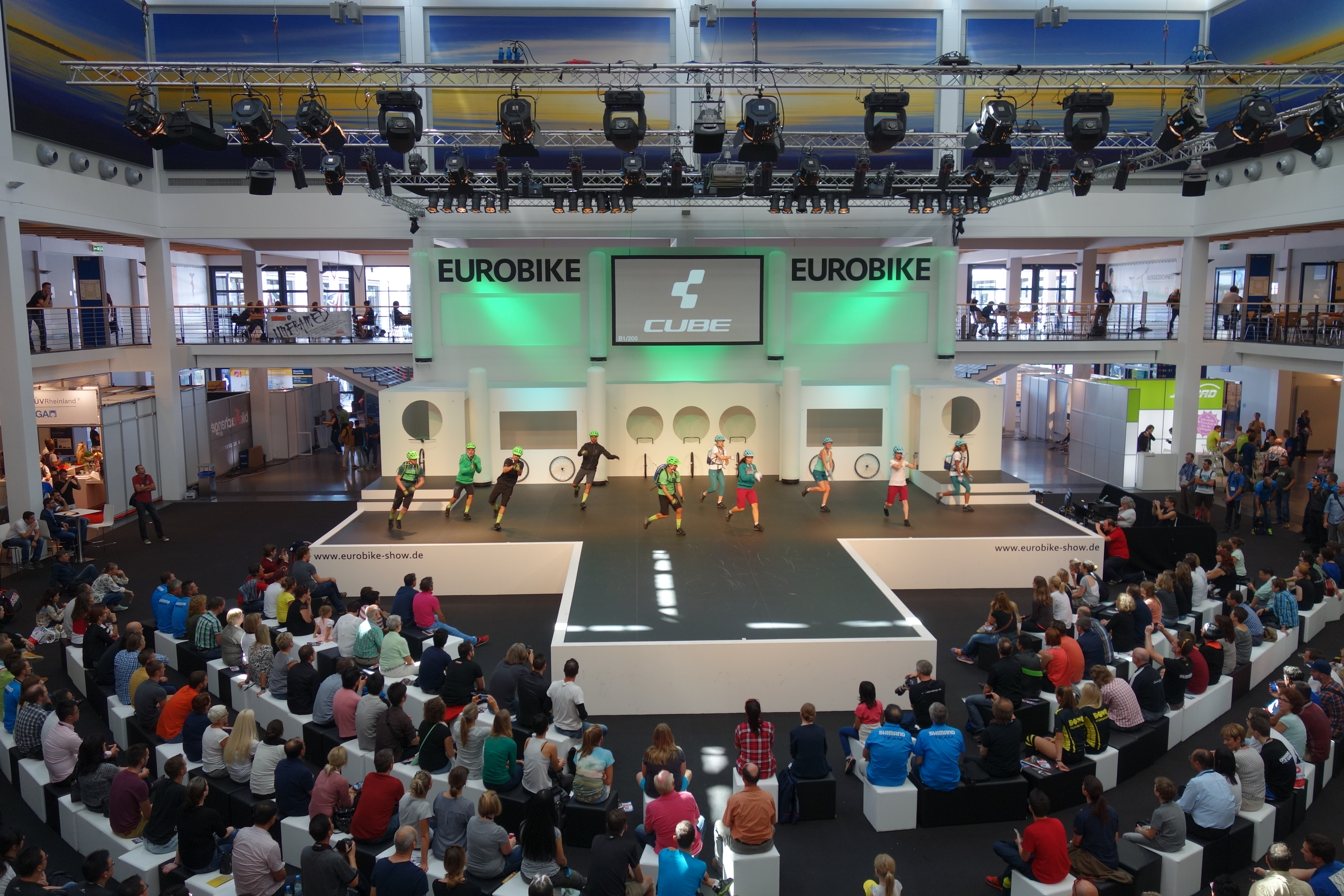
Fashion Show at Eurobike 2014

A fashion show is performed each year and features a choreographed performance by dancers showing off highlight bicycles, accessories, and clothing from the show.

== See also ==
- Interbike
- Taipei International Cycle Show
