= Grout (disambiguation) =

Grout is a construction material.

Grout may also refer to:

== People ==
- Abel Joel Grout, (1867–1947), American botanist
- Daniel A. Grout (1862-1929), Canadian-born educator in Portland, Oregon
- Donald Jay Grout (1902-1987), American musicologist
- Edward M. Grout (1861–1931), American lawyer and New York City Comptroller
- Frank Fitch Grout (1880–1958), American geologist
- Jack Grout (1910-1989), American professional golfer best known as the ‘first and only’ golf teacher of Jack Nicklaus
- James Grout (born 1927), English television and radio actor
- John William Grout (1843–1861), American Civil War officer about whom the poem "The Vacant Chair" was written
- Jonathan Grout (1737–1807), United States Representative from Massachusetts
- Josiah Grout (1842-1925), American Civil War veteran, lawyer, politician, and Governor of Vermont
- Julia Grout (1898–1984), American physical educator
- Ruth Ellen Grout (1901–1998), American health educator, sister of Julia Grout
- W. H. J. Grout (1839-1915), British inventor and manufacturer of high wheel bicycles
- Wally Grout (1927-1968), Test cricketer for Australia and Queensland
- William W. Grout (1836-1902), U.S. Representative from Vermont
- William L. Grout (1833-1908), American industrialist and co-founder of the White Sewing Machine Company (ancestor of the White Motor Company)
  - C. B. Grout, American industrialist and co-founder of the Grout Brothers Automobile Co. (1900-1912); son of William L. Grout
  - Carl Grout, American industrialist and co-founder of the Grout Brothers Automobile Co.; son of William L. Grout
  - Fred Grout, American industrialist and co-founder of the Grout Brothers Automobile Co.; son of William L. Grout

== Other uses ==
- Grout (automobile), early automobiles manufactured by the Grout brothers in Orange, Massachusetts
- Grout Township, Michigan, United States
- Harry Grout, a character in the BBC sitcom Porridge
- The Grout, a make-believe character in Diary of a Wimpy Kid: Wrecking Ball
