= Zike =

Zike may refer to:

- Zike (company) - makes hybrid scooters
- Zike, Liberia
- the Sinclair Zike bicycle
