= William Grout =

William Grout may refer to:

- William L. Grout (1833–1908), American industrialist and manufacturer
- William W. Grout (1836–1902), U.S. Representative from Vermont
- W. H. J. Grout (William Henry James Grout), inventor and manufacturer of bicycles

== See also ==
- John William Grout, soldier killed in the American Civil War, subject of the poem "The Vacant Chair"
