= Portable bicycle =

Bicycle small and light enough to be easily carried

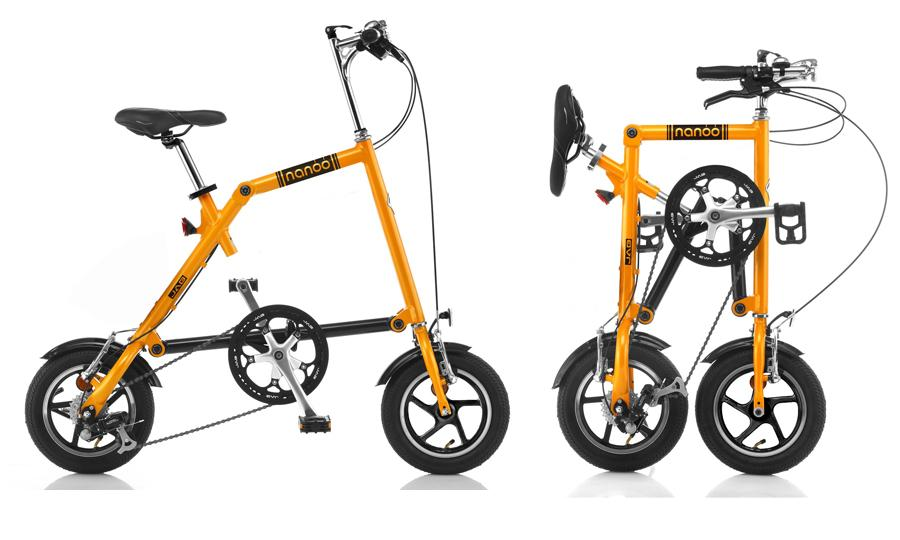
Nanoo folding bicycle, an example of a bike designed to be small and light enough for easy carrying

A portable bicycle is a bicycle that has been designed to be small and light enough for easy carrying. It is usually dismantled to make a convenient bundle and the frame often has a folding action to facilitate this. The design of a portable bicycle involves a trade-off between ease of carrying and ease of riding. With their easy portability and limited ease of riding, folding bikes are often carried on other passenger vehicles and used for shorter rides, for example between a train station and a home or workplace.

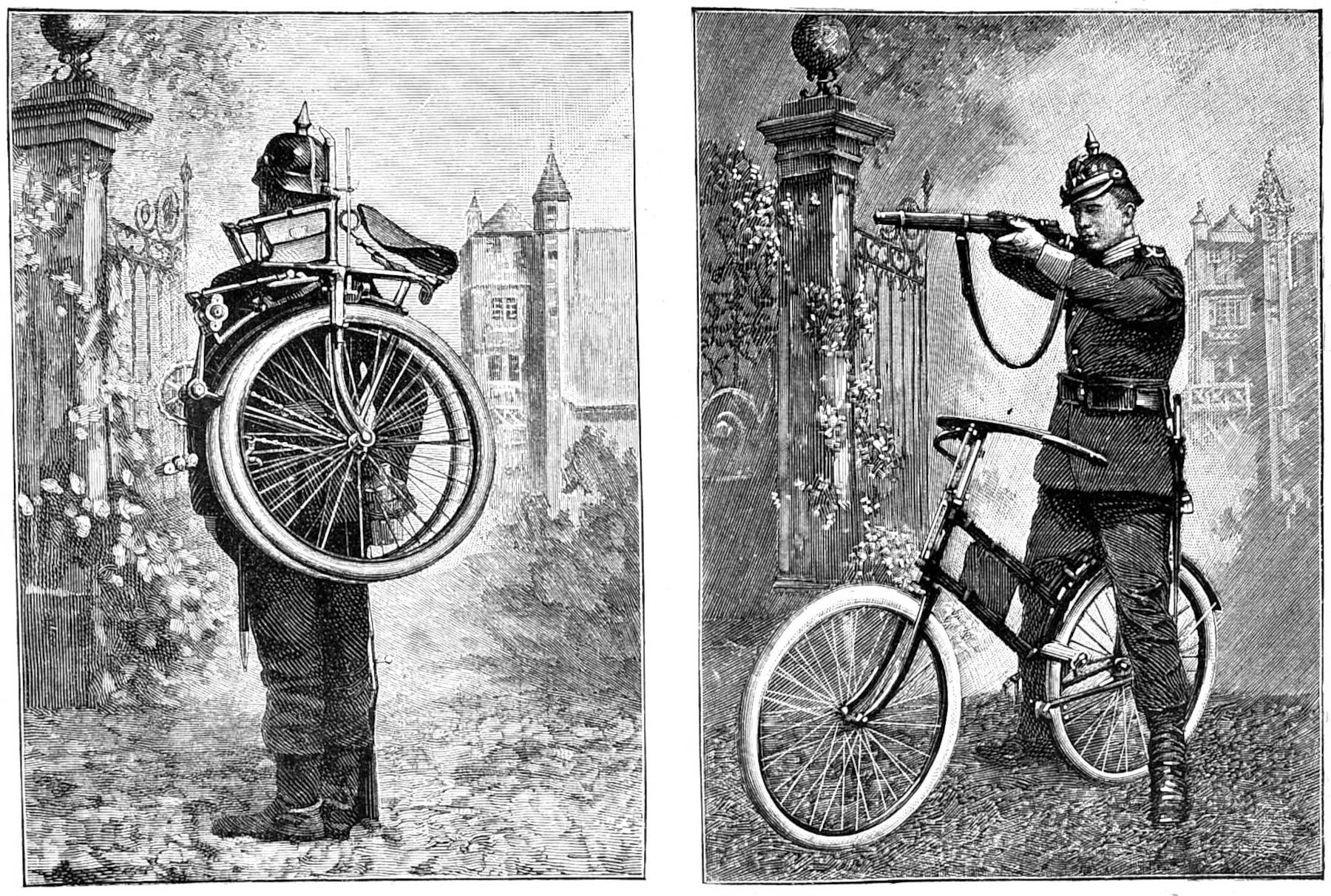
German folding military bicycle, 1896

== History ==
The first popular bicycles were the large penny-farthings. The pioneering inventor, W. H. J. Grout of Stoke Newington, invented a portable version in which the large front wheel could be dismantled into four pieces so that they would fit into a carrying bag.

In the 1890s, Captain Gérard of the 87th Regiment of French Infantry was an advocate of bicycles for military use. To enable his troops to operate in rough terrain, he devised a bicycle which could be folded in two and carried on the soldiers' backs; the weight was between 10-12 kg (22-26¼ lbs). The first time the Gérard portable bicycle was used, it "gave complete satisfaction and justified all expectations". The bicycles were manufactured by Charles Morel who commercialised the type.

In 1919, Charles Haskell Clark of New York City filed a patent (granted in 1921) (patent US1381281) for a portable bicycle that was easy to carry onto trains or street cars. Additional advantages of small wheels, described in the patent, were the reduced interference with skirts and the ability to dodge in and out among the crowd. The December 1919 issue of Scientific American had an article describing Mr. Clark's "city bicycle".

== Riding performance ==
The riding performance of portable bicycles is challenged by the need to make the bike small and light. Rider body weight and size, and road conditions, have a strong impact on design and on performance. Typically, portable bicycles intended for the East Asia market (China, Japan, Korea, Taiwan, ...) can be designed for riders lighter than 80 kg and shorter than 174 cm. Northern Europe and America require designs for riders up to 120 kg and 200 cm. City roads are generally smoother in Asian cities, but the bicycle has to be able to ride in crowded city sidewalks. Many European city streets are paved with cobblestone, so portable bicycles marketed in Europe need to cope with such a pavement. The smaller the diameter of a bicycle wheel, the higher the rolling friction and the rougher the ride, which is a challenge for portable bicycles as well as for kick scooters. New technological solutions are being studied to offer the same rolling friction at smaller wheel diameters.

== Carrying and folding ==
The point at which a folding bicycle can be considered a portable bicycle is not precisely defined, and depends on the user. A benchmark for portability are the Brompton Bicycles, medium-size bicycles (from 9.5 to over 13 kg, depending on model) that fold well and are the world's most numerous built on a single design. A bicycle easier to carry than the Brompton C3 (9.5 kg and 349 mm / 16" wheels) can be considered portable.

Many portable bicycles weigh below 6 kg and fold in less than 20 seconds. Above these figures the risk is that the bicycle is too heavy for easy carrying, or takes an inconveniently long time to fold. Folding and unfolding has to be easier than is needed for ordinary full-size folding bicycles, because portable bicycles are used for shorter trips than full-size folding bikes.

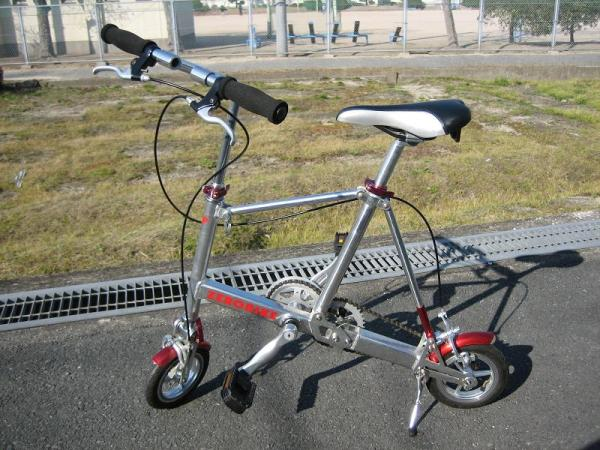
Zerobike

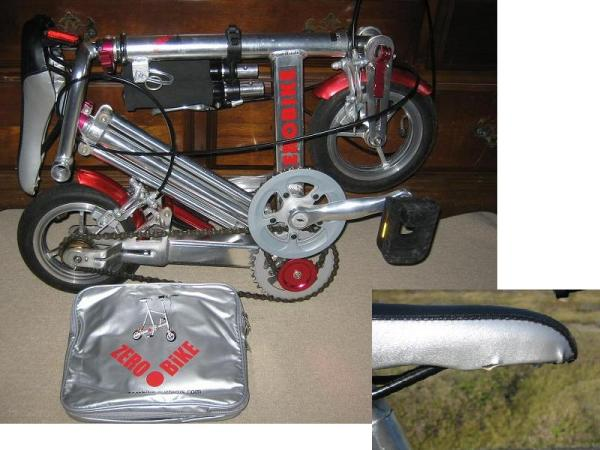
Zerobike folded

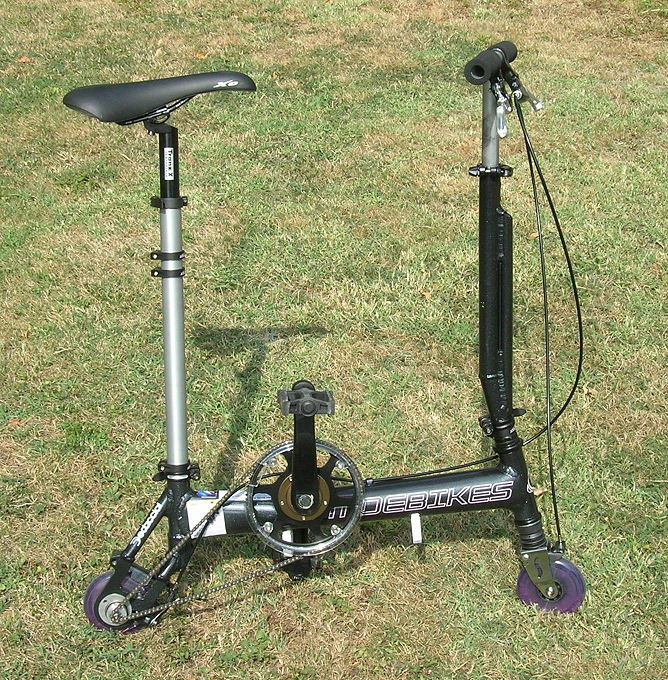
Mini 125

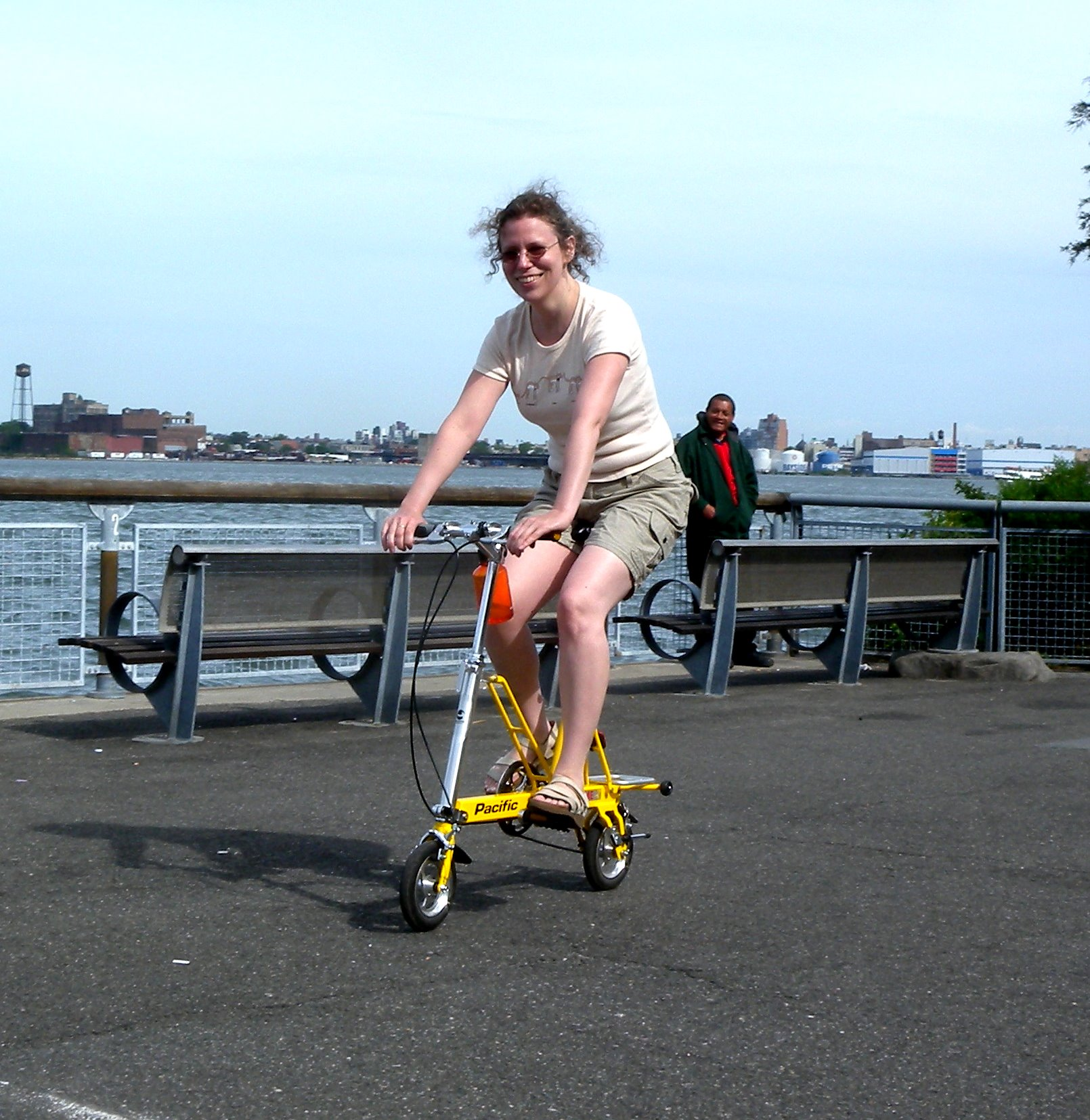
Pacific Cycles CarryMe

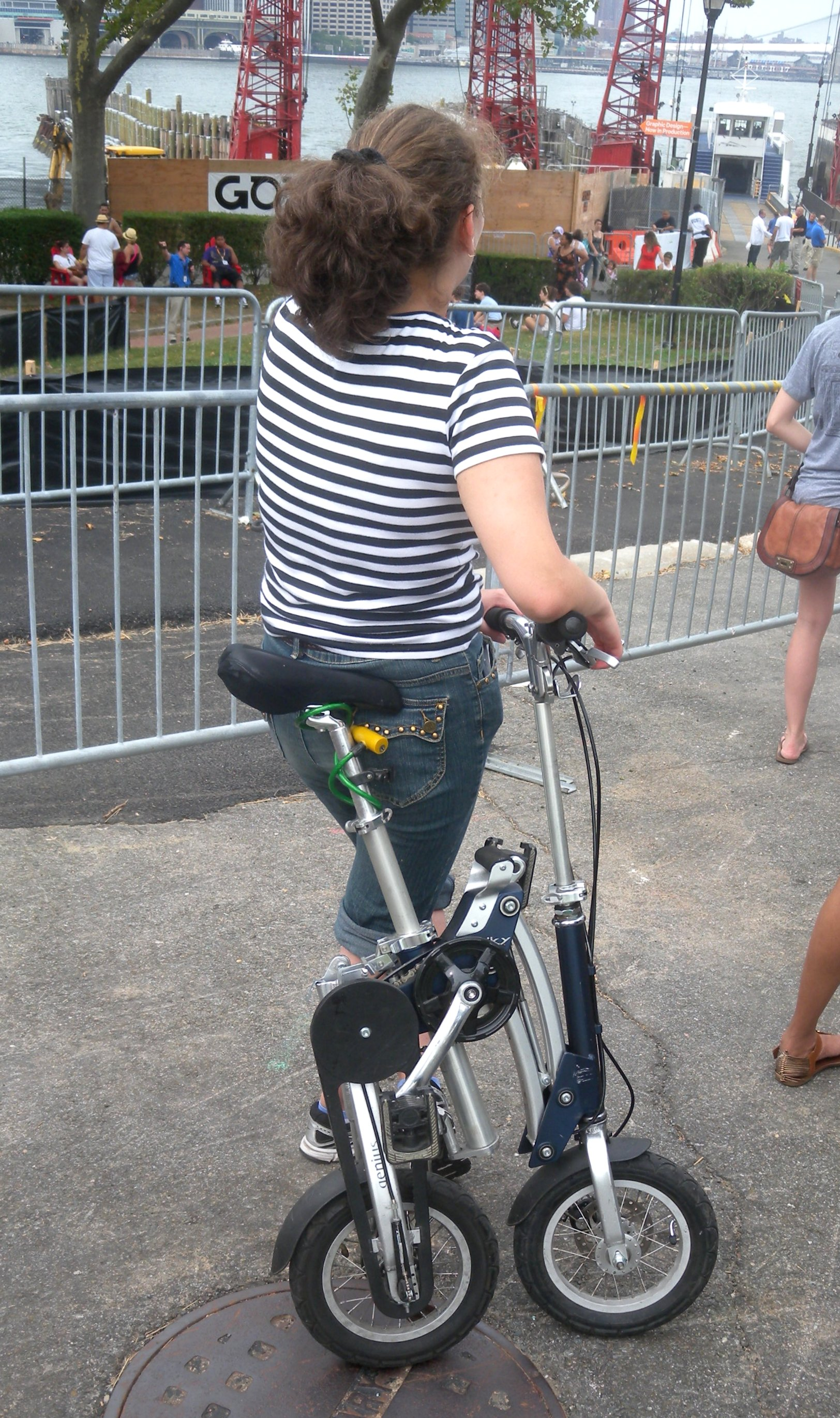
Mobiky

== List of portable bicycles ==
Many portable bicycles are or have been commercially available; they include:

- A-bike (5.7 kg)
- Alessandro Belli Bike
- Mini125 (5.9 kg)
- BikeaPack
- Bickerton portable
- Bike Friday (Oregon)
- Bridgestone
  - Transit Compact
  - Transit Super Lite
- Carry-Me
- Cherubim Ultramini
- Cocolofoo CB-2E
- Frog
- Giatex
- Handybike 8
- JD Bike RB300, R100
- Kahenseki
  - Koma
  - Kallima
- Moulton
- Mobiky
- Panasonic Traincle 6500, 7500
- Piccolino, UGO
- Skoot
- Strida (approx. 10.5 kg)
- Vikkino P
- Zero Bike
- 17bicycle EX Walker

== See also ==
- Kick scooter, vehicle where the operator stands on a platform and propels it forward by pushing off the ground with their leg
- Outline of cycling
- Small-wheel bicycle, an adult bicycle with relatively small wheels, usually 406 mm (20")
