= Mini125 =

Portable bicycle designed by Giuseppe and Paolo Ganio

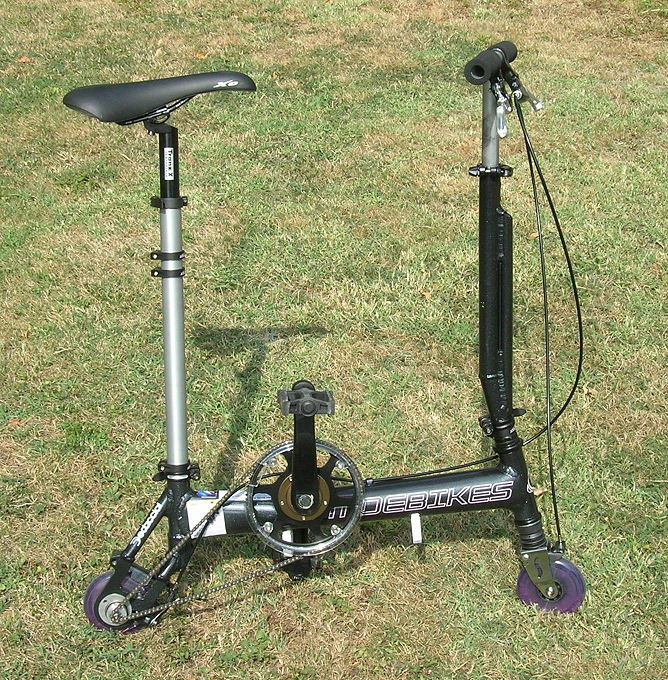
Mini125, unfolded

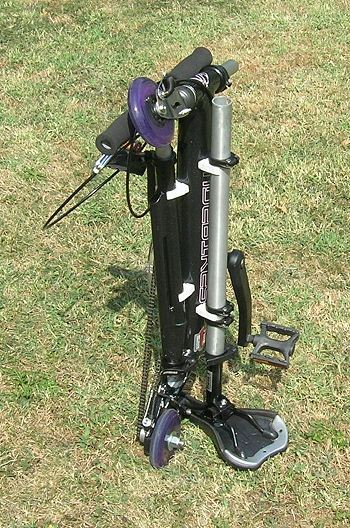
Mini125, folded

The Mini125 is a design of portable bicycle. The current production features four models that have the same frame design but different wheels. The standard model weighs 5.9 kg, folds into a 73 cm × 36 cm × 22 cm package and has polyurethane wheels of diameter 125 mm or 110 mm. The gear assembly is typical of city bikes, while the transmission uses a minimoto chain and pinion. Mini125 is marketed under the MDEbikes brand and was released and presented at the 2003 Handmade Bicycle Show of Tokyo. The bike is designed and developed by Giuseppe and Paolo Ganio of Turin, Italy. (Giuseppe is also an entrepreneur at it:Mdebikes, Alpignano, Italy.)

The Mini125_100 has 100 mm diameter wheels, the smallest in the world on a riding bicycle. Made of high-rebound polyurethane, they achieve low rolling friction despite the small diameter. Another model, Mini125_p, features pneumatic tires for riding in historic city districts. The Mini125 was originally designed with roller ski wheels, the only 100 mm quality polyurethane wheels then available. Polyurethane kick scooters wheels became available during development. Since inline speed skates began using larger wheels, such as 100 mm and 110 mm, the Mini125 can use those.

== Technical specification ==
- Weight: 5.9 kg
- Wheel diameter: 125 mm or 110 mm
- Wheel tire: PU super high rebound
- Transmission: 84x8T with free wheel
- Dimensions when folded: 73 cm × 36 cm × 22 cm
- Rider weight: up to 80 kg
- Rider height: 110 cm to 190 cm

== See also ==
- A-bike
