= Strida =

Folding bicycle design

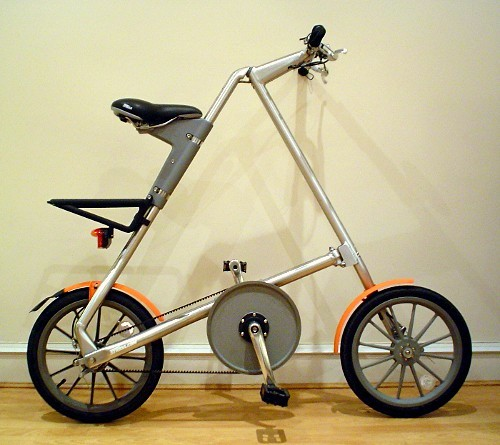
Strida 3 (upgrade kit installed)

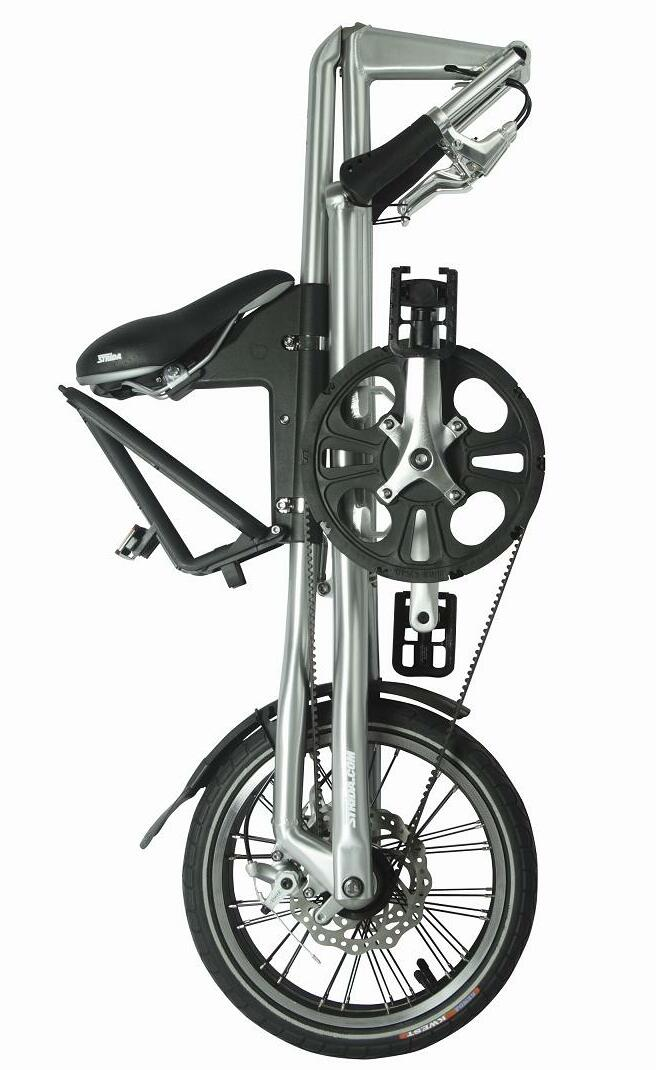
Strida 5 Folded

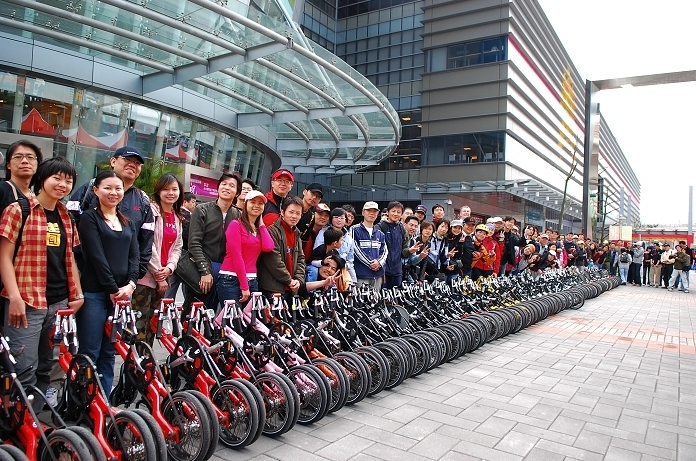
Strida owners in Taipei

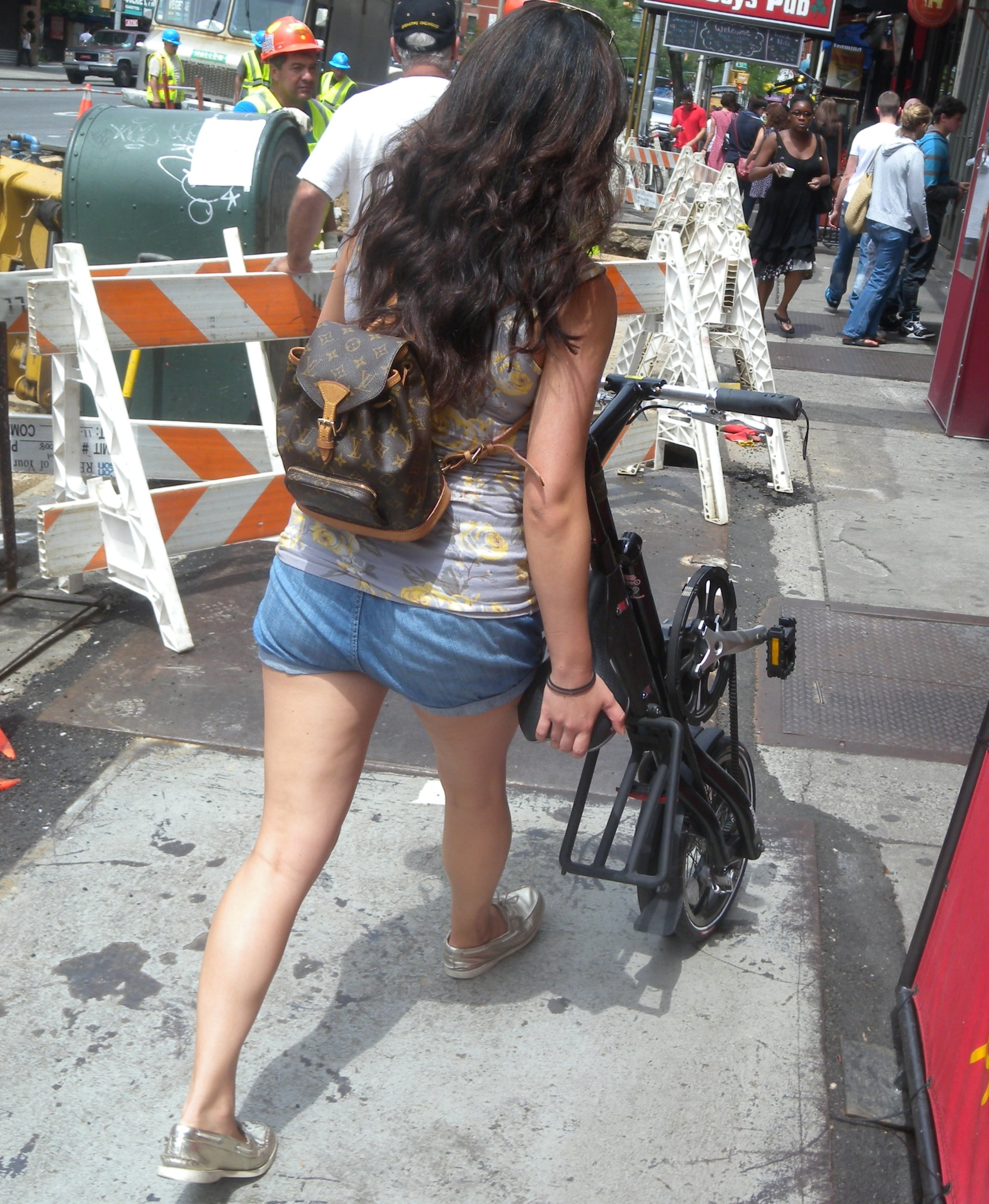
The folded bike - a "wheeled walking stick"

Strida is a portable belt-driven folding bicycle with a distinctive A-shaped collapsible frame, designed by British engineer and designer Mark Sanders. The first model, Strida 1, was released in 1987 and the latest, Strida 5.2, in 2009. The mass is around 10.5 kg depending on model.

== Advantages ==
The Strida folds into a "wheeled walking-stick" that can be pushed along, much like a folded pram/baby-buggy whose folding concept provided the inspiration for the design.

Other notable characteristics include:

- a greaseless kevlar belt that replaces the traditional chain drive to avoid mess (see belt-driven bicycle)
- minimalist design (single speed, aluminium-triangle frame, etc.)
- low-maintenance brakes (drum brakes on the Strida 1, 2 and 3; disc brakes on the Strida 5 and later versions)
- ETRTO 305 mm (16") wheels, upgradable to 355 mm (18") wheels.

== Disadvantages ==
The single sided wheel mountings and belt drive make fitting gears (e.g. derailleur or hub gears) more difficult than on chain driven bikes with conventional forks. The use of front mounted Schlumpf gear gets around this problem. Hobbyists in Japan have fitted 5 and 7 speed gears.

== History ==
The Strida was the major project for Mark Sanders's master's degree 1983 to 1985 at Imperial College London, and Royal College of Art. The course, IDE, (Industrial Design Engineering, now called Innovation Design Engineering) was a joint course by both institutions for engineering graduates to specialise in combining creative engineering with creative industrial design. The project is recorded in detail in the master's degree thesis. The aim of the project was to simplify bicycles and especially folding bicycles. It was inspired by the Maclaren baby buggy which folds into a thin form, with its wheels together at the end, so that it can be rolled instead of being carried.

In 1985, Industrial Property Rights Ltd, (run by James Marshall, former manager of golfer Greg Norman) licensed the design. The name 'Strida' was suggested by the 8-year-old son of one of the company directors; this was adopted as it was preferred to the suggestion 'Blake' by a PR consultancy. Production of the Strida 1 started in 1986, originally in Springburn, Glasgow. The Strida was launched in Harrods, London in 1987. Approximately 3,000 Strida 1s were made in Glasgow - these can be recognised by a welded steel rack, later replaced by a nylon injection moulded rack, which latter remains in production.

In 1988, production moved to Long Eaton in Nottingham (near the Raleigh Bicycle Company factory, which by then was in decline). Sturmey-Archer developed a 2-speed, front-mounted gear which was prototyped and tested but never made in production. The Strida won all three UK Cyclex Bicycle Innovation Awards in 1988 (Best New Product, Most Innovative, Best British Design). Approximately 17,000 Strida 1s were made in Nottingham. Most were sold in Japan and UK, with smaller quantities in USA, Australia and Germany.

In 1991, production moved to Casa Hipolito, a Portuguese Manufacturer. At this time Strida Ltd. was developing a baby buggy as a second product.

By 1992, 25,000 Strida 1s had been produced.

In 1993, the British Technology Group BTG, a company that licenses and commercializes medical innovations and other UK technology, controlled the rights to Strida until 1995.

In 1997, Roland Plastics, a UK firm, purchased the rights to produce Strida and moved production back to Wickham market in the UK. It released the Strida 2 a year later.

In 2000, the Strida won I.D. Magazine’s Annual Design Award, Sail Magazine’s Pittman Award for Innovation and Safety, and the British Design Council Millennium product Award. Steedman Bass, of Boston USA, purchased the rights to produce the Strida. With Mark Sanders, Bass began development of the Strida 3 as described by The Open University course 'Design and designing' (T211).

In 2002, in order to meet increased demand, Bass moved production to Taiwanese manufacturer Ming Cycle. Strida 3 was launched, with an inaugural shipment of 2000 units to Italy. Ming began to establish distributorships in Korea, Japan, Netherlands, France and the U.S.A. Development of the Strida 5 started.

In March 2006, Ming Cycle took over ownership of Strida rights.

In November 2006, a Strida 3 was featured on the UK television programme The Gadget Show, alongside the Sinclair A-Bike.

In 2007 the Strida 5 won a design award at the Taipei International Bike Show.

A 2-speed gear option was added in 2009, based on the cableless, Schlumpf front crank operated epicyclic gearbox.

The Strida 5 includes an upgrade kit of the Strida 3, and adds disc brakes, eccentric belt tensioner, metal spoked wheels and high pressure tyres.

== Series ==
The Strida is made by Ming Cycle in Taiwan. There was a key patent which covered the early Strida 1 onwards. The U.S. version of this patent was filed in 1986 and expired in 2006, which means only the mechanism used in Strida 1 and 2 of the product is now in the public domain. Several other aspects of the latest Strida 3 to 5.x versions are currently covered by patents in various countries, including the folding handle bar system US7243573, hub and locking system US7367632, front joint system US7681900, with other patents pending. The Patents, Trademark, Copyright and other IP are owned by Ming Cycle, Taiwan. Some components of the Series 3 to Series 5 machines are interchangeable but other significant components and sub-assemblies are not. Series 5 and Series 4 (Mini) machines have a freewheel mounted in the conventional position on the rear wheel (In Series 3 the freewheel, a commonly available Shimano 18t model, is part of the metal and plastic bottom bracket/crankset assembly) and a metal bottom bracket shell which incorporates an eccentric housing to adjust belt tension. Alternative folding handlebars which give more knee clearance for the taller rider are available for the Series 5; these may be retro-fitted in place of the standard folding handlebars on Series 3 and Series 4 (Mini).

- Strida 1
- Strida 2
  - Strida 2.5 (with folding handlebars)
- Strida 3
  - Strida 3.2 (snubber bearing to prevent drive belt slippage)
  - Strida 3.3 (wire wheels)
- Strida 5
  - Strida Special Edition
  - Strida Elite Edition
- Strida Mini / Strida 4 (for smaller riders)
- Strida SX (with 355 mm or 18" wheels, with upgraded 10 kg rated metal rack and metal butterfly action folding pedals)
- Strida SD (2-speed version)
  - Strida MAS (Mark Sanders Special Edition)
- Strida LT (with glass fiber reinforced nylon wheels)
- Strida EVO (3-speed version with Sturmey Archer kickback bottom bracket, available in 305 and 355 mm (16" and 18") versions, both with the SX's improved rack and pedals.)

A number of unlicensed copies of Strida are manufactured in several countries (China, Thailand), and are sold with names such as "Folding bike Strida" or STRDA. Ming Cycle continuously prosecutes importers of these non-genuine and intellectual property right infringing products. In 2021 Mr Sanders said fakes greatly outnumber genuine Stridas.
