= Mark Sanders (designer) =

British designer and engineer

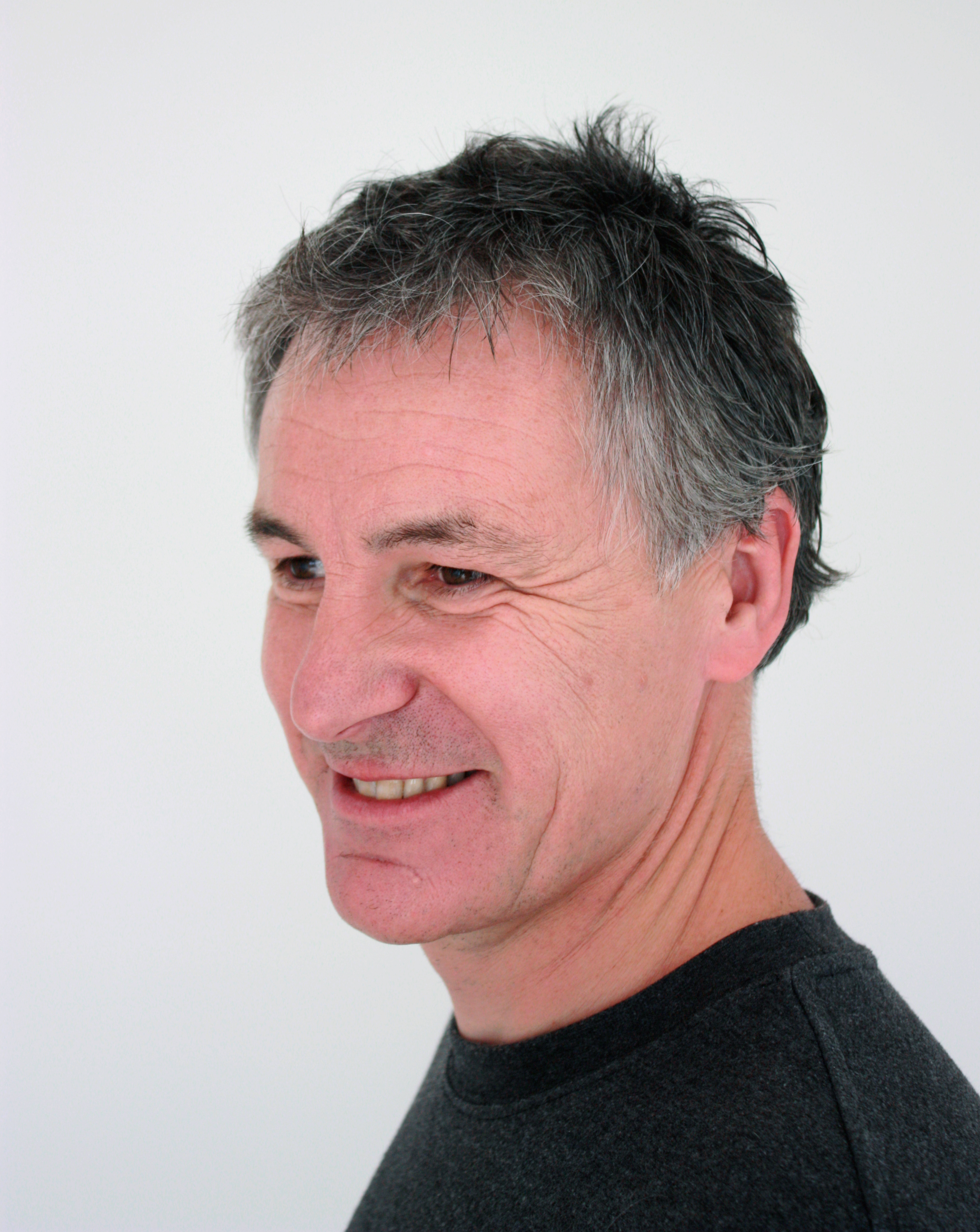
Mark Andrew Sanders

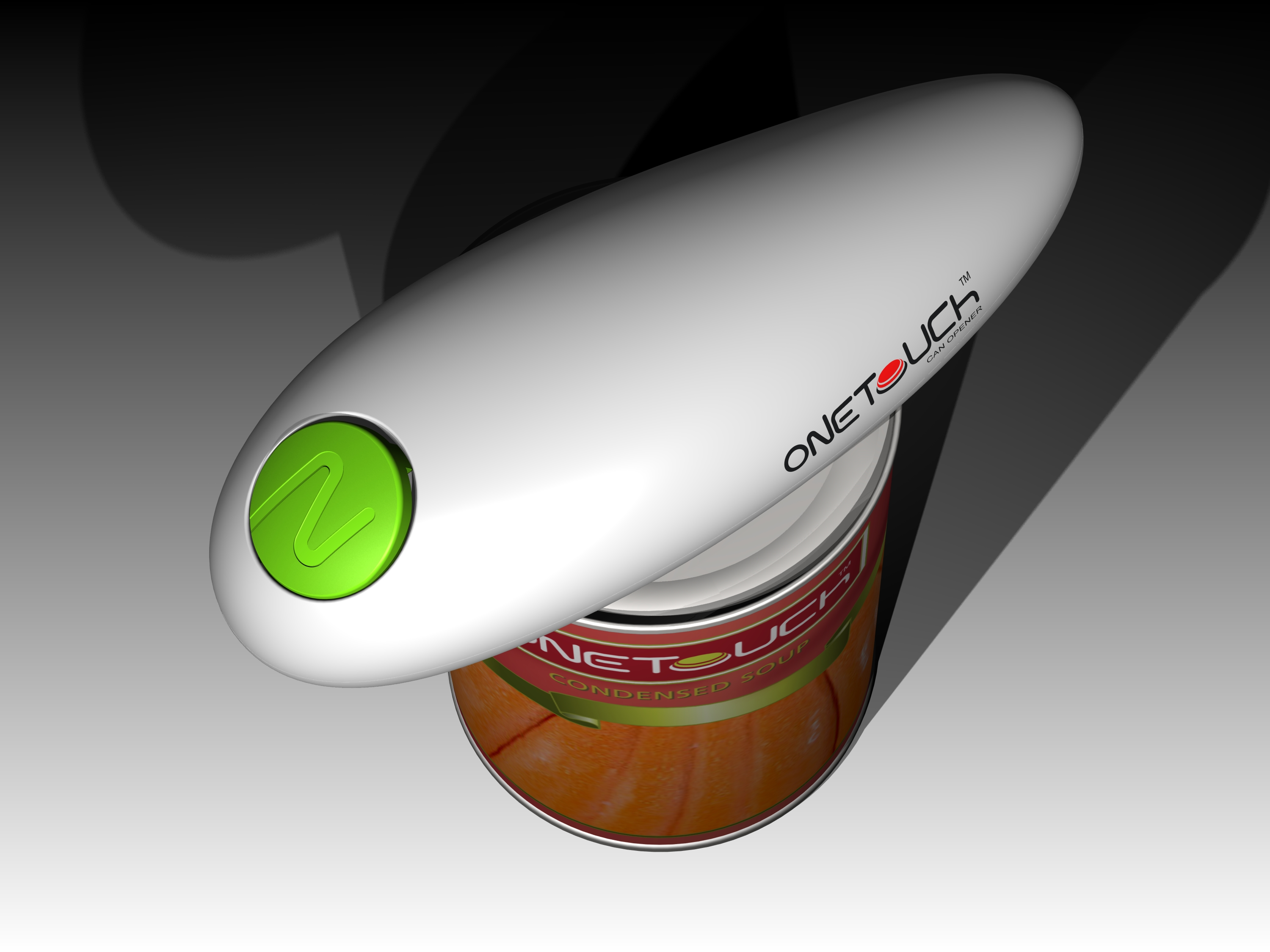
One-Touch Can Opener Designed by Mark Sanders for Daka International.

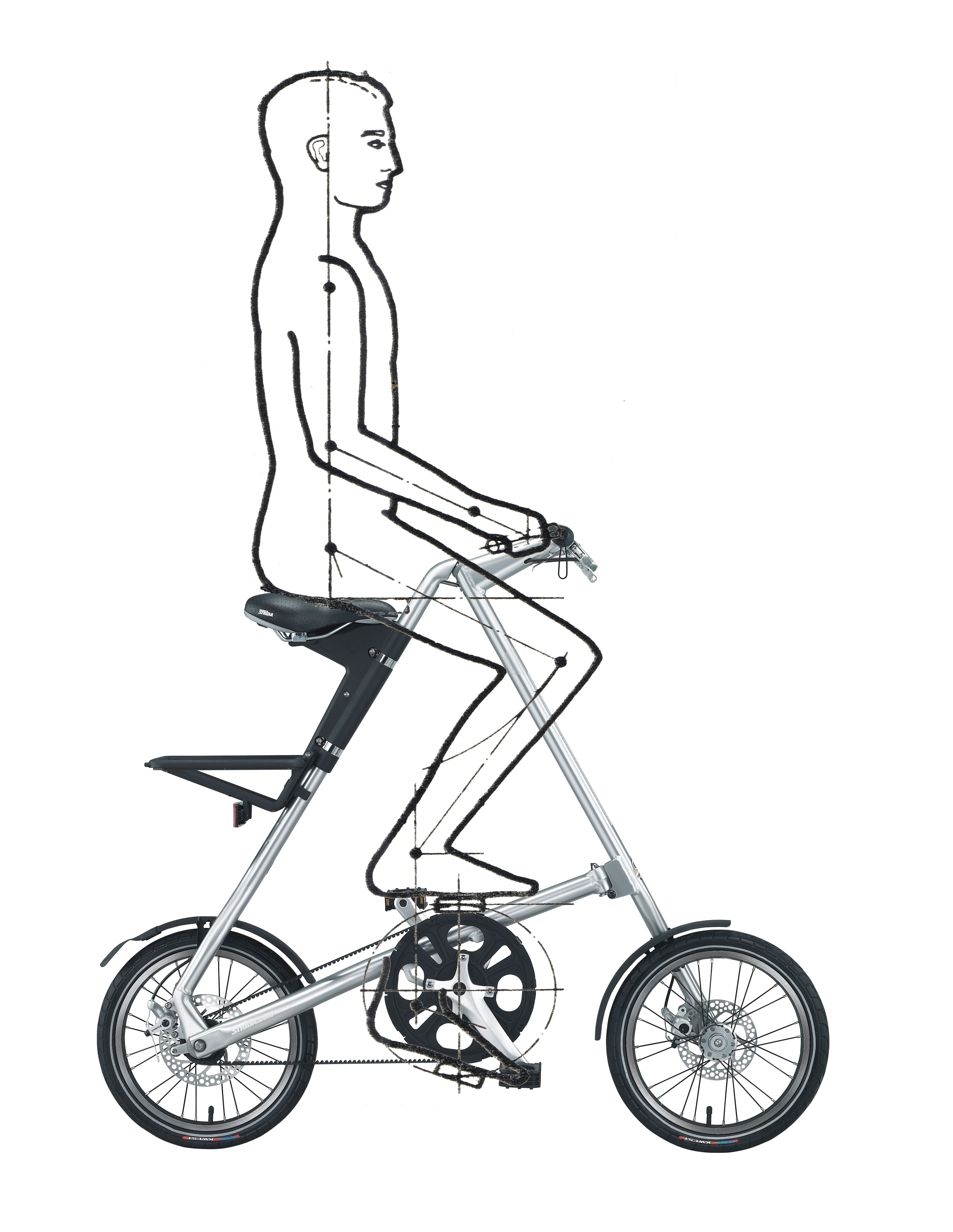
Strida Bicycle with upright riding posture

Mark Andrew Sanders is a British designer and engineer. He is the designer of the Strida triangular folding bicycle, as well as the No-Spill Chopping Board, held in the permanent collection of the Museum of Modern Art.

== Biography ==
Sanders graduated from the Industrial Design Engineering (IDE) course at the Royal College of Art/Imperial College. During his time at RCA, Sanders designed the Strida folding bicycle. The Strida, noted for its simplicity, is featured in the book Fifty Bicycles that Changed the World by Alex Newson.

Sanders is the principal of MAS Design, a product design and engineering consultancy established in 1984.

== Awards ==
In 2009, Sanders was named Design Engineer of the Year at the inaugural British Engineering Excellence Awards.

== Select list of inventions and designs ==
- 1983: Medicine dispenser with automatic dose indicator
- 1985: Strida triangular folding bicycle
- 1988: No-Spill Chopping Board, part of the permanent collection of the Museum of Modern Art
- 2004: iF Mode, with Pacific Cycles, Gold ‘iF Award’ winner, 2013 Red Dot/Taipei Cycle D&I Award winner
- 2006: One Touch Can Opener, 2007 International Design Excellence Awards gold award winner
- 2008: One Touch Jar Opener (later called ‘Robotwist™’), Excellence in Design Awards gold award winner, China's Most Successful Designs Award top 25
- 2012: Mando Footloose, Hybrid Folding Electric Bicycle (Design), 2012 Red Dot 'Best of the Best' Design Award winner
- 2015: Mando Footloose IM, Hybrid Electric Bicycle (Design), Red Dot Design Award 2015 winner
