= A-bike =

British Folding Bicycle

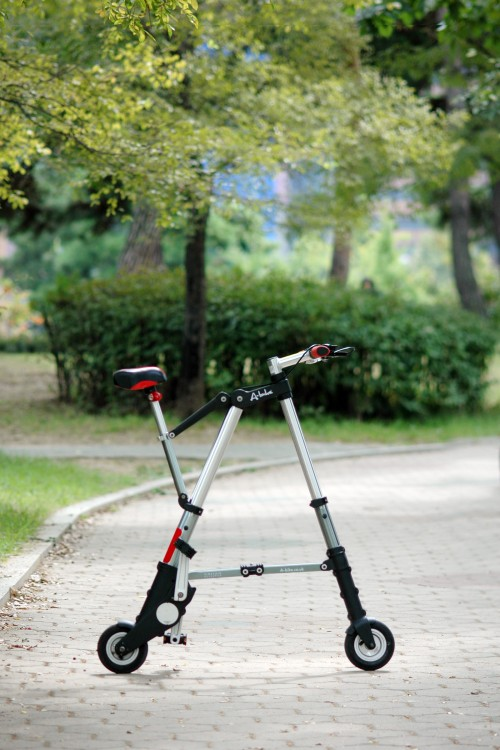
A-bike

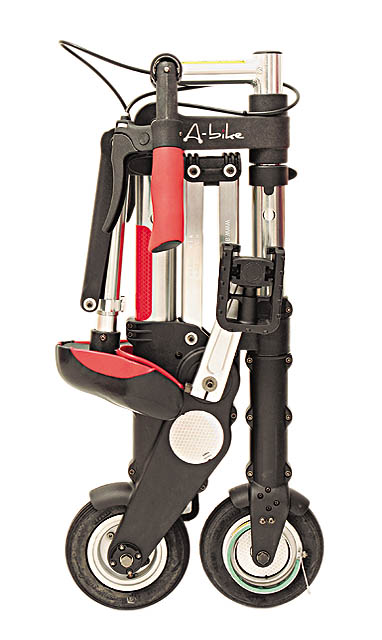
A-bike folded

The A-bike is a folding bicycle released by Sir Clive Sinclair in the United Kingdom on 12 July 2006. It was designed by Hong Kong design agency Daka, in collaboration with Sinclair Research, over a 5-year period. It was announced to the public in 2004. Clive Sinclair envisioned the A-bike, and Alex Kalogroulis was the main designer. It weighs 5.7 kg (13 lb) and folds to 67×30×16 cm (26.4×11.8×6.3 in), small enough to fit in a rucksack. The first version had 15 cm (6 in) wheels, which was increased to 20 cm (8 in) in later models. In 2015, an electric version, the A-Bike Electric, was introduced to the public as part of a Kickstarter campaign.

== A-Bike ==
=== History ===
The A-bike was designed by Sinclair Research, in collaboration with Hong Kong design agency Daka, over a 5-year period. It was announced to the public in 2004. Clive Sinclair envisioned the A-bike, and Alex Kalogroulis was the main design engineer. It was released on 12 July 2006, and was priced at £199. The official Europe distributor, Mayhem UK, hoped to sell 25,000 units in the first 12 months. By 2007 it was being noted that a "large number of counterfeit" A-bikes were appearing in China and elsewhere.

Early reviews praised the A-bike for being lightweight and easy to fold, but noted the flexing frame and uncomfortable saddle, and criticised the tiny wheels for being unsafe on uneven roads.

In 2008 the Mark-II version was released: officially known as the A-Bike Plus. This version had strengthened aluminium tubing, a new air-sprung cushioned saddle, and an upgraded drive mechanism. The Mark-III version was released in 2010, and was officially known as the A-Bike City. The main changes were larger 20 cm (8 in) wheels and it was priced at £299.99.

=== Characteristics ===
The A-bike is a small wheel bicycle with 15 cm (6 in) wheels, increasing to 20 cm (8 in) in later models. The original model weighs 5.7 kg (13 lb), and folds to 67×30×16 cm (26.4×11.8×6.3 in) reducing its volume to about 25% of its original size. A twin-chain system enables the bike to travel about 3.2 m (10.5 ft) per crank rotation despite the bicycle's small-diameter wheels (15 cm (6 in)). The crankcase housing almost completely encloses the drive mechanism, protecting it and preventing oil stains on clothing or floor surfaces.

=== Media appearances ===
In November 2006, A-bike was featured on UK television programme The Gadget Show, alongside the Strida. The distribution company behind the A-bike was featured on the UK Television programme Badger or Bust broadcast on 5 June 2007. In the Top Gear epic race Car vs. Train 2. Richard Hammond and James May carried A-bikes in their suitcases and unfolded them to bike from a ferry dock to a cable car.

== A-Bike Electric ==
In 2015, an electric version, the A-Bike Electric, was introduced to the public as part of a Kickstarter campaign. The design featured 20 cm (8 in) wheels, as well as a larger seat and sturdier frame. The funding campaign was successful and production began before the end of the year.

== See also ==
- Sinclair Zike - Sinclair's earlier attempt at a portable electric bicycle
- Brompton Bicycle - another British-designed small-wheeled bicycle
- Mini125 - a similar Italian-designed small-wheeled bicycle
