= Zike, Liberia =

Village in Nimba County, Liberia

Zike
- Location in Liberia
- Coordinates: 6°39′3″N 9°6′59″W
- Country: Liberia
- County: Nimba County

Zike is a village in Nimba County, Liberia.
