= Julia Grout =

Julia Grout (April 1, 1898 – April 23, 1984) was the Chairman of the Women's Department of Health and Physical Education at Duke University from 1924 to 1964. She was the first director of the physical education department in Duke Women's college.

== Life and career ==
Julia "Jerry" Grout was born in North Brookfield, Massachusetts, to Edgar H. Grout and Laura M. Grout. Grout earned an A.B. at Mount Holyoke College and a master's degree at Wellesley College. She became a physical education director at Duke, in 1924. She held the post until she retired in 1964. She taught for two years at Wellesley College before coming to Duke University.

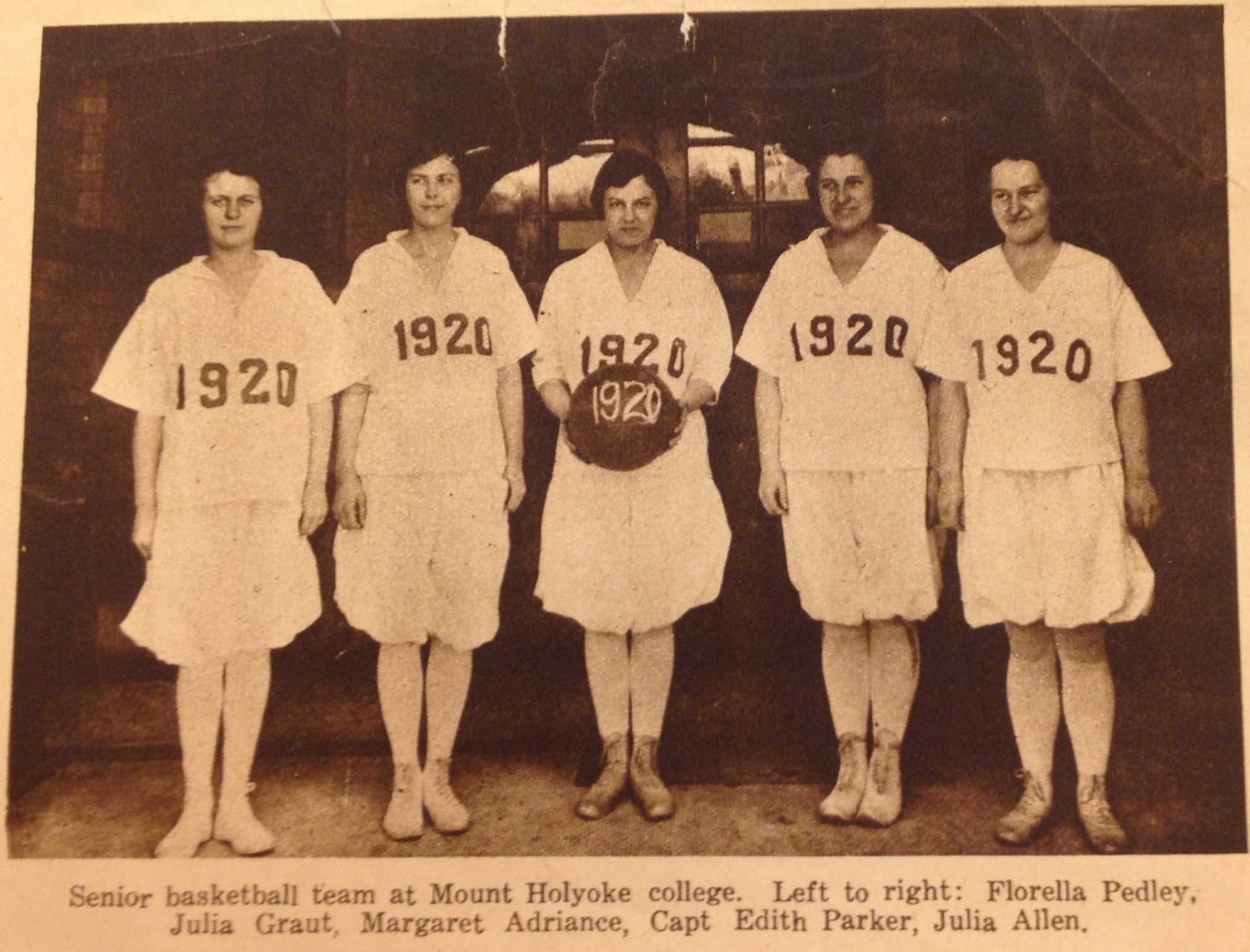
Julia Grout on 1920 Basketball Team at Mount Holyoke College

Grout contributed substantially to the promotion of physical education for women, writing and speaking extensively on the topic. Her work led her to travel extensively to report on physical education programs in Europe and Africa.

Duke University honored Grout in 1982 through the establishment of a biennial lecture in her name, being cited for her leadership in bringing national recognition to her department through the quality of its staff and programs.

Grout died in 1984, in Chapel Hill, after an extended illness, survived by her brother Edgar and her sister, Ruth Ellen Grout. Duke University's library maintains an archive related to her work and life.

== Teaching ==
In the 1930s, the Women's Physical Education Department at Duke assessed entering students in posture, health status and their development of sports skills.
