= Zike (company) =

Motorbike Manufacturer

Zike was a company that produced a line of scooter hybrids. The company was based in Greenville, SC, and was founded by inventor and former CEO Nathan Scolari. There were four initial models (Flyby, Hotshot, Slingshot, and Saber) available. Fox Business News called Zike one of "10 Tech-Free Toys Your Kids Will Love", and Zike has been featured on The View.
