= Ruth Ellen Grout =

American health educator

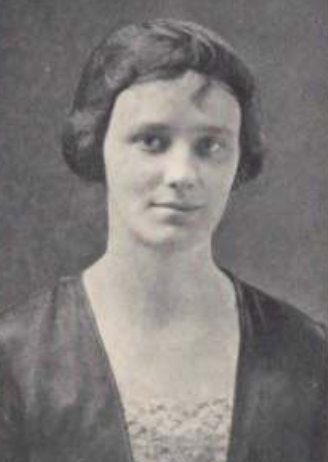
- Ruth Ellen Grout, from the 1923 yearbook of Mount Holyoke College
- Born: October 4, 1901; Princeton, Massachusetts, U.S.
- Died: February 22, 1998 (aged 96); Chapel Hill, North Carolina, U.S.
- Occupation(s): Health educator, college professor
- Relatives: Julia Grout (sister)

Ruth Ellen Grout (October 4, 1901 – February 22, 1998) was an American health educator. She taught at the University of Minnesota School of Public Health from 1943 until her retirement in 1967. She was also a consultant to the World Health Organization from 1952 to 1971.

== Early life and education ==
Grout was born in Princeton, Massachusetts, the daughter of Edgar H. Grout and Laura M. Miller Grout. Her father was the superintendent of schools in East Bridgewater, Massachusetts from 1903 to 1928. Her older sister Julia Grout was a physical educator and professor at Duke University.

Grout graduated from Mount Holyoke College in 1923. She earned a master's degree in 1930, and a Ph.D. in 1939, from Yale University. She received a fellowship from the American Association of University Women (AAUW) for her graduate studies.

== Career ==
Grout directed a health education study for the Milbank Memorial Fund in Cattaraugus County, New York, from 1931 to 1938. She was Senior Supervisor of Health Education for the Tennessee Valley Authority from 1939 to 1942. She was a professor at the University of Minnesota School of Public Health from 1943 until her retirement in 1967. She was also a consultant to the World Health Organization from 1952 to 1971. She spoke at community meetings and academic conferences about her work.

Grout was technical advisor on a short educational film, Human Reproduction (1947). In 1950, she was a founding board member of the Society of Public Health Educators (SOPHE). After she retired to North Carolina, she was a founding member of the board at her retirement community, Carol Woods, and helped establish the Home Health Agency of Chapel Hill.

== Publications ==
- "A Project in Rural School Health Education: Initiating the Study" (1933)
- Handbook of Health Education: A Guide for Teachers in Rural Schools (1936)
- "Function of the School in the Rural Health Program" (1937)
- "Rural Supervision of Health Education" (1937)
- "Health Materials for Rural Schools" (1938, with Vivian V. Drenckhahn)
- "Appraising a School Health Education Program" (1940)
- "Preparation of Health Education Personnel for the War and Post-war Periods: Preparation of the Public School Teacher"(1944)
- "Postwar Problems in Teacher Education in the Field of Health Education" (1947)
- "Health Education Today in the Light of Yesterday" (1947)
- "Health Education in Industry: The Nurse's Part" (1947)
- Health Teaching in Schools (1949)
- "Public Health Education Section: Research and Evaluation Projects in the Field of Health Education" (1951, with Andie L. Knutson and W. Fulton)
- "Planning a Conference: A Chronological Story of the Development of the European Conference on Health Education of the Public" (1954)
- "Health Education in Public Health Practice" (1967)
- "The Nurse and Health Education" (1971, with Julia D. Watkins)

== Personal life and legacy ==
Grout died in 1998, at the age of 96, in Chapel Hill, North Carolina. The University of Minnesota established a scholarship named for Grout in 1996. There is a box of her papers in the University of Minnesota Archives.
