= Daniel A. Grout =

Daniel Alexander Grout (January 5, 1862 – February 27, 1929), was a school teacher and principal and school board administrator.

== Career ==
Daniel Grout was born at St. Thomas, Canada West, and graduated from St. Thomas Normal School in 1884. After three terms as a teacher he was made principal of schools in Sparta, Ontario and Aldboro, Ontario. He traveled to Oregon in 1890 and graduated from the University of Oregon's law school.

Grout first served in Portland, Oregon as the principal of North Central School from 1892 to 1895. He was the principal of the Atkinson School until 1896 and was then made principal of the Park School. He continued working at Park until 1907, and then was made principal of East Side High School. Shortly after this, the position of assistant superintendent was created over the Portland Public Schools. He became superintendent in 1918 and held that office until he retired on January 1, 1926 due to poor health. He died in February 1929.

Soon after his retirement, the school board named a new elementary school in his honor, which still exists today at 3119 SE Holgate Boulevard in Portland.
