= William L. Grout =

American businessman (1833–1908)

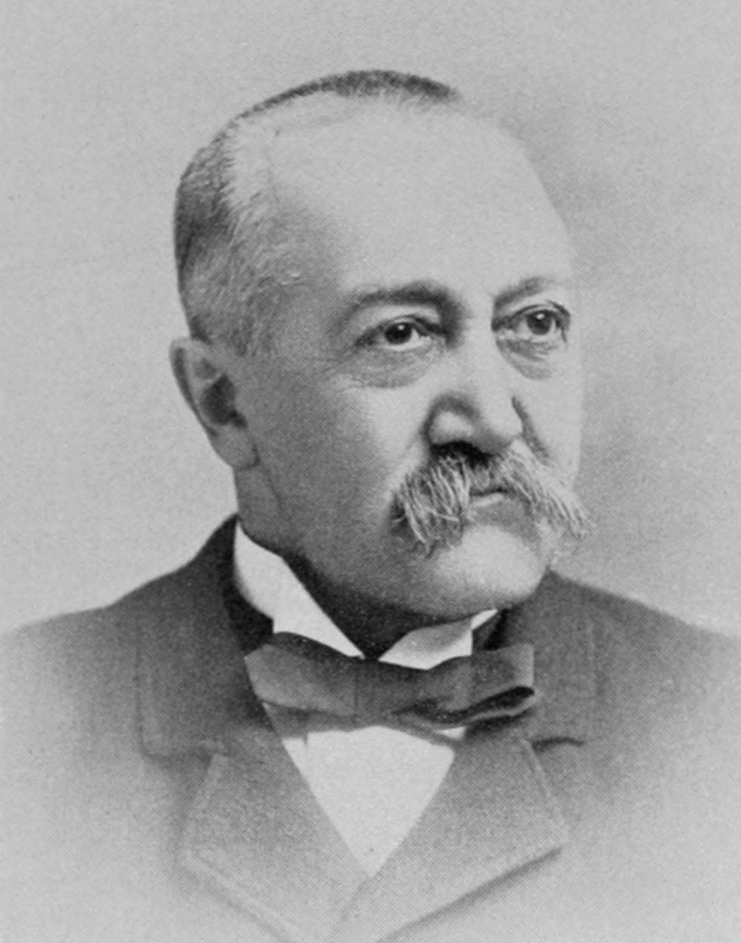
- Born: May 21, 1833; Winchendon, Massachusetts
- Died: April 15, 1908 (aged 74); Greenfield, Massachusetts
- Burial place: Forest Hills Cemetery
- Occupation: Manufacturer
- Spouse: Ellen Hemenway (m. 1856)
- Children: 7

William L. Grout (1833–1908) was an American industrialist and pioneer manufacturer of sewing machines and automobiles.

== Biography ==
William L. Grout was born in Winchendon, Massachusetts on May 21, 1833, the son of farmer Lewis Grout. He married Ellen Hemenway in 1856, and they had seven children.

In 1876 he started, together with Thomas H. White, the White Sewing Machine Company in Cleveland, Ohio. The company was founded with a joint capital of $400 which he brought in. Later, White began building steam and gasoline automobiles and became a leading truck manufacturer for decades.

Later, they separated, and Grout founded the New Home Sewing Machine Company in Orange, Massachusetts. Business flourished, and in 1892, its best year, New Home sold 1.2 million sewing machines.

His sons Carl, Fred, and C.B. were not interested in his business. So, he set them up in the automobile business in 1900 as manufacturers of both steam- and gasoline-powered cars.

At first, they were sold under the "Grout New Home" label. Although quite successful with up to 18 steam vehicles built per week by 1904, William L. Grout disagreed more and more with the way his sons handled business. Severe family struggle arose as he ended serving a $200,000 attachment on the factory - and faced, aged 74, a lawsuit to install a conservator for him because of his age. Finally, he succeeded and took control of the company. His sons resigned and left town.

William L. Grout died at his home in Greenfield, Massachusetts on April 15, 1908, and was buried at Forest Hills Cemetery in Boston. This left the company in trouble again. Production closed in 1912, after a reorganization.

== See also ==
- Grout (automobile)
- White Motor Company
