= Sinclair Zike =

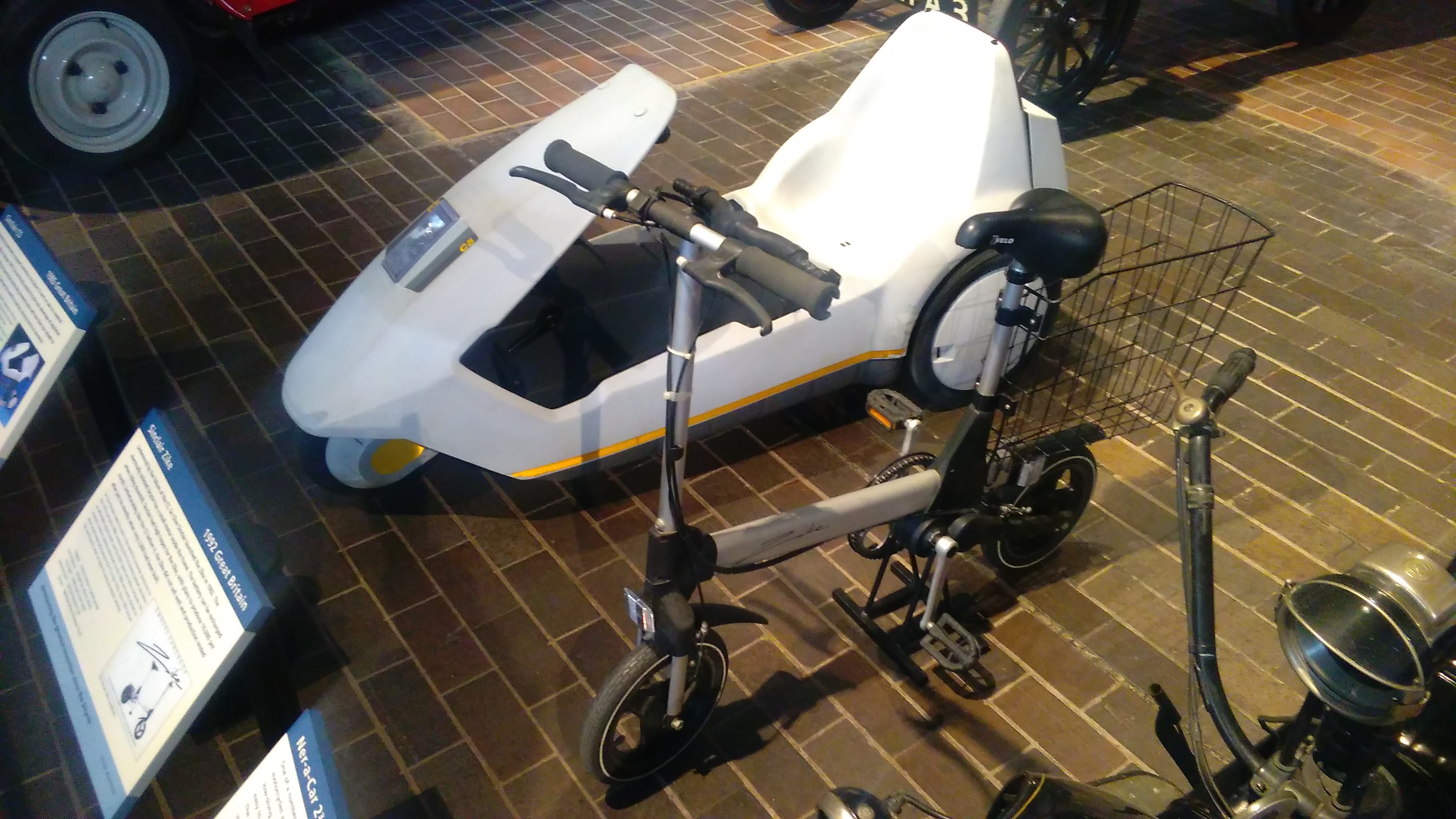
- A Sinclair Zike on display with a Sinclair C5 at the National Motor Museum, Beaulieu

Overview
- Manufacturer: Sinclair Research
- Production: 1992
- Assembly: Birmingham, UK (Tudor Webasto Ltd)

Body and chassis
- Class: Battery electric vehicle
- Layout: Bicycle

Powertrain
- Electric motor: 100 W (0.13 hp)
- Battery: 24 V nickel–cadmium battery

Dimensions
- Wheelbase: 85 cm (33.5 in)
- Length: 115 cm (45.3 in)
- Height: 100 cm (39.4 in)
- Kerb weight: 11 kg (24 lb)

The Zike, or Sinclair Zike, is a lightweight electric bicycle invented by Clive Sinclair and marketed by his company Sinclair Research Ltd in 1992. It was a commercial failure, selling only 2,000 units while originally intended to be produced at the rate of 10,000 a month. It was ended six months after introduction.

== Design ==
The Sinclair Zike is a portable bicycle with a small electric motor driving the rear wheel and with batteries built into its frame. It weighs 11 kg (24 lb). The batteries fit inside the central shaft together with the motor. The two-wheeler utilizes nickel–cadmium batteries, which weigh half as much as the typical lead–acid batteries used in 20th-century electric vehicles and can withstand 2000 recharging cycles. A three-position throttle placed under the right handlebar varies the electric power and thus the amount of pedaling required to keep going, although the Zike has only one gear. Battery life is said to be between 30 minutes and three hours depending on which of the three running speeds are used. The batteries can be fully recharged by plugging them into the mains for just one hour, and they are also recharged regeneratively using the energy from pedalling, freewheeling, and braking. The bicycle's maximum self-powered speed was limited to 15 miles per hour (mph) to avoid classification as a motorcycle under UK law.

== History ==
The Sinclair Zike was developed by Sir Clive Sinclair following the commercial failure of the Sinclair C5 in 1985. Electric vehicles were one of his long-term research ambitions. The Zike was financed largely with his own money, and the manufacture was subcontracted to Tudor Webasto, a Birmingham-based company.

The Zike was launched on 5 March 1992 at the Cyclex exhibition in Olympia, London, when a prototype was demonstrated to both press and public. The price (mail order) was £499, comparable with a top of the range tourer or mountain bike at that time. The initial production target was 10,000 Zikes a month. In May 1993 press reports stated that Tudor Webasto had terminated production because of low sales and that Sinclair was seeking a new manufacturer. In the end only around 2,000 units were sold.

Sinclair himself moved on to the development of the Sinclair ZETA (Zero Emission Transport Accessory)—a detachable powerpack intended to sit on the wheel of any bicycle to help power it along.

Sinclair put the failure of the Zike down to the business structure of the company manufacturing the bicycle. “We brought out the Zike and that had reasonable success but it hit a snag because the company that was making it for us, on a sub-contract basis, turned out to be a subsidiary of a German company and the German owners came in and closed the whole thing down. Very, very sad.”

== Reviews ==
The reviews for the Zike in the British press were somewhat negative (possibly in part due to memories of the C5 which preceded it). Susan Watts for The Independent called it "an impressive feat of miniaturisation" but stated that "a quick test ride suggested the Zike is too unstable and lacking in power to make a cyclist feel secure on the nightmarish roads of London." Similarly Nik Berg for Auto Express noted that the Zike was lightweight and portable, but expressed concern about the lack of power and stated that "potholes should be avoided at all costs—the tiny wheels just get swallowed."

== See also ==
- A-bike - Sinclair's later development of folding bicycle technology
