= Grout (automobile) =

Defunct American motor vehicle manufacturer

Grout Brothers
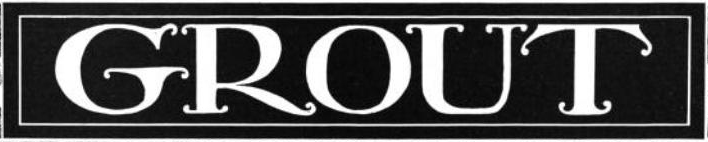
- Type: Automobile Manufacturing
- Industry: Automotive
- Genre: Touring cars
- Founded: 1899
- Founder: Brothers, Carl, Fred and C.B. Grout
- Defunct: 1912
- Headquarters: Orange, Massachusetts, United States
- Area served: United States
- Products: Vehicles; Automotive parts

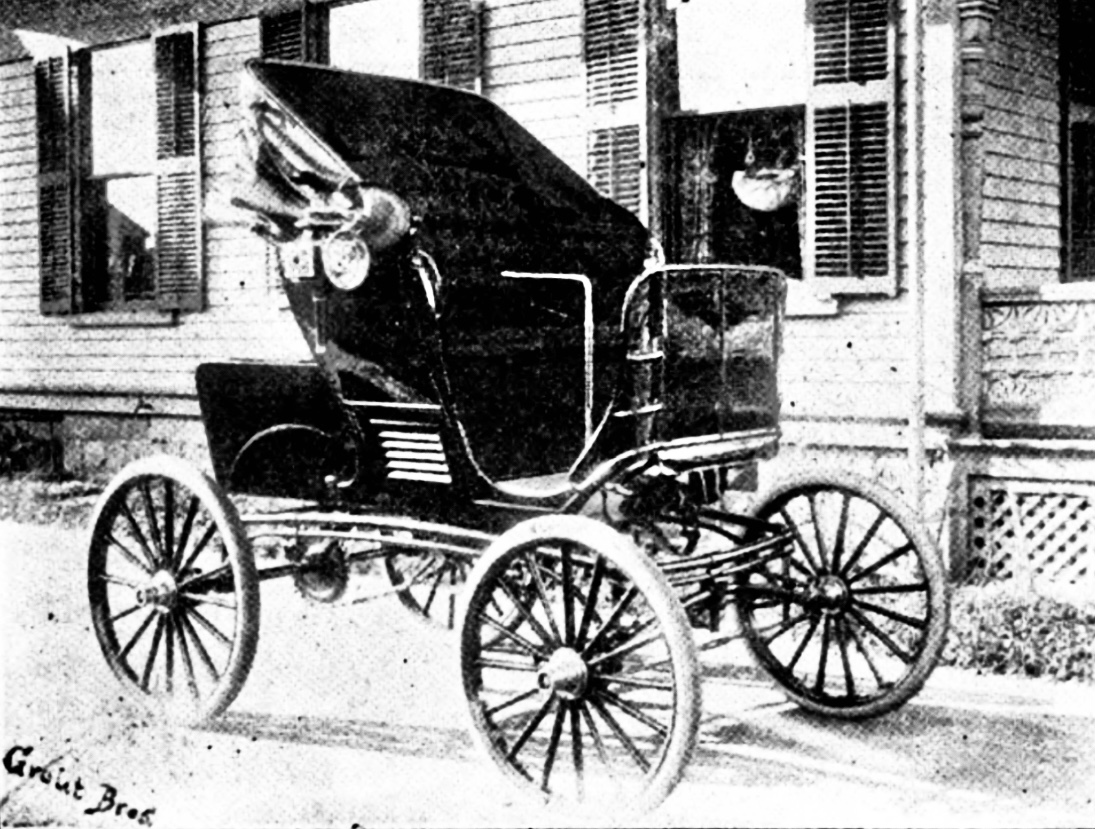
Grout Steam New Home Stanhope (1900).

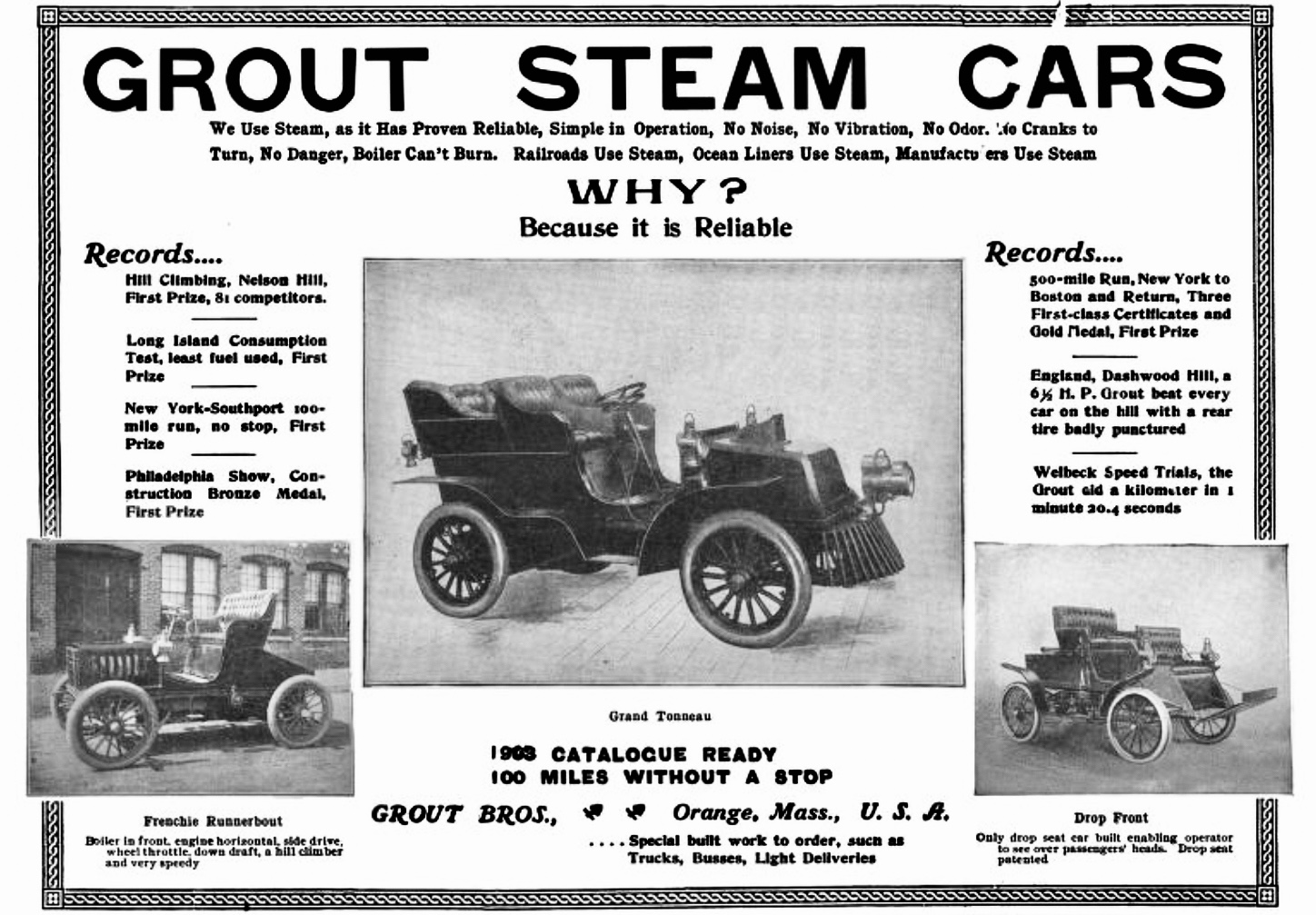
Grout Brothers advertisement (1903)

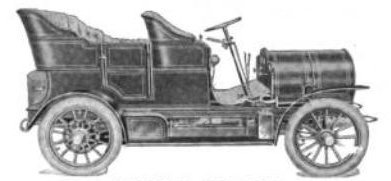
1905 Grout

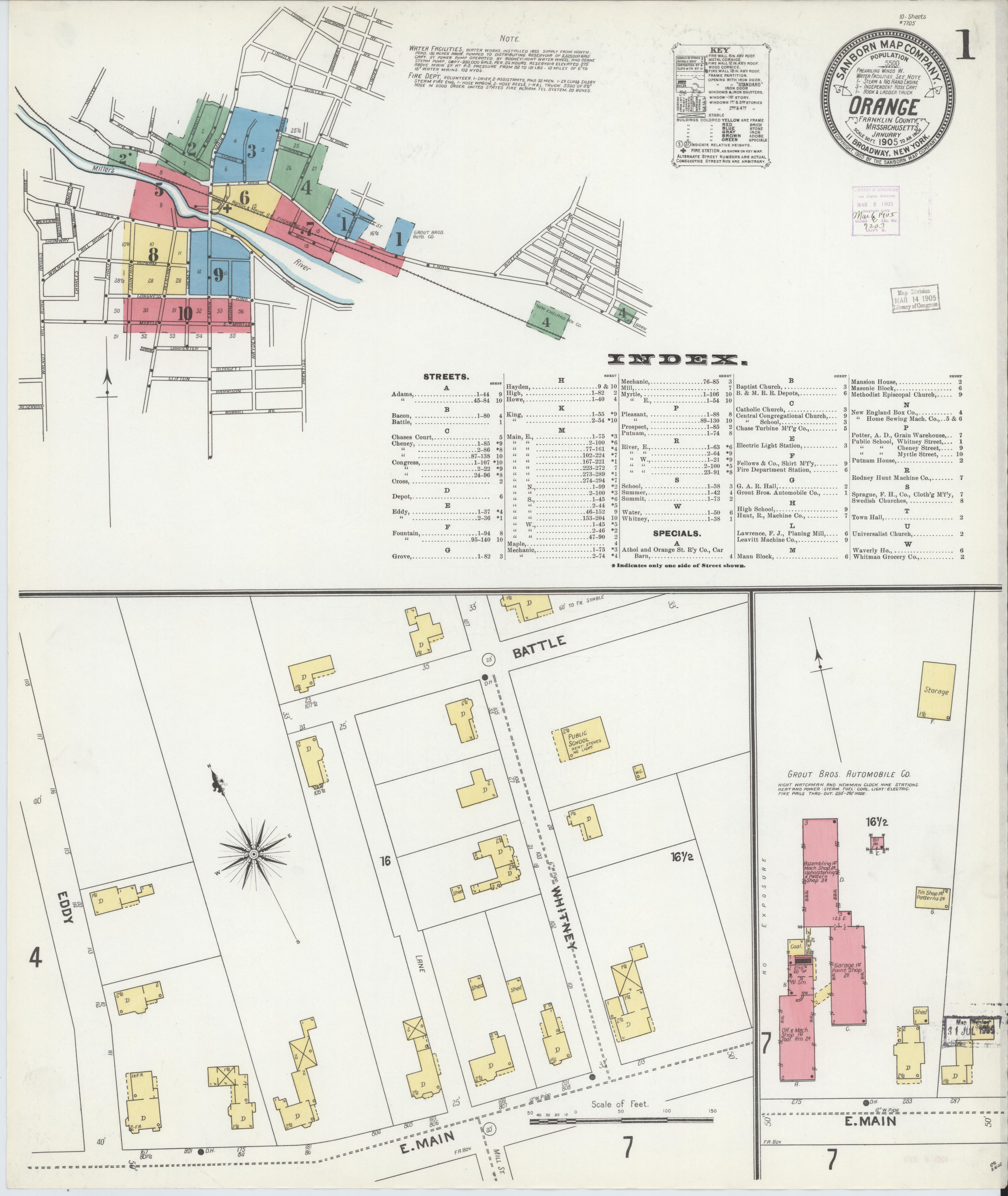
1905 Grout plant

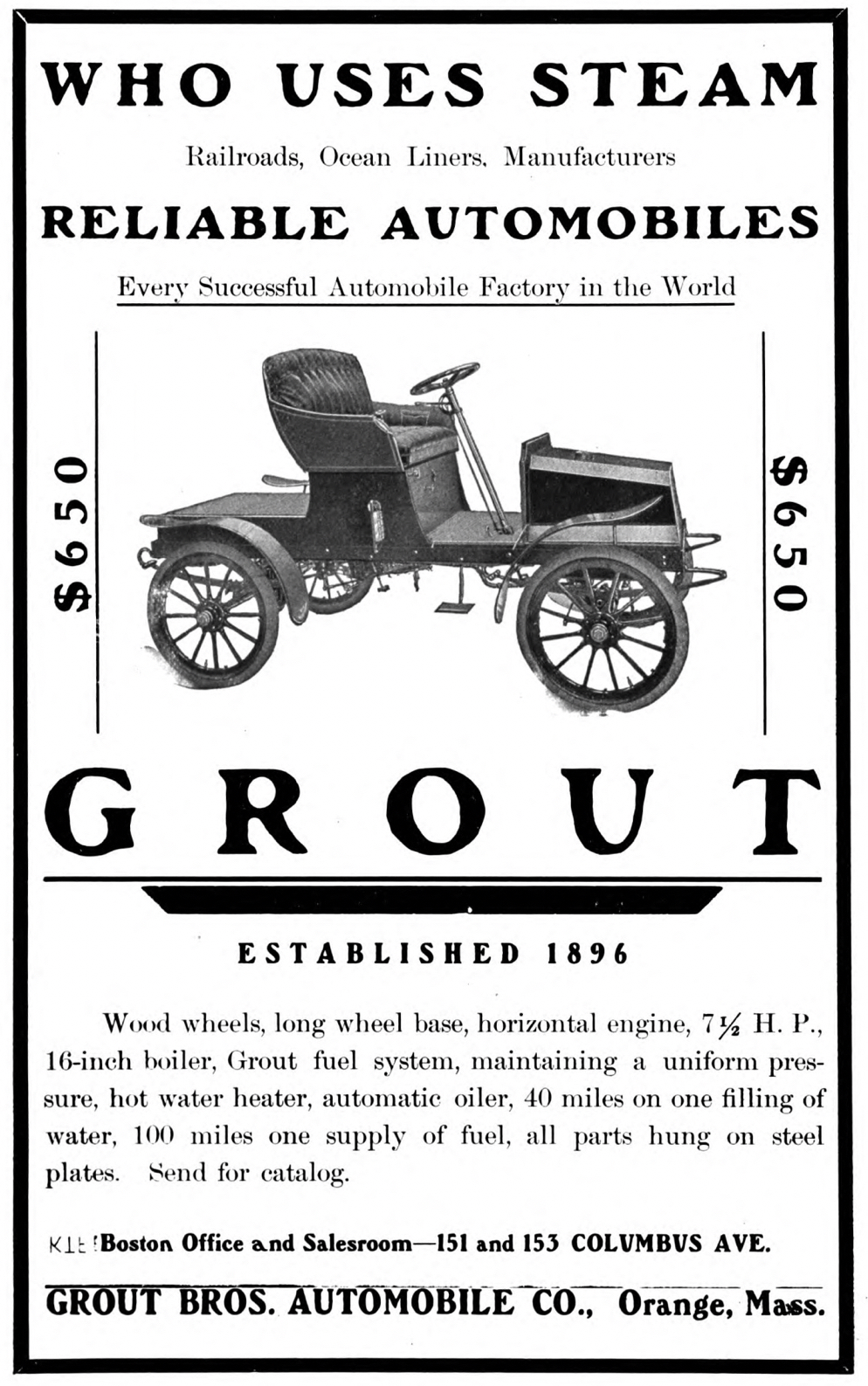
Grout 7,5 HP Steamer (1900-1905)

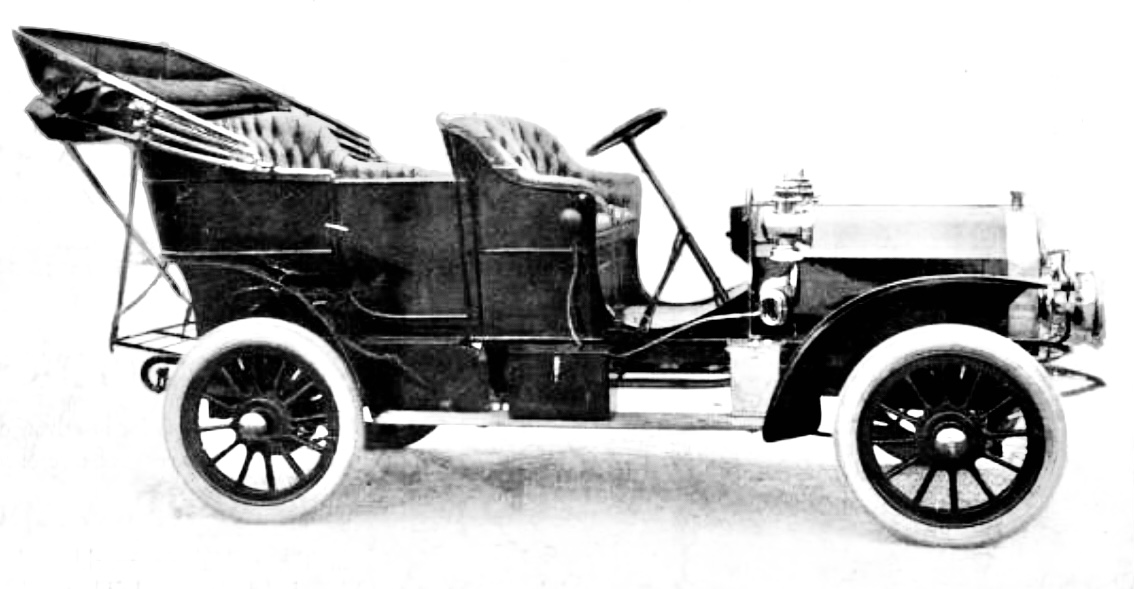
Grout 30-35 hp (1906)

Grout Brothers was a manufacturer of steam-powered automobiles in Orange, Massachusetts. The three brothers, Carl, Fred and C.B. were set up in business by their father William L., who had made sewing machines under the New Home name in partnership with Thomas H. White. The early cars were sold under the New Home name.

The Grout name debuted on autos in 1899.

== History ==
In 1900, Grout offered a four-seat steam trap powered by a two-cylinder engine mounted under the seat. An enclosed body model followed in 1901. An unusual model was the 1903 Steam Tonneau, which was fitted with a cowcatcher at the front.

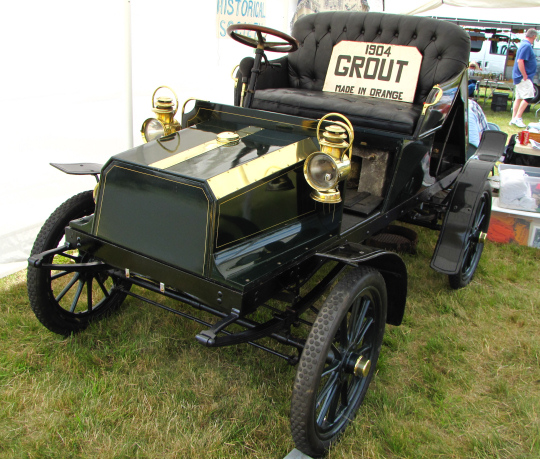
1904 Grout steam powered automobile

The 1904 Grout Touring Car was a touring car model. It could seat five passengers and sold for US$2000. The two-cylinder steam engine was mounted horizontally at the center of the car, with the boiler at the front under the typical touring car hood. This engine produced 12 hp (8.9 kW). The car weighed 2200 lb (998 kg).

In 1904, Grout introduced a range of conventional four-cylinder gasoline-engined cars, but by then the company had financial problems, and few were made. The last cars were made in 1912.

The steamers were exported to the United Kingdom and sold under the Weston name.

The Grout assembly plant in Orange, Massachusetts, was still standing in 2018 and was also home to Minute Tapioca Company and since 1977, has been the corporate offices of Pete's Tire Barns, Inc. The initial structure is still intact with additions on the sides of the back of the building. Over the years, Pete's Tire Barns has uncovered artifacts from the manufacturing facility including wheels, tires, etc.

The Orange Historical Society Museum currently houses two Grout Automobiles.

== Sources ==
- Frank Leslie's Popular Monthly (January, 1904)
- Clymer, Floyd. Treasury of Early American Automobiles, 1877–1925 (New York: Bonanza Books, 1950), p. 14.
