= W. H. J. Grout =

Bicycle inventor and manufacturer

William Henry James Grout (1839–1915) was a pioneering inventor and manufacturer of bicycles.

Grout grew up in Hackney and established the Tension Bicycle company in Stoke Newington. He patented the Grout Tension Bicycle in 1870 which introduced several innovations including hollow forks to save weight, rubber tyres for a better ride and adjustable spokes which could be tensioned to align the wheel. He also devised a portable version of an Ordinary bicycle penny-farthing, whose front wheel could be dismantled into four sections for carrying.
