= QUED =

QUED may refer to:

- QUED/M, text editor
- QueD (gene) or 6-carboxytetrahydropterin synthase, an enzyme
- Qued Charter Elementary School, now the Barack Obama Charter School

== People with the name ==
- Qued Koi, Kiowa painter, dancer and flute player
- Betty Keener Archuleta, Cherokee-American painter also known as Qued

== See also ==
- Que (disambiguation)
- Qued-Zen, a concentration and internment camp connected to the Laconia incident
- Queue (disambiguation)
- Quid (disambiguation)
