= Cue (surname) =

Cue or Cué is a surname. Notable people with the surname include:

== Name ==
=== Cue ===
- Eddy Cue (born 1964), senior vice president at Apple, Inc.
- Eye Cue, Macedonian pop/rock dúo
- Ko-Jo Cue (born 1989), Ghanaian rapper
- Tom Cue (c. 1850 – 1920), gold prospector in Western Australia

=== Cué ===
- Ana María Cué (born 1941), Argentine pianist, poet, and educator
- Elena Cué (born 1972), Spanish businesswoman, art expert and writer
- Gabino Cué Monteagudo (born 1966), Mexican politician, governor of Oaxaca in 2010–2016
- Nico Cué (born 1956), Spanish union representative and politician
- Raúl Bolaños Cacho Cué (born 1988), Mexican politician affiliated with the Ecologist Green Party of Mexico

== Middle name ==
- Kelly Cue Davis, American academic, Arizona State University

== Variants ==
- McCue

== See also ==
- Cue (disambiguation)
- Kue
