= Rape =

Type of sexual assault involving sexual intercourse without consent

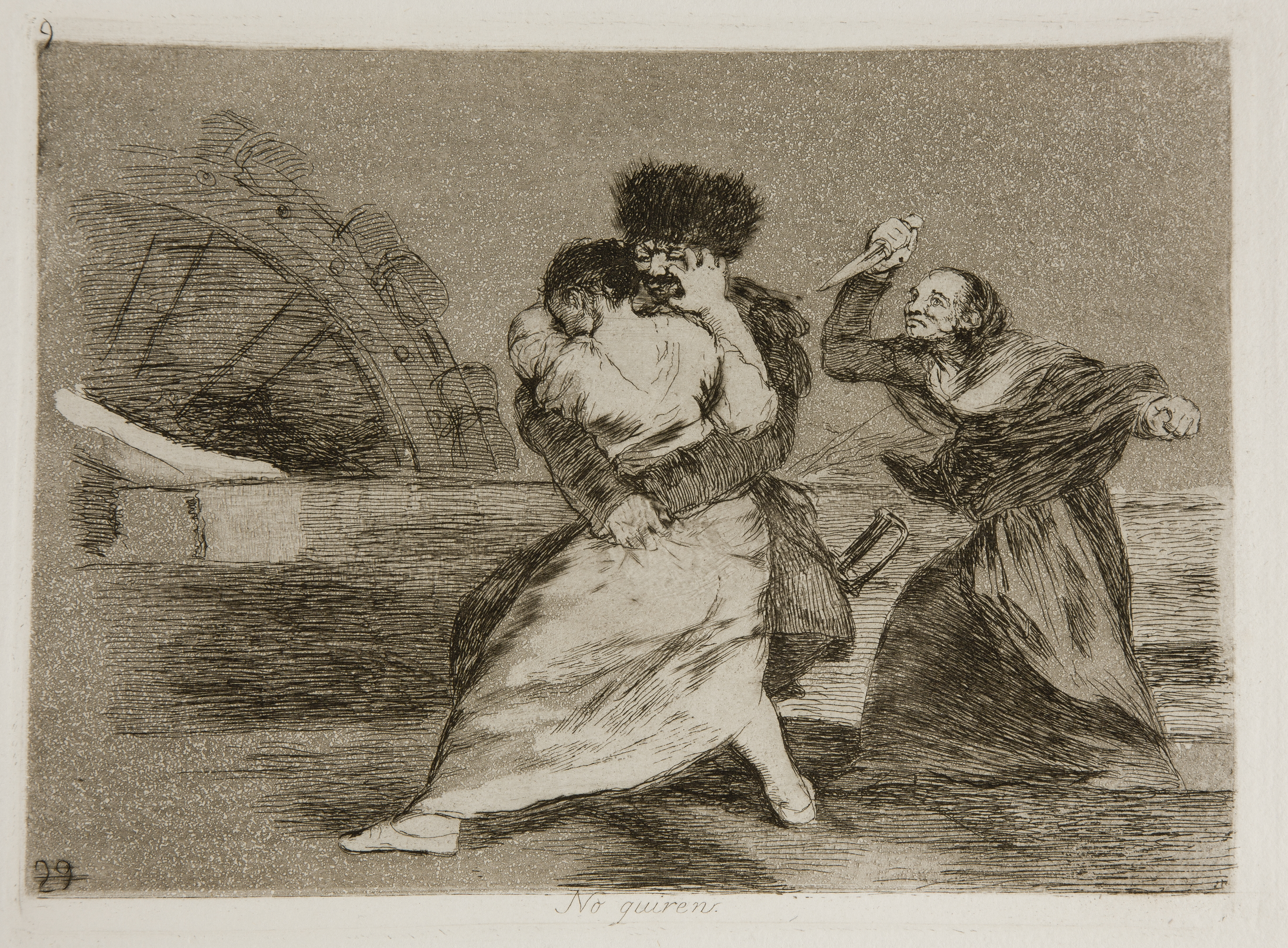
They do not want to (plate 9 of The Disasters of War) by Francisco Goya, 1863

Rape is a type of sexual assault involving sexual intercourse, or other forms of sexual penetration, carried out against a person without their consent. The act may be carried out through physical force, coercion, or through sex with a person who is incapable of giving valid consent, such as one who is incapacitated, has an intellectual disability, or is below the legal age of consent (statutory rape). The term rape is sometimes used interchangeably with the term sexual assault, though the latter can sometimes refer to acts which are not themselves rape.

Victims are often traumatized and may develop post-traumatic stress disorder. Less commonly, rape can also result in serious injuries, and also carries the risk of sexually transmitted infections. Assigned female at birth victims face the additional risk of pregnancy. A victim may face violence or threats to stay silent from the rapist and, sometimes, from the victim's own family for cultural reasons—such as in honor killings.

Rape is a serious crime in most jurisdictions, although most jurisdictions do not criminalize rape of men. The rates of reporting, prosecution and conviction for rape vary between jurisdictions. Internationally, the incidence of rapes recorded by the police during 2008 ranged, per 100,000 people, from 0.2 in Azerbaijan to 92.9 in Botswana with 6.3 in Lithuania as the median. Rape by strangers is usually less common than rape by people the victim knows. Worldwide, reported instances of sexual violence (including rape) are primarily committed by males against females, though both males and females may be victims or perpetrators. Male victims are less likely to report instances of rape due to stigma and other factors, and male-on-male prison rapes are common and may be the least reported form of rape.

Widespread and systematic rape (e.g., war rape) and sexual slavery can occur during international conflict. These practices are crimes against humanity and war crimes. Rape is also recognized as an element of the crime of genocide when committed with the intent to destroy, in whole or in part, a targeted ethnic group.

== Etymology ==
The term rape originates from the Latin rapere (supine stem raptum), "to snatch, to grab, to carry off". In Roman law, the carrying off of a woman by force, with or without intercourse, constituted "raptus". In Medieval English law the same term could refer to either kidnapping or rape in the modern sense of "sexual violation". The original meaning of "carry off by force" is still found in some phrases, such as "rape and pillage", or in titles, such as the stories of the Rape of the Sabine Women and The Rape of Europa or the poem The Rape of the Lock, which is about the theft of a lock of hair.

== Definitions ==
=== General ===
Rape is defined in most jurisdictions as sexual intercourse, or other forms of sexual penetration, committed by a perpetrator against a victim without their consent. The definition of rape is inconsistent between governmental health organizations, law enforcement, health providers, and legal professions. It has varied historically and culturally. Originally, rape had no sexual connotation and is still used in other contexts in English. In Roman law, it or raptus was classified as a form of crimen vis, "crime of assault". Raptus referred to the abduction of a woman against the will of the man under whose authority she lived, and sexual intercourse was not a necessary element. Other definitions of rape have changed over time. The International Criminal Tribunal for the former Yugoslavia considered rape as a crime that required coercion or force or threat of force against the victim or a third person.

Until 2012, the Federal Bureau of Investigation (FBI) considered rape a crime solely committed by men against women. In 2012, they changed their definition from "The carnal knowledge of a female forcibly and against her will" to "The penetration, no matter how slight, of the vagina or anus with any body part or object, or oral penetration by a sex organ of another person, without the consent of the victim." The updated definition still excluded a man being forced to penetrate a woman from the definition of rape, which is generally recognized as the academic definition of rape. However, it recognized any gender of victim and perpetrator and that rape with an object can be as traumatic as penile or vaginal rape. The bureau further describes instances when the victim is unable to give consent because of mental or physical incapacity. It recognizes that a victim can be incapacitated by drugs and alcohol and unable to give valid consent. The definition does not change federal or state criminal codes or impact charging and prosecution on the federal, state, or local level; it rather means that rape will be more accurately reported nationwide.

Health organizations and agencies have also expanded rape beyond traditional definitions. The World Health Organization (WHO) defines rape as a form of sexual assault, while the Centers for Disease Control and Prevention (CDC) includes rape in their definition of sexual assault; they term rape a form of sexual violence. The CDC lists other acts of coercive, non-consensual sexual activity that may or may not include rape, including drug-facilitated sexual assault, acts in which a victim is made to penetrate a perpetrator or someone else, intoxication where the victim is unable to consent (due to incapacitation or being unconscious), non-physically forced penetration which occurs after a person is pressured verbally (by intimidation or misuse of authority to force to consent), or completed or attempted forced penetration of a victim via unwanted physical force (including using a weapon or threatening to use a weapon). The Veterans Health Administration (VHA) has implemented universal screening for what has been termed "military sexual trauma" (MST) and provides medical and mental health services free of charge to enrolled veterans who report MST (Title 38 United States Code 1720D; Public Law 108–422).

Some countries or jurisdictions differentiate between rape and sexual assault by defining rape as involving penile penetration of the vagina, or solely penetration involving the penis, while other types of non-consensual sexual activity are called sexual assault. Scotland, for example, emphasizes penile penetration, requiring that the sexual assault must have been committed by use of a penis to qualify as rape. The 1998 International Criminal Tribunal for Rwanda defines rape as "a physical invasion of a sexual nature committed on a person under circumstances which are coercive". In other cases, the term rape has been phased out of legal use in favor of terms such as sexual assault or criminal sexual conduct.

Some countries criminalize non-consensual condom removal ("stealthing"), where one partner removes (or intentionally damages) their condom during sex without telling the other partner; the rationale is that consent was given to protected sex and not to unprotected sex, making the subsequent act non-consensual and therefore illicit; for such cases, United Kingdom, Switzerland, New Zealand have enacted rape convictions, while Australia, Canada, Germany saw convictions for sexual assault; California considers it sexual battery.

=== Scope ===
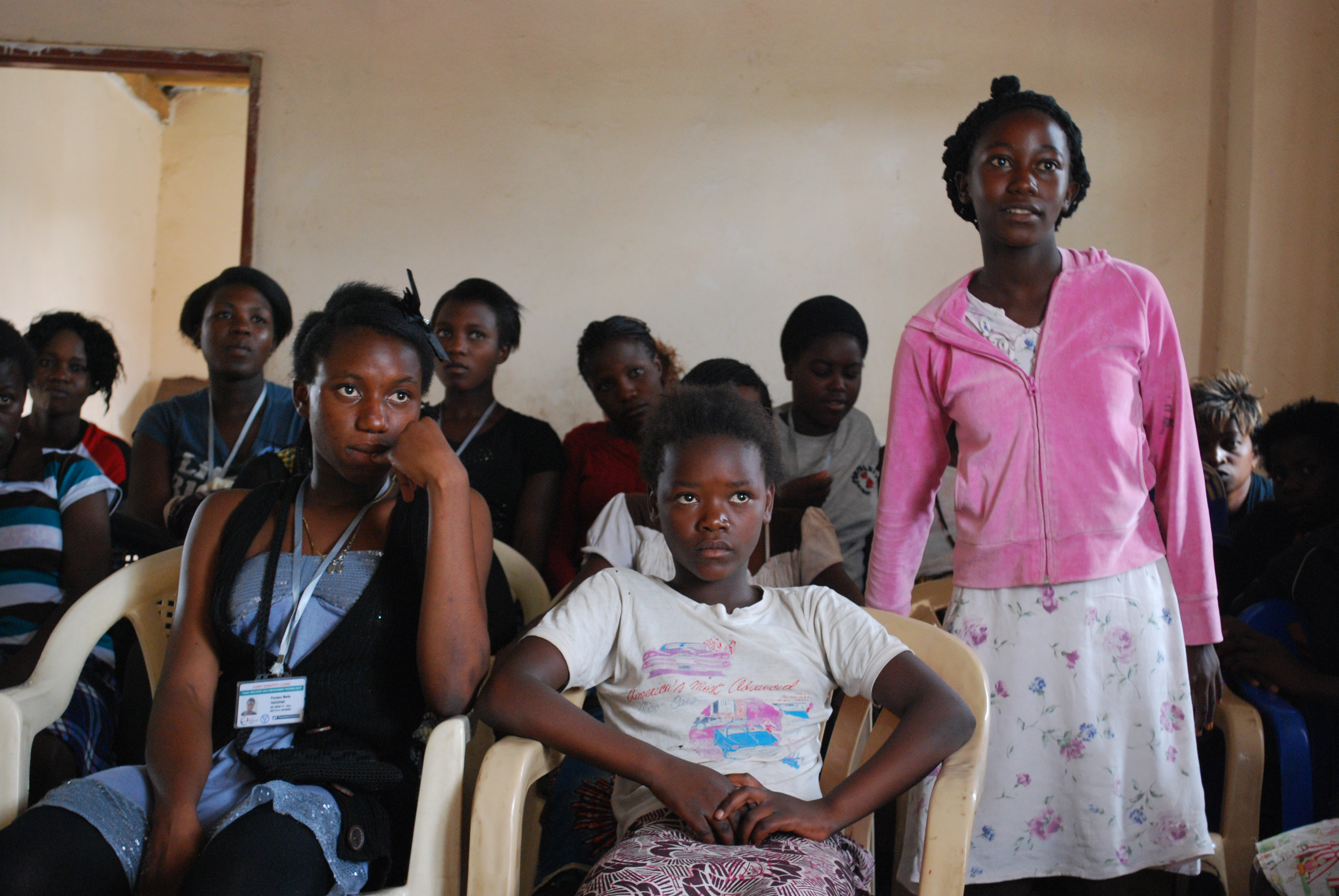
In Zambia, 43% of girls and women between the ages of 15 and 49 have experienced some form of sexual violence.

Victims of rape or sexual assault come from a wide range of genders, ages, sexual orientations, ethnicities, geographical locations, cultures, and degrees of impairment or disability. Incidences of rape are classified into a number of categories, and they may describe the relationship of the perpetrator to the victim and the context of the sexual assault. These include date rape, gang rape, marital rape, incestual rape, child sexual abuse, prison rape, acquaintance rape, war rape and statutory rape. Forced sexual activity can be committed over a long period of time with little to no physical injury.

=== Consent ===
Lack of consent is key to the definition of rape. Consent is affirmative "informed approval, indicating a freely given agreement" to sexual activity. It is not necessarily expressed verbally, and may instead be overtly implied from actions, but the absence of objection does not constitute consent. Lack of consent may result from either forcible compulsion by the perpetrator or an inability to consent on the part of the victim (such as people who are asleep, intoxicated or otherwise mentally compromised). Sexual intercourse with a person below the age of consent, i.e., the age at which legal competence is established, is referred to as statutory rape. In India, consensual sex given on the false promise of marriage constitutes rape.

Duress is the situation when the person is threatened by force or violence and may result in the absence of an objection to sexual activity. This can lead to the presumption of consent. Duress may be actual or threatened force or violence against the victim or someone close to the victim. Even blackmail may constitute duress. Abuse of power may constitute duress. For instance, in the Philippines, a man commits rape if he engages in sexual intercourse with a woman "[by] means of fraudulent machination or grave abuse of authority". The International Criminal Tribunal for Rwanda in its landmark 1998 judgment used a definition of rape that did not use the word 'consent': "a physical invasion of a sexual nature committed on a person under circumstances which are coercive."

Marital rape, or spousal rape, is non-consensual sex in which the perpetrator is the victim's spouse. It is a form of partner rape, domestic violence, and sexual abuse. Once widely accepted or ignored by law, marital rape is now denounced by international conventions and is increasingly criminalized. Still, in many countries, marital rape either remains legal or is illegal but widely tolerated and accepted as a husband's prerogative. In 2006, the UN Secretary-General's In-depth study on all forms of violence against women stated that (pg 113): "Marital rape may be prosecuted in at least 104 states. Of these, 32 have made marital rape a specific criminal offense, while the remaining 74 do not exempt marital rape from general rape provisions. Marital rape is not a prosecutable offense in at least 53 States. Four States criminalize marital rape only when the spouses are judicially separated. Four States are considering legislation that would allow marital rape to be prosecuted." Since 2006, several other states have outlawed marital rape (for example Thailand in 2007).

In the US, the criminalization of marital rape started in the mid-1970s, and in 1993 North Carolina became the last state to make marital rape illegal. In many countries, it is not clear if marital rape may or may not be prosecuted under ordinary rape laws. In the absence of a marital rape law, it may be possible to bring prosecution for acts of forced sexual intercourse inside marriage by prosecuting, through the use of other criminal offenses (such as assault based offenses), the acts of violence or criminal threat that were used to obtain submission.

Consent may be complicated by law, language, context, culture and sexual orientation. Studies have shown that men consistently perceive women's actions as more sexual than they intend. In addition, verbalized "no" to sex may be interpreted as "keep trying", or even "yes" by offenders. Some may believe that when injuries are not visible, the woman must have consented. If a man solicits sex from another man, the pursuer may be regarded as virile.

== Motives ==
The WHO states that the principal factors that lead to the perpetration of sexual violence against women, including rape, are:

- Beliefs in family honor and sexual purity;
- Attitudes of male sexual entitlement;
- Weak legal sanctions for sexual violence.

No single facet explains the motivation for rape; the underlying motives of rapists can be multi-faceted. Several factors have been proposed: anger, power, sadism, sexual gratification, or evolutionary proclivities. However, some factors have significant causal evidence supporting them. American clinical psychologist David Lisak, co-author of a 2002 study of undetected rapists, says that compared with non-rapists, both undetected and convicted rapists are measurably more angry at women and more motivated by a desire to dominate and control them, are more impulsive, disinhibited, anti-social, hypermasculine, and less empathic.

Sexual aggression is often considered a masculine identity characteristic of manhood in some male groups and is significantly correlated to the desire to be held higher in esteem among male peers. Sexually aggressive behavior among young men has been correlated with gang or group membership as well as having other delinquent peers.

Gang rape is often perceived by male perpetrators as a justified method of discouraging or punishing what they consider as immoral behavior among women – for example, wearing short skirts or visiting bars. In some areas in Papua New Guinea, women can be punished by public gang rape, usually through permission by elders.

Gang rape and mass rape are often used as a means of male bonding. This is particularly evident among soldiers, as gang rape accounts for about three quarters or more of war rape, while gang rape accounts for less than a quarter of rapes during peacetime. Commanders sometimes push recruits to rape, as committing rape can be taboo and illegal and so builds loyalty among those involved. Rebel groups who have forced recruitment as opposed to volunteer recruits are more involved in rape, as it is believed the recruits start with less loyalty to the group. In Papua New Guinea, urban gangs such as Raskol gangs often require new members to rape women as part of their initiation.

Perpetrators of sex trafficking and cybersex trafficking allow or carry out rape for financial gain or sexual gratification. Rape pornography, including child pornography, is created for profit and other reasons. There have been instances of child sexual abuse and child rape videos on Pornhub.

== Effects ==
One metric used by the WHO to determine the severity of global rates of coercive, forced sexual activity was the question "Have you ever been forced to have sexual intercourse against your will?" Asking this question produced higher positive response rates than being asked, whether they had ever been abused or raped.

The WHO report describes the consequences of sexual abuse:

- Gynecological disorders
- Reproductive disorders
- Sexual disorders
- Infertility
- Pelvic inflammatory disease
- Pregnancy complications
- Miscarriage
- Sexual dysfunction
- Acquiring sexually transmitted infections, including HIV/AIDS
- Mortality from injuries
- Increased risk of suicide
- Depression
- Chronic pain
- Psychosomatic disorders
- Unsafe abortion
- Unwanted pregnancy (see Pregnancy from rape)

=== Emotional and psychological ===
Frequently, victims may not recognize what happened to them was rape. Some may remain in denial for years afterwards. Confusion over whether or not their experience constitutes rape is typical, especially for victims of psychologically coerced rape. Women may not identify their victimization as rape for many reasons such as feelings of shame, embarrassment, non-uniform legal definitions, reluctance to define the friend/partner as a rapist, or because they have internalized victim-blaming attitudes (internalized sexism). The public often perceives these behaviors as 'counterintuitive' and, therefore, as evidence of a dishonest woman.

Victims may react in ways they did not anticipate. After the rape, they may be uncomfortable/frustrated with and not understand their reactions. Most victims respond by 'freezing up' or becoming compliant and cooperative during the rape. These are common survival responses of all mammals. This can cause confusion for others and the person assaulted. An assumption is that someone being raped would call for help or struggle. A struggle would result in torn clothes or injuries.

Dissociation can occur during the assault. Memories may be fragmented especially immediately afterwards. They may consolidate with time and sleep. A man or boy who is raped may be stimulated and even ejaculate during the experience of the rape. A woman or girl may orgasm during a sexual assault. This may become a source of shame and confusion for those assaulted along with those who were around them.

Trauma symptoms may not show until years after the sexual assault occurred. Immediately following a rape, the survivor may react outwardly in a wide range of ways, from expressive to closed down; common emotions include distress, anxiety, shame, revulsion, helplessness, and guilt. Denial is not uncommon.

In the weeks following the rape, the survivor may develop symptoms of post-traumatic stress syndrome and may develop a wide array of psychosomatic complaints. PTSD symptoms include re-experiencing of the rape, avoiding things associated with the rape, numbness, and increased anxiety and startle response. The likelihood of sustained severe symptoms is higher if the rapist confined or restrained the person, if the person being raped believed the rapist would kill them, the person who was raped was very young or very old, and if the rapist was someone they knew. The likelihood of sustained severe symptoms is also higher if people around the survivor ignore (or are ignorant of) the rape or blame the rape survivor. Traumatic bonding is increased through empathy with the perpetrator while reduced by no contact.

Most people recover from rape in three to four months, but many have persistent PTSD that may manifest in anxiety, depression, substance abuse, irritability, anger, flashbacks, or nightmares. In addition, rape survivors may have long-term generalised anxiety disorder, may develop one or more specific phobias, major depressive disorder, and may experience difficulties with resuming their social life and with sexual functioning. People who have been raped are at higher risk of suicide.

Men experience similar psychological effects of being raped, but they are less likely to seek counseling.

Another effect of rape and sexual assault is the stress created in those who study rape or counsel the survivors. This is called vicarious traumatization.

=== Physical ===
The presence or absence of physical injury may be used to determine whether a person has been raped. Those who have experienced sexual assault yet have no physical trauma may be less inclined to report to the authorities or to seek health care.

While penetrative rape generally does not involve the use of a condom, in some cases a condom is used. The use of a condom significantly reduces the likelihood of pregnancy and disease transmission, both to the victim and the rapist. Rationales for condom use include: avoiding contracting infections or diseases (particularly HIV), especially in cases of rape of sex workers or in gang rape (to avoid contracting infections or diseases from fellow rapists); eliminating evidence, making prosecution more difficult (and giving a sense of invulnerability); giving the appearance of consent (in cases of acquaintance rape); and thrill from planning and the use of the condom as an added prop. Concern for the victim is generally not considered a factor.

=== Sexually transmitted infections ===
Those who have been raped have relatively more reproductive tract infections than those who have not been raped. HIV can be transmitted through rape. Acquiring AIDS through rape puts people at increased risk for psychological problems. Acquiring HIV through rape may lead to behaviors that create a risk of injecting drugs. Acquiring sexually transmitted infections increases the risk of acquiring HIV. The belief that having sex with a virgin can cure HIV/AIDS exists in parts of Africa. This leads to the rape of girls and women. The claim that the myth drives either HIV infection or child sexual abuse in South Africa is disputed by researchers Rachel Jewkes and Helen Epstein.

=== Victim blaming, secondary victimization and other mistreatment ===
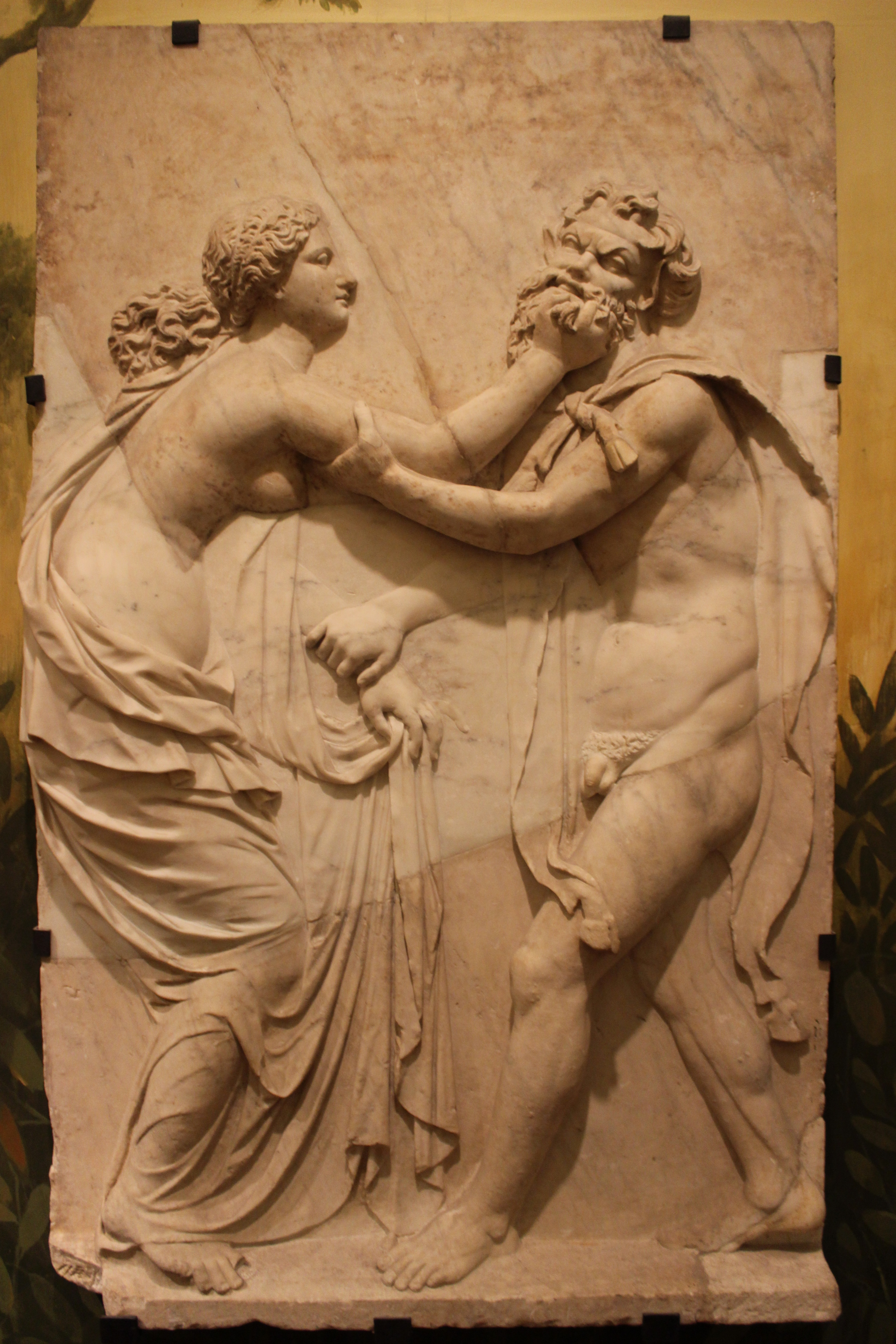
An example of the idealized female resistance: In this Roman depiction of a fight between a Nymph and a Satyr (Naples National Archaeological Museum), the Nymph is shown vigorously resisting the Satyr's sexual advances, punching him on the mouth – lack of which might be construed as implying consent.

Society's treatment of victims has the potential to exacerbate their trauma. People who have been raped or sexually assaulted are sometimes blamed and considered responsible for the crime. This refers to the just world fallacy and rape myth acceptance that certain victim behaviors (such as being intoxicated, flirting or wearing sexually provocative clothing) may encourage rape. In many cases, victims are said to have "asked for it" because of not resisting their assault or violating female gender expectations. A global survey of attitudes toward sexual violence by the Global Forum for Health Research shows that victim-blaming concepts are at least partially accepted in many countries. Women who have been raped are sometimes deemed to have behaved improperly. Usually, these are cultures where there is a significant social divide between the freedoms and status afforded to men and women.

"Rape victims are blamed more when they resist the attack later in the rape encounter rather than earlier (Kopper, 1996), which seems to suggest the stereotype that these women are engaging in token resistance (Malamuth & Brown, 1994; Muehlenhard & Rogers, 1998) or leading the man on because they have gone along with the sexual experience thus far. Finally, rape victims are blamed more when they are raped by an acquaintance or a date rather than by a stranger (e.g., Bell, Kuriloff, & Lottes, 1994; Bridges, 1991; Bridges & McGr ail, 1989; Check & Malamuth, 1983; Kanekar, Shaherwalla, Franco, Kunju, & Pinto, 1991; L'Armand & Pepitone, 1982; Tetreault & Barnett, 1987), which seems to evoke the stereotype that victims really want to have sex because they know their attacker and perhaps even went out on a date with him. The underlying message of this research seems to be that when certain stereotypical elements of rape are in place, rape victims are prone to being blamed."

Commentators state: "individuals may endorse rape myths and at the same time recognize the negative effects of rape." A number of gender role stereotypes can play a role in rationalization of rape. These include the idea that power is reserved to men whereas women are meant for sex and objectified, that women want forced sex and to be pushed around, and that male sexual impulses and behaviors are uncontrollable and must be satisfied.

For females, victim-blaming correlates with fear. Many rape victims blame themselves. Female jurors might look at the woman on the witness stand and believe she had done something to entice the defendant. In Chinese culture, victim-blaming is often associated with the crime of rape, as women are expected to resist rape using physical force. Thus, if rape occurs, it is considered to be at least partly the woman's fault, and her virtue is called into question.

==== Honor killings and forced marriages ====
In many cultures, those who are raped have a high risk of suffering additional violence or threats of violence after the rape. This can be perpetrated by the rapist, friends, or relatives of the rapist. The intent can be to prevent the victim from reporting the rape. Other reasons for threats against those assaulted is to punish them for reporting it, or of forcing them to withdraw the complaint. The relatives of the person who has been raped may wish to prevent "bringing shame" to the family and may also threaten them. This is especially the case in cultures where female virginity is highly valued and considered mandatory before marriage; in extreme cases, rape victims are killed in honor killings.

== Treatment ==
In the US, victims' rights include the right to have a victims advocate preside over every step of the medical/legal exam to ensure sensitivity towards victims, provide emotional support, and minimize the risk of re-traumatization. Victims are to be informed of this immediately by law enforcement or medical service providers. Emergency rooms of many hospitals employ sexual assault nurse/forensic examiners (SAN/FEs) with specific training to care for those who have experienced a rape or sexual assault. They are able to conduct a focused medical-legal exam. If such a trained clinician is not available, the emergency department has a sexual assault protocol that has been established for treatment and the collection of evidence. Staff are also trained to explain the examinations in detail, the documentation and the rights associated with the requirement for informed consent. Emphasis is placed on performing the examinations at a pace that is appropriate for the person, their family, their age, and their level of understanding. Privacy is recommended to prevent self-harm.

=== Non-genital injuries ===
==== Physical assessment ====
Many rapes do not result in serious physical injury. The first medical response to sexual assault is a complete assessment. This general assessment will prioritize the treatment of injuries by the emergency room staff. Medical personnel involved are trained to assess and treat those assaulted or follow protocols established to ensure privacy and best treatment practices. Informed consent is always required prior to treatment unless the person who was assaulted is unconscious, intoxicated or does not have the mental capacity to give consent. Priorities governing the physical exam are the treatment of serious life-threatening emergencies and then a general and complete assessment. Some physical injuries are readily apparent such as bites, broken teeth, swelling, bruising, lacerations and scratches. In more violent cases, the victim may need to have gunshot wounds or stab wounds treated. The loss of consciousness is relevant to the medical history. If abrasions are found, immunization against tetanus is offered if 5 years have elapsed since the last immunization.

==== Diagnostic testing ====
After the general assessment and treatment of serious injuries, further evaluation may include the use of additional diagnostic testing such as x-rays, CT or MRI image studies and blood work. The presence of infection is determined by sampling of body fluids from the mouth, throat, vagina, perineum, and anus.

==== Forensic sampling ====
Victims have the right to refuse any evidence collection. Victims advocates ensure the victims' wishes are respected by hospital staff. After the physical injuries are addressed and treatment has begun, then forensic examination proceeds along with the gathering of evidence that can be used to identify and document the injuries. Such evidence-gathering is only done with the complete consent of the patient or the caregivers of the patient. Photographs of the injuries may be requested by staff. At this point in the treatment, if a victims' advocate had not been requested earlier, experienced social support staff are made available to the patient and family.

If the patient or the caregivers (typically parents) agree, the medical team utilizes standardized sampling and testing usually referred to as a forensic evidence kit or "rape kit". The patient is informed that submitting to the use of the rape kit does not obligate them to file criminal charges against the perpetrator. The patient is discouraged from bathing or showering to obtain samples from their hair. Evidence gathered within the past 72 hours is more likely to be valid. The sooner that samples are obtained after the assault, the more likely that evidence is present in the sample and provides valid results. Once the injuries of the patient have been treated and she or he is stabilized, the sample gathering will begin. Staff will encourage the presence of a rape/sexual assault counselor to provide an advocate and reassurance.

During the medical exam, evidence of bodily secretions is assessed. Dried semen that is on clothing and skin can be detected with a fluorescent lamp. Notes will be attached to those items on which semen has been found. These specimens are marked, placed in a paper bag, and are marked for later analysis for the presence of seminal vesicle-specific antigen.

Though technically, medical staff are not part of the legal system, only trained medical personnel can obtain evidence that is admissible during a trial. Evidence is collected, signed, and locked in a secure place to guarantee that legal evidence procedures are maintained. This carefully monitored procedure of evidence collection and preservation is known as the chain of evidence. Maintaining the chain of evidence from the medical examination, testing, and tissue sampling from its origin of collection to court allows the results of the sampling to be admitted as evidence. Photography is often used for documentation.

=== After the examination ===
Some physical effects of the rape are not immediately apparent. Follow up examinations also assess the patient for tension headaches, fatigue, sleep pattern disturbances, gastrointestinal irritability, chronic pelvic pain, menstrual pain or irregularity, pelvic inflammatory disease, sexual dysfunction, premenstrual distress, fibromyalgia, vaginal discharge, vaginal itching, burning during urination, and generalized vaginal pain.

The World Health Organization recommends offering prompt access to emergency contraceptive medications which can significantly reduce risk of an undesired pregnancy if used within 5 days of rape; it is estimated that about 5% of male-on-female rapes result in pregnancy. When rape results in pregnancy, abortion pills can be safely and effectively used to end a pregnancy up to 10 weeks from the last menstrual period.

=== Genital injuries ===
An internal pelvic exam is not recommended for sexually immature or prepubescent girls due to the probability that internal injuries do not exist in this age group. However, an internal exam may be recommended if significant bloody discharge is observed. A complete pelvic exam for rape (anal or vaginal) is conducted. An oral exam is done if there have been injuries to the mouth, teeth, gums, or pharynx. Though the patient may have no complaints about genital pain signs of trauma can still be assessed. Before the complete bodily and genital exam, the patient is asked to undress, standing on a white sheet that collects any debris that may be in the clothing. The clothing and sheet are properly bagged and labeled along with other samples that can be removed from the body or clothing of the patient. Samples of fibers, mud, hair, or leaves are gathered if present. Samples of fluids are collected to determine the presence of the perpetrator's saliva and semen that may be present in the patient's mouth, vagina or rectum. Sometimes the victim has scratched the perpetrator in defense and fingernail scrapings can be collected.

Injuries to the genital areas can include swelling, lacerations, and bruising. Common genital injuries are anal injury, labial abrasions, hymenal bruising, and tears of the posterior fourchette and fossa. Bruises, tears, abrasions, inflammation and lacerations may be visible. If a foreign object was used during the assault, x-ray visualization will identify retained fragments. Genital injuries are more prevalent in post-menopausal women and prepubescent girls. Internal injuries to the cervix and vagina can be visualized using colposcopy. Using colposcopy has increased the detection of internal trauma from 6% to 53%. Genital injuries to children who have been raped or sexually assaulted differ in that the abuse may be on-going or may have happened in the past after the injuries heal. Scarring is one sign of the sexual abuse of children.

Several studies have explored the association between skin color and genital injury among rape victims. Many studies found a difference in rape-related injury based on race, with more injuries being reported for white females and males than for black females and males. This may be because the dark skin color of some victims obscures bruising. Examiners paying attention to victims with darker skin, especially the thighs, labia majora, posterior fourchette, and fossa navicularis, can help remedy this.

=== Infections ===
The presence of a sexually contracted infection can not be confirmed immediately after rape because it cannot be detected until 72 hours afterwards.

The person who was raped may already have a sexually transmitted infection and if diagnosed, it is treated. Prophylactic antibiotic treatment for vaginitis, gonorrhea, trichomoniasis and chlamydia may be performed and antiviral prophylaxis against HIV can be offered. Chlamydial and gonococcal infections in women are of particular concern due to the possibility of ascending infection. Immunization against hepatitis B is often considered. After prophylactic treatment is initiated, further testing is done to determine what other treatments may be necessary for other infections transmitted during the assault. These are:

- Serum hepatitis B surface antigen assay
- Microscopic evaluation of vaginal discharge (saline wash and staining)
- Cultures for Neisseria gonorrhoeae and Chlamydia trachomatis from each penetrated location
- Serum Venereal Disease Research Laboratory test
- Complete blood count (CBC)
- Liver function tests
- Serum creatinine level

Treatment may include the administration of zidovudine/lamivudine, tenofovir/emtricitabine, or ritonavir/lopinavir for prophylaxis against HIV. Information regarding other treatment options is available from the CDC.

The transmission of HIV is frequently a major concern of the patient. Prophylactic treatment for HIV is not necessarily administered. Routine treatment for HIV after rape or sexual assault is controversial due to the low risk of infection after one sexual assault. Transmission of HIV after one exposure to penetrative anal sex is estimated to be 0.5 to 3.25%. Transmission of HIV after one exposure to penetrative vaginal intercourse is 0.05 to 0.15%. HIV can also be contracted through the oral route but this is considered rare. Other recommendations are that the patient be treated prophylactically for HIV if the perpetrator is found to be infected. Where HIV is common, prophylaxis should be discussed and offered routinely.

Testing at the time of the initial exam does not typically have forensic value if patients are sexually active and have an STI since it could have been acquired before the assault. Rape shield laws protect the person who was raped and who has positive test results. These laws prevent having such evidence used against someone who was raped. Someone who was raped may be concerned that a prior infection may suggest sexual promiscuity. There may, however, be situations in which testing has a legal purpose, as in cases where the threat of transmission or actual transmission of an STI was part of the crime. In nonsexually active patients, an initial, baseline negative test that is followed by a subsequent STI could be used as evidence, if the perpetrator also had an STI.

Treatment failure is possible due to the emergence of antibiotic-resistant strains of pathogens.

=== Emotional and psychiatric ===
Psychiatric and emotional consequences can be apparent immediately after the rape and it may be necessary to treat these very early in the evaluation and treatment. Other treatable emotional and psychiatric disorders may not become evident until some time after the rape. These can be eating disorders, anxiety, fear, intrusive thoughts, fear of crowds, avoidance, anger, depression, humiliation, post-traumatic stress disorder (PTSD) hyperarousal, sexual disorders (including fear of engaging in sexual activity), mood disorders, suicidal ideation, borderline personality disorder, nightmares, fear of situations that remind the patient of the rape and fear of being alone, agitation, numbness and emotional distance. Victims are able to receive help by using a telephone hotline, counseling, or shelters. Recovery from sexual assault is a complicated and controversial concept, but support groups, usually accessed by organizations are available to help in recovery. Professional counseling and ongoing treatment by trained health care providers are often sought by the victim.

Some clinicians are specially trained in the treatment of those who have experienced rape and sexual assault/abuse. Treatment can be lengthy and challenging for both the counselor and the patient. Several treatment options exist and vary by accessibility, cost, or whether or not insurance coverage exists for the treatment. Treatment also varies depending upon the expertise of the counselor—some have more experience and or have specialized in the treatment of sexual trauma and rape. To be the most effective, a treatment plan should be developed based upon the struggles of the patient and not necessarily based upon the traumatic experience. An effective treatment plan will consider the following: current stressors, coping skills, physical health, interpersonal conflicts, self-esteem, family issues, involvement of the guardian, and the presence of mental health symptoms.

The degree of success for emotional and psychiatric treatments is often dependent upon the terminology used in the treatment, i.e. redefining the event and experience. Labels used like rape victim and rape survivor to describe the new identities of women who have been raped suggest that the event is the dominant and controlling influence on her life. These may affect supportive personnel. The consequences of using these labels need to be assessed. Positive outcomes of emotional and psychiatric treatment for rape exist; these can be an improved self-concept, the recognition of growth, and implementing new coping styles.

Short-term treatment with a benzodiazepine may help with anxiety (although caution is recommended with the use of these medications as people can become addicted and develop withdrawal symptoms after regular use) and antidepressants may be helpful for symptoms of post traumatic stress disorder, depression and panic attacks.

A perpetrator found guilty by the court is often required to receive treatment. There are many options for treatment, some more successful than others. The psychological factors that motivated the convicted perpetrator are complex but treatment can still be effective. A counselor will typically evaluate disorders that are currently present in the offender. Investigating the developmental background of the offender can help explain the origins of the abusive behavior that occurred in the first place. Emotional and psychological treatment has the purpose of identifying predictors of recidivism, or the potential that the offender will commit rape again. In some instances, neurological abnormalities have been identified in the perpetrators, and in some cases they have themselves experienced past trauma. Adolescents and other children can be the perpetrators of rape, although this is uncommon. In this instance, appropriate counseling and evaluation are usually conducted.

== Prosecution ==
=== Reporting ===
In 2005, sexual violence, and rape in particular, was considered the most under-reported violent crime in Great Britain. The number of reported rapes in Great Britain is lower than both incidence and prevalence rates. Victims who do not act in an expected or stereotypical way may not be believed, as happened in the case of a Washington state woman raped in 2008 who withdrew her report after facing police skepticism. Her rapist went on to assault several more women before being identified.

The legal requirements for reporting rape vary by jurisdiction—each US state may have different requirements. New Zealand has less stringent limits.

In Italy, a 2006 National Statistic Institute survey on sexual violence against women found that 91.6% of women who suffered this did not report it to the police.

In Japan, in 2018, Human Rights Watch reported that over 95% of incidents of sexual violence in Japan are not reported to police. In 2023, Japan adopted a new sex crime law that brought about several changes. It replaced "forcible sexual intercourse" with "non-consensual sexual intercourse" and further outlines eight scenarios considered rape, emphasizing one's ability to give consent within those situations. The new law also establishes grooming, voyeurism, and asking for sexual images of children under the age of 16 as crimes.

==== False accusation ====
A false accusation of rape is the reporting of a rape where no rape has occurred. It is difficult to assess the true prevalence of false rape allegations, but it is generally agreed by scholars that proven rape accusations are false about 2% to 10% of the time.

Another large-scale study was conducted in Australia, with 850 rapes reported to the Victoria police between 2000 and 2003 (Heenan & Murray, 2006). Using both quantitative and qualitative methods, the researchers examined 812 cases and found 15.1% of complaints were withdrawn, 46.4% were marked "no further police action", and 2.1% of the total were "clearly" classified by police as false reports. In these cases, the alleged victim was either charged with filing a false police report, or threatened with charges, and the complaint subsequently withdrawn.

According to Statistics Canada, 19% and 14% of sexual assault allegations were deemed unfounded in 2016 and 2017, respectively. Cases declared to be unfounded are cases where police determined that the assault did not occur and was not attempted.

In the United Kingdom, the Crown Prosecution Service (CPS) analyzed every rape complaint made over a 17-month period and found that "the indication is that it is therefore extremely rare that a suspect deliberately makes a false allegation of rape or domestic violence purely out of malice."

FBI reports consistently put the number of "unfounded" rape accusations around 8%. The unfounded rate is higher for forcible rape than for any other Index crime. The average rate of unfounded reports for Index crimes is 2%. "Unfounded" is not synonymous with a false allegation. Bruce Gross of the Forensic Examiner described it as meaningless, saying a report could be marked as unfounded if there is no physical evidence or the alleged victim did not sustain any physical injuries.

Other studies have suggested that the rate of false allegations in the United States may be higher. A nine-year study by Eugene J. Kanin of Purdue University in a small metropolitan area in the Midwestern United States claimed that 41% of rape accusations were false. However, David Lisak, an associate professor of psychology and director of the Men's Sexual Trauma Research Project at the University of Massachusetts Boston states that "Kanin's 1994 article on false allegations is a provocative opinion piece, but it is not a scientific study of the issue of false reporting of rape". He further states that Kanin's study has a significantly poor systematic methodology and had no independent definition of a false report. Instead, Kanin classified reports that the police department classified as false also as false. The criterion for falsehood was simply a denial of a polygraph test of the accuser. A 1998 report by the National Institute of Justice found that DNA evidence excluded the primary suspect in 26% of rape cases and concluded that this "strongly suggests that postarrest and postconviction DNA exonerations are tied to some strong, underlying systemic problems that generate erroneous accusations and convictions". However, this study also noted that analyzed samples involved a specific subset of rape cases (e.g. those where "there is no consent defense").

A 2010 study by David Lisak, Lori Gardinier and other researchers published in the journal of Violence against Women found that out of 136 cases reported in a ten-year period, 5.9% were found likely to be false. A 2018 study in the UK by Lesley McMillan published in the Journal of Gender Studies found that although police estimated 5–95% of rape claims were likely to be false, the analysis showed no more than 3–4% were possible to be evidenced as "fabricated'.

=== Conviction ===
In the United Kingdom, in 1970, there was a 33% rate of conviction, while by 1985 there was a 24% conviction rate for rape trials in the UK; by 2004, the conviction rate reached 5%. At that time the government report has expressed documented the year-on-year increase in attrition of reported rape cases, and pledged to address this "justice gap". According to Amnesty International, Ireland had the lowest rate of conviction for rape, (1%) among 21 European states, in 2003. In America as of 2012, there exists a noticeable discrepancy in conviction rates among women of various ethnic identities; an arrest was made in just 13% of the sexual assaults reported by American Indian women, compared with 35% for black women and 32% for whites.

In 2024, the University of Cambridge did a study on rape in Japan. They found that while Japanese police claim to solve 97% of rape cases, only 5–10% of rape victims report it to police, and police record less than half of reported cases while prosecutors charge about one-third of recorded cases. Also for every 1000 rapes in Japan, only 10–20 (1–2%) result in the offender being charged and convicted.

Judicial bias due to rape myths and preconceived notions about rape is a salient issue in rape conviction, but voir dire intervention may be used to curb such bias.

== Statistics ==
International Crime on Statistics and Justice by the United Nations Office on Drugs and Crime (UNODC) find that worldwide, most victims of rape are women and most perpetrators male. Rapes against women are rarely reported to the police and the number of female rape victims is significantly underestimated. Southern Africa, Oceania, and North America report the highest numbers of rape.

Most rape is committed by someone the victim knows. By contrast, rape committed by strangers is relatively uncommon. Statistics reported by the Rape, Abuse & Incest National Network (RAINN) in the United States indicate that 7 out of 10 cases of sexual assault involved a perpetrator known to the victim.

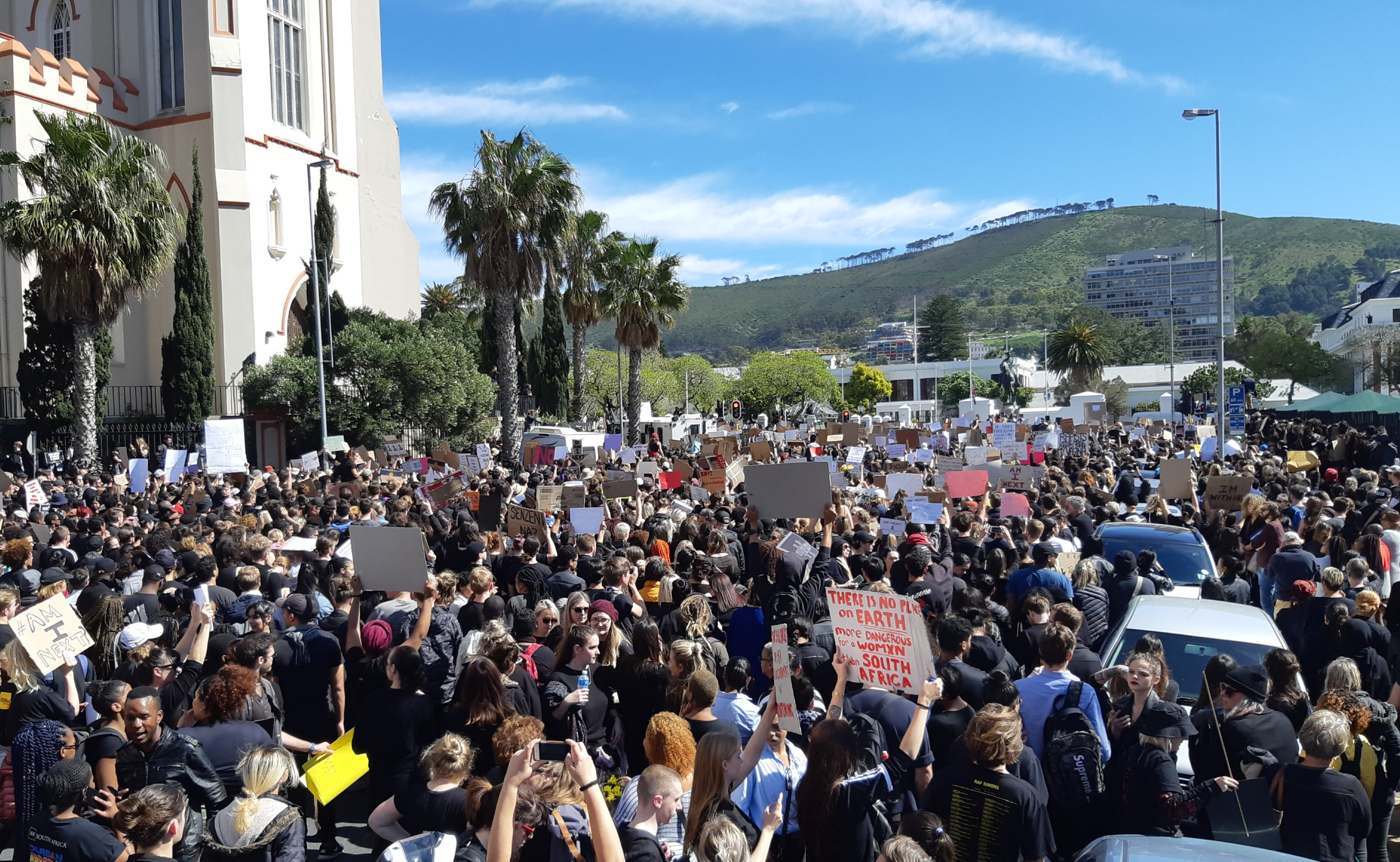
Demonstration against sexual violence in South Africa following the murder of Uyinene Mrwetyana, 2019

The humanitarian news organization IRIN claims that an estimated "500,000 rapes are committed annually in South Africa once called 'the world's rape capital.' The country has some of the highest incidences of child sexual abuse in the world with more than 67,000 cases of rape and sexual assaults against children reported in 2000, with welfare groups believing that unreported incidents could be up to 10 times higher. Current data suggest that the incidence of rape has risen significantly in India.

Most rape research and reports of rape are limited to male–female forms of rape. Research on male-on-male and female-on-male rape is rare. Fewer than one in ten male–male rapes are reported. As a group, males who have been raped by either gender often get little services and support, and legal systems are often ill-equipped to deal with this type of crime. Instances in which the perpetrator is female may not be clear and can lead to dismissing women as sexual aggressors, which can obscure the dimensions of the problem. Research also suggests that men with peers who display sexually aggressive behaviour are more likely to adopt the same behaviour.

Risk factors vary among different ethnicities in the United States. About one third of African American adolescent females report encountering some form of sexual assault including rape. One in three Native American women will experience sexual assault, more than twice the national average for American women.

== Deterrence and prevention ==
As sexual violence affects all parts of society, the response to sexual violence is comprehensive. The responses can be categorized as individual approaches, healthcare responses, community-based efforts, and actions to prevent other forms of sexual violence.

Sexual assault may be prevented by secondary school, college, and workplace education programs. At least one program for fraternity men produced "sustained behavioral change." With regard to campus sexual assault, nearly two thirds of students reported knowing victims of rape, and in one study over half reported knowing perpetrators of sexual assault; one in ten reported knowing a victim of rape; and nearly one in four reported knowing a victim of alcohol-facilitated rape.

== History ==
=== Definitions and evolution of laws ===
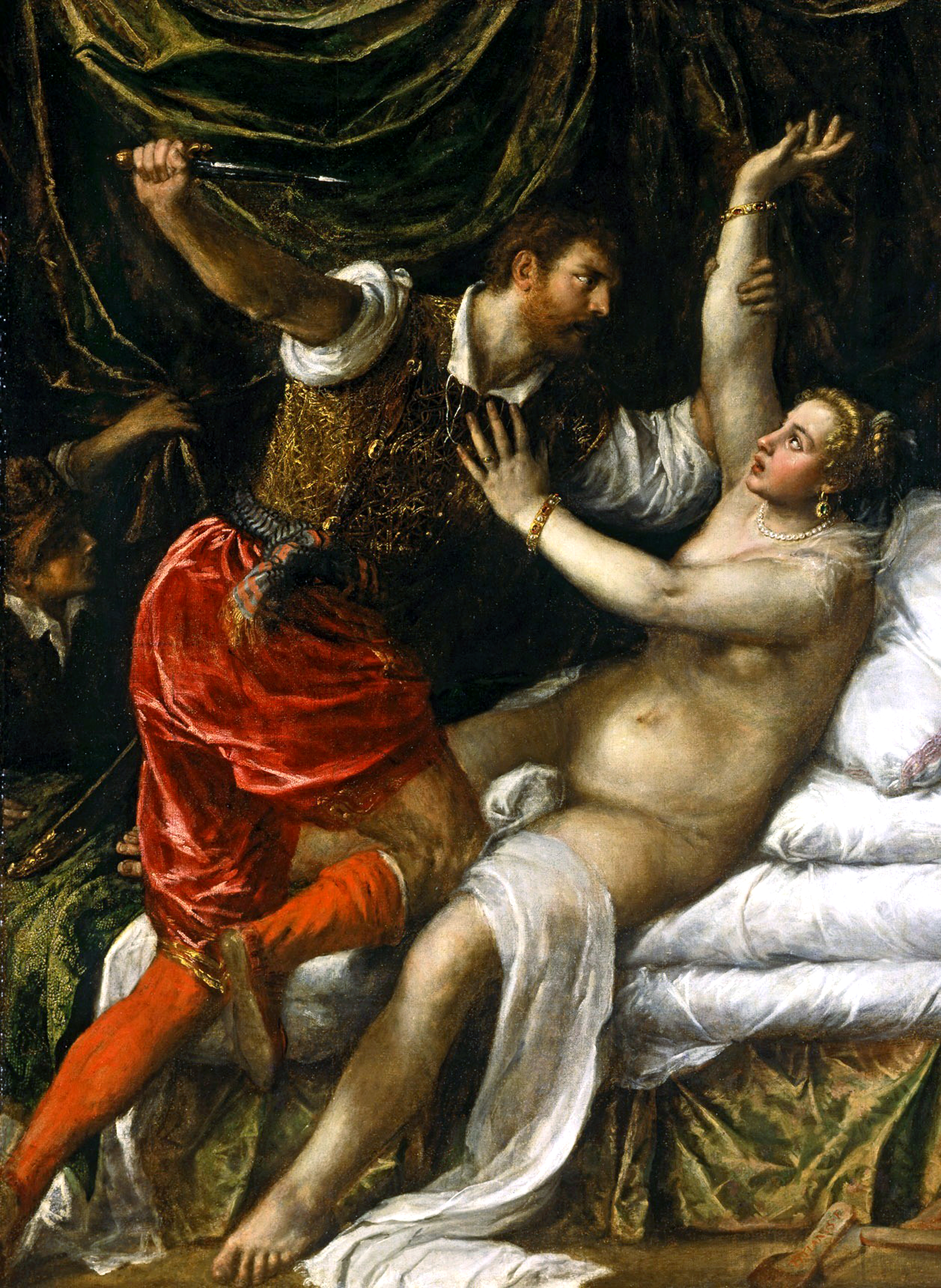
Tarquin and Lucretia, by Titian, 1571. According to ancient Roman legend, the rape of Lucretia by the king's son led to the formation of the Roman Republic.

Virtually all societies have had a concept of the crime of rape. Although what constituted this crime has varied by historical period and culture, the definitions tended to focus around an act of forced vaginal intercourse perpetrated through physical violence or imminent threat of death or severe bodily injury, by a man, on a woman, or a girl, not his wife. The actus reus of the crime, was, in most societies, the insertion of the penis into the vagina. The way sexuality was conceptualized in many societies rejected the very notion that a woman could force a man into sex—women were often seen as passive while men were deemed to be assertive and aggressive. Sexual penetration of a male by another male fell under the legal domain of sodomy.

Rape laws existed to protect virginal daughters from rape. In these cases, a rape done to a woman was seen as an attack on the estate of her father because she was his property and a woman's virginity being taken before marriage lessened her value; if the woman was married, the rape was an attack on the husband because it violated his property. The rapist was either subject to payment or severe punishment. The father could rape or keep the rapist's wife or make the rapist marry his daughter. A man could not be charged with raping his wife since she was his property. Thus, marital rape was allowed. Author Winnie Tomm stated, "By contrast, rape of a single woman without strong ties to a father or husband caused no great concern." An incident could be excluded from the definition of rape due to the relation between the parties, such as marriage, or due to the background of the victim. In many cultures forced sex on a prostitute, slave, war enemy, member of a racial minority, etc., was not rape.

From the classical antiquity of Greece and Rome into the Colonial period, rape along with arson, treason and murder was a capital offense. "Those committing rape were subject to a wide range of capital punishments that were seemingly brutal, frequently bloody, and at times spectacular." In the 12th century, kinsmen of the victim were given the option of executing the punishment themselves. "In England in the early fourteenth century, a victim of rape might be expected to gouge out the eyes and/or sever the offender's testicles herself." Despite the harshness of these laws, actual punishments were usually far less severe: in late Medieval Europe, cases concerning rapes of marriageable women, wives, widows, or members of the lower class were rarely brought forward, and usually ended with only a small monetary fine or a marriage between the victim and the rapist.

In ancient Greece and Rome, both male-on-female and male-on-male concepts of rape existed. Roman laws allowed three distinct charges for the crime: stuprum, unsanctioned sexual intercourse (which, in the early times, also included adultery); vis, a physical assault for purpose of lust; and iniuria, a general charge denoting any type of assault upon a person. The aforementioned Lex Iulia specifically criminalized per vim stuprum, unsanctioned sexual intercourse by force. The former two were public criminal charges which could be brought whenever the victim was a woman or a child of either gender, but only if the victim was a freeborn Roman citizen (ingenuus), and carried a potential sentence of death or exile. Iniuria was a civil charge that demanded monetary compensation, and had a wider application (for example, it could have been brought in case of sexual assault on a slave by a person other than their owner.) Augustus Caesar enacted reforms for the crime of rape under the assault statute Lex Iulia de vi publica, which bears his family name, Iulia. It was under this statute rather than the adultery statute of Lex Iulia de adulteriis that Rome prosecuted this crime. Rape was made into a "public wrong" (iniuria publica) by the Roman Emperor Constantine.

In contrast to the modern understanding of the subject, Romans drew clear distinctions between "active" (penetrative) and "passive" (receptive) partners, and all these charges implied penetration by the assailant (which necessarily ruled out the possibility of female-on-male or female-on-female rape.) It is not clear which (if any) of these charges applied to assaults upon an adult male, though such an assault upon a citizen was definitely seen as a grave insult (within Roman culture, an adult male citizen could not possibly consent to the receptive role in sexual intercourse without a severe loss of status.) The law known as Lex Scantinia covered at least some forms of male-on-male stuprum, and Quintillian mentions a fine of 10,000 sesterces – about 10 years' worth of a Roman legionnaire's pay – as a normal penalty for stuprum upon an ingenuus. However, its text is lost and its exact provisions are no longer known.

Emperor Justinian continued the use of the statute to prosecute rape during the sixth century in the Eastern Roman Empire. By late antiquity, the general term raptus had referred to abduction, elopement, robbery, or rape in its modern meaning. Confusion over the term led ecclesiastical commentators on the law to differentiate it into raptus seductionis (elopement without parental consent) and raptus violentiae (ravishment). Both of these forms of raptus had a civil penalty and possible excommunication for the family and village receiving the abducted woman, although raptus violentiae also incurred punishments of mutilation or death.

In the United States, a husband could not be charged with raping his wife until 1979. In the 1950s, in some states in the US, a white woman having consensual sex with a black man was considered rape. Prior to the 1930s, rape was considered a sex crime that was always committed by men and always done to women. From 1935 to 1965, a shift from labeling rapists as criminals to believing them to be mentally ill "sexual psychopaths" began making its way into popular opinion. Men caught for committing rape were no longer sentenced to prison but admitted to mental health hospitals where they would be given medication for their illness. Because only men deemed insane were the ones considered to have committed rape, no one considered the everyday person to be capable of such violence.

Transitions in women's roles in society were also shifting, causing alarm and blame towards rape victims. Because women were becoming more involved in the public (i.e. searching for jobs rather than being a housewife), some people claimed that these women were "loose" and looking for trouble. Giving up the gender roles of mother and wife was seen as defiant against traditional values while immersing themselves within society created the excuse that women would "not [be] entitled to protection under the traditional guidelines for male-female relationships".

Until the 19th century, many jurisdictions required ejaculation for the act to constitute the offense of rape. Acts other than vaginal intercourse did not constitute rape in common law countries and in many other societies. In many cultures, such acts were illegal, even if they were consensual and performed between married couples (see sodomy laws). In England, for example, the Buggery Act 1533, which remained in force until 1828, provided for the death penalty for "buggery". Many countries criminalized "non-traditional" forms of sexual activity well into the modern era: notably, in the US state of Idaho, sodomy between consensual partners was punishable by a term of five years to life in prison as late as 2003, and this law was only ruled to be inapplicable to married couples in 1995. Today, in many countries, the definition of the actus reus has been extended to all forms of penetration of the vagina and anus (e.g. penetration with objects, fingers (digital rape) or other body parts) as well as insertion of the penis in the mouth.

In the United States, before and during the American Civil War when chattel slavery was widespread, the law focused primarily on rape as it pertained to black men raping white women. The penalty for such a crime in many jurisdictions was death or castration. The rape of a black woman, by any man, was considered legal. As early as the 19th century, American women were criticized if they "stray[ed] out of a [dependent] position...fought off [an] attacker...[or] behaved in too self reliant a manner..." in which case "the term rape no longer applied".

In 1998, Judge Navanethem Pillay of the International Criminal Tribunal for Rwanda said: "From time immemorial, rape has been regarded as spoils of war. Now it will be considered a war crime. We want to send out a strong message that rape is no longer a trophy of war."

In Aydin v Turkey, the European Court of Human Rights ruled for the first time that rape amounts to torture, thus violating article 3 of the European Convention on Human Rights. It stated, "Rape of a detainee by an official of the State must be considered to be an especially grave and abhorrent form of ill-treatment given the ease with which the offender can exploit the vulnerability and weakened resistance of his victim."

In M.C. v Bulgaria, the Court found that the use of violence on the part of the perpetrator is not a necessary condition for a sexual act to be qualified as rape. It stated, "Indeed, rapists often employ subtle coercion or bullying when this is sufficient to overcome their victims. In most cases of rape against children, violence is not necessary to obtain submission. Courts are also recognizing that some women become frozen with fear at the onset of a sexual attack and thus cannot resist."

=== War rape ===
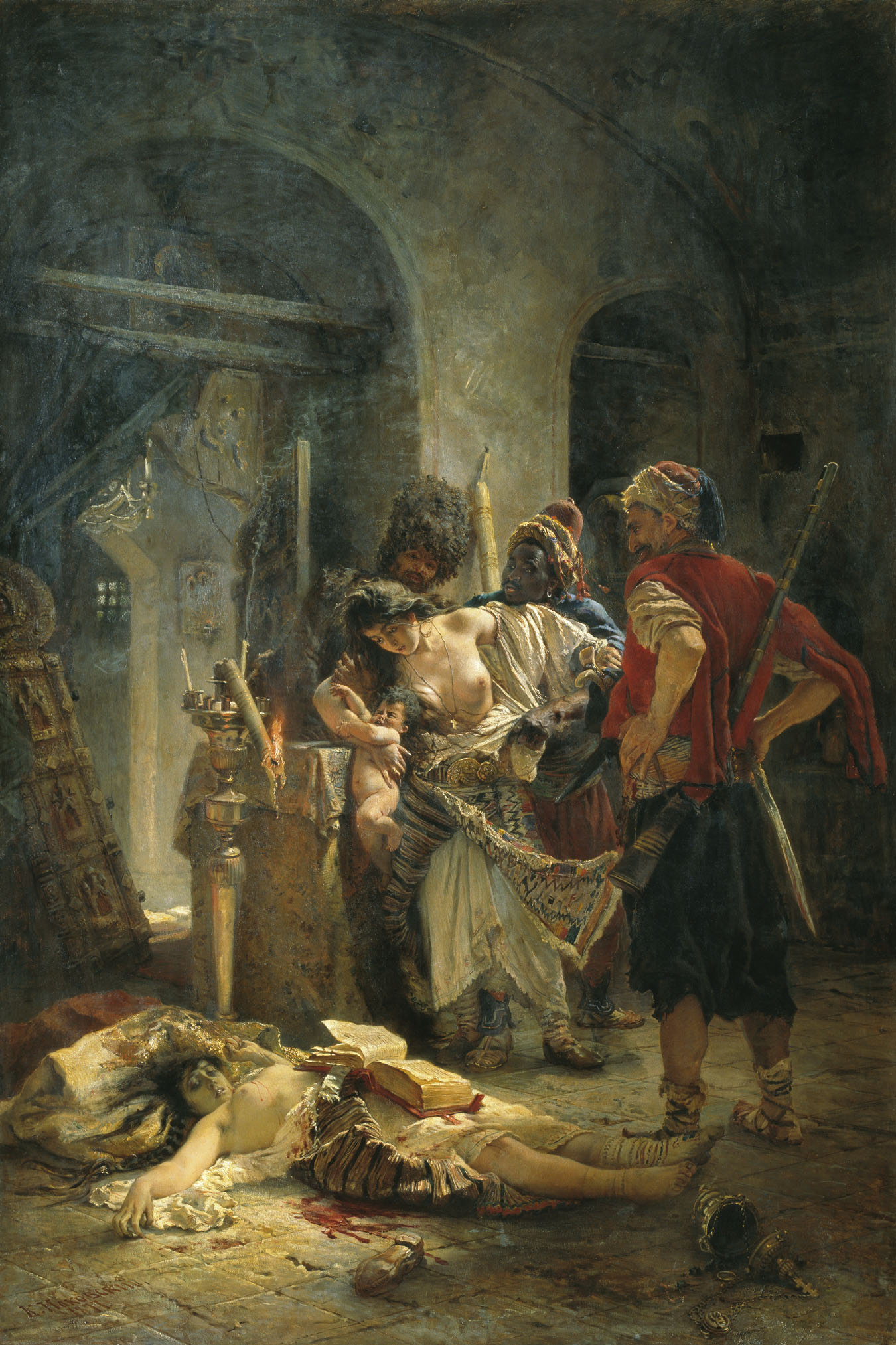
The Bulgarian martyresses, a painting depicting the rape of Bulgarian women by Ottoman troops during the April Uprising of 1876

Rape, in the course of war, dates back to antiquity, ancient enough to have been mentioned in the Bible. When Amazon's Yanomami tribes fought and raided nearby tribes, women were often raped and brought back to the shabono to be adopted into the captor's community.

The Mongols, who established the Mongol Empire across much of Eurasia, caused much destruction during their invasions.

Historian Jack Weatherford said that the earliest incident of mass rape attributed to Mongols took place after Ogodei Khan sent an army of 25,000 soldiers to North China, where they defeated an army of 100,000. The Mongols were said to have raped the surviving soldiers at the command of their leader. Ogodei Khan was also said to have ordered mass rapes of the Oirat. According to Rogerius of Apulia, a monk who survived the Mongol invasion of Hungary, the Mongol warriors "found pleasure" in humiliating local women.

The systematic rape of as many as 80,000 women by the Japanese soldiers during the six weeks of the Nanjing Massacre is an example of such atrocities. During World War II, an estimated 200,000 Korean and Chinese women were forced into prostitution in Japanese military brothels as so-called "comfort women". French Moroccan troops, known as Goumiers, committed rapes and other war crimes after the Battle of Monte Cassino. (See Marocchinate.) French women in Normandy reported rapes during the liberation of Normandy.

Rapes were committed by Wehrmacht forces on Jewish women and girls during the Invasion of Poland in September 1939; they were also committed against Polish, Ukrainian, Belarusian and Russian women, and girls during mass executions which were primarily carried out by the Selbstschutz units, with the assistance of Wehrmacht soldiers who were stationed in territory that was under the administration of the German military; the rapes were committed against female captives before they were shot. Only one case of rape was prosecuted by a German court during the military campaign in Poland, and even then the German judge found the perpetrator guilty of Rassenschande (committing a shameful act against his race as defined by the racial policy of Nazi Germany) rather than rape. Jewish women were particularly vulnerable to rape during The Holocaust.

Rapes were also committed by German forces stationed on the Eastern Front, where they were largely unpunished (as opposed to rapes committed in Western Europe). The Wehrmacht also established a system of military brothels, in which young women and girls from occupied territories were forced into prostitution under harsh conditions. In the Soviet Union, women were kidnapped by German forces for prostitution as well; one report by the International Military Tribunal writes "in the city of Smolensk the German Command opened a brothel for officers in one of the hotels into which hundreds of women and girls were driven; they were mercilessly dragged down the street by their arms and hair."

Rapes happened in territories occupied by the Red Army. A female Soviet war correspondent described what she had witnessed: "The Russian soldiers were raping every German female from eight to eighty. It was an army of rapists." According to German historian Miriam Gebhardt, as many as 190,000 women were raped by U.S. soldiers in Germany.

According to researcher and author Krisztián Ungváry, some 38,000 civilians were killed during the Siege of Budapest: about 13,000 from military action and 25,000 from starvation, disease and other causes. Included in the latter figure are about 15,000 Jews, largely victims of executions by Hungarian Arrow Cross Party militia. When the Soviets finally claimed victory, they initiated an orgy of violence, including the wholesale theft of anything they could lay their hands on, random executions and mass rape. An estimated 50,000 women and girls were raped, (Note: "The worst suffering of the Hungarian population is due to the rape of women. Rapes—affecting all age groups from ten to seventy are so common that very few women in Hungary have been spared." Swiss embassy report cited in Ungváry 2005, p.350. (Krisztian Ungvary The Siege of Budapest 2005)) although estimates vary from 5,000 to 200,000. Hungarian girls were kidnapped and taken to Red Army quarters, where they were imprisoned, repeatedly raped and sometimes murdered.

During the October 7 attacks, Israeli women, girls and men were reportedly subjected to sexual violence, including rape and sexual assault by Hamas or other Gazan militants. The extent of sexual violence perpetrated by militants, and whether it was planned and weaponised by the attackers, has been the subject of intense debate and controversy. Initially said to be "dozens" by Israeli authorities, they later clarified they could not provide a number. The militants involved in the attack are accused of having committed acts of gender-based violence, war crimes, and crimes against humanity. Hamas has denied that its fighters committed any sexual assaults, and has called for an impartial international investigation into the accusations.

In January 2024, it was reported that several victims of sexual violence from 7 October and captivity in Gaza had come forward. A number of initial testimonies of sexual violence were later discredited, while Israel has accused international human rights groups of downplaying assault reports. As of January 2025, the former head of the security cases division in Israel's Southern District prosecutor's office said that no case was being filed due to a lack of evidence and complainants, which she said could be due to victims being dead or unwilling to come forward.

In May 2026 the media published articles on systematic and intentional sexual abuse by Hamas and its collaborators on Oct 7, during the abduction of captives and during captivity, including rape, gang rape, forcing families to engage in sex with each other, mutilation and general sexual terror, based on a 300-page the report called Silenced No More.

During the ongoing Gaza war, Israeli male and female soldiers, guards, medical staff have reportedly committed wartime sexual violence against Palestinian women, children and men including rape, gang-rape, sexualized torture, and genital mutilation. In February 2024, UN experts cited at least two cases of Palestinian women being raped by male Israeli soldiers. Palestinian boys and men have also been raped and subjected to torture, and in some cases, the impact of rape and torture has led to death of the victim.

In its June 2024 investigative report, the UN's Independent International Commission of Inquiry on the Occupied Palestinian Territory (CoI) concluded: "The frequency, prevalence and severity of sexual and gender-based crimes perpetrated against Palestinians since 7 October across the Occupied Palestinian Territories (OPT) indicate that specific forms of Sexual and gender-based violence (SGBV) are part of Israeli Security Forces (ISF) operating procedures."

== See also ==
- A Natural History of Rape
- Against Our Will
- Abusive power and control
- Child grooming
- Courtship disorder
- Criminal transmission of HIV
- Emergency contraception (the morning after pill)
- Factors associated with being a victim of sexual violence
- Fiction about rape
- Nicaea (mythology) (traumatic rape in Greek Mythology)
- Post-assault treatment of sexual assault victims
- Rape culture
- Sexual violence by intimate partners
- Serial rapist
- Special Victims Unit (also known as the Sex Crimes Unit)
- Women Against Rape
