= Kelvin Alaneme =

Nigerian entrepreneur and singer

- Born: Kelvin Uzoma Alaneme; Onitsha, Anambra State
- Other names: Dr. Alams
- Occupations: Entrepreneur; medical doctor
- Years active: 2012—present
- Website: careeredu.co.uk

Kelvin Uzoma Alaneme (born 20 August 1987) is a Nigerian entrepreneur, medical doctor, and singer. He is known primarily as the founder of CareerEdu, a platform that facilitates educational and relocation opportunities to the United Kingdom for international students.

== Life ==
Alaneme was born on 20 August 1987 in Onitsha, Anambra State, Nigeria. Alaneme attended All Saints Primary School, Onitsha for his primary education and Federal Government College, Nise for his secondary education. In 2011, he graduated from University of Nigeria, Nsukka with a bachelor's degree in Medical and Surgery and a master's degree in Public Health from Glasgow Caledonian University in 2021.

Alaneme debuted his musical career in 2014 with the single "Ala Africa". After a series of singles, he released his first extended play Survivors in 2016. This was followed by Odogwu and Nobody Better.

During the #EndSARS movement, Alaneme launched CareerEdu—to help Nigerians search for greener pasture—due to the poor reaction of the Nigerian government to the Lekki shootings.

== Writing ==
in 2025, Alaneme released his first book, a novel titled "Nothing Spoil,". Generally, the book has received high praise. The writer, Hannu Afere reviewed the book in This Day Live, calling it a deep layered tale of survival, suffering and sweet redemption. He highlights Alaneme's ability to wrestle hope from the dark with the muscle of his writing when he says:

Alaneme doesn’t flinch from the dark, but he also doesn’t dwell there. His ultimate message is one of hope: that pain does not have the last word, and that even the most shattered life can be stitched back together with time, courage, and just a little help from the people who still see your worth.

== Controversy ==
In March 2025, the BBC published an undercover investigation which alleged that Kelvin Alaneme and others were involved in misleading prospective Nigerian students about UK education and immigration pathways. The documentary claimed that some education consultants were exploiting loopholes in the UK’s immigration system to sell "dreams" of relocation with minimal academic engagement.
