= The Spoken Word Project =

Educational research project

The Spoken Word Project was an educational research project based in Britain and the United States which ran from 2003 to 2008.

The multi-million dollar project is part of the JISC/NSF funded Digital Libraries in the Classroom Programme and aimed to provide tools appropriate for the digital classroom by exploiting the educational potential of the interests and activities of the social networking generation.

== Partners ==
The project was a partnership between Glasgow Caledonian University, Northwestern University, Michigan State University and BBC Information and Archives.

The lead British institution was Glasgow Caledonian University, with the team based at the Saltire Centre.

The project had a unique ‘legal deposit’ agreement with the BBC that allows access to the BBC archives "for educational uses only". Television and radio programmes from the BBC archives and other sources were then made available in a digital form through the website to educational users across the UK, the EU, the US and beyond. These digitised materials were put to varying educational uses.

== Inception ==
The foundations for the project were first laid down in the early 1990s when the eventual Principal Investigator of the project, David Donald, met Professor Jerry Goldman of Northwestern University through what was eventually incarnated as the Internet in the form that we are presently familiar with.
