= Cue =

Cue or CUE may refer to:

== Event markers ==
- Sensory cue, in perception (experimental psychology)
  - Cueing (medicine), rehabilitation techniques for Parkinson's disease patients to improve walking
- Cue (theatrical), the trigger for an action to be carried out at a specific time, in theatre or film
- Cue (show control), the electronic rendering of the specific action(s) to be carried out at a specific time by a show control system
- Voice cue, in dance, words or sounds that help match rhythmic patterns of steps with the music
- Cue mark, in motion picture film to signal projectionists of reel changes
- Cue, a vocal message given by a group fitness instructor to inform participants of upcoming sequences, such as a change in stretching direction

== Music and audio ==
- Cue (band), a Swedish musical group
- Cue tone, a message consisting of audio tones, used to prompt an action.
- Cue (audio), to determine the desired initial playback point in a piece of recorded music
- Cue sheet (computing), a metadata file that describes how the tracks of an audio track are laid out
- Source cue, music that emanates from an element visible within a theatrical or movie scene, like a piano, jukebox or car radio
- Musical cue, on sheet music helps ensemble musicians to coordinate their playing. It may also refer to a musical trigger for a theatrical cue
- "Cue", a song by Yellow Magic Orchestra from their 1981 album BGM

== People ==
- Cue (surname)

== Places ==
- Cue, Western Australia, a gold mining town
- Shire of Cue, Western Australia
- Cué, a village in Llanes, Asturias, Spain

== Organizations ==
- Catholic University in Erbil, Iraq
- Chinju National University of Education, South Korea
- Concordia University of Edmonton, Canada
- Consumers United for Evidence-based Healthcare, United States
- Kraków University of Economics, Poland

== Other uses ==
- Cue (clothing), an Australian clothing store chain
- Cue (magazine), a former weekly magazine covering entertainment in New York City
- Cue (search engine), a defunct website and app
- CUE (Toyota robot), an AI-powered, now-7'2" tall, humanoid, basketball-playing robot first developed by Toyota volunteers in 2017 to achieve perfect shooting accuracy from anywhere on the basketball court, with recently improved versions, including CUE2, CUE3, CUE4, CUE5, CUE6, and CUE7
- Cue! (video game), Japanese mobile game
- Cue stick, in billiard-type games
- Cue bid, a type of bid in the card game contract bridge
- "Cue" (among other spellings), a spelled-out name for the letter Q in the English alphabet
- ".cue", used in the filename of cue sheets, descriptor files for specifying the layout of CD or DVD tracks
- Commercially useful enzymes
- CUE Bus (City. University. Everyone.), the local bus system operated by the city of Fairfax, Virginia, United States
- The circular unitary ensemble, in mathematics
- Cue Ball Cat, the 54th American Tom and Jerry cartoon directed by William Hanna and Joseph Barbera, released in 1950
- Gabino Cué Monteagudo (born 1966), Mexican politician
- Commonwealth United Entertainment, an "instant major studio" of the late 1960s

== See also ==
- Cue sheet (disambiguation)
- OnCue
- On Cue
- Q (disambiguation)
- Que (disambiguation)
- Queue (disambiguation)
- Trigger (disambiguation)
- Stimulus (disambiguation)
