= McCue =

McCue is an Irish surname.

Notable people with the surname include:

- Alec McCue, Scottish footballer
- Anne McCue, an Australian country singer
- Clarrie McCue (1927–1992), former administrative head of the Australian Antarctic Territory
- Duncan McCue, Canadian television reporter
- Frances McCue, an award-winning poet and arts administrator
- Gerald M. McCue (born 1928), American architect
- Harry McCue, former Irish footballer and manager
- J. J. McCue, a former mayor of Boise, Idaho
- James McCue (born 1975), Scottish footballer
- James A. McCue, U.S. Navy, radio mechanic for whom Mount McCue is named
- James S. McCue (1861–1905), American politician and murderer from Virginia
- Jane McCue Sands, sponsor of the US Navy destroyer USS Sands (DD-243)
- John McCue (footballer) (1922–1999) an English football player.
- John B. McCue, US politician
- Kate McCue, American cruise ship captain
- Loretta B. McCue, sponsor of the US Navy minesweeper USS Sagacity (MSO-469)
- Martin G. McCue (1875–1932), New York politician
- Mike McCue, co-founder of Tellme Networks
- Patrick McCue (1883–1962), Australian dual-code rugby footballer
- Paul McCue (born 1958), British military historian and writer
- Tommy McCue, English rugby league footballer
- Ruth McCue Bell, the maiden name of Ruth Graham
- Peter McCue Chief Scaler of the province of New Brunswick

Fictional characters:

- Father McCue, a minor character in the television series The X-Files

== See also ==
- Peter McCue, a racehorse
- The McCue Center, a building at the University of Virginia named after Dr. Frank C. Mccue III
- The original name of Friend, Kansas, after Basil M. McCue
- Mount McCue, a mountain in Antarctica, named for James A. McCue
