= Space Tourism Society =

The Space Tourism Society is a California 501(c)3 non-profit organization founded in 1996 by John Spencer, a former member of the board of directors of the National Space Society, with the goal of promoting space tourism.

The STS is based in the US and has chapters in Japan, Norway, Canada, Malaysia, India, Russia, and the United Kingdom. It is an organization member of the Alliance for Space Development.

== Members ==
As of July 2013, the president of the society, John Spencer, is designing a 91-metre (300 ft) space yacht aimed at cruising in Earth orbit.

== See also ==
- Commercial astronaut
- Private spaceflight
- Quasi Universal Intergalactic Denomination
