= Quid =

Quid may refer to:

- Quasi Universal Intergalactic Denomination, a proposed "space currency" created as a viral marketing campaign launched by Travelex
- Quid, nickname for the pound (currency), most commonly of British sterling
  - slang for Euro in Ireland
- The Quid, a Canadian garage rock band from Winnipeg, Manitoba
- Quid (encyclopedia), a French encyclopedia, established in 1963 by Dominique Frémy
- Quid Inc., a private software and services company, specializing in text-based data analysis
- Tertium quids (sometimes quids), various factions of the Democratic-Republican Party in the United States during the period 1804–1812

== See also ==
- Kwid (disambiguation)
- Quid pro quo
