= CareerEdu =

Nigerian online education platform

- Website type: Private
- Founded: 2020
- Area served: Nigeria
- Founder: Kelvin Alaneme
- Industry: Online education platform
- Website: careeredu.co.uk
- Users: ▲50,000 (2023)

CareerEdu is a Nigerian online education platform that aids in immigration. It was founded in 2020 by Kelvin Alaneme.

Following the 2020 Lekki shooting and the denial of casualties by the Nigerian government, Alaneme created CareerEdu through a Facebook post which generated over 500 messages to his inbox which he redirected to Telegram.
