= Non-consensual condom removal =

Removing a condom without partner's consent

Non-consensual condom removal, or "stealthing", is the practice of a person removing a condom during sexual intercourse without consent, when their sex partner has only consented to condom-protected sex. Purposefully damaging a condom before or during intercourse may also be referred to as stealthing, regardless of who damaged the condom.

Victims are exposed to potential sexually transmitted infections (STIs) such as HIV/AIDS, or unwanted pregnancies. Such behaviour may be therefore regarded as sexual assault, and sometimes as a form of reproductive coercion. As of 2020, stealthing is punishable as a form of sexual violence in some countries, such as Germany and the United Kingdom.

== History and practice ==
In an article published in the Columbia Journal of Gender and Law, Alexandra Brodsky described victims' experiences, legal implications, and legal avenues to address non-consensual condom removal. The term stealthing has been in use in the gay community to describe the criminal transmission of HIV since at least 2014.

Brodsky described how the practice of stealthing is discussed, described, and advocated for on various websites and forums. These forums are sometimes used to brag about committing stealthing and to share tips on how to do it. How-to guides have been posted to social media platforms like Experience Project. The practice has also been described as "a threat to [a victim's] bodily agency and as a dignitary harm", and men who do this "justify their actions as a natural male instinct". Columbia Law School professor Suzanne Goldberg says that the practice of stealthing is likely not new, but its promotion on the internet among men is new. Belgian journalist Heleen Debruyne emphasised in 2017 that the media should not refer to stealthing as a 'new sex trend' as if it were a harmless fad, but make clear that it is a 'form of abuse'.

Teitelman et al. (2011) found that condom negotiation is often silenced by male partners in adolescent relationships, partially due to the woman's fear of her partner's response, a feeling of obligation, and a lack of knowledge or skills in negotiating condom use. To prevent this, it is important that male partners are reached with the information as to why condoms are beneficial for them as well. Forums for this outreach could include community-wide interventions fostering discussion of healthy and unhealthy relationship practices and prevention programs for HIV/AIDS and STIs. Schools can provide a safe site for prevention interventions, but high-risk adolescents who are not in school must be reached through additional means, such as in community centers or detention centers.

Statistics on the prevalence of stealthing are limited. However, a 2014 study by Kelly Cue Davis and colleagues reported that 9.0% of participants in their sample of young men reported having engaged in condom sabotage, which included non-consensual condom removal. The National Sexual Assault Hotline reports receiving calls about stealthing. A recent study from a Melbourne-based sexual health clinic asked women and men who have sex with men (MSM) attending the clinic whether they had experienced non-consensual condom removal, and analysed situational factors associated with the event. 32% of women and 19% of MSM reported having been a victim of non-consensual condom removal. Female victims of non-consensual condom removal were more likely to be a current sex worker and MSM who had experienced non-consensual condom removal were more likely to report anxiety or depression. Both female and male participants who had experienced it were three times less likely to consider it to be sexual assault than participants who had not experienced it. Two other studies were recently published with U.S. samples. One study found that almost 10% of young male non-problem drinkers reported having engaged in nonconsensual condom removal since the age of 14. Men who had engaged in this behavior reported higher rates of STI diagnoses and partners with unplanned pregnancies than men who had not engaged in nonconsensual condom removal. In another study of young adult women, 12% reported that they had experienced nonconsensual condom removal by a male partner, while none of the participants reported engaging in nonconsensual condom removal themselves.

Brianna Chesser and April Zahra (2019) stated in Current Issues in Criminal Justice: "While the majority of complainant accounts indicate that this crime is perpetrated by men, it is also possible for a female to 'stealth' her partner and remove the condom without her partner's consent. It follows that both men and women can both be victims and perpetrators of stealthing." A 2013 article in The Week speculated: "Both men and women can be perpetrators of birth control sabotage. In fact, women have often been stereotyped as purposefully trying to get pregnant against their partner's desires as a way to 'trap' a man. But the issues of reproductive coercion and birth control sabotage have recently gained more attention because of a Canadian case [R v Hutchinson], in which a man poked holes in a pack of condoms so his girlfriend would get pregnant and stay with him."

== Legal issues ==
In her review, Brodsky called for non-consensual condom removal to be legally considered as a kind of sexual assault, but also reviewed the difficulties in doing so: In all legal areas, breaking an agreement usually is not considered a crime, and that misrepresenting one's true intentions does not make a sexual act illegal. Thus, the most successful argument for making non-consensual condom removal punishable would be the inherent pregnancy and infection risk of unprotected intercourse.

== Court verdicts and laws by country ==
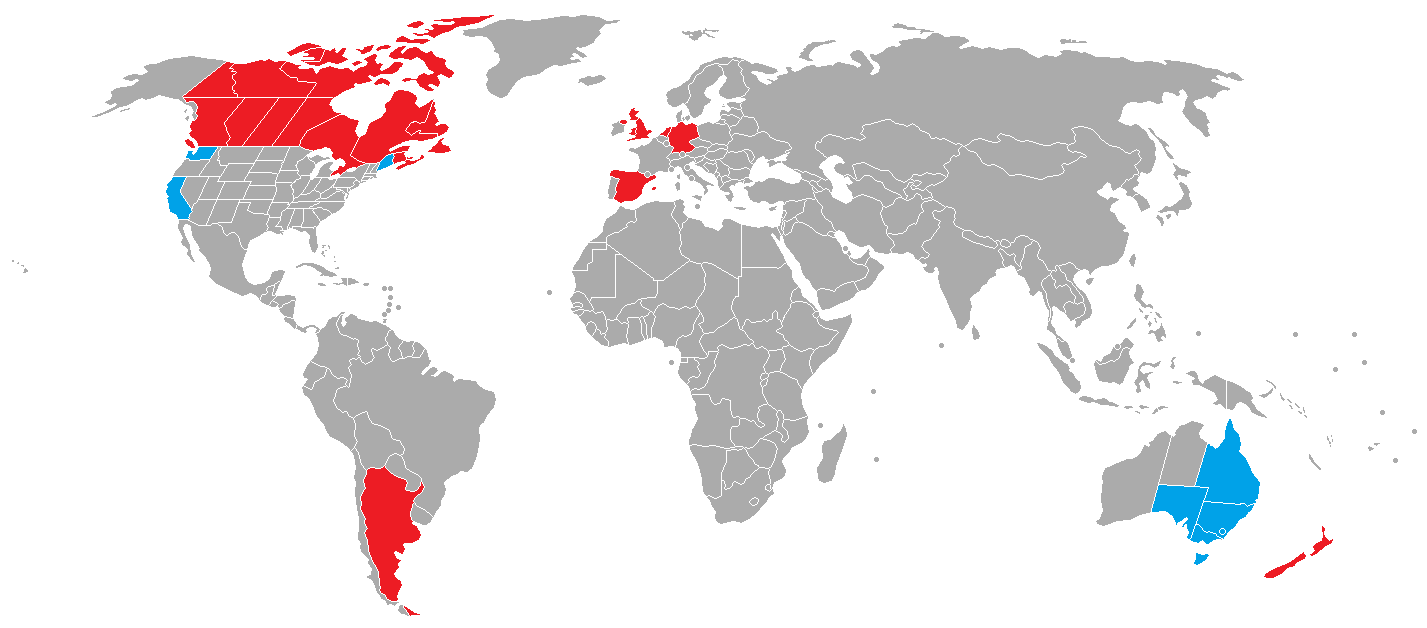
Court decision declaring stealthing as rape or sexual assault Law prohibiting stealthing

=== Argentina ===
In May 2022 a man was convicted of removing his condom during sexual act and continuing despite woman telling him to stop. He fled to Europe, but was arrested in italy in 2025 and extradicted to Argentina.

In May 2024 the Court of Appeals for Buenos Aires ruled that non-consensual condom removal qualifies as sexual assault and indicted a man for the offense.

=== Australia ===
In May 2017, an Australian court case was underway regarding stealthing. The president of the Law Society of New South Wales has described stealthing as sexual assault because it changes the terms of consent.

- Australian Capital Territory: In October 2021, the Australian Capital Territory criminalized stealthing by amending current consent provisions under the territory's Crimes Act to state that a person's consent is negated if it is caused by the intentional misrepresentation by the other person about the use of a condom. This was the result of an April 2020 proposal by assembly member Elizabeth Lee.
- On 6 September 2022, a law received royal assent in state of Victoria outlawing non-consensual condom removal. The law entered into effect in 2023.
- On 6 June 2022, a law went into effect in state of Tasmania outlawing non-consensual condom removal.
- In June 2022, a law went into effect in state of New South Wales outlawing non-consensual condom removal.
- In March 2023, a law banning non-consensual condom removal went into effect in South Australia.
- In March 2024, Queensland passed a law criminalising stealthing.

=== Canada ===
A 2014 Supreme Court of Canada ruling (R v. Hutchinson) upheld a sexual assault conviction of a man who poked holes in his condom. Eight years later, the same court ruled that people who don't wear a condom despite being asked to by a sexual partner may also be convicted of sexual assault.

=== Denmark ===
The crime of stealthing was added to the Danish Penal Code in July 2025, with a penalty of up to two years in prison.

=== Germany ===
In 2018, a man was found guilty of sexual assault in Germany's first conviction for stealthing. In a 2022 German case, a woman was sentenced for sexual assault after she intentionally rendered the condoms defective (through perforation) in order to get pregnant by a man who did not seek a committed, serious relationship.

=== The Netherlands ===
In March 2023, a 28-year-old man in The Netherlands was convicted of coercion for secretly removing his condom despite his victim explicitly stating she would not have intercourse without one. The man could not be convicted for rape, because the law in The Netherlands does not cover penetration without a condom while there was consent for penetration in itself. The man was sentenced to three years of probation and to pay a €1000 fine.

In 2024 a new law was passed which allowed for convictions of sexual assault for non-consensual condom removal with first conviction of three months in jail issued in 2025 to a 40-year old man from Rotterdam.

=== New Zealand ===
In April 2021, a man in New Zealand was convicted of rape for performing stealthing during a consensual act with a sex worker (the event took place in 2018). The man was sentenced to three years and nine months in prison.

=== Spain ===
On 29 May 2024 during an appeal of a man sentenced to four years in prison for non-consensual condom removal the Supreme Court of Spain upheld the sentence declaring the act to be a crime of rape.

=== Switzerland ===
In 2017, a court in Lausanne convicted a man for rape (Note: Swiss law differentiates between Vergewaltigung (rape), sexuelle Nötigung (sexual assault), Schändung (defilement) and others. Foreign journalists usually conflate them with rape, a term with a much wider meaning in US and UK usage.) for removing a condom during sex against the expectations of the woman he was having sex with, but in another case in 2019, the cantonal supreme court of Zürich disagreed. It held that such conduct was not illegal, albeit with regret. In May 2022, the Federal Supreme Court decided that stealthing was not punishable as Schändung (sexual act with a person incapable of proper judgment or resistance, Article 191 of the penal code) because the victim was still capable of defending herself. The incapability to do so is a necessary requirement to punish an act under Article 191. Not knowing about the state of the condom only impinges the decision to initiate defensive action, but does not diminish the victim's ability to defend herself, as the court noted. As the previous instances did not try the two men for sexual harassment (Article 198), the Federal Court did not determine whether stealthing would constitute sexual harassment.

=== United Kingdom ===
In the UK, although no specific legislation has been enacted, there has been multiple convictions for this since 2017 and thus case law has established that non consensual condom removal is rape.

=== United States ===
Outside of California, Maine, and Washington, laws in the United States do not specifically cover stealthing, and as of 2017, there were no known legal cases about it.

- California: In September 2021, the California State Legislature passed a bill sponsored by Assembly member Cristina Garcia which would make it illegal to "[cause] contact between a penis, from which a condom has been removed, and the intimate part of another who did not verbally consent to the condom being removed" during sex. Such an act would then be punishable as "sexual battery". Previously, Garcia introduced similar bills in 2017 and 2018 for the Californian criminal code, but they didn't receive a hearing or died in committee, so Garcia sought to add the provision to the state's civil code this time. In October 2021 Governor Gavin Newsom signed a bill which made the practice a civil offense, which makes it not a crime, but an act that allows victims to sue perpetrators over the act.
- Maine: In June 2023, a law creating civil remedies for victims of non-consensual condom removal was enacted in Maine.
- Washington: In December 2023, the Washington State Legislature passed HB 1958 to make it a civil offense to not only remove or tamper with condoms but also involves other sexually protected devices, making it more inclusive than any other state. The law went into effect on July 1, 2024.

== Impact and risks ==
Removing or damaging a condom during sex increases the risks of unintended pregnancy and the transmission of sexually transmitted infections (STIs). Victims may feel betrayal and many victims see it as a "grave violation of dignity and autonomy". Many may also experience emotional and psychological distress, especially those who have experienced sexual violence in the past.

=== Alcohol ===
A history of sexual aggression and alcohol intoxication are factors associated with an increased risk of men employing non-consensual condom removal and engaging in sexually aggressive behavior with female partners.

== In popular culture ==
The Law and Order SVU Episode Bang is about a wealthy man who secretly pokes holes in his condoms before sleeping with the various women he has sex with and impregnates 43 women as a result.

The phrase "rape-adjacent" appears in Michaela Coel's 2020 television miniseries I May Destroy You, which includes a scene depicting non-consensual condom removal. In episode five, Arabella (played by Coel) publicly describes how Zain (played by Karan Gill) removed a condom during sex without her consent or knowledge and identifies him as rapist under U.K. law: "not rape-adjacent or a bit rapey, he's a rapist under U.K. law." She goes on to distinguish U.K. law from that of the United States and Australia, explaining "if you're in the States, he's rape-adjacent and if you're in Australia, he's a bit rapey."
