= Alliance for Space Development =

Space advocacy organization

- Founded: 2015
- Type: Space advocacy, 501(c)3 Education
- Purpose: Settlement and development of Space
- Location: Washington D.C, United States
- Region served: Worldwide
- Method: Advocating a Citizens' Space Agenda in Washington D.C.
- Members: 15 organizations
- Website: Official website

The Alliance for Space Development is a space advocacy organization dedicated to influencing space policy towards the goal of permanent human settlements in space. The founding executive members of the Alliance are the National Space Society and the Space Frontier Foundation. Member organizations of the Alliance are the Lifeboat Foundation, Mars Foundation, Mars Society, The Moon Society, Space Development Foundation, Space Development Steering Committee, Space For Humanity, Space Renaissance USA, Space Tourism Society, Students for the Exploration and Development of Space, Students on Capitol Hill, Tea Party in Space, and Waypaver Foundation. The primary goals of the Alliance are to elevate the growth of the space industry, reduce the cost of accessing space, and to clearly define space settlement as the reason for sending humans to space.

== Objectives ==
The 2015 objectives of the Alliance are to amend the NASA Space Act to make the development and settlement of space a national purpose, reduce the cost of access to space, complete support for the Commercial Crew Transportation program, and ensuring a gapless transition from the International Space Station to future space stations. The Alliance is also proposing a “Cheap Access to Space Act” to offer $3.5 billion in government prizes for the development of reusable launch vehicles.

== Activities ==
The Alliance participates in the March Storm, a grassroots action to lobby Congress in Washington D.C., and the August Home District Blitz.

== Reception ==
Paul Brower wrote that what was missing from the Alliance's goals is the objective of colonizing the moon. In response, Al Globus, an Alliance board member, wrote that the Alliance is focused on the technological development that must precede a successful space settlement regardless of where that settlement is located.
