= British School of Fashion =

Coordinates: 51°31′6.48″N 0°4′20.18″W

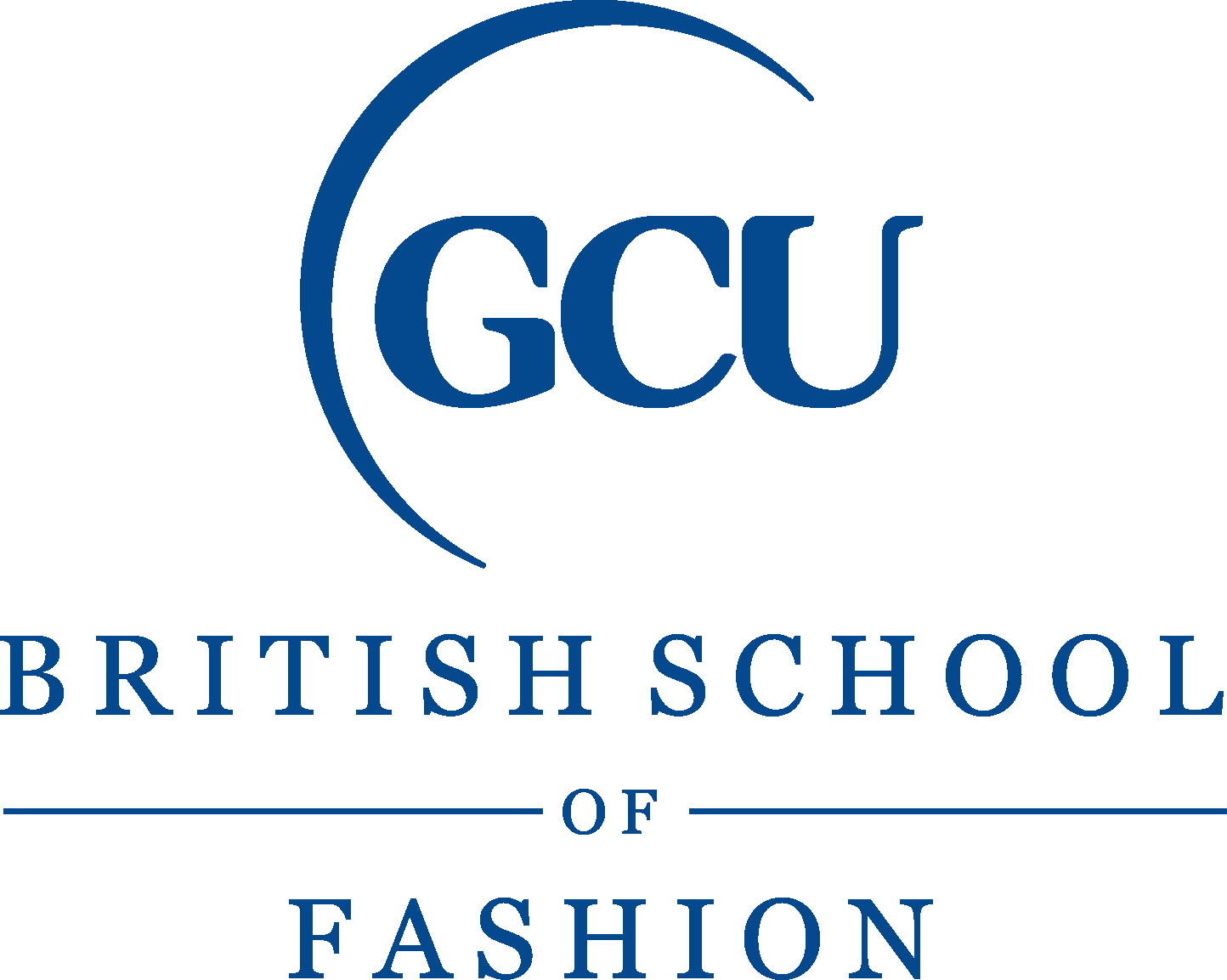
- Established: 2013
- Parent institution: Glasgow Caledonian University
- Location: London
- Campus: GCU London

The British School of Fashion (BSoF) is a postgraduate school of Glasgow Caledonian University based on that university's London campus. It teaches marketing and fashion management.

== History ==
It is based in East London, in the campus of GCULondon, near Spitalfields and opened in 2013, focusing on fashion business and management, not fashion design. Shortly after, plans for a New York branch to open that same month were announced with Muhammad Yunus leading that branch.

== Courses ==
- MBA Luxury Brand Management
- MSc Luxury Brand Marketing
- MSc Fashion Business Creation
- MSc Fashion & Lifestyle Marketing

== Marks and Spencer partnership ==
Since 2013, a Marks and Spencer design studio is installed in the GCU London Campus in collaboration with BSoF.
