= Cue sheet =

A cue sheet may refer to:

- Cue sheet (computing), a text file that details the layout of tracks on a compact disc
- A list of theatrical cues with timing and volume/intensity information
- The Cue Sheet, the quarterly journal of The Film Music Society

== See also ==
- Cue (disambiguation)
