= Kwid =

Kwid or KWID may refer to:

- KWID, a commercial radio station that is licensed to Las Vegas, Nevada
- Mohammad Kwid (born 1956), Syrian football manager and former player
- Renault Kwid, an entry-level crossover produced by the French car manufacturer Renault

== See also ==
- Quid (disambiguation)
