= McCue Center =

Athletic building in Charlottesville, Virginia

Coordinates: 38°2′42.1″N 78°30′27.7″W

The McCue Center, located in Charlottesville, Virginia, is one of the central athletic buildings at the University of Virginia. Named after Dr. Frank C. Mccue III, the building includes an athletic training clinic and weight room used by a variety of the University's athletes and staff. The building also includes the offices, locker rooms, and meeting areas for the Virginia Cavaliers football team. Additionally, the McCue Center holds the offices for the Athletic Director and other administrative staff.

== History ==
The McCue Center is named after Dr. Frank C. McCue III. It was dedicated on September 14, 1991. The building costs over 10 million dollars and is used not only to house many University offices but also to attract visiting recruits. A restoration of much of the center was completed in the summer of 2007 in order to upgrade the aesthetic features of the building as well as incorporate improved technology into its facilities.

== Dr. Frank McCue ==
Dr. Frank C. McCue III was a doctor and medical assistant for the University of Virginia athletic program from 1961 to 2003. McCue received his undergraduate degree, medical degree, and completed his residency at the University. During his tenure he treated a variety of Cavalier athletes and other athletes and patients from the Charlottesville area. McCue retired in 2003 and was named Professor Emeritus of Orthopaedics at the University of Virginia's hospital. He later became the first inductee to the Order of the Crossed Sabres, which is noted as the Virginia Football Alumni Club's highest honor. His presence in sports medicine continues as the Virginia High School Coaches Association annually gives a sports medicine award in his honor. In 1998, the McCue Society was created and provides a variety of scholarships in the field of Sports Medicine to both graduates and undergraduates. The McCue Society, made up of McCue's former colleagues, fellows, athletic trainers and students and friends, also provides a forum for sports medicine education and research among other contributions to the field of study.

== Locker Room ==
The McCue Center holds the primary practice locker room for the Virginia Cavaliers football team. Fully refurbished in the summer of 2007, the locker room is designed as a place of preparation for the team's practices as well as an area for building team community. The locker room includes a variety of video game systems and an internet lounge. There are ten flat-screen high-definition televisions to display team information and five more in the player lounge area for entertainment.

== Athletic Training Clinic ==
The Athletic Training Clinic is located on the first floor of the McCue Center. It is a 7,000 square feet (650 m^{2}) area and divided into regions for rehabilitation, taping, patient evaluation, and hydrotherapy. The hydrotherapy area includes an 8' x 8' deep water running pool, a 10' x 40' multilevel ambulation pool and an octagonal whirlpool with an adjacent cold tank. The Clinic also includes a room in which minor surgery can be performed, a conference room, and multiple offices for staff Athletic Trainers, Graduate Assistants, and Student Athletic Trainers.

== Football Practice Fields ==
Located directly behind the McCue Center are three practice fields. One of the fields is natural grass while the other two are FieldTurf. The FieldTurf playing surface was installed in the summer of 2006. FieldTurf is now used by many different college football programs and National Football League teams.

== Weight Room ==
The McCue Center features an 8,000-square-foot (740 m^{2}) weight room designed to enable the athletes of the University to improve their speed, strength, flexibility, and overall explosiveness. The weight room area is equipped with a large number and wide array of free weights and plate-loaded machines. The office of the University of Virginia's strength and conditioning coach Brandon Hourigan is located within the room. A variety of other staff members and assistants work in the strength program in order to assist athletes in achieving their fitness goals.

== Orthopaedic Sports Medicine Center ==
The McCue center also now holds the Orthopaedic Sports Medicine Center for the University. The center treats recreational, high school, collegiate, and professional athletes. The center not only deals with treating injuries but also works to ensure the safe preparation and solutions for a variety of sports related medical issues.

== Football Administrative Offices ==
The Center includes a variety of offices and meeting areas for the University's football program. The McCue Center holds the offices for all of the coaching staff. These offices are used when compiling weekly gameplans and talking to visiting recruits. The programs recruiting assistants and administrative support staff also call the McCue center home. Both departments use student workers to assist in a variety of tasks to strengthen and build the program as a whole.

== Remembering UVA Players ==
The McCue center has a wide array of images and technology devoted to display the achievements and notable players throughout the history of Virginia Cavaliers football. The second floor features a large trophy case which holds memorabilia from important regular season and bowl games. Also included are framed pictures and informative touchstone monitors that support the Hoos’ in the National Football League program. This program uses both preserved materials in the McCue Center and video features during games to display the achievements and presence of former football players in the National Football League.
