= Glasgow Caledonian University =

Public university in Glasgow, Scotland

Coordinates: 55.86722°N 4.25016°W

- Motto: For the Common Weal
- Type: Public university
- Established: 1993; From: • Glasgow Polytechnic (1971) • Queens College (1875)
- Academic affiliations: EUA, ACU, Universities UK, Universities Scotland, Florence Network, Talloires Network
- Endowment: £0.43 million (2020)
- Chancellor: Anne-Marie Imafidon
- Principal & Vice-Chancellor: Mairi Watson
- Administrative staff: 1,600
- Students: 22,205 (2024/25)
- Undergraduates: 15,525 (2024/25)
- Postgraduates: 6,680 (2024/25)
- Location: Glasgow, Scotland
- Website: gcu.ac.uk
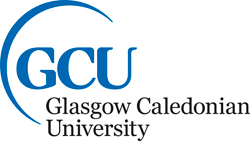

Glasgow Caledonian University (abbreviated GCU; Scottish Gaelic: Oilthigh Chailleannach Ghlaschu), is a public university in Glasgow, Scotland. It was formed in 1993 by the merger of The Queen's College, Glasgow (founded in 1875) and Glasgow Polytechnic (originally Glasgow College of Technology (GCT), founded in 1971).

It is located in the Cowcaddens district, just to the immediate north of the city centre, and is one of three universities in Glasgow alongside the University of Glasgow and the University of Strathclyde.

== History ==
The university traces its origin from The Queen's College, Glasgow (founded 1875), and the Glasgow College of Technology (founded 1971). The Queen's College, which specialised in providing training in domestic science, received the royal accolade of being named after Queen Elizabeth II in its centenary celebrations in 1975. Queen Elizabeth was, herself, patron of the college since 1944. Glasgow College of Technology (which changed its name to Glasgow Polytechnic in 1991), which was one of the largest central institutions in Scotland, offered externally validated degrees and diplomas in engineering, science, and the humanities: the first of which was a BA in Optics, followed by degrees in Social Sciences (1973) and Nursing (1977).

On 1 April 1993, the two institutions amalgamated to form Glasgow Caledonian University. The new university took its name from Caledonia, the poetic Latin name for present-day Scotland. The main campus of the university is built on the site of the former Buchanan Street Station, built by the Caledonian Railway.

Independent research carried out in 2015 revealed that the university contributes over £480M to Scotland's economy each year with the quantifiable lifetime premium of a one-year class of graduates estimated at £400M, bringing the university's total annual economic impact to around £880M in Scotland alone.

In July 2018, Annie Lennox was installed as GCU's first female chancellor, taking over the role from Nobel Peace Prize laureate Muhammad Yunus. She was succeeded by entrepreneur and computer scientist Anne-Marie Imafidon in February 2024. Mairi Watson is the principal and vice-chancellor of the university, appointed in 2026.

=== Coat of arms and motto ===
The university's coat of arms is the work of university academic and artist Malcolm Lochhead and draws on four elements from the coat of arms of the university's predecessor institutions. The oak tree (of St. Mungo's legend) and the Book of Knowledge were borrowed from the arms of Glasgow Polytechnic while the saltire ermine and the crossed keys (intended to represent the "unlocking" of the Book of Knowledge) were taken from the arms of The Queen's College. A visual feature was added to the new arms with the illuminated capital letters in the Book's paragraphs reading: G C U (the three-letter abbreviation of the university's name). The coat of arms was matriculated by the Lord Lyon King of Arms and is inscribed into university degree parchments. The university's motto: "for the common weal", which has been adopted since 1975, features in the full design of the arms.

== Campuses ==
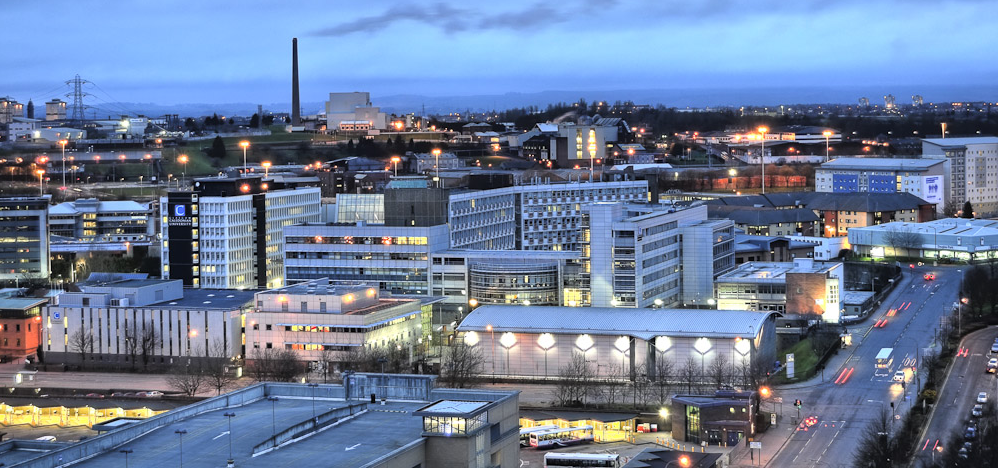
The university's Glasgow campus at dusk

GCU's main campus is located in the Cowcaddens area of the city, with most of the buildings dating back to the early 1970s and the construction of the Glasgow College of Technology over the former site of Buchanan Street railway station. GCU also operated out of Queens College' former campus in the Woodlands area of the city on Park Drive, but this was sold to the University of Glasgow in 2001 and everything consolidated on the Cowcaddens site.

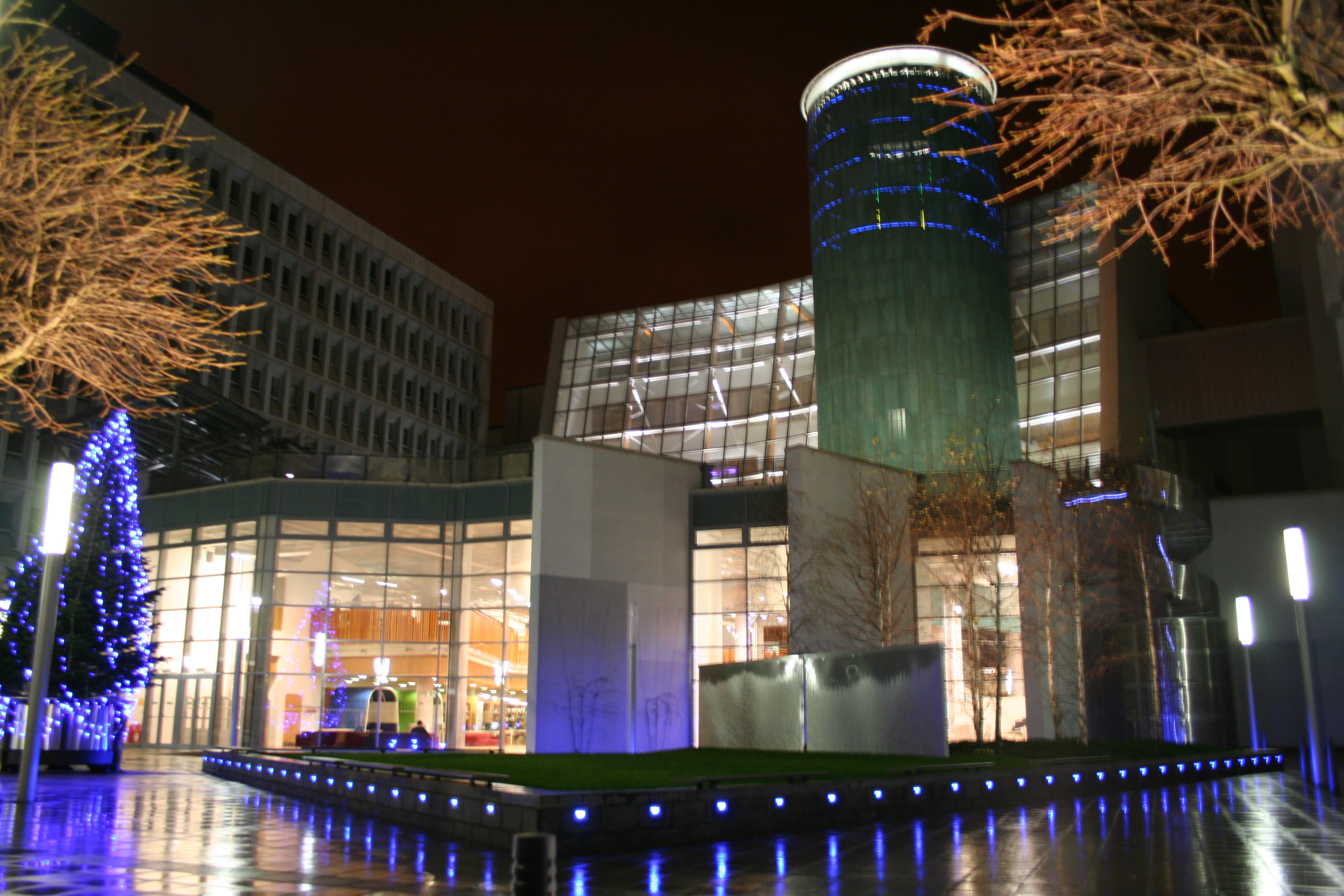
The Saltire Centre

GCU London is the second campus, specialising in Insurance, Banking and Finance, Risk Management, International Fashion Marketing, Luxury Brand Marketing, Public Health and Construction Management. It is home to the British School of Fashion. Based in Fashion Street, Spitalfields, the centre offers a range of MBA and MSc courses. GCU London opened in September 2010 and it is reportedly the first Scottish university to open a base in London. GCU London offers the UK's first MBA in Luxury Brand Marketing.

== Organisation and administration ==
=== Academic schools ===
==== Science and Engineering ====
The School of Science and Engineering houses Glasgow Caledonian University's teaching and research in computing, engineering, and the built environment. The school was previously known as the School of Computing, Engineering and Built Environment before adopting its current name ahead of the 2025–26 academic year as part of an institutional restructuring.

The school is composed of the following three departments

- Department of Engineering
- Department of Computer Science
- Department of Construction and Built Environment

The school delivers undergraduate and postgraduate programmes and undertakes research in areas related to technological innovation, sustainable environments, and the built environment. The research centre associated with the school is the Centre for Research into Innovative and Sustainable Environments (RISE).

==== Glasgow School for Business and Society ====
Glasgow School for Business and Society brings together disciplines in business, law, economics, social sciences, fashion, tourism, risk management, finance, media and journalism. The School is also home to the Moffat Centre for Travel and Tourism Development and the Yunus Centre for Social Business and Health and is composed of the following departments:

- Department of Economics & Law
- Department of Finance, Accountancy & Risk
- Department of Management
- Department of People & Organisations
- Department of Creative Industries

==== Health and Life Sciences ====
The School of Health and Life Sciences is one of Scotland's largest research and teaching centres in health care and life sciences; Scotland's only provider of optometry training; and home to an eye clinic, based on campus. GCU is ranked in the Top 20 in the UK for allied health research at world-leading and internationally excellent standards. The school is, since 1993, Scotland's only designated World Health Organization Collaborating Centre (WHOCC) for Nursing and Midwifery Education, Research, and Practice. It is also home to the Scottish Ambulance Academy; the only educational establishment in the UK to be formally endorsed by the College of Paramedics and certified by the Health and Care Professions Council, providing professional training for paramedics on behalf of the Scottish Ambulance Service. September 2017 saw the first intake of the BSc Paramedic Science course, the first direct-entry undergraduate paramedic course available in Scotland. The school is composed of the following eight departments:

- Department of Biological and Biomedical Sciences
- Department of Nursing and Community Health
- Department of Occupational Therapy & Human Nutrition & Dietetics
- Department of Physiotherapy and Paramedicine
- Department of Podiatry and Radiography
- Department of Psychology
- Department of Social Work
- Department of Vision Sciences

=== Administration ===
By statute, the university maintains two internal institutions: the University Court and the University Senate. The University Court is the supreme governing body of the university and is composed of a number of 'governors', statutory mandated with overseeing its overall strategic direction and appointing both the chancellor and the principal (and vice-chancellor) of the university. The university's principal and vice-chancellor and the president of the Students' Association are ex officio governors of the Court. The University Senate, on the other hand, is statutory tasked with the overall planning, co-ordination, development and supervision of the university's academic affairs. University degrees and fellowship as well as academic honours and distinctions are awarded by and in the name of the Court, with the advice of the Senate. The current chair of the Court is Yvette Cooper and the Senate is presided over by the university's principal and vice-chancellor, currently Professor Mairi Watson

== Academic profile ==
GCU offers academic programmes in all of the Scottish Funding Council funding groups but medicine, dentistry and teacher education. The 2008 Research Assessment Exercise gave the university an 'internationally recognised' research profile in a multitude of disciplines. Over 70% of the university's research submissions were judged as being internationally recognised and 30% were deemed world-leading or of international excellence. In 2015, the QAA awarded the university its highest judgement for academic standards, whilst praising the university's innovative academic approaches. In 2013, GCU was awarded the HR Excellence in Research Award by the European Commission, in recognition of its commitment to the development of researchers. This has been retained in 2015 following its two-year review.

=== Research ===
According to the latest Research Excellence Framework (REF2021), 72% of its research activity was rated as world leading (4*) or internationally excellent (3*).

The University has established a research architecture, centred around three Centres of Research Excellence, the Research Centre for Health (ReaCH); Yunus Centre for Social Business and Health, and the newly established Centre for Research into Innovative and Sustainable Environments (RISE).

This follows a strategic shift to concentrate resources on high-quality research aligned with GCU's areas of research excellence, within a more sustainable configuration, and supported by the University's new Research and Knowledge Exchange Service (RKES).

Each centre brings together researchers and external partners to address societal challenges structured around the University's three major themes of Healthy Lives, Inclusive Societies and Sustainable Environments. The centres work on an interdisciplinary basis aiming for policy engagement, cross-institute collaboration and real-world impact.

The RISE conducts interdisciplinary research and industry collaboration within the school, focusing on sustainable engineering, climate resilience, and environmental techology.

The Yunus Centre for Social Business and Health, established in 2010 and led by Director and Yunus Chair Professor Rachel Baker, is integrated into the Glasgow School for Business and Society. With its collaborations, international reputation, methodological innovation and inter‑disciplinary approach, this integration will strengthen connections and create research in social economy, social justice and inequalities, economics of health and wellbeing, and community, citizenship and participation.

ReaCH sits in the School of Health and Life Sciences translating evidence-based applied health research into action – to improve health and wellbeing. Professor Gordon Ramage has been appointed the Director of the centre and is leading a phase of development, focused on enhancing interdisciplinary collaboration.

=== Rankings ===
Rankings
National rankings
- Complete (2027): 89
- Guardian (2027): 112
- Times / Sunday Times (2027): 43

Global rankings
- QS (2027): 1001–1200
- THE (2026): 801–1000

Glasgow Caledonian University (GCU) is ranked in the top 50 UK universities according to the Times and Sunday Times Good University Guide and is the top ranked Scottish modern university in the Daily Mail University Guide.

According to the Higher Education Statistics Agency (HESA) UK Performance Indicators in Higher Education, 90% of GCU graduates are in work or further study six months after graduation with 76% of graduates in highly skilled occupations.

The Times Higher Education 2018 UK Student Experience survey named GCU as the second most improved university in the UK for student experience, up from 99th to joint 67th.

It is a member of the University Alliance, Association of Commonwealth Universities, the European University Association, Universities UK, Universities Scotland, the Florence Network, the Talloires Network, the Erasmus+ Programme, and the Santander Universities Network.

=== Widening access ===
The Widening Participation and Outreach department works with partner primary and secondary schools, colleges in Glasgow and the surrounding area, and prospective and current students. Its activities include outreach, support for articulation and transition to higher education, and support for students who are care-experienced or estranged. In addition to its permanent staff, the department employs student mentors from Glasgow Caledonian University who work across its teams.

The Caledonian Club is Glasgow Caledonian’s multi-award-winning, widening participation and community engagement initiative. It works with Glasgow communities to tackle below-average progression rates into higher education, challenge perceived barriers to progression and provide positive and rewarding experiences within a higher education setting.

== Global Networks ==
=== Oman ===
The university has been working with the Caledonian College of Engineering (now the National University of Science and Technology, Oman) since 1996 and offers its largest programme of transnational education there to undergraduate and postgraduate students.

=== South Africa ===
The university has a history of interaction with South Africa and a number of its leading figures. It was the first university to award Nelson Mandela an honorary doctorate upon his release from prison in 1990 in recognition of his leadership during the anti-apartheid movement. In accepting the honour, Mandela asked the university to offer support for reconstruction and development in South Africa and the university developed in this regard several projects to assist in research and training at a number of South African universities. Mandela officially received the honorary degree in June 1996 at a special ceremony in Buckingham Palace, and suggested the renaming of the university's Health Building after his close associate, Govan Mbeki, who was imprisoned in the cell next to him on Robben Island. The Govan Mbeki Building was officially inaugurated by Mbeki's son, President Thabo Mbeki, in June 2001 and a specially-commissioned portrait of Nelson Mandela was unveiled that year at the Building's foyer by Mandela's wife, Graça Machel. The university is also home to two significant scholarly collections on South Africa: the Anti-Apartheid Movement in Scotland Archive and the George Johannes Collection. In 2012, GCU began designing and developing work-based programmes in railway operations management for Transnet Freight Rail, South Africa's largest freight rail organisation. This work concluded in 2025.

=== Arctic Research ===
The university is an active member of the University of the Arctic. UArctic is an international cooperative network based in the Circumpolar Arctic region, consisting of more than 200 universities, colleges, and other organizations with an interest in promoting education and research in the Arctic region.

=== Cultural Fellows ===
The Caledonian Cultural Fellows Initiative was set up in 2009 with the aim of enhancing university cultural life and promoting cultural engagement with wider community. Liz Lochhead, the Scots Makar, is the current honorary president of the fellowship, whose membership includes writer Anne Donovan, poet and novelist Jackie Kay, and artist Toby Paterson.

=== New York branch and transfer to IE ===
In June 2017, the university's New York partner institution, which was founded in 2013, was granted permission to award degrees in the state, the first higher education institution founded by a foreign university to achieve this status. Its campus was located on Wooster Street campus in New York City's SoHo neighbourhood.

In June 2023, GCU noted that they planned to sell their New York campus as it had not lived up to its potential. On 31 July 2024, it was announced that IE University had acquired Glasgow Caledonian New York College and would be renaming it IE New York College.

== Student life ==
=== Students' Association ===
Glasgow Caledonian University Students' Association (GCUSA) is the students' association of Glasgow Caledonian University. It represents and enables Glasgow Caledonian University students to enhance all aspects of their student experience. It is located in the Students' Association Building on the Glasgow Campus and has an office at GCU London. All Glasgow Caledonian University students are automatically admitted to its membership upon matriculation.

The Students' Association runs sports clubs and societies such as, student magazine The EDIT, student radio station Radio Caley, active lifestyles programme and an events programme. At a national level the Students' Association is affiliated to the National Union of Students (NUS) which lobbies and campaigns for students at a Scottish and UK level.

=== Graduation ===
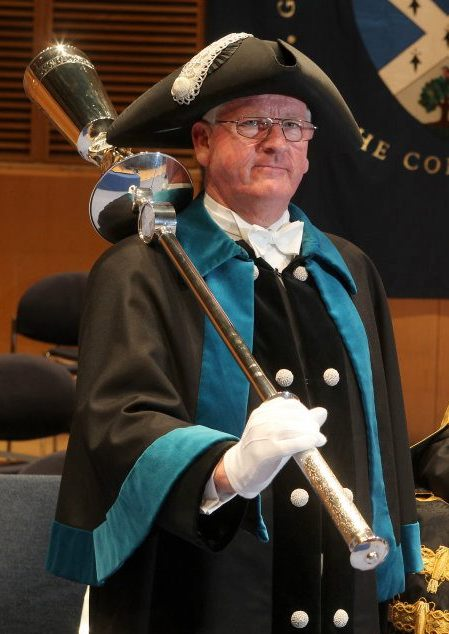
Bedellus carrying the university's ceremonial mace

GCU holds its annual graduation ceremonies during the summer and autumn and its academic attire is made by robe-maker Ede & Ravenscroft. Under the university's academic dress code, the wearing of the customary mortar boards is disallowed, as it is not part of the official academic attire that consists of gowns and hoods only, individual to each award conferred. Graduates traditionally receive their degrees at graduation ceremonies by being "capped" on the head with the Chancellor's hat, in a gesture that signifies the Chancellor's authority and status within the university. The postnominals for university graduates are prescribed with the abbreviation GlasCal.

== Notable staff and alumni ==
- Qanta Ahmed, British-American physician specializing in sleep disorders, and author, women's rights activist, journalist, and public commentator
- Gordon Brown, former British Prime Minister, Lecturer in Politics (1976–1980)
- Jeane Freeman, retired Scottish National Party, MSP and businesswoman
- Hans Broekhuizen, Dutch civil servant and politician (CDA), Mayor of Twenterand
- Elizabeth Ya Eli Harding, Gambian diplomat
- Lesley Laird, Scottish Labour Party, MP
- Michael Keating, Chair in Scottish Politics, University of Aberdeen
- Andy Kerr, Scottish Labour Party politician, former Member of Parliament
- Rhona Martin, curling gold medallist in the 2002 Winter Olympic Games
- Gordon MacDonald, Scottish National Party MSP for Edinburgh Pentlands
- Drew McIntyre, professional wrestler
- Siobhan McMahon, Scottish Labour Party MSP
- Lesley McMillan, FRSE researcher in gender based violence and criminal justice
- Pat Nevin, retired footballer
- Eunice Olumide, model
- Sikandar Raza, cricketer, Zimbabwe Cricket
- Hassan Rouhani, former President of Iran
- Anna Sloan, curling bronze medallist at the 2014 Winter Olympics
- Gregor Virant, Minister of the Interior and Public Administration of Slovenia
- Sean Michael Wilson, comic book writer
- Muhammad Yunus, Bangladeshi economist and civil society leader. He was awarded the Nobel Peace Prize in 2006 for founding the Grameen Bank and pioneering the concepts of microcredit and microfinance.

== See also ==
- Armorial of UK universities
- List of universities in the United Kingdom
- Universities in Scotland
