= Commercially useful enzymes =

Commercially useful enzymes (CUEs) are enzymes with applications in various industries. Microbial enzymes are widely utilized as biocatalysts in fields such as biotechnology, agriculture, and pharmaceuticals. Metagenomic data serve as a valuable resource for identifying novel CUEs from previously unknown microbes present in complex microbial communities across diverse ecosystems.

== Classification ==
A curated set of 510 CUEs was developed using publicly available information and categorized into nine broad application areas based on their functional roles. Through homology-based analysis of ten publicly available metagenomic datasets, several novel CUEs with homology to the curated set were discovered.

This approach led to the creation of the Metagenomic BioMining Engine (MetaBioME), a platform designed for the computational identification of homologs of known CUEs from metagenomic data. MetaBioME provides a resource for uncovering novel homologs of existing CUEs and identifying previously unknown enzymes, which can serve as leads for experimental validation. The platform is accessible online at MetaBioME.
