= Lesley McMillan =

Scottish criminologist

Lesley McMillan FRSE
- Occupation(s): professor of Criminology and Sociology
- Employer: Glasgow Caledonian University
- Known for: research on gender based violence influencing changes in police practice for rape or domestic violence survivors

Lesley McMillan, FRSE, professor of Criminology and Sociology at Glasgow Caledonian University (GCU), associate director of the Scottish Institute for Policing Research, and associate director of the Centre for Research in Families and Relationships based at the University of Edinburgh, researches gender-based violence and criminal justice systems. She influenced reforms in police training for best practice when dealing with traumatised rape or sexual violence survivors, and was behind a multimedia campaign "Erase the Grey" which challenges traditional views on gender-based violence.

== Career and research ==
McMillan became a member of the Young Academy, and is registered by the British Association for Counselling and Psychotherapy (BACP), as a counsellor, volunteering for the NHS.

Her work specialises in gendered and sexual violence and criminal justice, especially initial policing but also covering the whole system's responses to survivors, and also wider related areas like sexual victimising of university students. She is an associate director of the Scottish Institute for Policing Research, and leads its Public Protection Network, and is also an associate director of multiple partner Centre for Research on Families and Relationships, based at the University of Edinburgh. McMillan supervises Ph.Ds across a range of research such as 'policing rape; stalking; criminal justice policy.. on violence;.. initiatives on youth crime; legal defences to women who kill violent partners; rape as a war crime'.

McMillan also heads up the GCU Masters Programme in Research (Strategy) in the Graduate School.

McMillan has joined in public debate on what constitutes rape, and as she studied 408 case histories, exploring why so many rape cases are dropped. The study noted that 90% of attacks were by people the women knew, or were in a sexual relationship with, and those were more likely to be dropped, of her sample only 10% went all the way to trial. She also commented on the anti-rape devices and apps, which she viewed as endorsing the misconception of 'stranger danger' and that rapists are mainly 'jumping out at night.' In 2019, she extended her work with students and Police Scotland to a social media campaign, 'Erase the Grey' as a way of offering help to reduce the average of nine people a year murdered in domestic abuse, and a 'hard-hitting' approach to sexual risks on campus to help guide students and link to sources of support and help locally.

Following the murder of Sarah Everard by a member of the Metropolitan Police (the Met), McMillan's work was quoted by another rape survivor, who was planning to write a book on her own experiences, quoting the findings that police believed women were lying about their rape or sexual assaults between 5% and 95% of the time, but her analysis had shown that no more than 3–4% of such claims could have been 'fabricated'.

GCU Principal & Vice-Chancellor Pamela Gillies welcomed McMillan's election as a Fellow of the Royal Society of Edinburgh, saying "Her research expertise in the area of sexual violence has garnered international acclaim and has influenced professional practice by police, governmental agencies and the third sector." McMillan was nominated by the university as their candidate for the 2021 AdvanceHE National Teaching Excellence Award.

== Research publications ==
McMillan's research and selected publications are on-line, and listed in Google Scholar, and JSTOR.

Books include her 2007 comparative account "Feminists organising against gendered violence" publisher Palgrave Macmillan, for example refuges provided by Northern Ireland's women's liberation movement. In 2012, a further study of Diversity, Standardization and Social Transformation: Gender, Ethnicity and Inequality in Europe publisher Taylor & Francis, looked at the interactions between national, European and regional regulatory aspects. She also co-edited in 2012 a theory and practice compendium "Violence against women."
