= Quasi Universal Intergalactic Denomination =

Proposed space currency by Travelex

Units of account
- Nickname: Quid

Demographics
- User(s): None

The Quasi Universal Intergalactic Denomination (QUID) is a proposed "space currency" created as a viral marketing campaign launched by Travelex with the London-based public relations and advertising firm, talkPR. The full name is a backronym from 'quid', a slang term for the British pound. The campaign stated that Travelex was launching a new form of money for space tourists that had no sharp edges, was chemically inert, and had other advantages over paper money.

== The QUID ==
After coming up with the idea of a space-money campaign, talkPR and Travelex contacted the National Space Centre, whose employees were presented with a number of mockups made by the campaign artists and were asked to select one.

The end result was a series of circular clear discs with colored centers, symbolizing the eight planets of the Solar System inside, and denominations ranging from 1 to 10. Each quid coin would have its own unique code number, similar to the serial number on paper currency, to allow tracking, and to prevent counterfeiting. Travelex stated it planned to work with the Bank of England to begin registering the QUID as possible legal currency in the future.

On October 5, 2007, a one-page press statement announcing the QUID was released and placed on the United Press International press release newswire. The campaign was launched in the midst of intense press coverage of the Virgin Galactic news. The story was picked up by major news agencies in the UK, and soon after, the US. Science magazines and technological blog writers weighed in on the topic, calling it "useless" and "nonsense", further spreading the story.

Statements by members of the NSC and the University of Leicester (who started the NSC) were added to the campaign release. When the campaign concluded, NSC received the resulting coins and put them on display in their Space|Now display.

== See also ==
- Space Adventures
- Space colonization
- Commercial astronaut
- Space Tourism Society
- List of private spaceflight companies
