= Queue =

Queue (/kjuː/; French pronunciation: [kø]) may refer to:

== Crowd control ==
- Queue area, or queue, a line or area where people wait for goods or services
  - Queue for the lying-in-state of Elizabeth II, contemporarily referred to as "The Queue"

== Arts, entertainment, and media ==
- ACM Queue, a computer magazine
- The Queue (Sorokin novel), a 1983 novel by Russian author Vladimir Sorokin
- The Queue (Abdel Aziz novel), a 2013 novel by Egyptian author Basma Abdel Aziz
- "The Queue" (Gunsmoke), a 1955 television episode

== Mathematics and technology ==
- Queue (abstract data type), a type of data structure in computer science
  - Circular queue
  - Double-ended queue, also known as a deque
  - Priority queue
- FIFO (computing and electronics)
- Load (computing) or queue, system load of a computer's operating system
- Message queue
- Queueing theory, the study of wait lines

== Other uses ==
- Queue (hairstyle), a Qing dynasty Manchu hairstyle

== See also ==
- Cue (disambiguation)
- FIFO (disambiguation)
- First-come, first-served
- Q (disambiguation)
- Q, the letter
- Que (disambiguation)
