= Florence Network =

The Florence Network
- Named after: Florence Nightingale
- President: Susan Schärli-Lim, Zurich University of Applied Sciences (ZHAW), Winterthur
- Vice-President: Jana Nemcova, Comenius University, Bratislava
- Website: https://sites.google.com/site/theflorencenetworkeu/home

The Florence Network is a cross-nation European co-operation of nursing and midwifery departments from 18 countries. It includes a total of 38 institutions across Europe. It focuses on international cooperation over educational and scientific issues, with the aim to develop and increase the quality of higher education in nursing, midwifery and health care. In this way the organization works to improve the image of the profession and to raise the profile of nursing and midwifery within Europe.

== Primary goals ==
The Florence Network's stated goals are principally concerned with European nursing and midwifery. They include organising student and lecturer exchange between network members, improving curriculum quality and facilitating research collaboration.

It is hoped that the network will help with identified issues in nursing, such as an aging workforce, nursing shortages in higher-income EU countries, workplace dissatisfaction in lower-income countries, and a need for more culturally sensitive healthcare.

== Member Countries ==
Institutions join the network by invitation only, but do not pay membership fees. As of 2019, forty higher education institutions (HEIs) from the following European nations are members of the network:

- Belgium
- Czech Republic
- Denmark
- England
- Finland
- Germany
- Greece
- Italy
- Latvia
- Netherlands
- Norway
- Portugal
- Scotland
- Slovakia
- Slovenia
- Spain
- Sweden
- Switzerland
- Turkey

== Annual meeting ==
Every year one of the partners - institutions of higher education (Universities of applied Sciences) is the host institution for the annual meeting.

- 1995 Start of Florence Network - Groningen - Netherlands
- 1996 Copenhagen, Oslo,
- 1997 Stockholm, Aalst, Belgium
- 1998 Bremen, Germany
- 1999 Rovaniemi, Finland
- 2000 Prague, Czech Republic
- 2001 Lahti, Finland
- 2002 Edinburgh, Scotland
- 2003 Porsgrunn, Norway
- 2004 Udine, Italy
- 2005 Leuven, Belgium
- 2006 Napier University, Edinburgh, Scotland
- 2007 Halmstad University, Varberg, Sweden
- 2008 Masaryk University, Brno, Czech Republic
- 2009 The Hague University, The Hague, Netherlands
- 2010 Ege University, Izmir, Turkey
- 2011 ESEL, Lisbon, Portugal
- 2012 Malmö University, Sweden
- 2013 Hanzehogeschool, Groningen / NHL, Leeuwarden, Netherlands
- 2014 TurgutOzal University, Ankara, Turkey
- 2015 Metropolitan University College, Copenhagen /University College Zealand, Roskilde, Denmark
- 2016 University of Verona & Trento Campus, Italy
- 2017 Bern UAS, Zurich UAS & St. Gallen UAS, Bern & Winterthur, Switzerland
- 2018 Odisee, Belgium
- 2019 Coventry, England
