= Kelly Cue Davis =

Researcher

- Occupations: Assistant dean and professor at Arizona State University

Academic background
- Education: Trinity University (BA); University of Washington (MS); University of Washington (PhD)

Academic work
- Discipline: Clinical psychology
- Sub-discipline: Sexual violence

Kelly Cue Davis is an assistant dean, professor, and research faculty member at Arizona State University in the Edson College of Nursing and Health Innovation, best known for her work in "the role of alcohol in sexual assault perpetration and victimization."

== Education ==
Davis attended Trinity University and received a B.A. in psychology in 1992. During her undergraduate studies, Davis volunteered at a rape crisis center as a rape prevention educator. Through this experience, Davis became interested in studying alcohol's involvement in sexual assault, ultimately resulting in the topic being her research focus in graduate school.

She earned her M.S. in clinical psychology from the University of Washington in 1995, and obtained her Ph.D. in clinical psychology in 1999 from the University of Washington. Her doctoral advisor was Dr. William H. George, and her thesis was titled "Women's Perceptions of and Responses to Sexual Aggression: The Alcohol Myopia and Anxiolysis-Disinhibition Theories." She completed her doctoral clinical internship at the Veterans Affairs Medical Center in Portland, Oregon.

== Career ==
Davis first began working in academia at the University of Washington, holding several positions in their Psychology Department and School of Social Work.

Davis is currently the assistant dean for Tenured, Tenure-Track, and Research Track Faculty Affairs at Arizona State University. She is also a professor and research faculty in Arizona State University's Edson College of Nursing and Health Innovation, and is involved with their Center for Health Promotion and Disease Prevention and their Institute for Social Science Research, in which she is an affiliated faculty member.

Davis is also a licensed clinical psychologist in the state of Arizona and was previously licensed in the state of Washington. As of 2018, Davis is listed in the National Register of Health Service Psychologists.

== Research ==
Davis' research centers on risky health behaviors, emphasizing "the intersection of sexual violence, sexual risk, and substance use." Specifically, she assesses "sexual assault assessment, response, prevention, and policy in both K-12 and higher education institutions as well the military and legal system." Davis currently runs the Alcohol & Sexual Health Lab in Arizona State University's Edson College of Nursing and Health Innovation.

Davis has published research regarding how bartenders can be better prepared for handling situations where they may need to intervene. Her publication titled "Safer Bars: A cluster-randomized effectiveness evaluation of alcohol-related sexual violence prevention through bar staff bystander training" aimed to assess Safer Bars, a program that trains bartenders on the warning signs of sexual assault perpetration. Davis and colleagues found that Safer Bars was an effective program for educating bartenders.

In her more than 20 years in research, Davis has received over $40 million in grant funding from the National Institutes of Health and has over 150 peer-reviewed journal articles. In addition to this, her research has been specifically funded by the National Institute on Alcohol Abuse and Alcoholism, the National Institute on Drug Abuse, the U.S. Army Medical Research Acquisition Activity, the Alcoholic Beverage Medical Research Foundation, and the National Institute of Allergy and Infectious Diseases. Davis has also received two grants from Arizona State University, including the Institute for Social Science Research Seed Grant and the Glen J. Swette Seed Grant.

=== Applications to law ===
Davis has been cited regarding recent state laws regarding "stealthing" (non-consensual condom removal). Her research titled "Young Women’s Experiences with Coercive and Non-Coercive Condom Use Resistance: Examination of an Understudied Sexual Risk Behavior" found that the majority of women have experienced some form of condom-use resistance. This finding has helped the public become more aware of non-consensual condom removal as a form of sexual assault, with Davis stating "as people read about ['stealthing'] more and more in the media, people said 'that happened to me, that happened to me, I never knew what to call it'". Several state legislatures have recently moved towards laws regarding stealthing because of experts' recommendations, including Massachusetts, New Jersey, and California. In Nebraska, policymakers have been debating about enacting laws regarding to stealthing, and Davis' research has helped individuals argue for why the law should move forward with stealthing bills.

Davis' research has been used in an effort to pass legislation to include non-consensual condom removal in sexual assault laws. Her research titled "The Intersection of Men's Sexual Violence Perpetration and Sexual Risk Behavior: A Literature Review" has been an argument for passing stealthing laws, stating that in alcohol-related sexual encounters, 42% of "young, male, moderate non-problem drinkers" engaged in coercive tactics regarding condom use, with 10% of that sample reporting non-consensual condom removal. Davis' work regarding the relation of sexual assault and alcohol gained interest when Brett Kavanaugh was nominated to the United States Supreme Court.

=== Notable achievements ===
In 2019, Davis received a Method to Extend Research in Time (MERIT) Award from the National Institute on Alcohol Abuse and Alcoholism for her research grant titled "Men's Sexual Risk Behaviors: Alcohol, Sexual Aggression, and Emotional Factors". Her goal for this research was to "advance our understanding of the role of alcohol in sexual risk behaviors by investigating the mechanisms underlying alcohol-involved sexual risk in both consensual and nonconsensual sexual situations."

Davis received a 2023–2024 Fulbright Scholar Award for her project titled "A Transatlantic Collaboration to Reduce Gender Inequality: Targeting Intoxicated Sexual Assault". With this award, she will work in collaboration with faculty at the University of Birmingham in the United Kingdom to research "ways to reduce sexual assaults involving alcohol through education and perpetrator prevention efforts" and to challenge previously adopted stereotypes that often been adopted into law. This research will mainly be targeted towards perpetrators of sexual assault, since previous research mostly focuses on ways to prevent being a victim of sexual assault. Additionally, Davis and University of Birmingham colleagues will work to translate prior research on alcohol-related sexual assault into real-world prevention practices.

== Honors and awards ==
Davis is a member of several professional organizations, including the American Psychological Association (divisions 35, 50, and 51). In 2018, Davis was a 2018-2019 American Psychological Association Division 35 Initial Fellow. She is also a part of the International Society for Research on Aggression, the Research Society on Alcoholism, the International Academy for Sex Research, and the Society for the Scientific Study of Sexuality. In 2023, Davis was deemed an Editor of the Year for her work as a consulting editor for Psychology of Violence.

Throughout her career, Davis has been invited to speak at several conferences. These include the "National Institute on Alcohol Abuse and Alcoholism Working Group on Intervention Development for Alcohol-related Sexual and Intimate Partner Violence", the "Institute of Mental Health", the "Santa Clara County Office of Women's Policy panel on Psychological Trauma and Sexual Assault", the "Symposium on Sexual Violence in Higher Education: Broadening the Conversation, the "Harborview Center for Sexual Assault and Traumatic Stress Education Forum", the "Sexual Harassment/Assault Response and Prevention (SHARP) Stand Up to Sexual Assault/Harassment meeting". Davis has also presented at several colleges and universities, including the University of Birmingham, Georgia State University, University of Central Florida, University of Florida, University of Massachusetts, Arizona State University, and the University of Washington.
