= Que =

QUE or que may refer to:

- Quebec (Que.), as the traditional abbreviation, though the postal abbreviations are now QC and previously PQ
- Que Publishing, a company which first began as a publisher of technical computer software and hardware support books
- Garmin iQue, a line of products combining PDA devices with integrated GPS receivers
- Trademark of Plastic Logic for an electronic reading device
- Que (tower), a freestanding gate tower characteristic of the tomb architectural ensembles during China's Han dynasty
- Qué!, a Spanish newspaper
- Quwê, an Assyrian vassal state or province at various times from the 9th century BC to shortly after the death of Ashurbanipal around 627 BCE in the lowlands of eastern Cilicia
- An informal term for a member of Omega Psi Phi fraternity, a historically African American Greek-letter fraternity
- London Underground station code for Queensway tube station
- MRT station abbreviation for Queenstown MRT station

== See also ==
- Queue (disambiguation)
- Cue (disambiguation)
- Q (disambiguation)
- What (disambiguation)
- Quebec (disambiguation)
- QC (disambiguation)
