= Q (disambiguation) =

Q, or q, is the seventeenth letter of the English alphabet.

Q may also refer to:

== Arts, entertainment, and media ==
=== Fictional characters ===
- Q (James Bond), in the James Bond novels and films
- Q (Star Trek), a character and the name of the character's species
  - List of Star Trek characters (N–S) § Q
- Q (Street Fighter), from the video game series Street Fighter
- Q, an amnesiac child from the video-game Zero Time Dilemma
- Quinton "Q" Brooks, from the TV series Moesha
- Ah Q, the main character in the novella The True Story of Ah Q
- The Q, from the TV series The Lost Islands

=== Literature ===
- Q (magazine), British music magazine
  - Q Awards, yearly music awards given by Q magazine
- Q (novel), historical novel by Luther Blissett first published in Italian in 1999
- Q source, usually referred to as Q, hypothetical source document inferred from shared material in the Gospels of Matthew and Luke
- Codex Marchalianus, designated by the abbreviation Q, 6th-century Greek manuscript copy of the Septuagint
- "Q" Is for Quarry, the seventeenth novel in Sue Grafton's Alphabet Mystery series, published in 2002
- Q: A Voyage Around the Queen, the US title of a 2024 book by Craig Brown about Queen Elizabeth II
- Sir Arthur Quiller-Couch, a Cornish writer, known by the pseudonym "Q"

=== Music ===
- Q (1970s band), an American disco group
- SSQ (band), formerly Q, an American synth-pop band
- Q (album), Japanese language album by Mr. Children, 2000
- Q, 2019 jazz album by Tom Hasslan, Krokofant, Ståle Storløkken, and Ingebrigt Håker
- Q, 2004 album by poire_z
- "Q", a song by The Future Sound of London under the stage name Mental Cube, 1990
- "Q", a song by AAA, 2006

=== Movies, television, radio, and theater ===
==== Films and series ====
- Q (1982 film), horror film written and directed by Larry Cohen; also known as Q – The Winged Serpent
- Q (2011 film), French erotic drama film; also known as Desire
- q (radio show), CBC Radio One show, formerly called Q
- Q... (TV series), Spike Milligan's BBC2 comedy series that ran between 1969 and 1982
- The Space Museum, a 1965 Doctor Who serial (production code "Q")

==== Networks, stations, and channels ====
- Q (Philippine TV network), previously known as Quality TeleVision (QTV)
- ARY Qtv, a Pakistani television channel
- Q Radio, a UK radio station run by Q magazine
- Q Radio, a former Philippine radio network (2019–2023) of Mareco Broadcasting Network and Horizon of the Sun Communications
  - DWBM-FM, its former flagship station
- Q Television Network, an American cable television network
- Q TV, a UK music channel based on Q magazine
- Q Channel, former names of BTV, an Indonesian television network
- Q 104.3, a radio station in New York City
- Canal Q, a Portuguese television channel
- Sky Q, a subscription-based television and entertainment service
- The Q 90.1 WYQQ, a radio station in central Massachusetts
- The Q 99.7 WLCQ-LP, a radio station in western Massachusetts
- 99.9 The Q WQRC, a radio station serving Cape Cod, Massachusetts

==== Other uses in film and theatre ====
- Q! Film Festival, Jakarta, Indonesia
- Q Theatre, a theatre in London, England

=== Video games ===
- Q (game engine), 3D middleware from Qube Software
- Q, a channel service in QuakeNet's IRC services
- Panasonic Q, a hybrid video game console between a GameCube and a DVD player, manufactured by Nintendo and Panasonic
- Q Entertainment, developer of Rez HD and the Lumines and Meteos games
- Q-Games, developer of the Pixel Junk series of PlayStation 3 games

=== Other uses in arts, entertainment, and media ===
- Queen (chess)
- Queen (playing card)
- The Q (nightclub), an LGBT nightclub in New York City

== Business and commerce ==
- Q Score, in marketing, way to measure the familiarity of an item
- Tobin's q, a financial ratio developed by James Tobin
- Q1, Q2, Q3, or Q4, a quarter year, a three-month period in a calendar year, also known as a trimester
- Initiative Q or Quahl, a payment network and digital currency devised by Saar Wilf
- Quintals, an archaic method of measuring crop yield, was often abbreviated as q
- Q (dairy) or Q–meieriene, a Norwegian dairy brand
- Q-telecom, a Greek telecommunications operator
- The Q (nightclub), an LGBT nightclub in New York City

== Computing ==
=== Artificial intelligence ===
- Amazon Q, AI–powered assistant released in 2023
- Q-learning, AI algorithm
- Q*, a rumored internal name for OpenAI o1

=== Electronics ===
- Q-telecom, a Greek telecommunications operator
- Motorola Q, smartphone released in 2006
- Pentax Q, mirrorless interchangeable lens camera released in 2011
- Electronic transistor, abbreviated Q in e.g. circuit diagrams

=== Programming languages ===
- Q (equational programming language), functional, based on term rewriting, the predecessor to Pure
- Q (programming language from Kx Systems), for array processing
- Q Sharp (Q#), domain-specific, for quantum algorithms, designed by Microsoft Research

=== Other uses in computing ===
- Q (cipher), encryption algorithm published in 2000, invented by Leslie McBride
- Q (emulator), open-source x86 emulator for macOS
- Q (number format), fixed-point number format built into certain computer processors
- Q (software), a computer software package for molecular dynamics simulation
- Q code, in telecommunication

== Engineering ==
- Q the first moment of area, used in calculating shear stress distributions
- Q, the reactive power component of apparent power
- Q factor (bicycles), the width between where the pedals attach to the cranks
- Q factor or Q in resonant systems, a measurement of the effect of resistance to oscillation

== Government, military, and politics ==
- Q clearance, US Department of Energy security clearance
- Quebec, the military time zone code for UTC−04:00
- Q (Sanna's Post) Battery Royal Artillery, UK
- Q Society of Australia, right-wing, anti-Islamic political society

== People ==
=== Musicians ===
- Qurram Hussain of JoSH, known by the stage name "Q"
- Q Marsden, American rapper, known by the stage name "Q"
- Quincy Jones, American record producer and musician, nicknamed "Q"
- Quinnes Parker, member of 112, an American R&B group, nicknamed "Q"
- Q, main dancer and vocalist of South Korean boy band The Boyz
- Schoolboy Q, rapper
- Stacey Q, disco singer

=== Performers and film people ===
- Brian "Q" Quinn, American comedian who stars on the TV show Impractical Jokers
- Q. Smith, American stage actress
- Maggie Q, American actress
- Qaushiq Mukherjee, Indian film director, nicknamed "Q"
- Quentin Elias, called by the pseudonym "Q" in his appearances on the gay porn site Randy Blue
- Q (drag queen), contestant on RuPaul's Drag Race season 16

=== Politics people ===
- Q, pseudonym used by the supposed originator of QAnon, an American far-right conspiracy theory
- Q Manivannan, Member of the Scottish Parliament
- Qiulae Wong, New Zealand politician and the leader of The Opportunity Party
- Q, or Q Martel, nicknames of Giffard Le Quesne Martel, British military engineer and tank strategist

== Mathematics ==
=== Statistics ===
- Q, the proportion of discoveries that are false, whose expected value is the false discovery rate
  - q-value (statistics), in the Storey procedure
- A quartile, designated Q_{1}, Q_{2}, or Q_{3}
- q, the probability of failure of a Bernoulli trial
- Q-function, the tail distribution function of the standard normal distribution

=== Other uses in mathematics ===
- The set of all rational numbers ($\mathbb{Q}$ or Q)
- Robinson arithmetic, a finitely axiomatized fragment of Peano Arithmetic (Q)
- Quadrature component of a sinusoid (Q)
- Quadratic form (Q or q)
- Rotation matrix (Q)
- Quotient, as in "Q-category"
- Proposition, usually the second of two or more (Q)
- Point (geometry), usually the second of two or more (Q)
- Prime number, usually the second of two or more (q)
- The quaternion group Q_{8} or sometimes just Q

== Science ==
=== Astronomy ===
- Q, quasar
- Q star or gray hole
- Q, the Toomre Q parameter, in the (Safronov–)Toomre stability criterion

=== Biochemistry ===
- Glutamine, an amino acid, abbreviated "Q"
- Quinone, abbreviated "Q"
- q, designation for the long arm of a chromosome
- Coenzyme Q, a carrier in electron transport

=== Botany ===
- Quassia, a genus of plants, in family Simaroubaceae
- Quercus, the genus of the oak tree, in family Fagaceae
- Quesnelia, a genus of flowering plants, in family Bromeliaceae
- Quintinia, a genus of evergreen trees and shrubs, in family Paracryphiaceae
- Quisqualis, a genus identified with Combretum, bushwillows, in family Combretaceae

=== Fluid dynamics ===
- Discharge (hydrology) (symbol "Q")
- Q or q, dynamic pressure
  - Max q
- Q, volumetric flow rate

=== Medicine ===
- q, a medical abbreviation for "every"
- Cardiac output (Q), the volume of blood pumped by each ventricle per minute
- Haplogroup Q (mtDNA), a human mitochondrial DNA (mtDNA) haplogroup
- Haplogroup Q-M242 (Y-DNA), a Y-chromosomal DNA (Y-DNA) haplogroup
- Q fever, query fever, or coxiellosis, a human and animal disease

=== Particle physics ===
- Q value (nuclear science), the differences of energies of the parent nuclides to the daughter nuclides
- q or Q, electric charge
- Husimi Q representation of the phase space distribution of a quantum state
- q, quark

=== Thermodynamics ===
- Q, reaction quotient
- Q, heat
- Q, fusion energy gain factor

=== Zoology ===
- Quadrula, a genus of freshwater mussel, in the family Unionidae
- Quaesitosaurus, a genus of sauropod dinosaur, in family Nemegtosauridae
- Quantula, a genus of snail, in family Dyakiidae
- Quadrastichodella, a genus of hymenopteran insects, in family Eulophidae
- Quinqueloculina, a genus of foraminifera single-celled organisms, in family Miliolidae
- Quiscalus, a genus of grackle birds, in family Icteridae

=== Other uses in science ===
- q, quecto-, the metric prefix for 10^{−30}×...
- Q, quetta-, the metric prefix for 10^{30}×...
- q, momentum transfer

== Sports ==
=== Athletes ===
- Bruce Fraser (basketball), NBA assistant coach, nicknamed Q
- Joel Quenneville, Canadian-American ice hockey coach, nicknamed Q
- Quintin Dailey (1961–2010), American basketball player, nicknamed Q
- Anquan Boldin, former American football player, nicknamed Q

=== Other uses in sports ===
- Q School, qualifying school in golf
- Q School (snooker), the qualification school for the World Snooker Tour
- Great Southern Bank Arena, formerly JQH Arena, a nickname for the arena on the campus of Missouri State University
- Q (San Jose Earthquakes mascot), furry blue mascot of the Major League Soccer team San Jose Earthquakes
- San Diego Stadium, later Qualcomm Stadium, a nickname for a stadium in San Diego, California
- Quebec Major Junior Hockey League, often referred to as "The Q"
- Rocket Arena, Cleveland, Ohio; from the arena's previous name, Quicken Loans Arena

== Transportation ==
- Q (New York City Subway service)
- The Q, a nickname for the Chicago, Burlington and Quincy Railroad
- Q-ship, converted merchant vessels with concealed armament intended to lure and destroy submarines
- , the official West Japan Railway Company service symbol for the Kansai Line and Yamatoji Line

== Other uses ==
- Voiceless uvular plosive/stop (International Phonetic Alphabet symbol "q")
- "question", abbreviated "Q"
- Q code, in telecommunication
- Q texture, a Taiwanese term describing the ideal texture of many foods
- Quintus (praenomen)
- Chuluaqui-Quodoushka, a series of New Age sexual meditation exercises developed by Harley Reagan, nicknamed "Q"

== See also ==
- Cue (disambiguation)
- Kyū, rank, in Japanese martial arts and other Japanese grading systems
- Kew (disambiguation)
- Que (disambiguation)
- Cue (disambiguation)
- Queue (disambiguation)
- QQ (disambiguation)
- QQQ (disambiguation)
- QQQQ (disambiguation)
- Q1 (disambiguation)
- Q value (disambiguation)
- Q ratio (disambiguation)
- Q&A (disambiguation)
- Q&Q, a Citizen Watch brand
- Suzie Q (disambiguation)
