= Graeme Obree =

Scottish cyclist

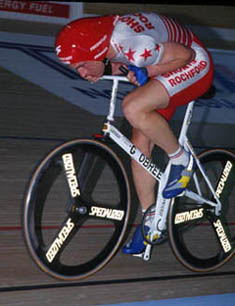
- Obree on Old Faithful

Personal information
- Full name: Graeme Obree
- Nickname: Flying Scotsman
- Born: 11 September 1965 (age 61) Nuneaton, Warwickshire, England
- Height: 1.80 m (5 ft 11 in)
- Weight: 73 kg (161 lb; 11 st 7 lb)

Cycling career
- Sport: Cycling
- Current team: Fullarton Wheelers
- Disciplines: Road and track
- Role: Rider
- Rider type: Time Trial Specialist

Major wins
- Track Individual pursuit, World Championships (1993, 1995) Hour record holder: 1993 (51.596 km), 1994 (52.713 km)
Medal record
Men's track cycling
Representing Great Britain
World Championships
Gold medal – first place	1993 Hamar	4000 m Pursuit
Gold medal – first place	1995 Bogota	4000 m Pursuit

Graeme Obree (born 11 September 1965), nicknamed "the Flying Scotsman", after the famous steam locomotive, is a Scottish racing cyclist who twice broke the world hour record, in July 1993 and April 1994, and was the individual pursuit world champion in 1993 and 1995. He was known for his unusual riding positions and for the Old Faithful bicycle he built which included bearings from a washing machine. He joined a professional team in France but was fired before his first race. He also competed in the men's individual pursuit at the 1996 Summer Olympics.

Obree created some radical innovations in bicycle design and cycling positions, but had problems when the cycling authorities banned the riding positions his designs required. Obree is very open about living with bipolar disorder and depression, and the fact that he has attempted suicide three times. He used his experiences as a means of encouraging other sportspeople to talk about their own mental health.

His life and exploits have been dramatised in the 2006 film The Flying Scotsman and more recently in the documentary film Battle Mountain: Graeme Obree's Story, which follows his journey to Battle Mountain, Nevada to compete in the 2013 World Human Powered Speed Championships.

In March 2010, he was inducted into the Scottish Sports Hall of Fame.

== Biography ==
=== Origins ===
Obree was born in Nuneaton, a large town in northern Warwickshire, England, but has lived almost all his life in Scotland and considers himself Scottish.

He attempted suicide in his teens by gassing himself. He was saved by his father, who had returned early from work.

An individual time triallist, his first race was a 10-mile time trial to which he turned up wearing shorts, an anorak and Doc Marten boots. He thought the start and finish were at the same place and stopped where he had started, 100 metres short of the end. He had started to change his clothes when officials told him to continue. He still finished in "about 30 minutes."

The bike shop that he ran failed and he decided the way out of his problems was to attack the world hour velodrome record. It had been held for nine years by Francesco Moser, at 51.151 kilometres. Obree said:

The record had fascinated me since Moser broke it. It was the ultimate test – no traffic, (Note: The slipstream from passing traffic can increase the speed of time-triallists on busy roads) one man in a velodrome against the clock. I didn't tell myself that I will attempt the record, I said I would break it. When your back is against the wall, you can say it's bad or you can say: 'I'll go for it.' I decided, that's it, I've as good as broken the record.

=== Old Faithful ===
Obree had built frames for his bike shop and made another for his record attempt. Instead of traditional dropped handlebars it had straight bars like those of a mountain bike. He placed them closer to the saddle than usual and rode with the bars under his chest, his elbows bent and tucked into his sides like those of a skier. Watching a washing machine spin at 1,200rpm led him to take the bearings, which he assumed must be of superior quality, and fit them to his bike. Obree later regretted admitting to the bearings experiment, because journalists referred to that before his achievements and other innovations.

Obree called his bike "Old Faithful". It has a narrow bottom bracket, around which the cranks revolve, to bring his legs closer together (giving a smaller Q factor), as he thought this is the "natural" position. As shown in the film, he thought a tread of "one banana" would be ideal. The bike has no top tube, so that his knees did not hit the frame. The chainstays are not parallel to the ground. Thus the cranks can pass with a narrow bottom bracket. The fork had only one blade, carefully shaped to be as narrow as possible. A French writer who tried it said the narrow handlebars made it hard to accelerate the machine in a straight line but, once it was at speed, he could hold the bars and get into Obree's tucked style.

At a high enough speed, [I could] tuck in my arms. And, above all, get in a very forward position on the bike, on the peak of the saddle. The Obree position isn't advantageous simply aerodynamically, it also allows, by pushing the point of pedalling towards the rear, to benefit from greater pressure while remaining in the saddle. You soon get an impression of speed, all the greater because you've got practically nothing [deux fois rien] between your hands. Two other things I noticed after a few hundred metres: I certainly didn't have the impression of turning 53 × 13, and the Obree position is no obstruction to breathing. But I wasn't pedalling at 55 km/h, 100 turns of the pedals a minute, yet my arms already hurt.

=== Taking the record ===
Obree attacked Moser's record, on 16 July 1993, at the Vikingskipet velodrome in Norway. (Note: The track, 250m round, was built of Siberian pine in three and a half weeks to convert the indoor speed skating arena to a velodrome for the cycling world championships, and was removed shortly afterwards.) He failed by nearly a kilometre. He had booked the track for 24 hours and decided to come back the next day. The writer Nicholas Roe said:

To stop his aching body seizing up, Obree then took the unusual measure of drinking pint upon pint of water so that he had to wake up to go to the lavatory every couple of hours through the night. Each time he got up, he stretched his muscles. On the next weary day, he was up and out within minutes, at the deserted velodrome by 7:55 am and on the track ready to start just five minutes after that. He had barely slept. He had punished his body hugely the previous day. Surely this was a waste of time?

Obree said:

I was Butch Cassidy in terms of swagger. I didn't want any negativity. This was blitzkrieg. I'm going in there. Let me do it. I'm not going to be the timorous guy from Scotland. That's what the difference was. Purely mental state. The day before, I had been a mouse. Now I was a lion.

On 17 July 1993, Obree set a new record of 51.596 kilometres, beating Moser's record of 51.151 kilometres by 445 metres.

=== Losing the record ===
Obree's triumph lasted less than a week. On 23 July 1993, the British Olympic champion, Chris Boardman broke Obree's record by 674 metres, riding 52.270 km at Bordeaux. His bike had a carbon monocoque frame, carbon wheels, and a triathlon handlebar. Their rivalry grew: a few months later Obree knocked Boardman out of the world championship pursuit to take the title himself.

=== Regaining the record ===
Francesco Moser, whose record Obree had beaten, adopted Obree's riding position—adding a chest pad—and established not an outright world record but a veterans' record of 51.84 kilometres. He did it on 15 January 1994, riding in the thin air of Mexico City as he had for his outright record, whereas Obree and Boardman had ridden at close to sea level.

Obree retook the record on 27 April 1994, using the track that Boardman had used at Bordeaux. He had bolted his shoes to his pedals, to avoid what had happened in the final of the national pursuit championship, when he pulled his foot off the pedal during his starting effort. (Note: Bolting shoes to the pedals was pioneered by the Australian sprinter John Nicholson at the world championship in Leicester in 1970. Riders today use cleats on the soles of their shoes, which combined with specially designed pedals, make the accidental separation of the shoe from the pedal highly unlikely when the tension is properly adjusted.)

He rode 52.713 kilometres, a distance beaten on 2 September 1994 by the Spanish Tour de France winner, Miguel Induráin.

=== Old Faithful banned ===
The world governing body, the Union Cycliste Internationale, grew concerned that changes to bicycles were making a disproportionate influence to track records. Among other measures, it banned his riding position: he did not find out until one hour before he began the world championship pursuit in Italy. Judges disqualified him when he refused to comply. The magazine Cycling Weekly blamed "petty-minded officialdom."

Obree developed another riding position, the "Superman" style, his arms fully extended in front, and he won the individual pursuit at the world championships with this and Old Faithful in 1995. That position was also banned. However, in May 2014 the UCI relented, acknowledging that fixing the kind of equipment to be used was hindering technical progress. It restored previous banned world records, from 2000, now to be described as "Best hour performance".

The original Old Faithful bike is on display at the National Museum of Scotland in Edinburgh, while two near-replicas built for use in the Flying Scotsman film are displayed in the Riverside Transport Museum in Glasgow.

In March 2018, Obree tested another replica of Old Faithful in the Mercedes-Benz F1 team's wind tunnel to gauge the aerodynamic efficiency of his various riding positions on the bike, having never previously participated in wind-tunnel testing. It was found that the Cd (drag coefficient) of Obree's initial "tuck" or "crouch" position was 0.17, compared to a conventional 1990s bike position of 0.20 and a modern conventional position of 0.188, leading to an estimated gain in speed of about 2-2.5 km/h over his rivals in the 1990s and a gain of 1.5 km/h over contemporary track cyclists: meanwhile the "Superman" position was found only to be marginally more efficient than the 1990s conventional position, and less efficient than the modern conventional position. Obree however noted that the discomfort of the "crouch" position takes a lot of energy out of the rider through holding the hands and shoulders in place, whilst the "Superman" position was much more manageable.

=== Other achievements ===
Obree was individual pursuit world champion in 1993 and 1995. He broke the British 10-mile individual time trial record in 1993, won the RTTC 50-mile championship the same year (a record 1h 39m 1s), and won the 25-mile championship in 1996. In 1997 he joined forces with coach Joe Beer and clocked 18m 36s in a 10-mile time trial (V718 Hull) and next day won the British Cycling Federation 25-mile championship - this was part of building towards an hour record attempt that was eventually shelved.

The writer Peter Bryan, of The Times, said:

To see Obree in full flight, shoulders hunched and elbows tucked into his ribs, is a memorable sight. His face contorted with pain illustrates the effort he is putting in. And yet, not too many minutes after he has finished a ride the champion is sufficiently relaxed to talk with a queue of pressmen.

=== Professional career ===
Obree rode his hour records as an amateur. He took a professional licence after winning his first world championship, telling Bryan: "I reckon I can make more money on the bike than I get from unemployment benefit."

He joined Le Groupement, a French team but did not attend a meeting in Les Carroz d'Arâches (fr) and was fired for "lack of professionalism." Obree had been racing in Florida when the team first met. But he was on holiday there when the team met again for publicity photographs. He got to the next get-together but flew to Paris instead of Lille, where the meeting was held.

The team manager, Patrick Valcke, said:

"If a rider has that attitude, it's best to stop working together as soon as possible. We paid for his tickets [to fly from Glasgow to Geneva] and he didn't even turn up, didn't even phone to explain why he was not coming. He said that he did not want to leave his family so soon after the death of his brother (see below) but he could have phoned to tell us that. I don't want any more to do with him."

Obree said: "I was too ill to attend the get-together and had no success when I attempted to contact team officials on 1 January. My wife, Anne, who is a nurse, insisted I was not well enough to travel to France."

The Le Groupement team fell apart after a short time, when the sponsoring company was involved in scandal, with accusations that it was nothing but a pyramid selling scheme. Some of the team members claimed that they were owed money, and their wages had not been paid.

=== Attitude to doping ===
Obree said of his short professional career:

"I still feel I was robbed of part of my career. I was signed up to ride in the prologue of the Tour back in 1995, but it was made very obvious to me I would have to take drugs. I said no, no way, and I was sacked by my team. So there I was, 11 years later, sitting there waiting for the Tour cyclists to come by, and something welled up in me. I feel I was robbed by a lot of these bastards taking drugs. I also hate the way that people think anyone who has ever achieved anything on a bike must have been taking drugs. I was surprised how resentful I felt when I was in Paris. It had obviously been simmering away in there for years. That's something new I'll have to talk to my therapist about."

In 1996, he told the magazine L'Équipe:

"In my opinion, 99 percent of riders at elite level take EPO or a similar drug, not particularly to dope themselves but to be at the same level as the others. And that's rather sad." (Note: "A mon avis, 99% des coureurs de l'élite prennent aujourd'hui de l'EPO ou une drogue similaire. Pas forcément pour se doper, mais pour être au même niveau que les autres. Et c'est plutôt navrant.")

=== New Hour record attempt ===
In May 2009, Obree announced that he would make an attempt at the "Athlete's Hour" record on a bike he had built himself during 2009. Obree said in October 2009 that the attempt had been cancelled as the bike he'd built himself was not suitable for the conditions. He will not be attempting this again.

In December 2009, he was inducted into the British Cycling Hall of Fame while in March 2010, he was inducted into the Scottish Sports Hall of Fame.

=== Human-powered vehicle land speed record ===
In December 2011, Obree announced that he would make an attempt at the human-powered vehicle (HPV) land speed record, hoping to hit 100 mph. In May 2012, he revealed that the bike he is building for this attempt is a prone bike.

The attempt was originally to take place in Britain, and the record speed was then 82.8 miles per hour (133.3 km/h). However, he competed in the 2013 World Human Powered Speed Championships in Battle Mountain, Nevada, where the record was also set. He achieved a speed of 56.62 miles per hour (91.12 km/h) on the morning of Friday, 13 September.

While Obree did not break the HPV land speed record, he did set a new record for a rider in the prone position. The previous day, Obree had set a speed of 52.9 miles per hour (85.1 km/h), which was a record speed in the prone position on a two-wheeled HPV (the overall prone record being held by a trike).

=== Personal life ===
In the 1990s Obree took an overdose of aspirin washed down by water from a puddle. He had personality problems, sniffed the gas he used to weld bicycles, and was being chased for £492 owed in college fees. Obree's brother, Gordon, died in a car crash in October 1994, and Obree again slid in and out of depression. In 2001 he was found unconscious at Bellsland Farm in Kilmaurs, 12 km from his Ayrshire home. The Obree family horse was stabled there and he was discovered by a woman checking a barn. He had tried to hang himself.

Obree is divorced from his wife, with whom he has two children.

In January 2011, Obree disclosed in an interview with the Scottish Sun that he is gay and that his difficulty with coming to terms with his sexual orientation contributed to his earlier suicide attempts. "I was brought up by a war generation; they grew up when gay people were put in jail. Being homosexual was so unthinkable that you just wouldn't be gay. I'd no inkling about anything, I just closed down." He came out to his family in 2005. Obree has bipolar disorder.

He continues to race occasionally in individual time trials for Ayrshire-based Fullarton Wheelers cycling club. In May 2005, he crashed in the rain in the national 10-mile time trial championship near Nantwich in Cheshire. He was a member of the winning three-man club squad that took the team title in the Scottish 10-mile championship in May 2006. In December 2006, he competed in the track event, Revolution 15, in a four kilometre pursuit challenge.

Obree is a motivational speaker, bringing light to mental health issues.

== Book and films ==
He published his autobiography in 2003 titled The Flying Scotsman. (Note: Published by Birlinn, UK, with a foreword by Francesco Moser) He said: "It started with the psychologist saying it would do me good and ended up as my life story." A film based on the book premiered at the Edinburgh International Film Festival in 2006, starring Jonny Lee Miller and Billy Boyd. In November 2006 Metro-Goldwyn Mayer bought world distribution rights and the film was released in the US on 29 December 2006; it was given a UK release on 29 June 2007. The DVD was released in the UK on 5 November 2007.

Battle Mountain: Graeme Obree's Story, a documentary film about Obree's appearance at the 2013 World Human Powered Speed Championships in Battle Mountain, Nevada, premiered at the 2015 Edinburgh International Film Festival. The film, directed by David Street with music by Alun Woodward of Chemikal Underground, went on public release on 21 March 2016, with a tour of cinemas featuring a question-and-answer session with Obree following screenings. The film was crowdfunded through the Kickstarter website.

== Major results ==
1993
Best human effort: 51.596 km
1st Individual pursuit, UCI Track World Championships
4th Chrono des Herbiers
4th Firenze–Pistoia
10th Grand Prix Eddy Merckx
1994
Best human effort: 52.713 km
1995
1st Individual pursuit, UCI Track World Championships
UCI Track World Cup Classics

1st Individual pursuit, Athens
1st Individual pursuit, Cottbus
1st Individual pursuit, Adelaide
2nd Individual pursuit, Tokyo
2nd Individual pursuit, Manchester

2nd Millemetri del Corso di Mestre
7th Firenze–Pistoia
1996
UCI Track World Cup Classics

2nd Individual pursuit, Havana

1997
1st Time trial, National Road Championships

== Related media ==
- Flying Scotsman: Cycling to Triumph Through My Darkest Hours Graeme Obree VeloPress 2005 ISBN 1-931382-72-7
- Flying Scotsman Graeme Obree Birlinn Books 2003 ISBN 1-84158-335-9
- The Flying Scotsman at IMDb
- "The Flying Scotsman speaks: Graeme Obree interview stv website". Archived from the original on 30 September 2007.
- "Graeme Obree interview: Velo Club Don Logan Podcast (Feb 2011)".
