= QQQQ =

QQQQ may refer to:

- Invesco QQQ, an exchange-traded fund based on the Nasdaq-100 stock index (former ticker symbol QQQQ)
- The Morse code for unknown attacker, used in conjunction with SOS
- The poker hand "Village People", composed of four queens; see List of playing-card nicknames

== See also ==
- QQQ (disambiguation)
- QQ (disambiguation)
- Q (disambiguation)
