= QQ (disambiguation) =

QQ refers to Tencent QQ, a Chinese instant messaging program.

QQ or qq may also refer to:

== Businesses and brands ==
- QQ Magazine, a gay lifestyle magazine (1969 – ca. 1982)
- Chery QQ, two compact Chinese cars models
- Alliance Airlines (IATA code QQ)
- Qinetiq (LSE stock symbol QQ)
- Reno Air, former IATA code QQ

== Places ==
- Queen's Quay, Belfast, area in Belfast, Northern Ireland
- Queen's Quay, Toronto, street in Toronto

== Other uses ==
- Q–Q plot, a plot to compare distributions in statistics
- QQ, an emoticon referring to a pair of tearing eyes
- Q texture, an originally Taiwanese term for the ideal texture of many foods
- a Perl operator for quoting strings
- Quarter quadrangle, in cartography
- The Web of Fear, a 1968 Doctor Who serial (production code QQ)

== See also ==
- Q (disambiguation)
- QQQ (disambiguation)
- QQQQ (disambiguation)
