= Q. gracilis =

Q. gracilis may refer to:

- Quedrastichodella gracilis, an hymenopteran species found in Japan
- Quinqueloculina gracilis, a foraminifer species in the genus Quinqueloculina

== See also ==
- Gracilis (disambiguation)
