= QQQ (disambiguation) =

QQQ is an Australian television station broadcasting in remote eastern, southern and central areas of Australia.

QQQ may also refer to:

- Frontier in Space, a 1973 Doctor Who serial with production code QQQ
- Triple quadrupole mass spectrometer (QqQ), a mass spectrometer comprising three consecutive quadrupoles
- QQQ is the ticker symbol for Invesco QQQ, an exchange-traded fund (ETF) based on the Nasdaq-100 Index created by Invesco PowerShares
- A Morse code signal for unknown attacker, used in conjunction with SOS
- qqq, one of ISO 639 Reserved for local use language codes (used e.g. for message documentation in MediaWiki)

== See also ==
- QQQQ (disambiguation)
- QQ (disambiguation)
- Q (disambiguation)
