= Q value =

Q value, Q factor, and Q score may refer to:

- Q factor, a measurement of a resonant system's relative bandwidth
- Radiation weighting factors used in ionizing radiation dosimetry
- Q factor (bicycles), the width between where a bicycle's pedals attach to the cranks
- q-value (statistics), the minimum false discovery rate at which the test may be called significant
- Q value (nuclear science), a difference of energies of parent and daughter nuclides
- Q Score, in marketing, a way to measure the familiarity of an item
- Fusion energy gain factor Q, the ratio of fusion power produced in a reactor to the power required to maintain the plasma in steady state
- Q (number format), in number theory, a way of representing decimal numbers in a fixed-point math system
- Q factor (digital communications), a way of representing bit error rates in dB

== See also ==
- Q ratio (disambiguation)
