= Q-Telecom =

- Type: Privately held company
- Industry: Telecommunications
- Founded: 2002, Athens, Greece
- Fate: Merged with Wind Hellas
- Headquarters: Athens, Greece
- Products: Mobile Telephony
- Parent: Wind Hellas
- Website: myq.gr

Q-Telecom is the fourth mobile telephony provider in Greece. It began operation in June 2002. As of 2008, it called itself "Q" and its services "MyQ." The company provided GSM phone service, supported by LMDS and backbone networks, and called itself the only complete and integrated telecom provider in Greece. In May 2007, it merged with WIND Hellas, which was known at the time as TIM Hellas. It runs under its own unique brand "Q-Telecom".

== Company profile ==
Q-Telecom (former Mobile Network Code: 202-09) was initially a division of Info-Quest. It billed itself as the first private Greek operator to provide combined mobile and fixed telephony as well as Internet service. Focusing on large urban centers, it developed a second-generation mobile telephony network and a broadband fixed wireless access network, point-to-multipoint, operating in the 3.5 GHz band. It also developed a national leased line and privately owned transmission network. Q-Telecom was directly connected to the Hellenic Telecommunication Organization (OTE) and the three other mobile operators. It advertised high-quality voice services, a high call switching transfer rate, and pan-Hellenic coverage via national roaming with Vodafone Greece.

It combined mobile telephony services with the prefix 699 (prepaid and postpaid), SMS, and fixed telephony via the carrier selection code 1765. The company billed itself as providing customized services, per second billing, no set-up fees, mobile number selection, preferential rates with Q-Family, the lowest tariff rate for SMS, and added value services.

== Acquisitions and eventual merger into WIND Hellas ==
Troy Communications announced its plan to acquire Q-Telecom in 2005 for a cash consideration of €325 million and the assumption of existing indebtedness of €25 million. Troy Communications already owned the third-largest Greek mobile phone provider, WIND Hellas, which was known as TIM Hellas until 5 June 2007. When the acquisition was complete in October 2006, Q-Telecom subscribers were able to use WIND GR's (at that time TIM GR) network for national roaming. Wind Greece did not renew the roaming agreement with Vodafone GR for Q-Telecom subscribers, which led to Q-Telecom subscribers only being able to do national roaming on WIND GR.

WIND Hellas and Q-Telecom were later both acquired by Weather Investments.

Postpaid customers were offered new WIND Hellas SIM cards, retaining their old numbers. Existing Q-card customers continued to use their Q-Telecom SIM cards, although technically they were "roaming" on the WIND Hellas network. New Q subscribers were given SIM cards that appeared to be Q-cards, although WIND Hellas (MNC: 202 10) was their home carrier. The radio network of Q-Telecom (MNC: 202 09) was disbanded in May 2007. Q-Telecom's bands are currently used by WIND Hellas on its radio network (MNC: 202 10). Q-Telecom employees became WIND Hellas employees.

== Remaining Q-Telecom branded services ==
=== Q-card ===
Q-card remains as a prepaid wireless product.

=== Ya! telephone card ===
The Ya! prepaid telephone scratch card allows calls to be made from residential or public phones. It is used mainly by students and young people, and for international calls by tourists and people from other countries living in Greece. Ya means two things in Greek: Γεια means "hello" and για means "for", so the card's slogans are "Say Hello", "For everyone", "For (calls to) all over Greece and the world".

=== Q-shop ===
Q telecom has launched a shop in its website that sells second hand devices. There are three categories A, B and C in which it translates the device condition and malfunction. According to the category that is chosen the phones prices are also changing from A being the most expensive to C being the least.

== TV and radio campaigns ==
Q-Telecom was known in Greece for its publicity campaign on both TV and radio. The ads contained small cartoon characters (the "Q-ies" or "Q-δάκια" in Greek) that resembled the company's logo. They used slang to promote the company's offers and slogans, such as "no fixed fees". These "Q-ies" started being used in 2003, and were retired in 2013.

== See also ==
- Communications in Greece
- http://www.chadbourne.com/files/upload/Hellas_Adversary_Complaint.pdf

== Related links ==
Q-Telecom "My Q" Official Website (Greek)
