= Q ratio (disambiguation) =

Q ratio, also known as Tobin's q, is an economics term for the ratio between the market value and replacement value of the same physical asset.

Q ratio or Q-ratio may also refer to:

- Q-ratio (poker), the relation of a poker player's stack to the tournament players' average stack
- q-ratio in selection cutting in forestry
- anabolic to androgenic ratio in pharmacology applications such as methasterone

== See also ==
- Q value (disambiguation)
- Q factor
