= The Q (nightclub) =

Gay nightclub in Manhattan, New York City

- Logo

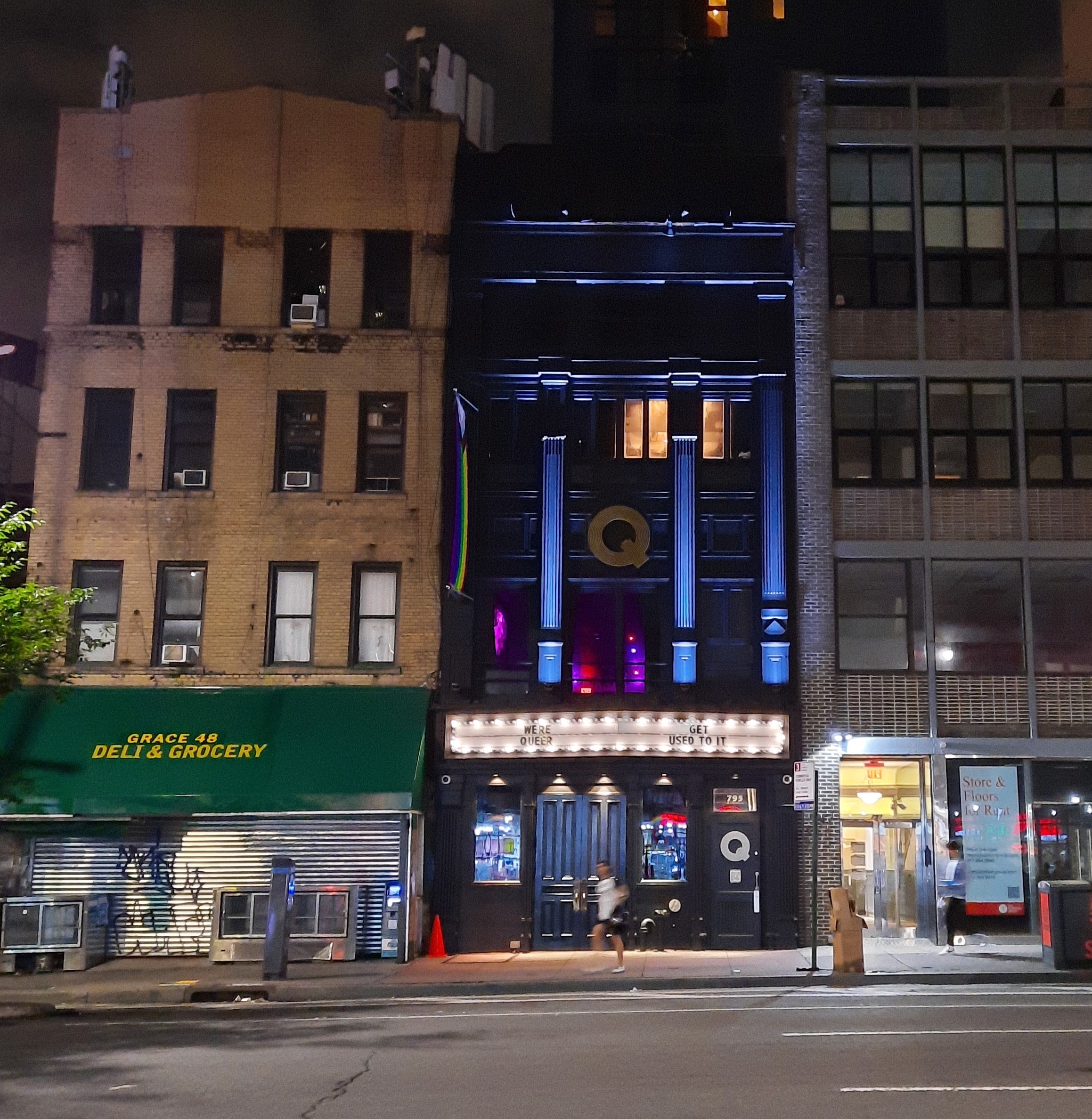
- Exterior of the Q in August 2021
- Interactive map of The Q
- Address: 795 Eighth Avenue
- Location: Hell's Kitchen, Manhattan, New York City
- Coordinates: 40.7613°N 73.9872°W
- Owner: Bob Fluet; Alan Picus; Frankie Sharp
- Type: Gay bar; nightclub
- Public transit: 49th Street station; 50th Street station (C and E trains); 50th Street station (1 train); Seventh Avenue station

Construction
- Opened: June 25, 2021
- Closed: March 27, 2023

Website
- theqnyc.com

The Q was a multilevel LGBTQ nightclub in the Hell's Kitchen neighborhood of Manhattan in New York City. Backed by celebrity investors including Billy Porter and Zachary Quinto, the club was billed as "the largest queer-owned and -operated nightlife venue in Manhattan". It was known for its five distinctly themed rooms and for its entertainment selection, which featured A-list comedians, prominent local drag queens, burlesque acts and jazz bands. The establishment was originally set to open in 2020, but its debut was pushed to June 2021 due to the COVID-19 pandemic. In June 2022, Frankie Sharp—one of the club's three founding owners—filed a lawsuit against the other two, Alan Picus and Bob Fluet. The club shuttered in March 2023 in the aftermath of the legal proceedings. During its operation, the Q garnered praise from critics, who have described it as innovative, inclusive and chic.

== Description ==
Located on Eighth Avenue near 48th Street in the Hell's Kitchen neighborhood of Manhattan in New York City, the Q was a four-story venue containing five distinct clubbing areas. Frankie Sharp, who co-founded the club, stated to Thrillist and Queerty that it was "the largest queer-owned and -operated nightlife venue in Manhattan".

Live music and performances took place on the Q's ground level, which was outfitted with parquet floors, booths and mirrors. The second floor, styled like a lounge, contained a bar and a "'Gentlethem's Club' (Note: A portmanteau of gentlemen's club and accusative singular they) nestled behind a tufted wall". The top level was an open clubbing space with 20-foot (6.1-meter) ceilings, a suspended catwalk, a high DJ platform and decorative LED screens bearing the venue's emblem. In some areas, the walls were adorned with graffiti, queer movie posters and sexual artwork, including a Tom of Finland mural and a drawing of "a buff Ned Flanders from The Simpsons with protruding nipples".

The establishment hosted a number of weekly drag and music shows, which starred "prominent local entertainers like jazz musician Richard Cortez and drag queens Lagoona Bloo, Jasmine Rice Labeija, and Kizha Carr". It also featured A-list comedy events, burlesque and go-go dancing.

== History ==
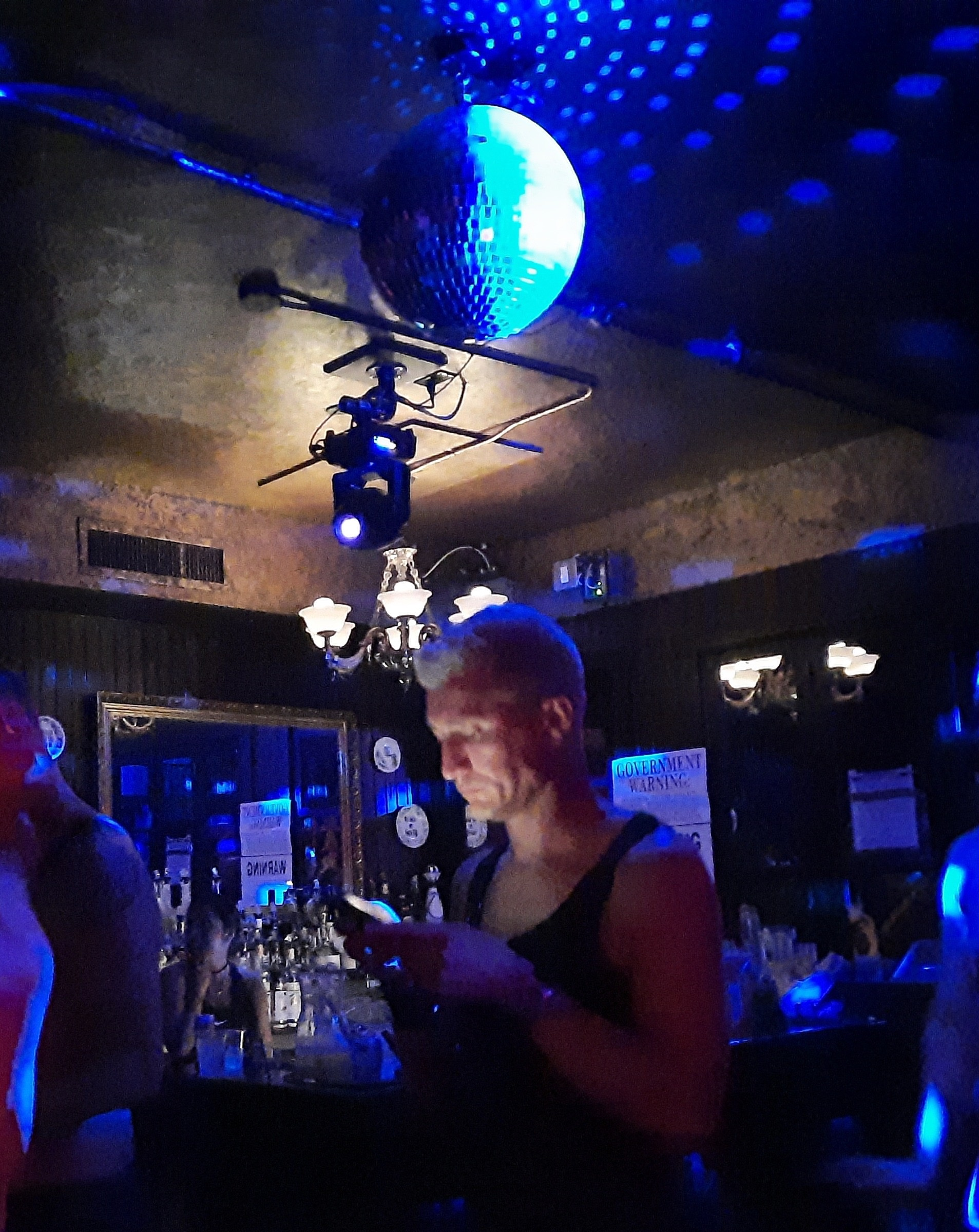
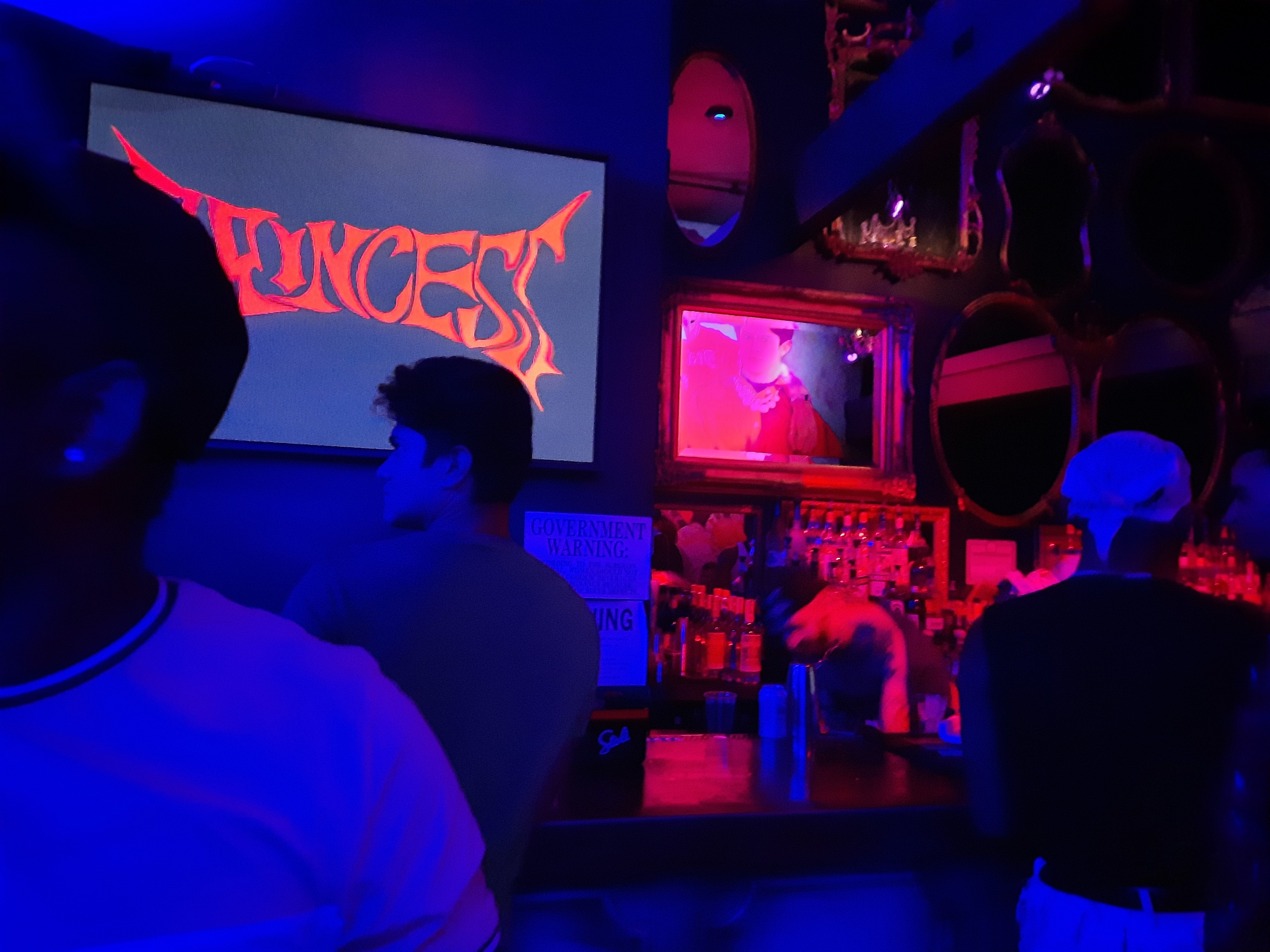
Bars on the venue's second (top) and third floors (bottom)

The Q was originally co-owned by Sharp, an event producer and DJ; Bob Fluet, a co-founder of the Boxers NYC bar chain; and Alan Picus, a party promoter. Sharp expressed intentions to open "a multi-floor LGBTQ nightclub ... that would redefine the genre" in early 2020, but the onset of the COVID-19 pandemic delayed these plans. The Q's lease had been set to start on March 10 of that year, just days before nonessential businesses in New York were ordered to shutter. Several months later, the building's landlord proposed a "'COVID-friendly' deal" that enabled the venue's co-owners to proceed with construction. Sharp, Fluet and Picus subsequently secured investments from celebrities including Billy Porter, Zachary Quinto, Charlie Carver and Jake Shears.

In a March 2021 interview with Michael Musto, Sharp announced that the club would open as soon as it could feasibly do so under the circumstances of the pandemic. Excitement over the Q's debut drew press attention throughout the spring, with Instinct's Michael Cook calling it "one of the most anticipated nightlife openings in recent memory". The club's inaugural party was held on June 25, which coincided with the end of Pride month. The venue sold out a number of high-profile events during its first week. As of July 2021, the establishment required proof of vaccination against COVID-19 for entry.

=== Lawsuit ===
On May 16 or June 10, 2022, Sharp—who had divested from the Q—filed a lawsuit against Picus, Fluet and the Q's parent company (Bar Fluid, LLC, which is owned by Fluet) for "breach of contract, breach of fiduciary duty, fraud, unjust enrichment and accounting". The court filings included claims that Sharp's employment contract was violated; that Picus instructed Q security to not check patron IDs and to allow drugs such as GHB into the venue; that Picus sometimes told door employees to deny entry to women; and that Picus made racist and transphobic statements, such as: "I don't need to break my back to hire people just because they're black and trans," and "Make sure [the club's] Latin nights are the good kind of Latins. Not Blatinos," referring to dark-skinned Latinx people.

Other local nightlife venues complained that underage patrons who gained access to the Q attempted to purchase alcohol at their establishments using Q wristbands. NPR reported that the Q had acquired a reputation as a place to go for underage drinking.

Sharp said that Picus also discriminated on the basis of weight when hiring staff, and other employees commented that women and Black people were rarely employed by the Q. One female employee stated that she received fewer and fewer shifts until she was taken off the schedule. The lawsuit also included allegations that Picus "[had] public sex with customers in front of employees, [took] advantage of young gay men, and [made] sexual comments to staff and patrons." Picus's attorney refuted these claims.

A former Q patron stated to NPR that after a bouncer "caressed her stomach and grabbed her waist in an ... inappropriate way that left her feeling shaken," she was directed to report the incident to Picus, who "[did not] seem to take the accusation seriously and ultimately dismissed all responsibility". He did not respond to a private message she sent him on Instagram to follow up.

Sharp's court documents additionally read that four of the Q's senior managers quit or had been fired over the course of the year due to conflict with Picus. Of his own termination, he said that when he brought his concerns to Fluet—including by presenting security footage of Picus engaging in sexual activity with a patron in a public part of the club—he was given the option to either resign with "four percent of net profits for the remainder of the lease and a small cash disbursement in exchange for signing a non-disclosure agreement ('NDA')" or be fired. Because he refused to sign the NDA, "Fluet terminated his employment on May 23, 2022, as an at-will employee without cause."

In July 2022, Instinct reached out to Sharp, Fluet and Picus for comment. Picus did not respond, Sharp replied that he had no comment, and Fluet said:

When we started looking for a venue, it was Alan and myself, and we were looking for somebody to join us, and we reached out to Frankie. The truth is, I was told to be careful and that there are demons unfortunately.... I think his demons took control and kind of put me in a situation where I had no choice.... There are a lot of false allegations that are being made, and I didn't know where from until I found out where from. I obviously did all of my leg work to make sure that nothing is real, which it wasn't.

Fluet further stated to NPR that he had not been able to keep as close an eye on the Q as he wanted, because he was busy with Hush and Boxers HK, the two other Hell's Kitchen nightlife venues he owns. Sharp and other employees indicated that they nevertheless brought complaints about Picus directly to Fluet on multiple occasions.

On July 5, Fluet announced via the Q's Instagram profile that Luis Fernando, the club's creative director, would replace Picus as its executive producer.

Fluet later filed counterclaims stating that Sharp's filing of the initial lawsuit and his public statements about it on Instagram were defamatory. In October 2023, the Supreme Court of New York County denied a motion by Sharp's lawyer to dismiss these counterclaims, then rejected a subsequent motion to reargue the former in July 2024. Sharp then filed an appeal with the Appellate Division of the New York Supreme Court, which reversed the county court's decision and dismissed Fluet's counterclaims in April 2025.

=== Criminal incidents ===
In November 2022, local and international media reported that a 33-year-old man, John Umberger, died under suspicious circumstances after leaving the Q with two unidentified men on Memorial Day weekend. When he was found in his employer's Upper East Side residence on June 1, toxicology reports showed that he had fentanyl, p-fluoro fentanyl, heroin, cocaine, lidocaine and ethanol in his system. He was presumed to have been drugged, and the police investigation found that "[h]is phone and credit cards were stolen and more than $25,000 was drained from his bank account."

The New York City Police Department investigated a possible connection between this incident and more than a dozen others involving drugging and robbery of local gay men, including one in April 2022 in which 25-year-old Julio Ramirez was drugged, robbed and subsequently found dead after leaving the Ritz, another Hell's Kitchen gay club. EDGE Media Network reported that another parent came forward about their son being drugged and robbed after leaving the Q in early April 2022, though that man survived. The press referred to the suspected group of perpetrators of these attacks as the "roofie robbers".

In January 2023, a 29-year-old man named Jordan Taylor went missing outside of the Q. As of March 2023, he had not been found.

On March 23, 2023, the New York County District Attorney issued arrest warrants for three men charged with first-degree murder of Umberger and Ramirez. In February 2025, Jayqwan Hamilton, Jacob Barroso, and Robert DeMaio were convicted of drugging, robbing and murdering Umberger and Ramirez. The trial included testimonies from other men who were drugged at Hell's Kitchen gay bars, robbed, and left unconscious but survived. Two other men, Shane Hoskins and Andre Butts—who collaborated with Hamilton, Barroso and DeMaio—had previously pleaded guilty to robbery charges.

=== Closure ===
The Q closed abruptly on March 27, 2023. An anonymous source from the venue told WERRRK.com that this was "most likely the result of management missteps, coupled with the inability to recover after the massively poor PR that came from accusations of racism and sexual harassment ... in July of 2022." The same source said that the establishment had been losing money and that it had made poor choices when hiring performers and DJs, who were not drawing a crowd that spent money on drinks, which resulted in staffing cuts and delays in employees' pay. Club manager Xavier Pineda started a GoFundMe page to raise funds to support the Q's staff members, who were suddenly out of work.

== Reception ==
The basement loo actually had a shirtless DJ spinning tracks, and various semi-drag queens were doing runway in front of the mirror for extra camp surrealness. Even relieving yourself becomes performance art at the Q.

— Michael Musto, describing the Q's opening night

Kyler Alvord of Thrillist called the Q "a game-changing queer venue that caters to every interest", remarking that it "brings four floors of old-school grit and glam to Manhattan's queer nightlife scene". He further commented: "While the Q revives some of the grit and allure synonymous with classic NYC gay clubs, it arrives with an added emphasis on respect and inclusion."

A July 2021 Travel Gay review said the establishment was "set to become one of the biggest gay destinations in New York". After attending the Q's opening weekend events, Musto dubbed it "[a] giddy Bloomingdale's of gay chic". Insider's Moises Mendez II wrote that "each floor [has] a different vibe from the last, and as you make your way up the stairs, each space became even more energetic and vibrant".

W42ST.com listed the Q as a runner-up for its 2021 Best of Awards, together with a quotation characterizing it as "a fun new club that has a solid variety of high-quality events".

== See also ==
- Impact of the COVID-19 pandemic on the LGBT community
- LGBT culture in New York City
- List of LGBTQ bars
- List of nightclubs in New York City
