= Bottom bracket =

Bicycle component

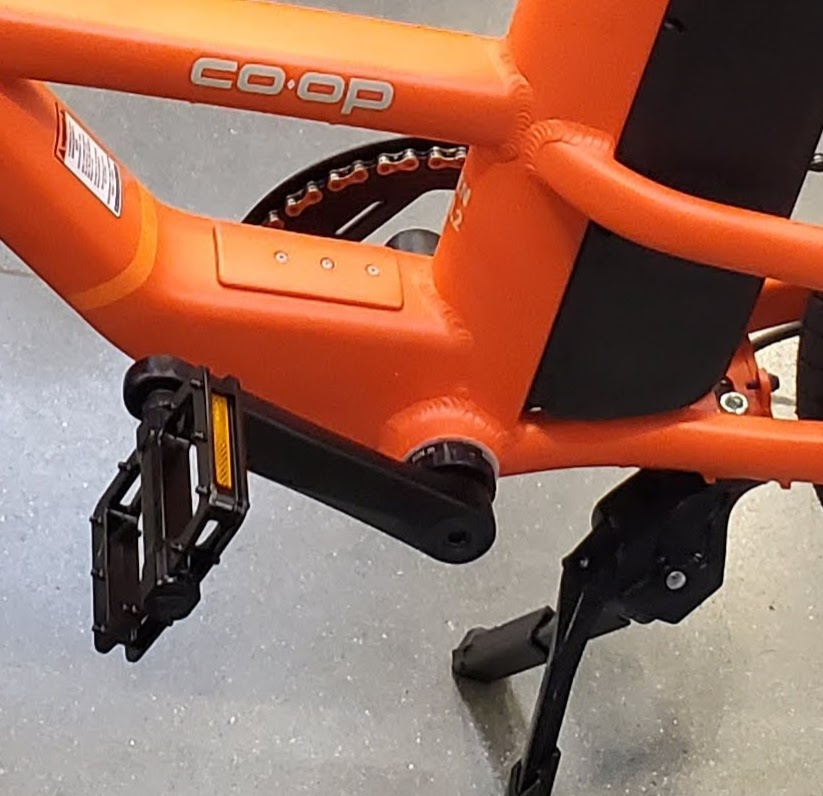
A bottom bracket in a bicycle. The crankarms and chainring are attached to the spindle of the bottom bracket, which is installed in the bottom bracket shell. The bottom bracket shell is an integral part of the bicycle frame. This is typical of modern frame designs, and different from the much older designs that gave the bottom bracket its name. In those designs - now obsolete - the bottom bracket was a separate piece bolted onto the frame.

The bottom bracket on a bicycle connects the crankset (chainset) to the bicycle and allows the crankset to rotate freely. It contains a spindle to which the crankset attaches, and the bearings that allow the spindle and crankset to rotate. The chainrings and pedals attach to the cranks. Bottom bracket bearings fit inside the bottom bracket shell, which connects the seat tube, down tube and chain stays as part of the bicycle frame.

The term "bottom bracket" appeared around the 1890s, when some bicycle designs included "brackets" bolted to the bottom of the frame, which held the bearings and the pedal spindle. In America, similar brackets were often called "hangers" because of the way they hung from the bottom of the frame. Later, the "bracket" was thought to refer to the tube fittings that are used to hold frame tubes together in lugged steel frames which also form the shell that contains the spindle and bearings. The term "bottom bracket" is now used for the bearing-spindle component of all frame types, regardless of construction details.

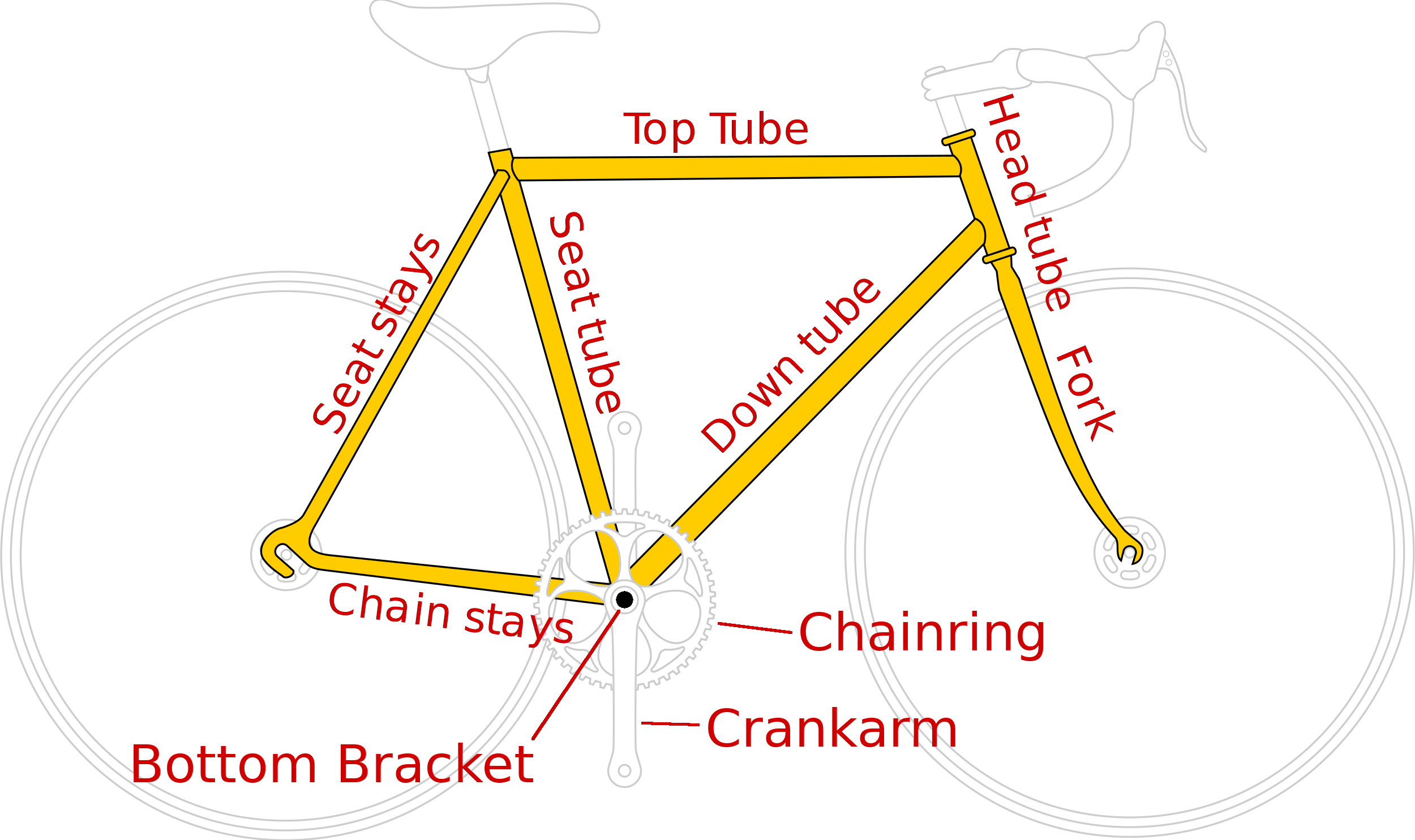
Parts of a typical bicycle, including bottom bracket, crankarms, and chainring

There is some disagreement as to whether the word axle or spindle should be used in particular contexts. The distinction is based on whether the unit is stationary, as in a hub, or rotates, as in a bottom bracket. American bicycle mechanic and author Sheldon Brown uses axle once and spindle four times in his bottom bracket glossary entry. This article uses spindle throughout for consistency.

Bottom bracket assemblies are available in several types, and can be split into whether they are assembled and disassembled with screw threads or whether they are pressed into the bottom bracket. Since the 2000s and especially the 2010s, a lack of standardization, or rather the constant introduction of new standards that disappear after relatively short periods, has been described as a complex topic to deal with for those who want to buy bicycle components or maintain bicycles. Many bicycle brands have introduced their own dimensions for bottom bracket bearings, and the different use of terminology by the various manufacturers has been described as confusing.

== Bottom bracket types ==
=== Three-piece ===
In typical modern utility bikes, the spindle is separate from the cranks. This is known as a three-piece crankset (spindle, left crank-arm and right crank-arm). The cranks attach to the spindle via a common square taper, cotter, or splined interface.

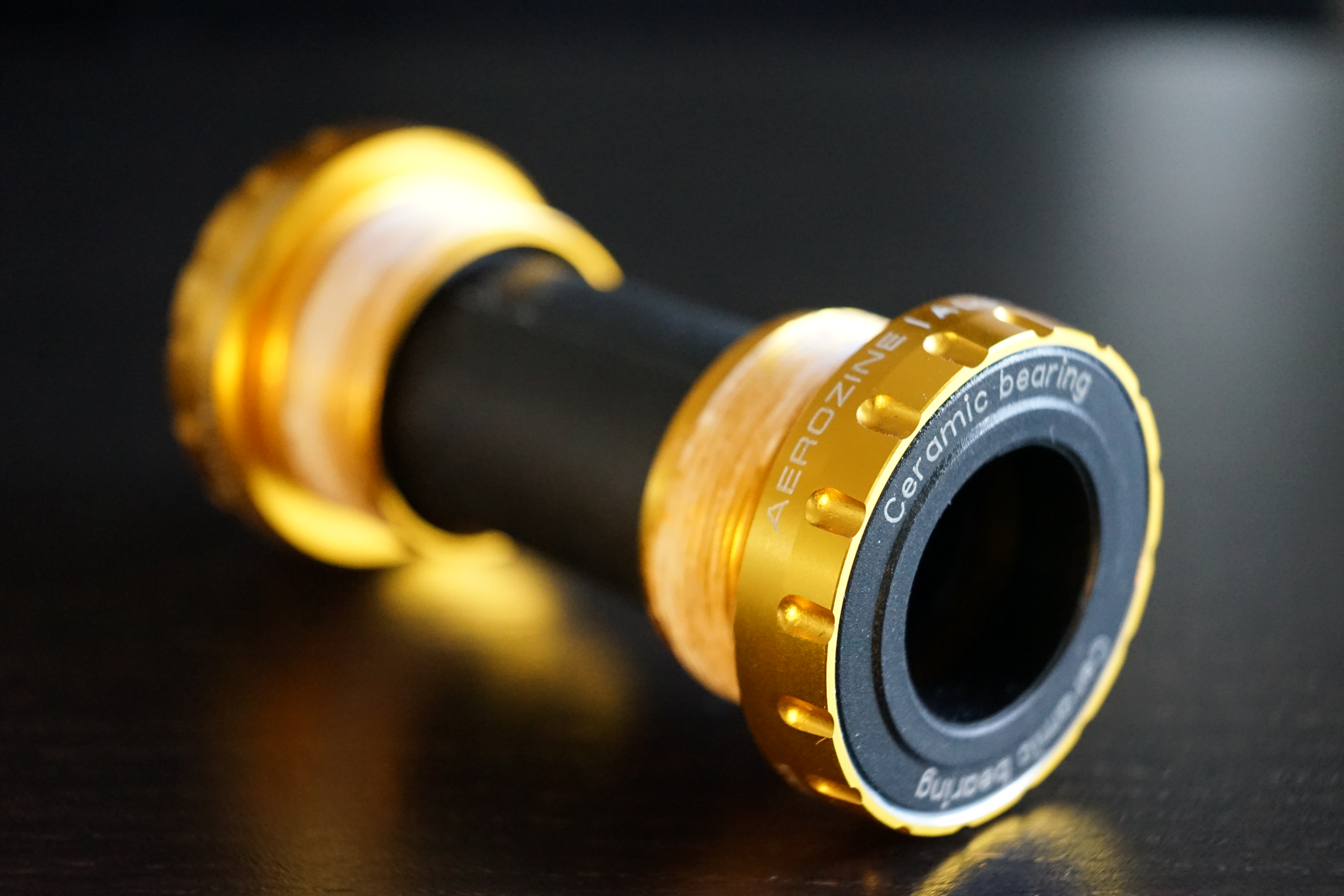
Aerozine ceramic external bottom bracket bearing cups for BSC/ISO standard, that is M34.798×1.058 mm (1.37″-24 TPI) threads and a 68 mm wide bottom bracket shell

==== Loose bearing (adjustable cup and cone) ====
Earlier three-piece cranks consist of a spindle incorporating bearing cones (facing out), a fixed cup on the drive side (with a cone), an adjustable cup on the non-drive side (also with a cone), and loose bearing balls (or held by a cage). Overhauling requires removing at least one cup, cleaning the cups, cleaning or (more usually) replacing the bearing balls, reinstalling the spindle, and adjusting the cups. The design is nowadays mostly found on affordable bikes due to its simple and affordable design, and is also an easily serviceable design.

==== Bayliss Wiley unit bottom bracket ====
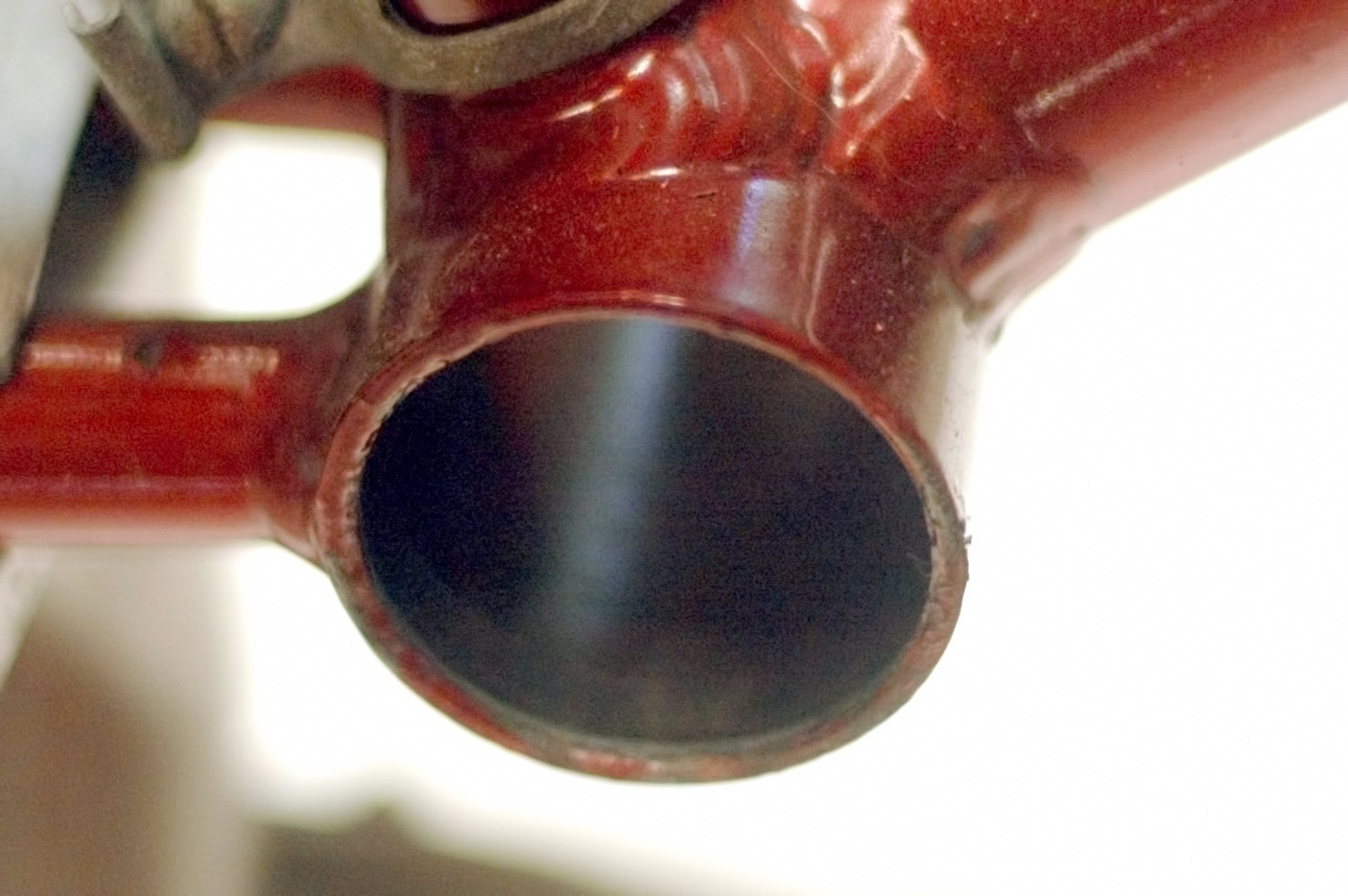
Plain (threadless) bottom bracket shell of Royal Enfield Revelation houses Bayliss Wiley unit bottom bracket

The Bayliss Wiley unit bottom bracket is a self-contained unit that fits into a plain, slightly larger-than-usual bottom bracket in a bicycle frame. It comprises a standard spindle and bearings in a steel cylinder with a slightly-modified bearing cup at each end. The cylinder, bearing, and spindle are placed in the shell and held in place by the bearing cups, each of which has a narrow flange that bears against the edge of the shell.

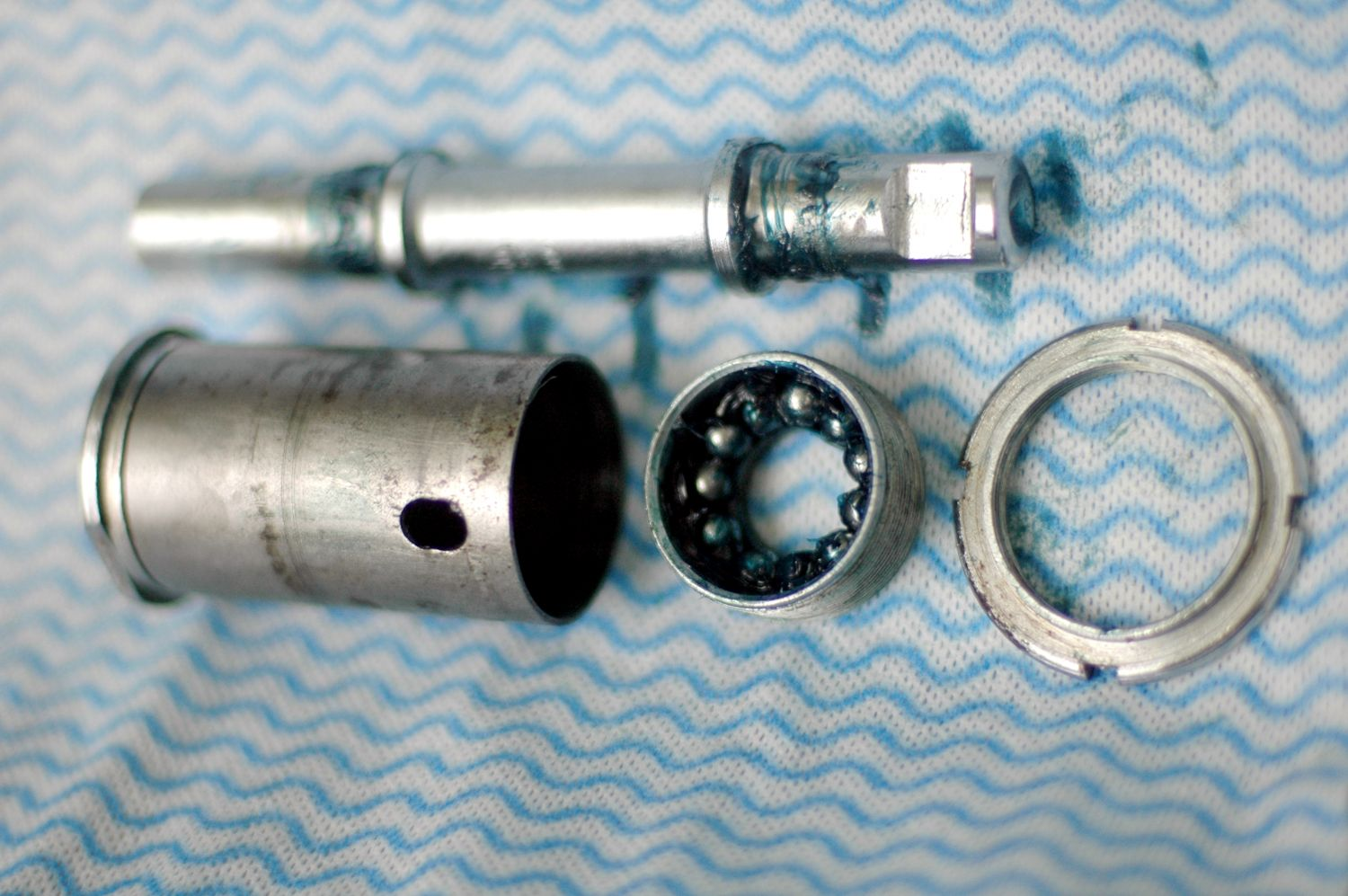
Bayliss Wiley unit bottom bracket

The Bayliss-Wiley Unit Bottom Bracket was introduced in the mid-1940s. It was fitted to various English lightweights through the 1950s and was used by Royal Enfield on its 'Revelation' small wheeler in the mid-1960s. However, the unit bottom bracket was never popular and it had a reputation for being troublesome. A lack of positive location allowed it to rotate within the frame, loosening the bearing cups. Contemporary users overcome the problem by fixing the unit in the frame using adhesive or a screw.

==== Cartridge bearing ====
Many modern bicycles use what is called a "cartridge" bottom bracket instead. "Cartridge" here refers to the bottom bracket unit being a pre-mounted assembly containing the spindle (or axle) as well as its bearings, as opposed to them being separate parts which must be mounted separately. Cartridge hence refers to the functional assembly unit, and does not indicate what type of bearings the cartridge utilizes. Either loose ball bearings (adjustable cup and cones), sealed bearings or other types of bearings may be used in a cartridge assembly. Independent of the type of bearing used, the cartridge often has some sealing to protect the assembly from the environment.

Sealed cartridge bottom brackets are normally two pieces, a unit holding the spindle and bearings that screws into the bottom bracket from the drive side and a screw-in support cup (often made of light alloy or plastic) that supports the spindle and bearing assembly on the non-drive side. Other designs are three piece, the spindle is separate, but the bearing cups incorporate cheaply replaceable pairs of standard industrial sealed bearings. Either arrangement makes servicing the bottom bracket a simple matter of removing the old cartridge from the bottom bracket shell, and installing a new one in its place. Cartridge bottom brackets generally have seals to prevent the ingress of water and dirt. The early Shimano LP bottom brackets from the 1990s had the support cup on the drive side and used loose bearings inside; they could be dismantled and serviced much like adjustable cup and cone bearings.

In general use, the term 'three piece' refers to the former design, with sealed bottom brackets being seen as the 'standard'. Designs utilizing separate bearings are usually found on low end bikes, due to the low cost.

=== One-piece (Ashtabula) ===
With a one-piece (also called Ashtabula) crank and bottom bracket, the spindle and crank arms are a single piece. The bottom bracket is large to accommodate removal of this S-shaped crank. Bearing cups are pressed into the bottom bracket. The crank holds the cones facing in; adjustment is made via the left-threaded non-drive side cone.

One-piece cranks are easily maintained and reliable, but heavy. They are found on BMX bikes as well as children's bicycles and low-end road and mountain bikes. They fit only frames with American sized (also known as "Pro size") bottom brackets.

The bearings are normally open to the elements and easily contaminated, although this rarely causes failure. Ball retainers (caged bearings) are used to facilitate assembly and to reduce the number of balls required.

=== Thompson ===
The Thompson bottom bracket uses adjustable spindle cones and cups pressed into the bottom bracket like the Ashtabula bottom bracket. Unlike the Ashtabula crank, the non-drive side crank is removable, allowing for a smaller bottom bracket. Frames with either Italian or English bottom bracket diameters (independent of threading) may be fitted with Thompson bottom brackets.

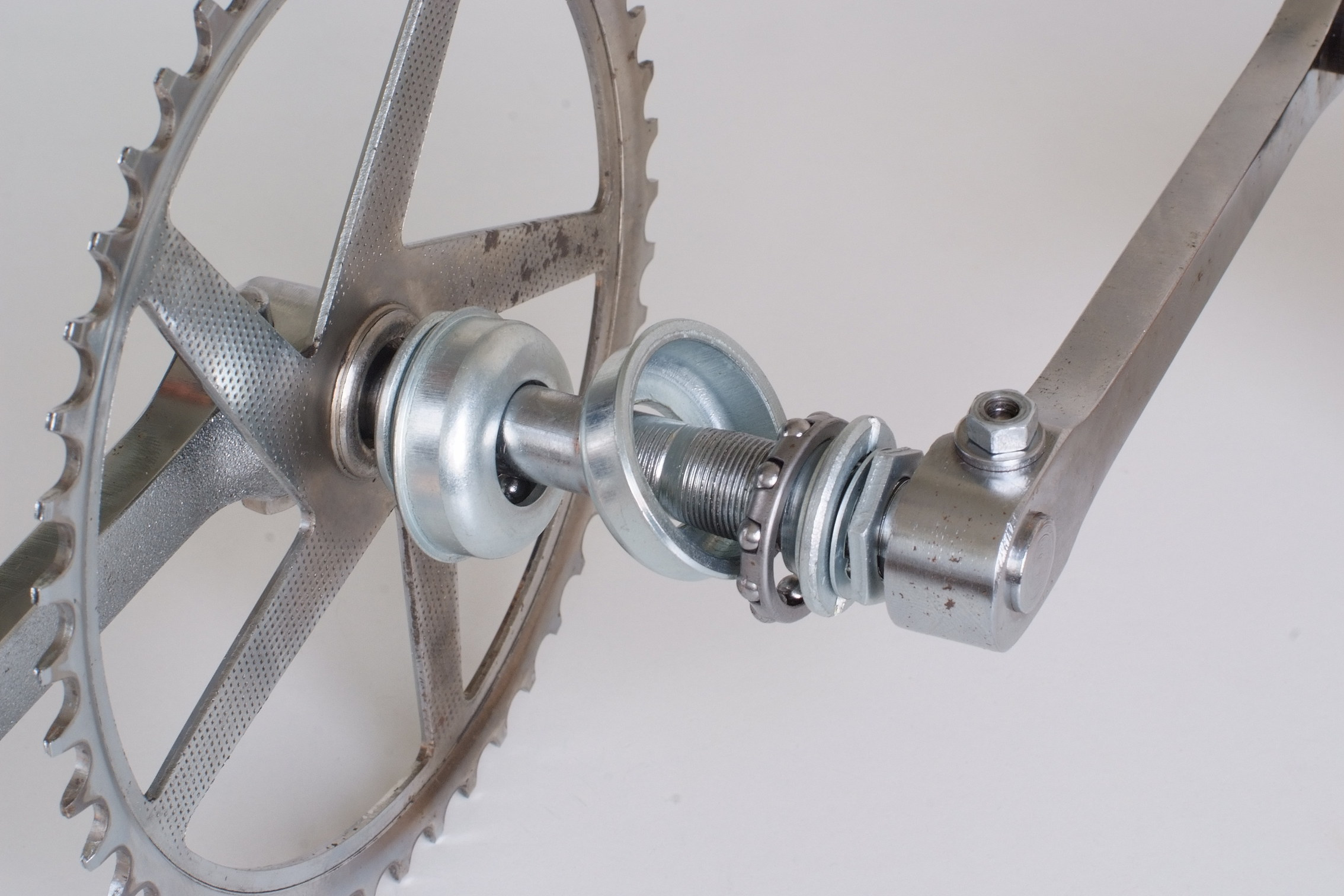
Thompson bottom bracket

Thompson bottom brackets are rare. The design is similar to a typical hub bearing and theoretically supports the load better but is hard to seal effectively against dirt and water.

=== External bearings ===
Since around the late 2000s, several designs with integrated bottom brackets with outboard bearings have emerged. The sales pitch of these systems have been to enable reduced weight and increased stiffness compared to internal bottom brackets. Because of the relatively small 1.37″ (34.9 mm for ISO, or 36 mm for shells threaded to the Italian standard) diameter shell, designs that place the bearings inside the shell can either have large bearings and a thinner spindle, which lacks stiffness, or smaller bearings and a thicker spindle (such as the original Shimano Octalink), which lacks durability. External bearings allow for a large diameter (hence stiff) and hollow (hence light) spindle. They also offer more distance between the two bearing surfaces, which contributes to stiffness while allowing lighter components (but also may increase the Q factor).

A different approach than to move to threaded external bearings could be to standardize on one of the larger diameter press-fit BMX shell standards for all bicycles, or the press-fit BB30 standard originally introduced by Cannondale.

Several implementations of external bearings have been brought to market.

==== X-type and Hollowtech II ====
In one design, the driveside (right) crankarm and the bottom bracket spindle are an integrated unit and the bearing cups are placed outside of the bottom bracket shell, threaded into the bottom bracket shell. There are a number of versions of this design available: Shimano's Hollowtech II, RaceFace's X-type, FSA's MegaExo. The terms 'X-Type' and 'Hollowtech II' are both used to refer to any design of this type, but are in fact trademarks of the corporations marketing the systems. These external bearings are compatible with those from other manufacturers. With this new standard have come several cranksets designed to use the external bearings of other manufacturers, such as DMR's "Ex type" and Charge Bikes "Regular" cranks.

In the early 1990s at Magic Motorcycle, a small USA component manufacturer later purchased by Cannondale, and re-formed into Cannondale's CODA brand (Coda Magic 900 cranks), made a proprietary external bearing bottom bracket, oversized spindle and crank system. The design resembles the external bottom bracket designs marketed by FSA, RaceFace and Shimano. The modern versions used the same sealed bearing size (6805-RS, 25 mm inner diameter, 37 mm outer diameter) and the original mounting tool fits. The crank had intricately CNC machined wide hollow crank arms made of two halves glued together. However, Cannondale moved on from that system and developed the SI cranks and the new BB30 unthreaded press-fit bottom bracket standard. BB30 requires special frames which have a 42 mm diameter unthreaded bottom bracket shell (which is larger than the 34.9 mm threaded ISO standard threads) allowing use of internal sealed bearings while their top level SI crankarms are still two machined aluminum halves glued together.

Another precursor of the current external bearings/through spindle design was developed by Sweet Parts, a micro-manufacturer of high end cranks and stems. Their Sweet Wings cranks from the early 1990s incorporated the through spindle concept by attaching the two half pipes coming off each crank arm and held together with a single bolt that resided within the cavity of the spindle itself. Their bottom bracket bearing arrangement was a hybrid internal/external bottom bracket, with the right-side bearing being internal inside the bottom bracket shell, and the left-side bearing being external (and having the 6805-RS sealed bearing, too).

==== Giga-X-Pipe ====
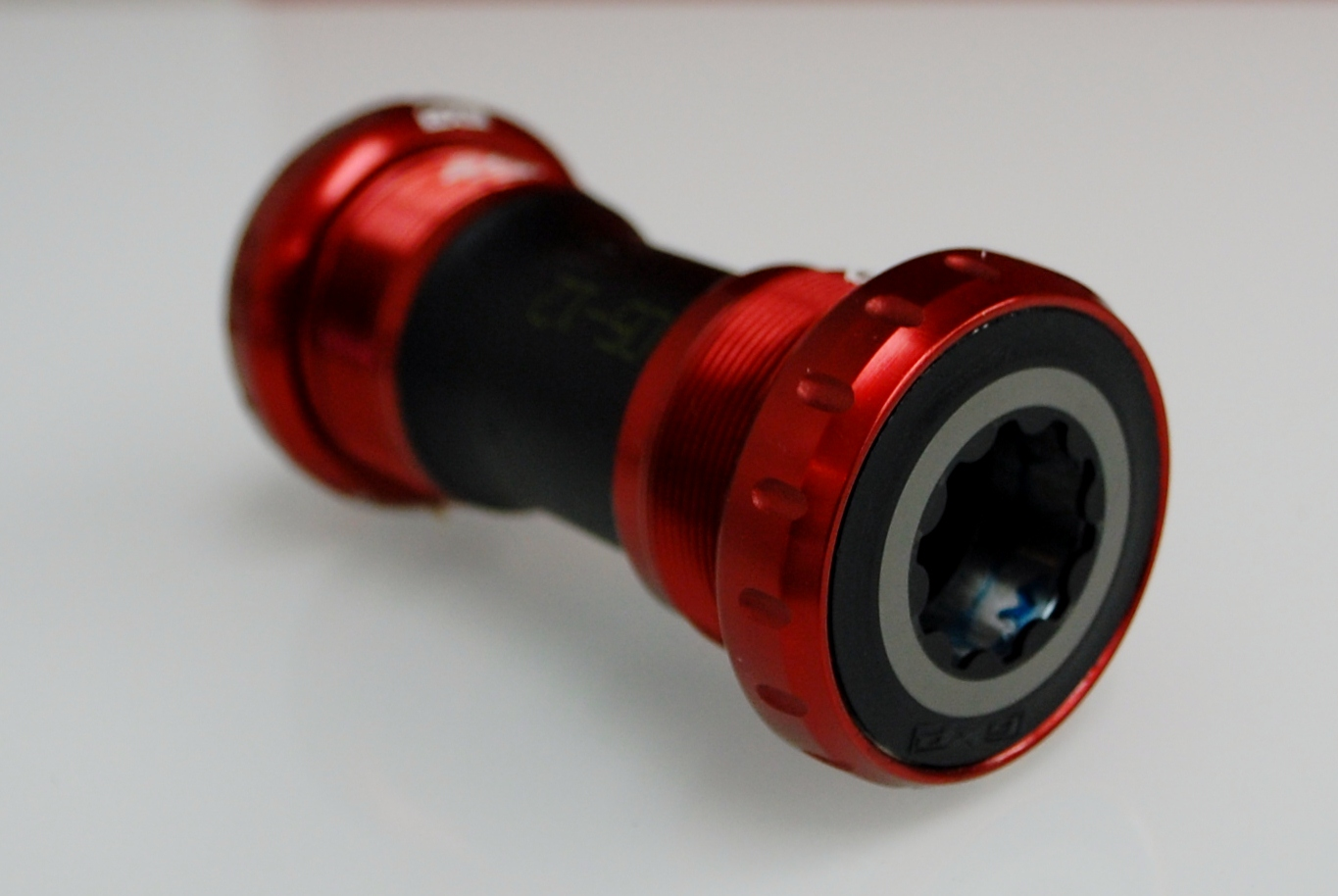
A SRAM GIGA-X-Pipe bottom bracket.

Giga-X-Pipe was Truvativ's (later bought by SRAM in 2004) approach, and is an evolution of the ISIS Drive bottom bracket, but with a longer spindle and the bearings outside the bottom bracket shell. The spindle is permanently pressed into the right crank. The left side spline interface looks similar, but is different so as to prevent installation of older ISIS Drive crankarms—which are no longer compatible because Q-factor and chain line cannot be maintained using these older cranks with an external bearing bottom bracket. Truvativ refer to this design as 'Giga-X-Pipe' or 'GXP.' They also make a heavier duty external bearing bottom bracket called 'Howitzer.' The Howitzer BB is more like a traditional bottom bracket in that the spindle is not permanently pressed into the right crank. Again, the Howitzer spline looks similar to the ISIS Drive standard spline but is actually different, so as to prevent the usage of ISIS Drive cranks on the external bearing bottom bracket, which would affect chainline and Q-factor.

==== Ultra-Torque ====
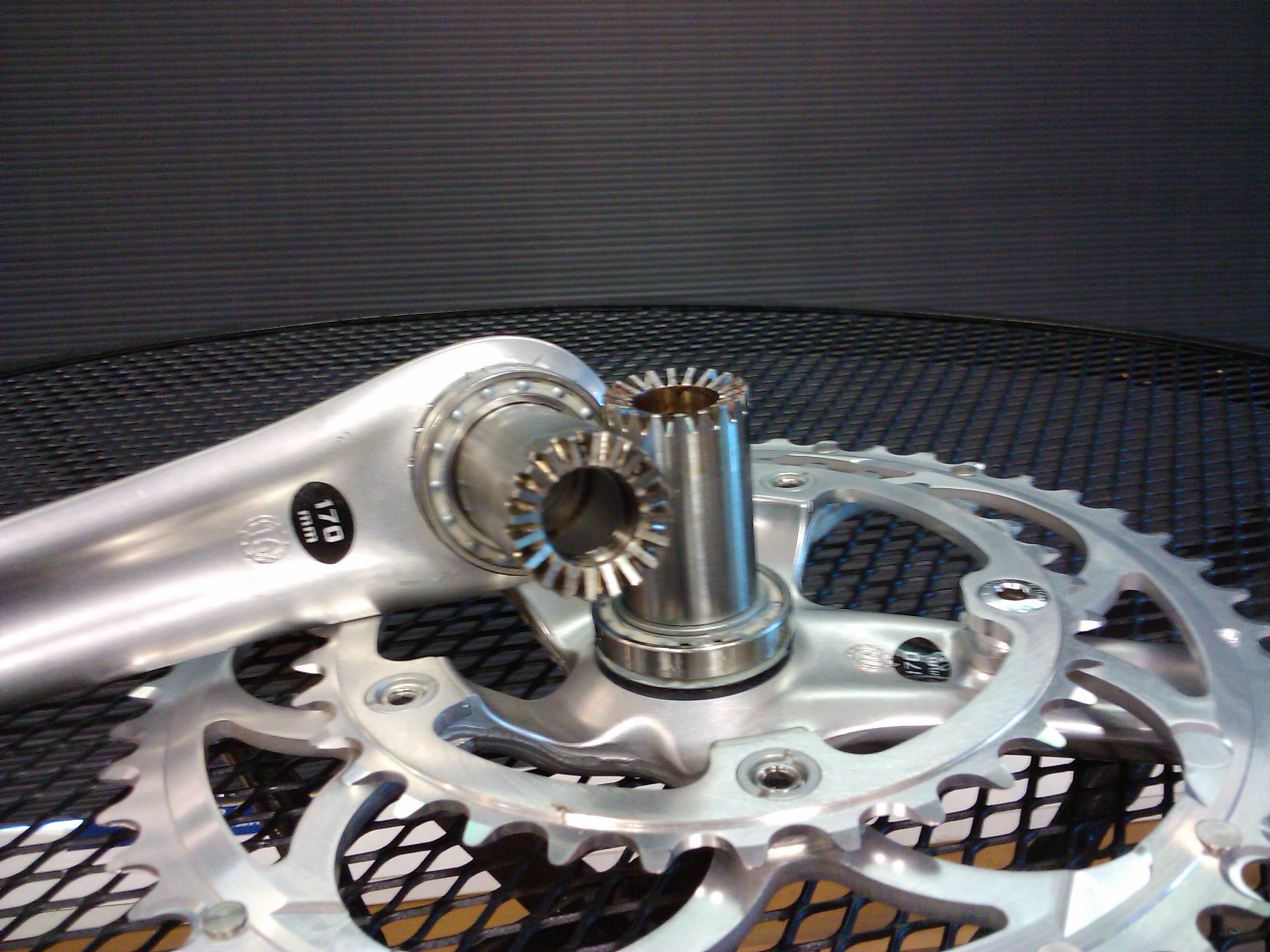
Hirth joint between the semi-axles of a Campagnolo Ultra-Torque crankset

In late 2006, Campagnolo introduced an outboard bearing design called Ultra-Torque, which has both crank arms permanently attached to halves of the spindle (called semi-axles), which then join in the middle of the bottom bracket with a Hirth joint and a bolt.

==== Pressed bearing standards ====
Bicycle frames utilizing pressed bearing standards do not have any threads inside the bottom bracket shell. The bottom bracket is pressed directly into the frame. Using pressed in standards allows frame manufacturers greater flexibility in the frame design, and can offer greater stiffness and reduced mass.

A disadvantage is that assembly and disassembly of press-fit bottom bracket bearings require expensive special equipment. Some hobby-mechanics assemble and disassemble themselves using simple hand-tools, but there is a certain risk that the frame may become damaged. Another disadvantage is that many users report that they start to creak after a certain time. A third disadvantage is that there has become a wealth of competing and incompatible press-fit bottom bracket standards introduced by various bicycle manufacturers.

The current pressed-bearing standards (and the manufacturers who developed them) are:

- BB30 (Cannondale)
- PF30 (SRAM)
- BB90 and BB95 (Trek)
- BB86 and BB92 (Shimano)
- BB79 (Cervelo's BBRight)
- BB386EVO (FSA and BH Bicycles)

In the BB30 (Cannondale), BB90 and BB95 (Trek) systems, the bearings are pressed directly into the frame. For PF30 (SRAM), BB86 and BB92 (Shimano), BB79 (Cervelo), and BB386EVO (FSA) the bearing is housed in a nylon plastic cup that is pressed into the frame’s bottom bracket shell. Pressed-in standards usually require two-piece cranksets where the spindle is attached to one of the crankarms, or at least a spindle which can be threaded through after the bearings have been mounted. Due to fixed spindle length and diameter, cranksets designed for one pressed standard may not be compatible with another. For example, a crankset made specifically for BB30 will not fit in a BB86 bottom bracket and frame. There are other instances where third-party adapters can be used to fit a crankset made for one standard into another. For example, a Shimano (two-piece Hollowtech II 24 mm outer diameter spindle) road crankset can fit into a BB30 bottom bracket shell (42 mm inner diameter) using aftermarket adapters.

=== T47 ===
T47 is a size for bottom-brackets in 47mm with threads. This will account for enough room for an oversized axle, while also having enough room for big ball bearings, this in comparison to the traditional BSA in 34.6mm. A bottom-bracket made for 46mm pressfit can be threaded up to a fit for a 47mm bottom-bracket and will have approximately a 46mm inside diameter. The T47 standard had a shell width of 68mm. The T47a has a width of 77mm. The T47i has a width of 86.5mm.

=== Other ===
Lightning Cycle Dynamics, Inc. offers a carbon crank bottom bracket assembly with semi-axles that connect in the middle via a hirth-like joint to form the spindle.

Schlumpf makes a bottom bracket that incorporates a two-speed epicyclic transmission.

== Interface between spindle and crankset ==
As well as the different means to fit the bottom bracket into the frame, there are a number of ways of connecting the crank arms to the bottom bracket spindle. Shimano introduced a proprietary splined interface named "Octalink". Several other manufacturers (King Cycle Group, Truvativ, and Race Face) created an "open" standard called "ISIS Drive" or simply "ISIS", for International Splined Interface Standard.

=== Cottered ===
One of the earliest standards of crank interface, 'cottered cranks are now considered obsolete in developed countries, but are still in common use in developing nations. The spindle is a cylinder and has a flat region across it (a land). The crank has a hole through it to fit onto the spindle, with a transverse hole for the cotter pin. The cotter pin is cylindrical with one side flattened at an angle to form a wedge to match the spindle land. When tightened, this produces a simple and effective interface. The problem is that normally the interface cannot be tightened enough without a cotter pin press, a highly specialized type of clamping tool, though still produced and for sale. Cotters can also be installed with an improvised tool designed for another purpose, such as a ball joint splitter or hammer, with mixed results.

All the load is on one very small area of the cotter pin and the crank land, the cotter pin deforms plastically under normal use and must therefore be replaced regularly. If this is not done the crank and the spindle wear and must be replaced. The rider will get a warning through a characteristic creak sound that aging pins cause the cranks to make.

=== Square taper ===
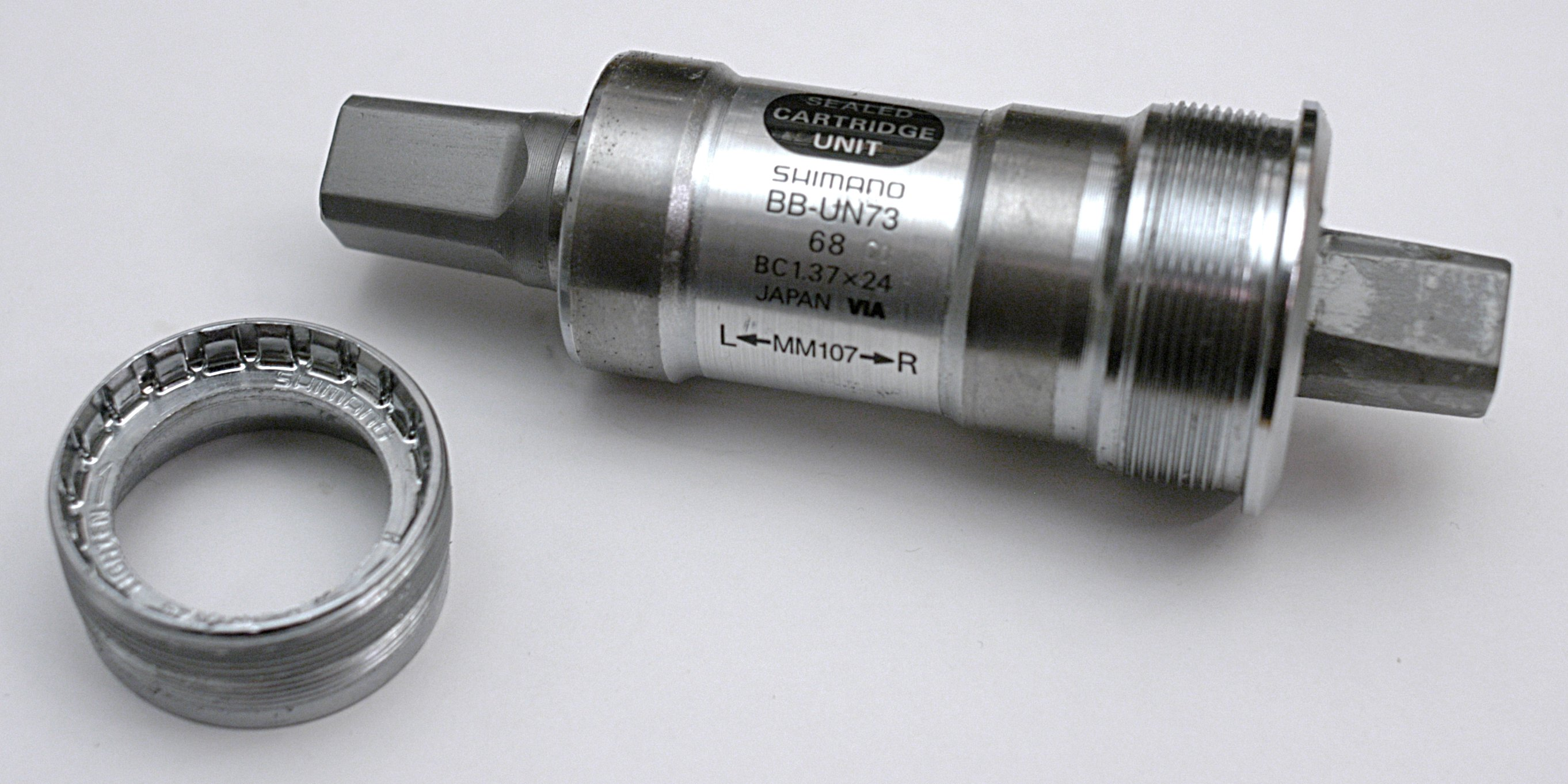
A square-taper bottom bracket cartridge.

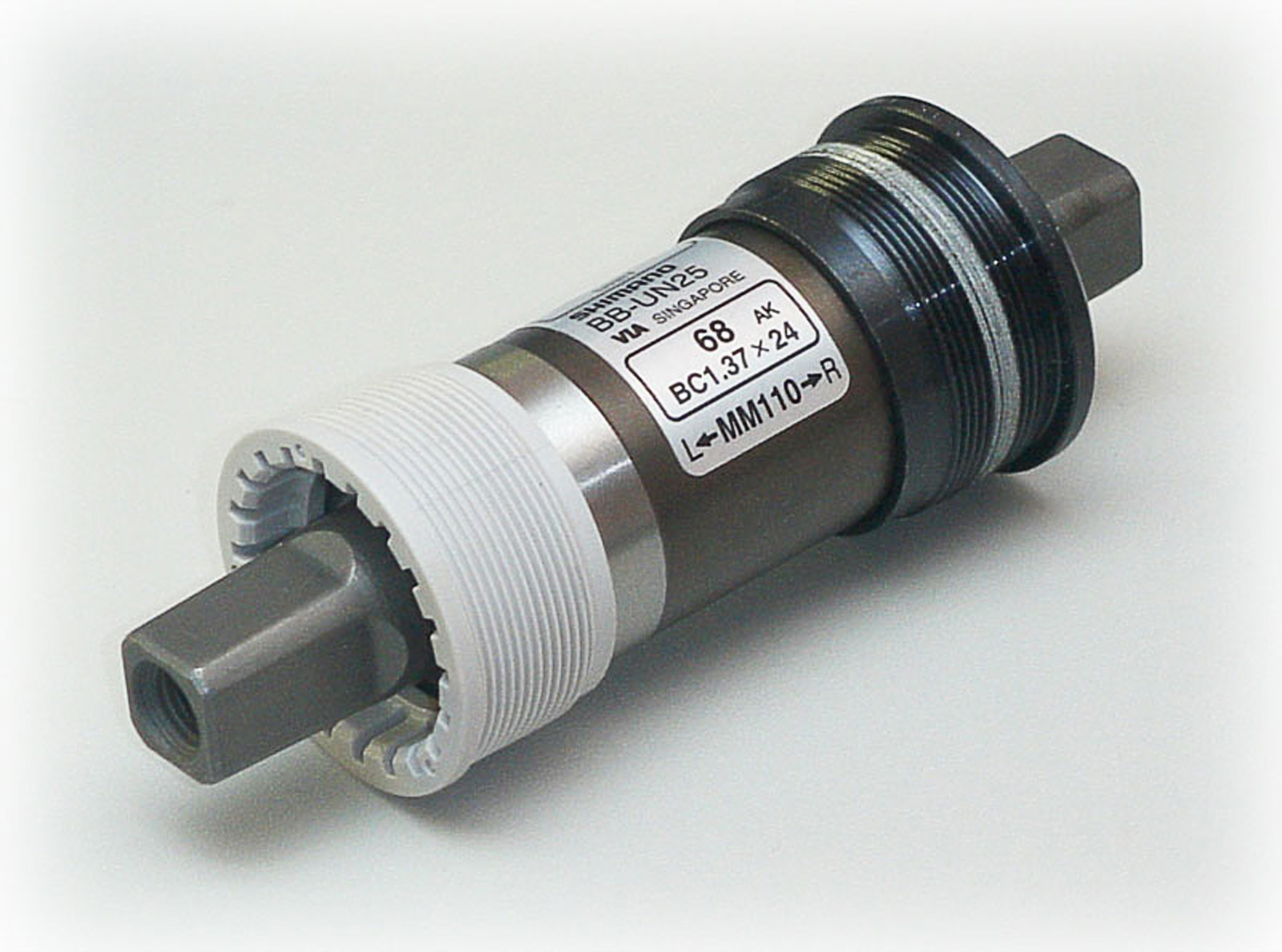
A Shimano UN25 Square Taper Bottom Bracket cartridge before fitting

Previously referred to as 'cotterless', since this was the design that was introduced after cottered spindles, square taper was once the most popular (and only) style 'cotterless' crank. This interface consists of a spindle with square tapered ends that fit into square tapered holes in each crank. It is still manufactured in great numbers for bicycles and maintains popularity for such applications as bicycles.

Not all square taper crank and bottom bracket combinations are compatible. Although nearly all spindles use a 2-degree taper, there are two competing standards, defined by the measurement across the flat at the end of the spindle. The JIS size is used by Shimano and most other Asian manufacturers. The ISO size is primarily used by Campagnolo and other European manufacturers, in addition to cranks that adhere to the Nihon Jitensha Shinkokai (NJS) keirin standards (Sugino 75). Some manufacturers make cranks and bottom brackets to both specifications.

Some square tapered bottom bracket axles are threaded at the ends and use nuts. Other square tapered bottom brackets are hollow, allowing for crank bolts to thread into the ends.

Titanium has been used in an effort to make bottom brackets lighter, but early attempts were not entirely successful. Several manufacturers have built bottom brackets with titanium spindles and alloy cups but their durability was lower than that of steel. Early Campagnolo Super Record titanium spindles (which were hollow) were replaced by a later version that used solid, nutted spindles for improved reliability.

In recent years Shimano has migrated much of their product line away from square taper to a spline attachment called Octalink and to external bearing types. In late 2006, Campagnolo announced that it was abandoning the square taper interface for double chainsets in favor of an outboard bearing design called Ultra-Torque, which uses a splined interface between spindle halves.

=== Splined ===
Several different competing standards for splined interfaces exist. The tool drive for installing and removing these bottom brackets is often also a spline, instead of drives for regular hand tools.

==== Octalink ====
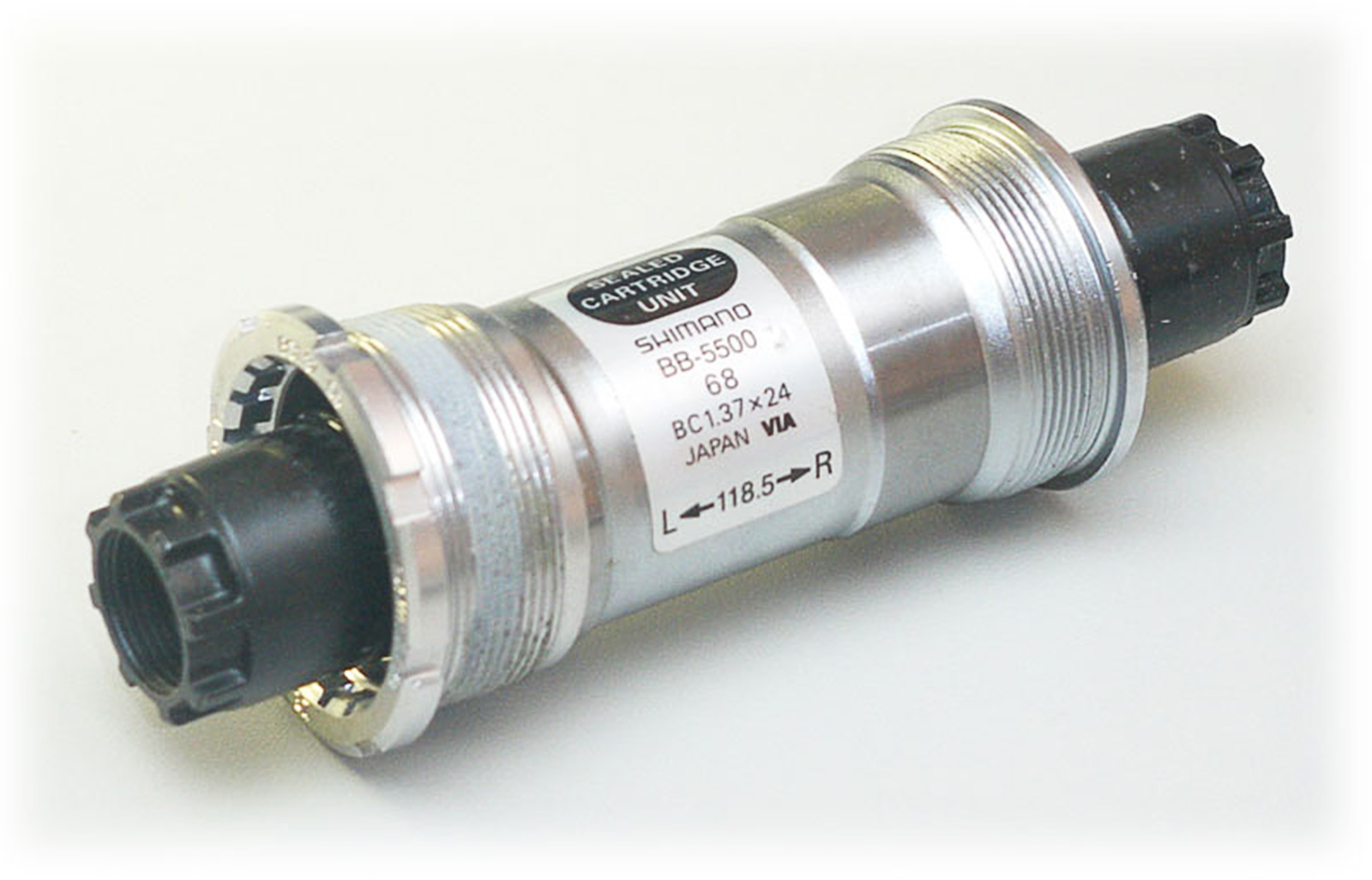
A Shimano Octalink v1 Bottom Bracket before fitting

The Octalink system uses a spindle with eight splines. The splines provide a contact area between crank and spindle for an interface. Octalink exists in the marketplace in two variants Octalink v1 and Octalink v2, and the two are not compatible with each other. The difference between the two can be seen by the depth of mounting grooves on the bottom bracket spindle. v1 spline grooves are 5 mm long, while v2 grooves are 9 mm long. Shimano 105, Ultegra 6500 and Dura Ace 7700 cranksets mate to v1 spindles, while later mountain bike designs use the deeper-grooved v2. The system is proprietary and protected by Shimano patents and license fees.

==== ISIS Drive ====
ISIS Drive, the International Splined Interface Standard, is a non-proprietary splined specification for the interface between a bicycle crankset and the bottom bracket spindle. It was created by King Cycle Group, Truvativ, and Race Face. ISIS Drive is open source and free to the public to be used as seen fit.

==== Other designs ====
BMX 3-Piece bottom brackets typically use a spindle either 19 mm or 19.05 mm (3/4″), 22 mm or 22.2 mm (7/8″), or 24 mm in diameter. The majority of newer or Asian parts are made to metric round numbers, and mixes of metric and non-metric (e.g. 19 mm and 19.05 mm) spindles and bearings may not be compatible, and can result in stuck parts. In some cases, the spindles are splined and the number of splines depends on the manufacturer/model of the crankset, or in other cases, the spindle is specific to the crankset.

There are other designs in use that have varying degrees of popularity. One is Truvativ's PowerSpline interface. It is a 12-spline spindle proprietary to Truvativ offered as a lower cost alternative to other spline designs. It is essentially a beefed-up square taper spindle with splines instead of tapers.

Phil Wood uses a similar splined design to the Shimano bottom bracket. The difference is an 18-tooth versus a 20-tooth as per the Shimano design.

== Bottom bracket shell sizes ==
Bottom brackets have several key size parameters: spindle length, shell width, and shell diameter.

=== Shell width and spindle length ===
There are a few standard shell widths (68, 70, 73, 83, or 100 mm [2.7, 2.8, 2.9, 3.3, or 3.9 in]). Road bikes usually use 68 mm (2.7 in); Italian road bikes use 70 mm (2.8 in); Early model mountain bikes use 73 mm (2.9 in). Later models (1995 and newer) use 68 mm (2.7 in) more commonly. Some downhill bikes even use an 83 mm (3.3 in) bottom bracket shell. Snow bikes use a 100 mm (3.9 in) shell.

Spindles come in a wider range of lengths (102–140 mm [4.0–5.5 in]), and are sized to match not only the shell width but also the type of crankset it will support (longer for triple, shorter for single, etc.). Spindle length, along with the crank's shape, determines the Q factor or tread.

=== Shell diameters and threading ===
There are a few standard shell diameters (34.798–36 mm [1.3700–1.4173 in]) with associated thread pitches around 1 mm (24–28 TPI).

Most (except for Italian and French) designs use right-hand (normal) threading for the left side and left-hand (reverse) threading for the right (drive) side. This is opposite of most pedal threading and is done for the same reason: to keep the bottom bracket cup from backing out of the bottom bracket shell due to precession. These have become rare to encounter on newer bikes. As of 2015, bikes with French bottom brackets were very rare to encounter, but there was still some aftermarket support for components. According to an article by Parktool from 2019, the French threading standard is "considered obsolete". As of 2017, bikes with Italian bottom brackets were also rare to encounter, but aftermarket Italian bottom brackets were nonetheless still well-supported by many component manufacturers, including top-end kits from Shimano and Campagnolo.

With the development of external bearing designs, the standard shell diameter has become a considerable constraint, limiting both the diameter of the bottom bracket spindle and the size of the actual bearing balls in the races. Consequently, these external bearing designs can be less durable than older internal bearing designs. To address this problem several designers have promoted new standards for larger diameter bottom bracket shells, the best known of which is BB30 promoted by Cannondale. The name BB30 refers to the 30 mm (1.2 in) diameter of the spindle, not of the shell. Most of these larger diameter designs are using bearings that are pressed in. Since about 2015 there is now a T47 standard with a larger shell diameter and also threading. Some manufacturers (like Trek) are starting to implement this into their bicycles, while it is also possible to have threading cut into an existing 46 mm pressfit and have T47 cups fit in there.

Bottom bracket thread name	Nominal thread description	Thread orientation	Cup outside diameter	Shell width	Shell inside diameter
ISO/English or BSC or BSA, Euro (BMX)	M34.798×1.058 mm (1.37″-24 TPI)	Left-hand thread on drive side	34.6–34.9 mm (1.36–1.37 in)	68 mm (2.7 in); 73 mm (2.9 in) (oversize); 83 mm (3.3 in) (some downhill and freeride bikes); 100 mm (3.9 in) (fatbikes)	33.6–33.9 mm (1.32–1.33 in)
Italian (uncommon, but available per 2015)	M36×1.058 mm 1.42″-24 TPI	Right-hand thread on both sides	35.6–35.9 mm (1.40–1.41 in)	70 mm (2.8 in)	34.6–34.9 mm (1.36–1.37 in)
French (very uncommon, but available per 2015)	M35×1 mm (1.38″-25.4 TPI)	Right-hand thread on both sides	34.6–34.9 mm (1.36–1.37 in)	68 mm (2.7 in)	33.6–33.9 mm (1.32–1.33 in)
Swiss (uncommon)	M35×1 mm (1.38″-25.4 TPI)	Left-hand thread on drive side	34.6–34.9 mm (1.36–1.37 in)	68 mm (2.7 in)	33.6–33.9 mm (1.32–1.33 in)
ISIS Overdrive	M48×1.5 mm (1.89″-16.93 TPI)	Left-hand thread on drive side		68 mm (2.7 in)	46.5 mm (1.83 in)
Chater-Lea (uncommon/older vintage)	M36.83×0.977 mm (1.45-26 TPI)	Left-hand thread on drive side	Oversized	64 mm (2.5 in)	~35.8 mm (1.41 in)
Whitworth (Raleigh 3-speeds + Raleigh road frames except Super Course)	M34.925×0.977 mm (1-3/8″-26 TPI)	Left-hand thread on drive side	34.6–34.9 mm (1.36–1.37 in)	71 mm (2.8 in); 76 mm (3.0 in)	33.6–33.9 mm (1.32–1.33 in)
Ashtabula (one-piece crank, OPC) or American (BMX)	51 mm press fit, not threaded	Male threads on crank: 1.058 mm (24 TPI) on most, 0.907 mm (28 TPI) on Schwinn and Mongoose	No cups	68 mm (2.7 in)	51.3 mm (2.02 in) or 51.5 mm (2.03 in)
Fauber (one-piece crank, OPC)	45 mm press fit, not threaded	Male threads on crank		68 mm (2.7 in)	45 mm (1.8 in)
Raleigh	M34.925×0.977 mm (1-3/8″-26 TPI)	Left-hand thread on drive side	34.6–34.9 mm (1.36–1.37 in)		33.6–33.9 mm (1.32–1.33 in)
BB30 (Cannondale)	Press fit, not threaded	Threads on crank spindle	No cups	68 mm (2.7 in) (road); 73 mm (2.9 in) (MTB)	42 mm (1.7 in)
PressFit 30 (SRAM)	Press fit, not threaded	Threads on crank spindle	46 mm (1.8 in) composite cups	68 mm (2.7 in) (road); 73 mm (2.9 in) (MTB)	46 mm (1.8 in)
BBright (BB79)	Press fit, not threaded	Threads on crank spindle	46 mm (1.8 in) composite cups	79 mm (3.1 in)	46 mm (1.8 in)
Shimano Press Fit (BB86)	Press fit, not threaded	Threads on crank spindle	41 mm (1.6 in) composite cups	86.5 mm (3.41 in) (road); 89.5 mm (3.52 in); 92 mm (3.6 in) (MTB)	41 mm (1.6 in)
BB386EVO	Press fit, not threaded	Threads on crank spindle	46 mm (1.8 in) composite cups	86.5 mm (3.41 in)	46 mm (1.8 in)
Spanish (BMX)	37 mm press fit, not threaded (19 mm or 22 mm spindle)	Threads on crank spindle	No cups	68 mm (2.7 in)	37 mm (1.5 in)
Mid (BMX)	41 mm press fit, not threaded	Threads on crank spindle	No cups	68 mm (2.7 in)	41.2 mm (1.62 in)
T47	M47×1 mm (1.85″-25.4 TPI)	Left-hand thread on drive side		68 mm (2.7 in)	46 mm (1.8 in)

== Bottom bracket height ==
The bottom bracket height is the vertical distance from the center of the bottom bracket to the ground, and it expresses clearance of the frame over obstacles. The height of the bottom bracket is of concern when designing the frame. The height of the bottom bracket is the baseline for the rider's height while riding. Combined with the length of the cranks, it determines the bicycle's ground clearance.

A higher bottom bracket is useful for mountain bikes. In a fixed-gear bicycle, the bottom bracket should be high enough to prevent the pedals from coming in contact with the ground while cornering but is not always achieved.

A lower bottom bracket creates a lower center of gravity and allows for a larger frame without creating an uncomfortable standover height.

== Eccentric bottom brackets ==
An eccentric is a cylindrical plug or bearing cup that fits into an enlarged bottom bracket shell. The plug is machined to accept a typical bottom bracket, but offset from the center of the plug, so that by rotating the plug, the location of the bottom bracket (and hence the chain tension) may be adjusted (fore and aft to tension the chain, the upper or lower eccentric position for a given chain length can be chosen to fine tune bottom bracket height). Once properly adjusted the plug is then fixed in place by a pair of set screws, a clamping bottom bracket shell, an expanding wedge in the plug, or the plug may be manufactured in left and right halves that clamp against the faces of the bottom bracket shell with screws that connect the two halves.

Eccentric bottom bracket shell inner diameters vary between manufacturers from 42mm-55mm (nominally).

Eccentrics are used in applications that require precise chain tension adjustment such as the timing chain of tandem bicycles, the chain that connects the stoker's and captain's cranks. They may also be employed on bicycles that do not have an adjustable rear wheel position, due to vertical dropouts or a rear disc brake, and that do not have an external rear derailleur such as single-speeds or bikes with an internal-geared hub.

== Compatibility issues ==
The bottom bracket shell and bottom bracket assembly as a whole have changed drastically as bike frames and part manufacturing continues to evolve. While the progression in technology has led to many new standards which is great for the consumer, it has proven to play a challenging role in frame design and aftermarket parts, as well as servicing and changing of parts. Around 2001, Shimano was manufacturing proprietary bottom bracket components with patents. Bike frame manufacturers would then create bikes with the patented bottom brackets as a guiding light around the shell area. This caused aftermarket brands to struggle in creating a bottom bracket that would fit into bikes that came with OEM Shimano parts. Companies such as RaceFace, Chris King, and Truvativ (SRAM Corporation) sat down in 1998 and collaborated on a standard bottom bracket specification. In August 2001, the ISIS Drive Standard was published and made into open source for anyone to create products using the designated specifications. Frame manufacturers took to the idea and created bikes that accepted the standard, allowing for a broader market. This success would prove to be short-lived due to failures and need for the industry to continue progressing and creating better specifications. Now in 2019, Shimano creates non-proprietary as well as proprietary bottom bracket designs such as HollowTech II and BBR60. Many "non OEM" part manufacturers have created bottom bracket conversion kits, giving consumers the ability to install crank sets designed for one standard into another (Example BB/PF30 cranks into a 22/24mm spindle).

== Standards ==
- ISO 6695: Cycles – Pedal axle and crank assembly with square end fittings – Assembly dimensions. International Organization for Standardization, Geneva, 1991. (also: British Standard BS 6102-14)
- ISO 6696: Cycles – Screw threads used in bottom bracket assemblies. 1989. (also: British Standard BS 6102-9)
- ISIS drive
