= Quadrastichodella gracilis =

Scientific classification
- Domain: Eukaryota
- Kingdom: Animalia
- Phylum: Arthropoda
- Class: Insecta
- Order: Hymenoptera
- Family: Eulophidae
- Genus: Quadrastichodella
- Species: Q. gracilis

Binomial name
- Quadrastichodella gracilis Ikeda, 1999

Species of wasp

Quedrastichodella gracilis is a wasp species in the genus Quadrastichodella found in Japan .
