= Quadrastichodella =

Scientific classification
- Kingdom: Animalia
- Phylum: Arthropoda
- Class: Insecta
- Order: Hymenoptera
- Family: Eulophidae
- Subfamily: Tetrastichinae
- Genus: Quadrastichodella; Girault, 1913

Type species
- Quadrastichodella bella Girault, 1913

Species
- Quadrastichodella aenea Girault, 1913; Quadrastichodella bella Girault, 1913; Quadrastichodella boudiennyi Girault, 1937; Quadrastichodella candida (Girault, 1913); Quadrastichodella cyaneiviridis (Girault, 1913); Quadrastichodella gracilis Ikeda, 1999; Quadrastichodella hirsuta Ikeda, 1999; Quadrastichodella neglectae Ikeda, 1999; Quadrastichodella nova Girault, 1922; Quadrastichodella pilosa Ikeda, 1999

Synonyms
- Flockiella Timberlake, 1957; Quadrastichodes Girault, 1913

Genus of wasps

Quadrastichodella is a genus of hymenopteran insects of the family Eulophidae.
