= Suzie Q =

Suzie Q, Susie Q, Suzy Q or Suzi Q may refer to:

== In arts and entertainment ==
=== Music ===
- Suzi Quatro (born 1950), singer and actress also known as "Suzi Q"
- Suzy Q (group), a 1980s Canadian studio project
- "Susie Q" (song), a 1957 song by Dale Hawkins, covered by many artists
- "Suzi Q" (song), by Ammonia, 1996
- Susie Q (Susan Banfield, born 1967), a member of rap duo Cookie Crew
- "Doin' the Suzie-Q", 1936 song by Lil Hardin Armstrong
- "Suzie Q", song by American rapper Skillz on the 2005 album Confessions of a Ghostwriter

=== Other uses in arts and entertainment ===
- Suzie Q (dance move), a dance step in the Big Apple, Lindy Hop, and other dances
- Susie Q (film), a 1995 American TV film
- Suzie Q (manga), a fictional character from Part 2 of the Japanese manga JoJo's Bizarre Adventure: Battle Tendency
- Suzi Q. Smith (born 1979), American poet
- Suzy Q (film), a 1999 Dutch film starring Carice van Houten
- Susie Q, a nickname for Susan Delfino (Teri Hatcher) on the TV show Desperate Housewives

== Other uses ==
- Suzy Q (snack cake), a Hostess snack cake
- Quetiapine (Seroquel), an antipsychotic drug known as Susie-Q
- New York, Susquehanna and Western Railway (NYSW), also known as the Susie-Q
- Susie-Q, a B-26 bomber flown by James Muri during the Battle of Midway

== See also ==
- Siouxsie Q
