= Invesco QQQ =

Exchange-traded fund

Invesco QQQ (best known by its ticker symbol, Nasdaq: QQQ; full fund name Invesco QQQ Trust, Series 1) is an index exchange-traded fund (ETF) sponsored by Invesco and listed on the Nasdaq that replicates the performance of the Nasdaq-100 stock market index by holding the same stocks in the index in the same proportions. The fund is the most traded fund that replicates the performance of the Nasdaq-100. As of July 2026, the fund had approximately $500 billion in assets under management.

== History of the fund ==
The fund was launched on March 10, 1999.

The fund's ticker was changed to "QQQQ" in 2004, then reverted to "QQQ" in March 2011.

In December 2025, the fund changed its structure from a unit investment trust (UIT) to a more flexible open-ended ETF structure under the Investment Company Act of 1940. This allows the fund to reinvest income, participate in securities lending, and utilize custom redemption baskets. The governance of the fund was changed to a board of trustees from a third-party bank trustee. The change also allows Invesco to collect management fees directly; in conjunction with the change, the expense ratio of the fund was reduced from 0.20% to 0.18%.

== See also ==
- List of exchange-traded funds
