= Q factor (bicycles) =

Bicycle measurement

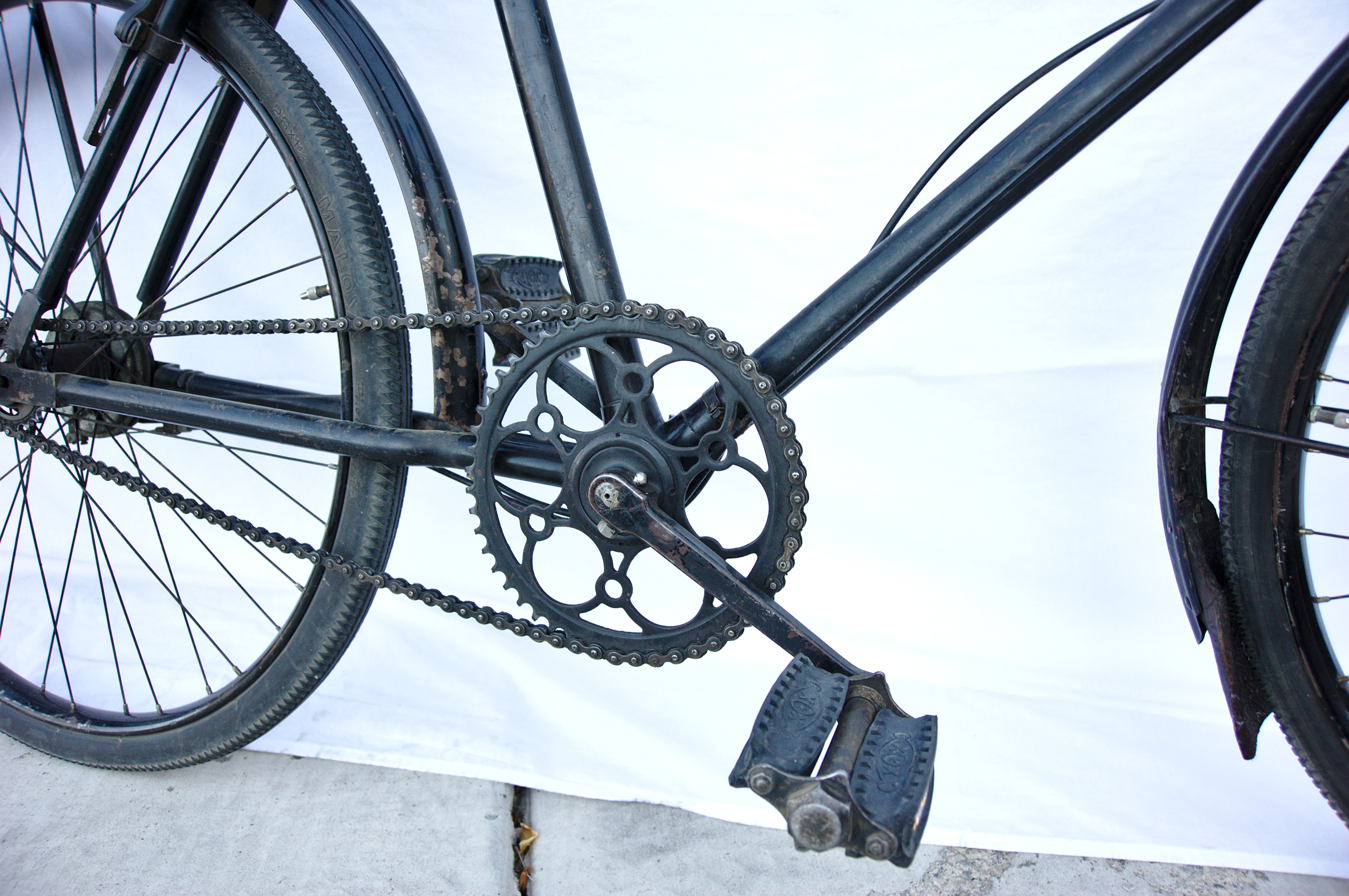
The Q factor is an important factor affecting how close the pedals are laterally, and therefore affects the spread of the riders legs

The Q factor or quack factor of a bicycle is the distance between the pedal attachment points on the crank arms, when measured parallel to the bottom bracket axle. It may also be referred to as the "tread" of the crankset.

== Etymology ==
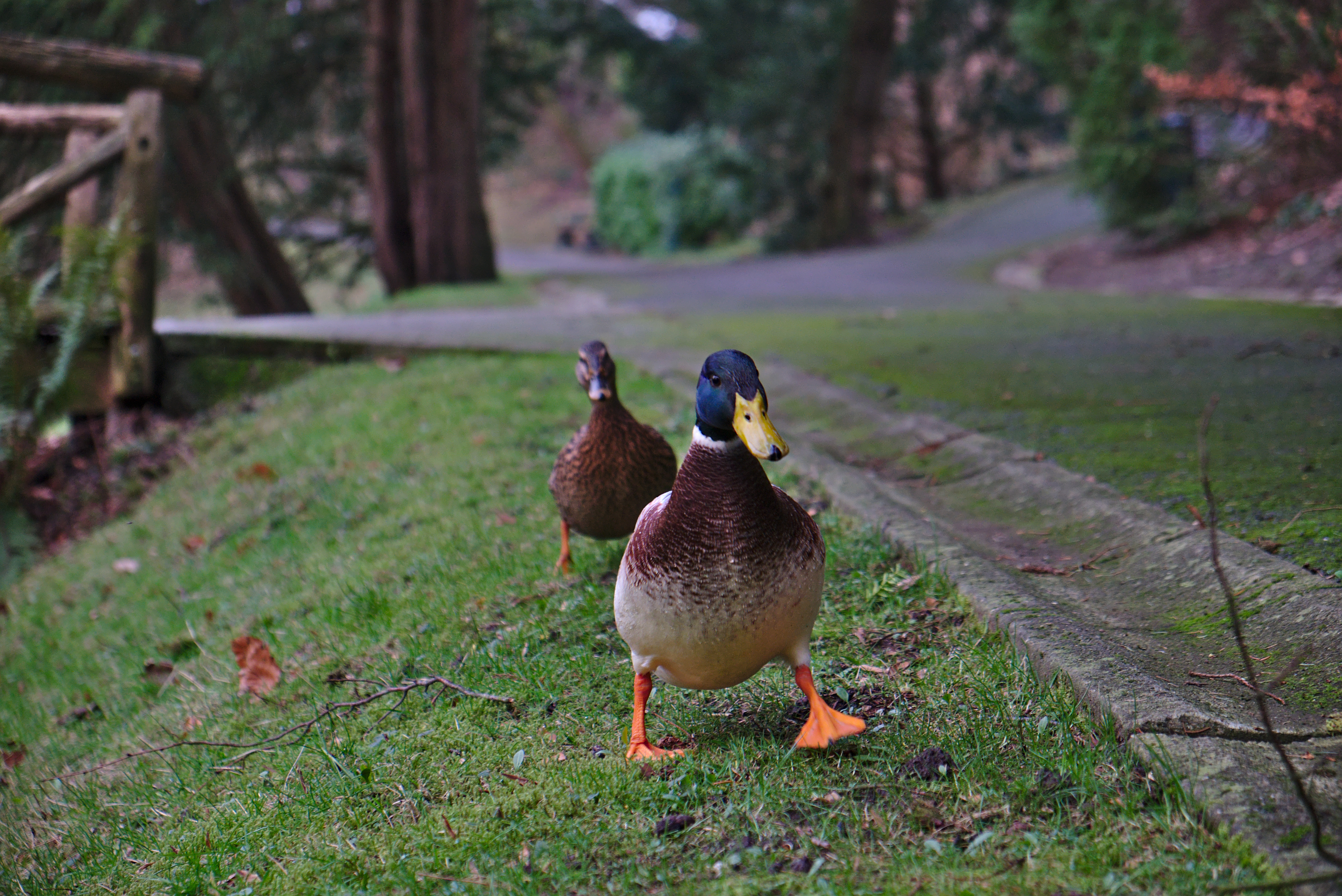
The quack factor is a reference to the wide-stance gait of ducks - the larger the stance, the larger the quack factor

The "Q" stands for "quack", a reference to the wide stance and waddling gait of ducks. The term was coined by Grant Petersen during his time at Bridgestone Bicycles.

== Benefits of a short Q factor ==
Q factor is a function of both the bottom bracket width (axle length) and the cranks. Bottom brackets axles vary in length from 102mm to 127mm. Mountain bike cranks are typically about 20mm wider than road cranks.

A larger Q factor (wider tread) will mean less cornering clearance (while pedaling) for the same bottom bracket height and crank length. A smaller Q factor (narrower tread) is desirable on faired recumbent bicycles because then the fairing can also be narrower, hence smaller and lighter. Sheldon Brown said that a narrower tread is ergonomically superior because it more closely matches the nearly-inline track of human footsteps.

Research from the University of Birmingham in the United Kingdom suggests narrower Q factors are more efficient, likely due to improved application of force during the pedal stroke, as well the potential for reduced knee variability and risk of injury.

=== Notable examples ===
"Old Faithful" was a homebuilt bike that Graeme Obree famously used in 1993 to 1995 at his attempts at the hour record, which had a very narrow bottom bracket measuring only 40 mm wide, and famously also used "washing machine" bearings.

Walser model 5 designed by Andy Walzer from Switzerland was a narrow time trial bike with a 50 mm bottom bracket notably used by Jan Ullrich in the 2003 Tour de France riding for Team Bianchi, and from 2004 to 2006 for T-Mobile Team. The bike also had a narrow rear hub spacing of 110 mm, which is 20 mm narrower than the 130 mm that was standard on road and time trial bikes at the time, resulting in the bike needing custom cranks and custom rear wheels. Narrow Walzer bikes are also said to have been owned by Michael Rich and Lance Armstrong, but for Armstrong the bicycle allegedly resulted in reduced power output "and the smaller Q-factor was rumoured to have induced tendonitis".

Pinarello Bolide F HR was a track bicycle used by Filippo Ganna in 2022 to set the hour record, and featured a narrow profile with a 54 mm bottom bracket, 89 mm rear hub and 69 mm front hub.
