= Q texture =

Hokkien culinary term for the ideal texture of chewy foods

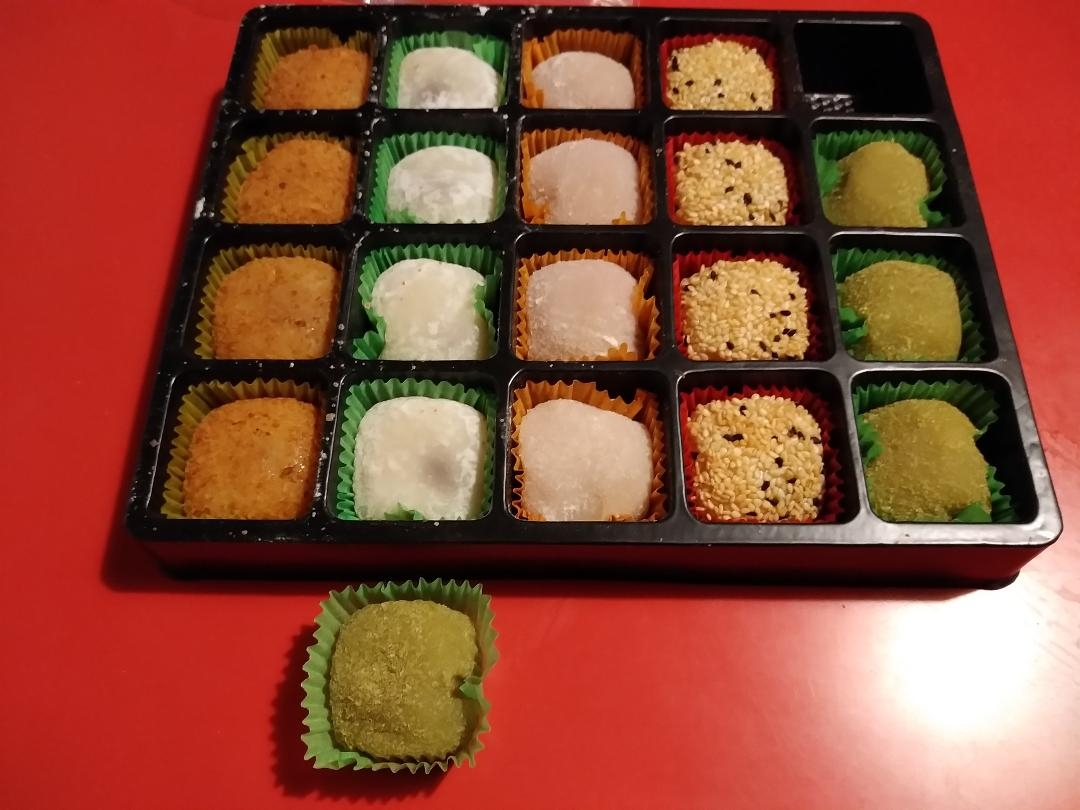
Mochi is an example of a food with the chewy Q texture.

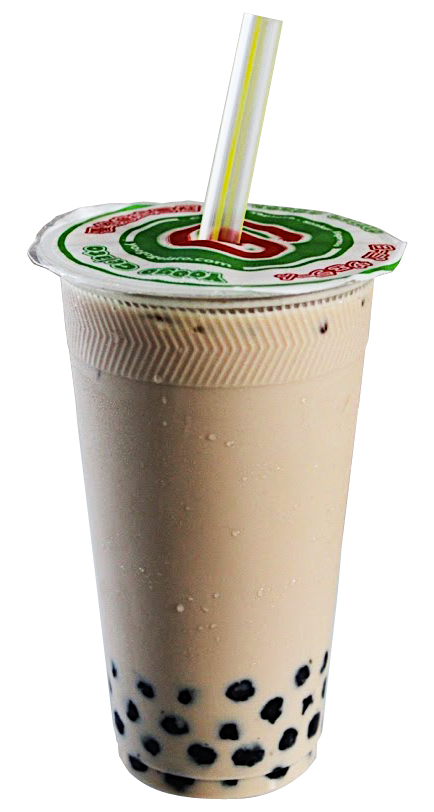
Tapioca balls in boba milk tea is another example.

In Hokkien-speaking areas, Q (Chinese: 𩚨; Pe̍h-ōe-jī: khiū) is a culinary term for the ideal texture of many foods, such as noodles, boba, fish balls and fishcakes. Sometimes translated as "chewy", the texture has been described as "The Asian version of al-dente ... soft but not mushy." Another translation is "springy and bouncy". It also appears in a doubled, more intense form, "QQ".

The term originates from the Hokkien khiū (𩚨), which has a sound similar to the letter "Q" in English, and has since been adopted by other forms of Chinese, such as Mandarin. The use of the letter "Q" to represent khiū (𩚨) may have originated in Taiwan, but it is also widely used in Chinese-speaking communities outside of Taiwan.
