= List of acronyms: Q =

This list contains acronyms, initialisms, and pseudo-blends that begin with the letter Q.

For the purposes of this list:

- acronym = an abbreviation pronounced as if it were a word, e.g., SARS = severe acute respiratory syndrome, pronounced to rhyme with cars
- initialism = an abbreviation pronounced wholly or partly using the names of its constituent letters, e.g., CD = compact disc, pronounced cee dee
- pseudo-blend = an abbreviation whose extra or omitted letters mean that it cannot stand as a true acronym, initialism, or portmanteau (a word formed by combining two or more words).

(a) = acronym, e.g.: SARS – (a) severe acute respiratory syndrome
(i) = initialism, e.g.: CD – (i) compact disc
(p) = pseudo-blend, e.g.: UNIFEM – (p) United Nations Development Fund for Women
(s) = symbol (none of the above, representing and pronounced as something else; for example: MHz – megahertz)

Some terms are spoken as either acronym or initialism, e.g., VoIP, pronounced both as voyp and V-O-I-P.

(Main list of acronyms)

== Q0–9 ==
- Q1 – (p) First Quarter
- Q2 – (p) Second Quarter
- Q3 – (p) Third Quarter
- Q4 – (p) Fourth Quarter

== QA ==
- QA – (s) Qatar (FIPS 10-4 country code; ISO 3166 digram)
- Qantas – (a) Queensland And Northern Territory Aerial Services
- QAP – (a) Quadripartite Advisory Publication ("kwapp")
- QAR – (s) Qatari rial (ISO 4217 currency code)
- QAT – (s) Qatar (ISO 3166 trigram)

== QB ==
- QB – (p) Quarterback (football)

== QC ==
- QC – (i) Quality Control – (s) Québec (postal symbol) – (i) Queen's Counsel
- QCA – (i) Qualifications and Curriculum Authority – Quality Council of Alberta
- QCD – (i) Qualified Charitable Distribution - (p) Quantum ChromoDynamics

== QD ==
- QD – (i) quaque die (Latin, "daily")
- QDOS – (p) Quick and Dirty Operating System ("cue-doss")
- QDR – (i) Quadrennial Defense Review
- QDRO – (a) Qualified domestic relations order ("quad-ro")

== QE ==
- QED – (p) quantum electrodynamics – (i) quid es demonstrata or quod erat demonstrandum (Latin, "that proves it" or "which was to be demonstrated")
- QEH – (i) Queen Elizabeth's Hospital

== QF ==
- QFE – (i) Quoted For Emphasis – (s) Local ground level atmospheric pressure (aeronautical Q code)

== QH ==
- QHE (i) Quantum Heat Engine
- QHP (s) Honorary Physician to the Queen

== QI ==
- QID – (i) quater in die (Latin, "four times daily")
- QIP – (a) Quadrilateral Interoperability Programme (ancestor of MIP; "quip")

== QK ==
- QK – (s) Air Canada Jazz (IATA airline designator)

== QL ==
- QLD – (p) Queensland, (Australia) (postal symbol)

== QM ==
- QM – (i) Quality Management – Quantum Mechanics – Queen Mother

== QN ==
- QNH – (s) Regional mean sea level atmospheric pressure (aeronautical Q code)

== QO ==
- QOS (or QoS)
  - (i) Quality of service
  - Queen of the South F.C. (Scottish football team)

== QP ==
- QPR
  - (i) Quality-Price Ratio (wine evaluation term)
  - Queens Park Rangers F.C. (English football team)
- QPS – (i) Quark Publishing System

== QR ==
- QR – (i) QR code – Quake Rally – Qualitative Reasoning – Queensland Rail – Queen's Rangers – Quick Release – Quiet Riot – (s) Qatar Airways (IATA airline designator)

== QS ==
- QS – (i) quantum sufficit (Latin, "as much as suffices")
- QSCAT – (p) Quick Scatterometer satellite
- QSL – (i) Québec Sign Language
- QSO – (i) Quasi-Stellar Object
- QSTAG – (p) Quadripartite Standardization Agreement ("cue-stag")

== QT ==
- QT – (i) Quentin Tarantino – QuickTime – QuikTrip – QT (cute) Software
- QTE - Quick Time Event
- QTT - (i) Qualified Treatment Trainee - in Wisconsin, a designation for a mental health provider in training as defined in DHS 35.03(17m)

== QU ==
- qu – (s) Quechua language (ISO 639-1 code)
- Quango – (p) (British Commonwealth) QUasi Autonomous Non-Governmental Organisation
- Quasar – (p) Quasi-stellar radio source
- QUB – (i) Queen's University Belfast
- QUC – (i) Queens University of Charlotte
- que – (s) Quechua language (ISO 639-2 code)
- QUIET – (p) Q and U Imaging ExperimenT (Q and U are the Stokes parameters of the CMBR polarization)

== QV ==
- qv – (i) quod vide (Latin "which see")
- QVC – (i) "Quality, Value, Convenience" (home shopping channel)

== QW ==
- QWG – (i) Quadripartite Working Group ("qwig")
- QWGAOR – (i) Quadripartite Working Group on Army Operational Research ("qwig-a-o-r")

== QX ==
- QX - (i) Quality of Experience

== QZ ==
- QZ – (s) Awair (IATA airline designator)
