= SDI =

SDI may refer to:

== Arts and entertainment ==
- SDI (arcade game), 1987, by Sega
- S.D.I. (video game), 1986, by Cinemaware

== Companies and organizations ==
- Samsung SDI, battery manufacturer
- Scottish Development International
- Scuba Diving International
- SDI Media Group, providing subtitling and language services
- SDI Presence, US IT consultancy
- SDI Technologies, a consumer electronics manufacturer, New Jersey, U.S.A.
- Service Desk Institute, for computer help desk staff
- Slum Dwellers International
- Socialisti Democratici Italiani (Italian Democratic Socialists), a political party
- Software Design Inc.
- Spiritual Directors International, supporting spiritual direction
- Steel Dynamics, Inc., a steel producer, Indiana, US.A.

== In science and technology ==
=== Computing and telecommunications ===
- Serial data input in the Serial Peripheral Interface bus
- Serial digital interface for sending video signals over coaxial cable
- Single document interface, a style of graphical user interface
- Software-defined infrastructure, with no human intervention
- Spatial data infrastructure
- Standard Disk Interconnect, a DEC standard
- Statistical Design Institute's SDI Tools for Microsoft Excel
- System Deployment Image, a Microsoft disk image file format

=== Medicine ===
- Sulfadimidine, an antibiotic

=== Other uses in science and technology ===
- Selective dissemination of information
- Silt density index in reverse osmosis systems
- Smoke-developed index, the concentration of smoke emitted by a material
- Spiral Dynamics Integral, a model of evolutionary development
- Stand density index, of the stocking of a stand of trees
- Subsurface drip irrigation
- Suction Diesel Injection, a Volkswagen diesel engine

== Other uses ==
- Saidor Airport (IATA code), in Madang Province, Papua New Guinea
- Social Development Issues, an academic journal
- Socio-Demographic Index of the Global Burden of Disease Study
- State Disability Insurance of California, US
- Strategic Defense Initiative, US anti-missile project
