= Uniformed Services Former Spouses' Protection Act =

- Long title: Uniformed Services Former Spouses' Protection Act
- Acronyms (colloquial): USFSPA
- Nicknames: Former Military Spouses' Protection Act
- Enacted by: the 97th United States Congress
- Effective: February 1, 1983

Citations
- Public law: 97-252
- Statutes at Large: 96 Stat. 718

Codification
- Titles amended: 29 U.S.C.: Armed Forces
- U.S.C. sections created: 10 U.S.C. ch. 71 § 1408 et seq.

Legislative history
- Introduced in the Senate as S. 2248, Department of Defense Authorization Act, 1983 by John Tower (R–TX) on 3/22/1982; Committee consideration by Senate & House Armed Services; (House intro by Rep. Melvin Price (D-IL)) (House CRS H.R. 1711 & H.R. 3039); Passed the Senate on 5/14/1982 (77-21); Passed the House on 7/29/1982 (251-148); Signed into law by President Ronald Reagan on 9/08/1982

United States Supreme Court cases
- McCarty v. McCarty (pre-enactment) Mansell v. Mansell (post-enactment)

The Uniformed Services Former Spouses' Protection Act (or USFSPA) is a U.S. federal law enacted on September 8, 1982 to address issues that arise when a member of the military divorces, and primarily concerns jointly-earned marital property consisting of benefits earned during marriage and while one of the spouses (or both) is a military service member. The divisibility of U.S. military retirement payments in divorce proceedings has had a turbulent legislative and legal history, and the USFSPA has not closely tracked its civilian cousin enacted in 1975, the Employee Retirement Income Security Act (ERISA), although they are similar in some respects with regard to public policy aims.

== Types of post-service pay at issue ==
Military retirees fall into two general categories: those retired for disabilities and those retired for length of service. Members of the U.S. military who serve honorably for a specified period, generally at least 20 years, are entitled to retire and to receive retirement pay. Military veterans are entitled to compensation for service-connected disabilities, a benefit generally called VA disability, with some exceptions. Some service members may be entitled to a different benefit called combat-related special compensation (CRSC) because of disability caused either by direct engagement in an armed conflict or through an instrumentality of war, such as exposure to Agent Orange. In general, eligible service members must elect either retirement pay, or any disability benefit awarded for a service-connected disability, or choose a CRSC benefit alone, but they may not receive all three. However, some veterans may qualify to receive both retirement pay and a disability benefit.

Disposable retired pay is a measure of post-service pay defined as the gross retired pay less (A) any prior military retirement overpayments and recoupments required by law, (B) any court-martial forfeitures, (C) retirement pay waived in order to receive disability payments from the VA, and (D) the premium costs paid for a spouse, or former spouse pursuant to court order, as a designated survivor under the Survivor Benefit Plan.

Former spouses can receive their marital share of the retirement benefit directly from the Defense Finance and Accounting Service (DFAS) rather than from the ex-spouse, but to do so must have at least 10 years of marriage to the service member which overlaps the military service. The Department of Defense Financial Management (DoDFM) Regulation section 7000.14-R entitled Former Spouse Payments from Retired Pay sets forth all of the requirements for former spouses to receive direct payment from DFAS.

== Prior history ==
Military retirement pay has been characterized as both property and as reduced pay for reduced services, and therefore has been a relevant issue in divorce actions for military retirees. Before the enactment of the USFSPA, former spouses had no statutory right to receive a portion of a member's military retired pay such as they would under later revisions of ERISA; for example, in the 1981 McCarty case, the U.S. Supreme Court determined there was total preemption of any such right concerning federal military retirement benefits. The interval between the McCarty decision and the enactment of the USFSPA is known by some courts as the "McCarty period" or the "McCarty interval."

== Enactment effect ==
The USFSPA was enacted in response to the McCarty decision, overturning it, and in the USFSPA the Congress authorized State courts to distribute, with certain limitations, disposable retired pay in a divorce proceeding. The USFSPA specifically allows State courts to treat military retired pay either as the marital property of both the member and spouse (the marital community in community property States) and to allocate it accordingly, or as the property solely of the member, depending upon all the facts and circumstances.

== Post-enactment application ==
Subsequent to the enactment of the USFSPA, State courts grappled with issues raised by its application in marital dissolution proceedings, such as whether the USFSPA may be applied retroactively to divorce decrees that were final and were not appealed after the Supreme Court decision in McCarty and before enactment of the USFSPA, i.e., during the McCarty interval.

The DoDFM regulations implement the USFSPA, and the purpose of the 2009 DoDFM Regulation 7000.14-R is to explain to former spouses how to apply for payments from military retired pay.

== Retirement pay waiver for disability benefits ==
The statute 38 U.S.C. § 3101(a) protects recipients of disability benefits from the claims of creditors and is designed to provide security to the recipient's family and dependents, while 38 U.S.C. § 1310 provides for Dependency and Indemnity Compensation ("DIC") benefits to a surviving spouse. The definition of a former spouse under 10 U.S.C. § 1447(10) is different from the definition of a surviving spouse under 38 U.S.C. § 101(3), notwithstanding any abused spouse issues related to a divorce.

In 1989, the U.S. Supreme Court addressed rights under the USFSPA in the Mansell case and further limited the authority of State courts to assign spousal rights to military retirement pay. In Mansell, the court ruled that the USFSPA does not grant State courts the power to treat, as property divisible upon divorce, military retirement pay which has been waived in order to receive VA disability benefits. In other words, a State court is prohibited from distributing in a divorce action disposable retired pay which constitutes that portion of retired pay that has been waived by the retiree under 38 USC § 5305 in favor of receiving VA disability benefits.

The statute 38 USC § 5305 provides specific rules to follow in order to establish that the military retiree's receipt of VA disability payments resulted from a valid waiver of retirement pay contemplated by the statute. State courts have held, since the Mansell decision, that a military retiree may not agree to pay a portion of their retirement pay as spousal support (alimony) or as a division of marital interests, but then elect, post-judgment, to receive disability pay in an attempt to avoid the obligation to the former spouse, and a State court may order indemnity payments from a retiree who waives retired pay to receive VA disability benefits after a decree of divorce has issued.

== Tax treatment ==
The federal Tax Court has noted that there is no law which excludes military retired pay from income, and ruled in 2012 that the purpose of the USFSPA is not to address the tax treatment of military benefits, but rather to permit Federal, State, and certain other courts to consider military retired pay when fixing property rights between parties to a divorce, dissolution, annulment, or legal separation. Retirees whose former spouses receive a shared portion of the retirement pay do not pay income tax on that portion of retirement pay that is transferred to the former spouse, but the share transferred to the former spouse is taxable to the former spouse. In general, States may not tax retirement pay of military retirees if they do not tax the benefits received by retired State and local government employees.

== See also ==
- Military divorce
- Qualified domestic relations order
- United States Code sections:
  - Title 10, Armed Forces,
  - Title 29, Labor,
  - Title 37, Pay and Allowances of the Uniformed Services, and
  - Title 38, Veterans' Benefits
