= Bypass trust =

In the United States, a bypass trust is an irrevocable trust into which the settlor deposits assets and which is designed to pay trust income and principal to the settlor's spouse for the duration of the spouse's life. The transfer of the settlor's assets to the bypass trust for the benefit of the spouse is a tax-free transfer under the currently unlimited Marital Deduction. At the settlor's death, the assets in the bypass trust are not included in the settlor's estate, effectively reducing the total value of the estate and therefore potentially limiting the estate taxes owed at the settlor's death.

Bypass trusts are used in the United States as a legitimate tool to circumvent gift tax, and to minimize taxation of assets upon death of a married couple. The term may have different meanings in other jurisdictions.

== In the United States ==
A bypass trust is a long-term planning device. It is typically created as part of an A/B Living trust estate plan after the death of the first spouse to die. During life, a married couple transfers ownership of property into a trust. Upon the death of the first party to die, the terms of the trust require that some portion of the property be transferred into "TRUST A" and some other portion into "TRUST B."

Trust A holds property that remains accessible to the surviving spouse during his or her life. That way the surviving spouse has enough wealth at hand to provide for his or her needs until death.

Trust B receives the other portion of the original trust's property in a manner that minimizes taxation, which necessarily prevents it from being accessible to the surviving spouse during his or her life. This trust is meant to pass on property to heirs, usually the spouse's children, on death of the remaining spouse, but in a way that minimizes the estate tax and gift tax that would have been applied to the property if it had passed through a will, or if given as a gift during life (gift inter vivos).

A bypass trust receives property as specified in the trust document - the bypass trust may receive all of the property of the decedent spouse, or half of the spouses' co-owned property, or it may receive enough property to make full use of the decedent's estate tax exclusion.

It is important that each trust be drafted with absolute precision as the IRS has specified the exact wording to be used.

The bypass trust is typically created to achieve one or more of the following goals:

- To maximize the use of the decedent's estate tax exclusion amount, in order to minimize estate tax upon the death of the surviving spouse
- To ensure that the decedent's spouse's property will be disposed of in accordance with the decedent's wishes, even if the surviving spouse remarries or chooses to adopt a different estate plan for the surviving spouse's assets.
