= QCA =

QCA may refer to:

== Computing ==
- Quantum cellular automata, any one of several models of quantum computation
- Quantum dot cellular automaton, a proposed improvement on conventional computer design

== Education ==
- Queensland College of Art, former name of Queensland College of Art and Design, an art and design college in Brisbane and Southport, Queensland, Australia
- Quezon City Academy, a secondary school in Quezon City, Philippines

== Organisations and government agencies ==
- Qualifications and Curriculum Authority, formerly an executive non-departmental public body (NDPB) of the Department for Education in the United Kingdom
- Queensland Cricket Association
- Quoted Companies Alliance, a not-for profit organisation representing small businesses

== Other uses ==
- QCA, IATA code of Mecca, Saudi Arabia's airport
- Qualitative comparative analysis, a technique for solving the problems that are caused by making causal inferences on the basis of only a small number of cases
