= Taxation in Japan =

Japanese system of taxation

Taxation in Japan is based primarily upon a national income tax (所得税) and a municipal tax (住民税) based upon one's area of residence. There are consumption taxes and excise taxes at the national level, an enterprise tax and a vehicle tax at the prefectural level and a property tax at the municipal level.

Taxes are administered by the National Tax Agency.

== Consumption tax ==
The Liberal Democratic Party government of Masayoshi Ōhira had attempted to introduce a consumption tax in 1979. Ohira met a lot of opposition within his own party and gave up on his attempt after his party suffered badly in the 1979 election. Ten years later, Noboru Takeshita successfully negotiated with politicians, bureaucrats, business and labor unions to introduce a consumption tax, which was introduced at a rate of 3% consumption tax in 1989.

In April 1997, under the government of Ryutaro Hashimoto it was increased to 5%. The 5% is made up of a 4% national consumption tax and a 1% local consumption tax. Shortly after the tax was introduced, Japan fell into recession, which was blamed by some on the consumption tax increase, and by others on the 1997 Asian financial crisis.

Prime Minister Jun'ichirō Koizumi said he had no intention of raising the tax during his government, but after his massive victory in the 2005 election he lifted a ban on discussing it. Over the following years a number of LDP politicians discussed raising it further, including prime ministers Shinzō Abe, Yasuo Fukuda, and Tarō Asō.

The Democratic Party of Japan came to power in the August 2009 elections with a promise not to raise the consumption tax for four years. The first DPJ prime minister, Yukio Hatoyama was opposed to a tax increase. Naoto Kan replaced him and called for the consumption tax to be raised. The following prime minister, Yoshihiko Noda "staked his political life" on raising the tax. Despite an internal battle that saw former DPJ leader and co-founder Ichirō Ozawa and many other DPJ diet members vote against the bill and then leave the party, on June 26, 2012, the lower house of the Japanese diet passed a bill to double the tax to 10%. The new bill increased the tax to 8% in April 2014 and 10% in October 2015.

Due to Japan's economic situation, the Abe government delayed the tax increase to 10% twice; initially until April 2017 and then October 2019. The Qualified Invoice is scheduled to implement on which the revised Consumption Tax Law comes into effect in October, 2023. A registered seller has a duty to issue a Qualified Invoice to a buyer when making a taxable transaction in selling goods or rendering services. Whereas the Qualified Invoice being recorded in bookkeeping and thereafter having been kept by a buyer, a consumption tax imposed on the taxable purchase may be eligible to deduct for his consumption tax return.

The tax was a major debate during the 2026 Japanese general election, with the incumbent prime minister Sanae Takaichi pledging to suspend the tax for two years while the opposition Centrist Reform Alliance called for the elimination of the tax altogether.

== Income tax ==
=== Controversial tax law ===
There is a spouse deduction that some have argued discourages men and women from entering the workforce full-time. In Japan, the Wall of 1.03 million yen and 1.30 million yen (103万円・130万円の壁) is a controversial social phenomenon among Japanese spouses due to the government's taxation policy. If a spouse's income is in excess of 1.03 million yen, which constitutes a taxable income of 380,000 yen, the couple can take the marital deduction (配偶者控除). If a spouse's income is in excess of 1.30 million yen, which constitutes a taxable income of 760,000 yen, a couple cannot take the special marital deduction (配偶者特別控除). A couple is not eligible for the marital deduction if the main earner's income is in excess of 10 million yen.

The Japanese income tax system has a progressive tax rate, that increases in stages as income increases.

The method of tax payment differs between those who work for a company and those who do business on their own.

The company you work for deducts income tax from your salary in advance and collectively pays the tax on your behalf, which is called "源泉徴収(Gensen choshu)".

Calculating one's own income and tax for the year and filing a tax return with the tax office is called "確定申告(kakutei shinkoku)".

Income Tax Table for 2021
Tax Base	Tax Rate	Amount of deduction
¥1,000 - ¥1,949,000	5%	0
¥1,950,000 - ¥3,299,000	10%	¥97,500
¥3,300,000 - ¥6,949,000	20%	¥427,500
¥6,950,000 - ¥8,999,000	23%	¥636,000
¥9,000,000 - ¥17,999,000	33%	¥1,536,000
¥18,000,000 - ¥39,999,000	40%	¥2,796,000
Above ¥40,000,000	45%	¥4,796,000

=== Hometown tax ===
Since 2008, Japanese taxpayers have been allowed to pay 2,000 yen to redirect a portion of their income tax to one of the regions, instead of central government. Despite the name, there is no obligation for this to be the taxpayer's "home town". As the regions compete to win these taxes by offering "gifts" of various products and services in exchange, the result is that many taxpayers end up using it to buy products at a lower price. For example, a donation of 2,000 yen can produce a "gift" of 60 kg of rice, equivalent to an adult's annual consumption.

== Inheritance tax ==
In Japan, inheritance tax is levied on individual heirs, not on the deceased's estate as a whole. Inheritance tax must be filed within 10 months of death.

The tax is levied at a progressive rate (up to 55%) based on the fair market value of the estate or inherited assets minus funeral expenses and any debts, exemptions, or allowances related to the inherited assets.

Tax rates vary and depend on the amount of property or assets received.

Japanese Inheritance Tax 2021
Tax Base	Tax Rate	Amount of deduction
Up to ¥10 million	10%	0
¥10 million - ¥30 million	15%	¥0.5 million
¥30 million - ¥50 million	20%	¥2 million
¥50 million - ¥100 million	30%	¥7 million
¥100 million - ¥200 million	40%	¥17 million
¥200 million - ¥300 million	45%	¥27 million
¥300 million - ¥600 million	50%	¥42 million
Above ¥600 million	55%	¥72 million

There are several exemptions and tax credits associated with inheritance tax.

Excluding the basic exemptions, other possible tax exemptions available are:

- Donations of property to certain non-profit organizations or public institutions
- ¥5 million retirement allowance per legal heir
- Life insurance benefits of ¥5 million per legal heir

Eligible tax credits include:

- For heirs under 20 years of age: ¥100.000 x (age of heir)
- For disabled heirs: ¥100.000 x (age of heir)
- In the case of a special disabled heir: ¥200.000 x (heir's age)
- Foreign tax credit is also available (to avoid double taxation)

== Corporation tax ==
Taxes imposed in Japan on income derived from corporate activities include:

- Corporate tax (national tax)
- Local corporate tax (national tax)
- Inhabitant tax (local tax)
- Enterprise tax (local tax)
- Special local corporate tax (national tax) (However, declared and paid to the local government together with enterprise tax)

== Alcohol tax ==
Japanese alcohol tax is the one on alcoholic beverages such as sake, beer, and whiskey. It applies to beverages with an alcohol content of 1 degree or more, and the amount of tax is determined in detail according to the type of alcohol and alcohol content of the alcoholic beverage. The tax is paid by the manufacturer or importer, but since it is included in the price, it is actually the consumer who pays the tax.

== Tobacco tax ==
In Japan, the price of cigarettes includes four types of taxes: national tobacco tax, local tobacco tax, special tobacco tax, and consumption tax. Although it varies by brand and other factors, for example, the tax burden on a typical paper cigarette can reach as high as 60%, making cigarettes one of the most heavily taxed products in Japan.

== Property tax ==
Taxes are applied to the three stages of property ownership in Japan: acquisition, possession, and transfer of property.

=== Taxes on the acquisition of property ===
The main tax applied to the acquisition of tax is the "real estate acquisition tax", which is to be paid to the prefecture. This tax is generally set at 4% of the combined assessed value of the land and building, but can differ depending on the prefecture/area. The acquisition of residential property often qualifies for a temporarily reduced rate of 3%.

Other taxes:

- Registration and license tax
- Consumption tax

=== Taxes on the possession of property ===
When possessing property, the main tax is an annual "fixed asset tax" to be paid to the municipality. This tax is generally set at 1.4% of the combined assessed value of the land and building, but can differ depending on the prefecture/area. For properties located in "designated urban planning areas" under Japan's City Planning Act, a separate "city-planning tax" of 0.3% is imposed to, and collected with the fixed asset tax.

=== Taxes on the transfer of property ===
When a property is sold, the profit from the sale is subject to a capital gains tax, and is to be paid to the national government. For properties held five years or less, short term rates of 30% (+9% local tax) of the capital gain are applied. For properties held more than five years, long term rates of 15% (+5% local tax) are applied.

Other taxes:

- Inheritance tax
- Gift tax
