= QD =

QD may refer to:

== Businesses and organizations ==
- QD (retailer), a chain of discount retail outlets in England
- Dobrolet (airline) (IATA airline designator QD), a Russian low-cost carrier
- JC International Airlines (IATA airline designator QD), a Cambodian airline

== Science and technology ==
- Quantum dots, in nanotechnology
- N-Gage QD, a handheld game console and smartphone
- Dermatologicals, a veterinary ATC code D
- Queue depth, a measure of concurrency in SSD benchmarking; see IOPS
- Quick Disk, a type of miniature floppy disk used primarily in the 1980s

== Other uses ==
- Quaque die, "every day" in Latin; mainly pharmaceutical usage
- Quarterdeck, a raised deck behind the main mast of a sailing ship
- The EU Qualification Directive (Directive 2011/95/EU of the European Parliament and of the Council of 13 December 2011 on standards for the qualification of third-country nationals or stateless persons as beneficiaries of international protection, for a uniform status for refugees or for persons eligible for subsidiary protection, and for the content of the protection granted)
