= QID =

QID is an acronym and may refer to:

- Quater in die (q.i.d.), a medical abbreviation meaning "four times each day"
- Queen's Indian Defense, a chess opening
- Q-identifier, used in Wikidata
