= VQ =

VQ may refer to:

- Nissan VQ engine, an automobile engine
- Holden VQ Statesman/Caprice, an automobile
- Vector quantization, in signal processing
- Ventilation Quotient or Ventilation/perfusion scan, in medicine
- Veritable Quandary, a restaurant in Portland, Oregon, US
- United States Virgin Islands (FIPS 10-4 country code VQ)
- The Vice Quadrant, a 2015 album by Steam Powered Giraffe
- Novoair (IATA code VQ), an airline from Bangladesh
- VisionQuest, a 2026 miniseries produced by Marvel Television

== See also ==
- QV (disambiguation)
- V (disambiguation)
- Q (disambiguation)
