= List of Six Sigma software packages =

There are generally four classes of software used to support the Six Sigma process improvement protocol:

- Analysis tools, which are used to perform statistical or process analysis;
- Program management tools, used to manage and track a corporation's entire Six Sigma program;
- DMAIC and Lean online project collaboration tools for local and global teams;
- Data Collection tools that feed information directly into the analysis tools and significantly reduce the time spent gathering data.

== Analysis tools ==
- ARIS Six Sigma
- IBM WebSphere Business Modeler
- JMP
- Oracle Crystal Ball (part of Oracle Fusion Middleware)
- Microsoft Visio
- Minitab
- NCSS Statistical Software
- QPR ProcessGuide by QPR Software
- Quality Companion by Minitab
- RCASE
- R language (Note: Statistical and graphic functions from the base installation can be used for Six Sigma projects. Furthermore, some contributed packages at CRAN contains specific tools for Six Sigma: SixSigma, qualityTools, qcc and IQCC.) (open source)
- SDI Tools
- SigmaXL
- Software AG webMethods BPM Suite
- Statgraphics
- STATISTICA
- Telelogic System Architect
- Simply Sigma DFSS
