= Spiritual direction =

Attempt to deepen, as a guide, another's relationship with the divine

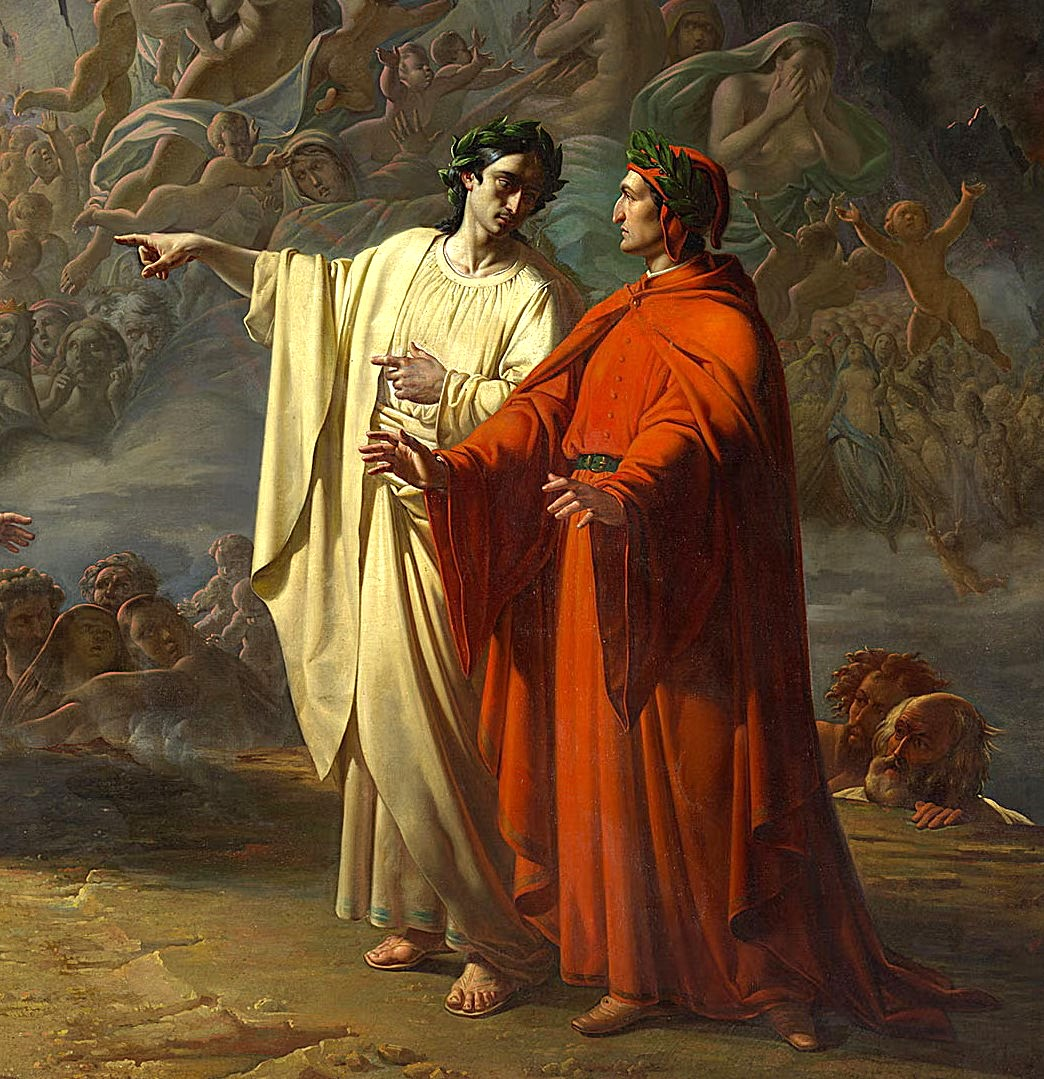
Virgil acts as Dante's spiritual guide, leading him through Hell (detail from Inferno, oil on canvas by Tommaso De Vivo in Royal Palace of Naples, 1863)

Spiritual direction is the practice of being with people as they attempt to deepen their relationship with the divine, or to learn and grow in their personal spirituality. The person seeking direction shares stories of their encounters of the divine, or how they are cultivating a life attuned to spiritual things. The director listens and asks questions to assist the directee in their process of reflection and spiritual growth. Advocates of Spiritual direction claim that it develops a deeper awareness with the spiritual aspect of being human, and that it is neither psychotherapy nor counseling nor financial planning.

Historians of philosophy like Ilsetraut and Pierre Hadot have argued that spiritual direction was already practiced and recommended by the main schools of philosophy, as well as by physicians like Galen, as part of spiritual practices in Ancient Greece and Rome.

== Roman Catholic forms ==
While there is some degree of variability, there are primarily two forms of spiritual direction in the Roman Catholic Church: regular direction and retreat direction. They differ largely in the frequency of meetings and in the intensity of reflection.

Regular direction can involve a one- to two-hour meeting every four to eight weeks, and thus is slightly less intense than retreat direction, although spiritual exercises and disciplines are often given for the directee to attempt between meetings.

If the directee is on a retreat (lasting a weekend, a week or even 40 days), they will generally meet with their director on a daily basis for one hour. During these daily meetings, exercises or spiritual disciplines such as lectio divina are given to the directee as sustenance to further their spiritual growth.

The Spiritual Exercises of Ignatius of Loyola are a popular example of guidelines used for spiritual direction.

== Historical traditions ==
=== Ancient Greece and Rome ===
Most of ancient schools of philosophy remarked the importance of spiritual direction in order to improve moral education. This guidance, a kind of "therapy of the souls", led the pupils to self-awareness of their faults and progress. Socrates can be considered as the ideal of spiritual director among his followers, but Plato also guided his students with personal advice and comfort through their learning process. Aristotle would have fixed some rules for a proper spiritual guidance of pupils in the second book of his Rhetoric. Other examples can be found in Cynics, Epicureans—who used epistolary form for this purpose (e.g., Metrodorus)— or Stoics —like Marcus Aurelius, Seneca, Musonius Rufus or Epictetus in his Discourses—who actively practiced spiritual direction. Philodemus' work On Frank Criticism showed that spiritual guidance should be based on freedom of speech (parrhesia) and mutual respect between master and pupil. A physician like Galen, not affiliated to any school of philosophy, recommended to follow spiritual guidance from an aged and experienced man before attempting self-examination.

=== Western Christianity ===
Within Christianity, spiritual direction has its roots in early Christianity. The gospels describe Jesus serving as a mentor to his disciples. Additionally, Acts of the Apostles chapter 9 describes Ananias helping Paul of Tarsus to grow in his newfound experience of Christianity. Likewise, several of the Pauline epistles describe Paul mentoring both Timothy and Titus among others. Tradition also states that John the Evangelist tutored Polycarp, the 2nd-century bishop of Smyrna.

Theologian John Cassian, who lived in the 4th century, provided some of the earliest recorded guidelines on the Christian practice of spiritual direction. He introduced mentoring in the monasteries. Each novice was put under the care of an older monk. Benedict of Nursia integrated Cassian's guidelines into what is now known as the Rule of Saint Benedict.

Spiritual direction is widespread in the Catholic tradition: a person with wisdom and spiritual discernment, usually but not exclusively a priest or consecrated in general, provides counsel to a person who wishes to make a journey of faith and discovery of God's will in their life. The spiritual guide aims to discern and understand what the Holy Spirit, through the situations of life, spiritual insights in the fruit of prayer, reading and meditation on the Bible, tells the person accompanied. The spiritual father or spiritual director may provide advice, give indications of life and prayer, resolving doubts in matters of faith and morals without replacing the choices and decisions to the person accompanying.

=== Eastern Orthodoxy ===
Eastern Orthodoxy comes from the same pre-schism traditions, but the role of a "spiritual director" or "elder" in Orthodoxy has maintained its important role. The original Greek term geron (meaning 'elder', as in gerontology) was rendered by the Russian word starets, from the Old Church Slavonic starĭtsĭ, 'elder', derived from starŭ, 'old'. The Greek tradition has a long unbroken history of elders and disciples, such as Sophronius and John Moschos in the 7th century, Symeon the Elder and Symeon the New Theologian in the 11th century, and contemporary charismatic gerontes such as Porphyrios and Paisios. Sergius of Radonezh and Nil Sorsky were two most venerated startsy of Muscovy. The revival of elders in the Slavic world is associated with the name of Paisius Velichkovsky (1722–1794), who produced the Russian translation of the Philokalia. The most famous Russian starets of the early 19th century was Seraphim of Sarov (1759–1833), who went on to become one of the most revered Orthodox saints. The Optina Pustyn near Kozelsk used to be celebrated for its startsy (Schema-Archimandrite Moses, Schema-Hegumen Anthony, Hieroschemamonk Leonid, Hieroschemamonk Macarius, Hieroschemamonk Hilarion, Hieroschemamonk Ambrose, Hieroschemamonk Anatole (Zertsalov)). Such writers as Nikolay Gogol, Aleksey Khomyakov, Leo Tolstoy and Konstantin Leontyev sought advice from the elders of this monastery. They also inspired the figure of Zosima in Dostoyevsky's novel The Brothers Karamazov. A more modern example of a starets is Archimandrite John Krestiankin (1910–2006) of the Pskov Monastery of the Caves, who was popularly recognized as such by many Orthodox living in Russia.

=== Judaism ===
In Judaism, the Hebrew term for spiritual director differs among traditional communities. The verb Hashpa'ah is common in some communities though not all; the spiritual director called a mashpi'a occurs in the Chabad-Lubavitch community and also in the Jewish Renewal community. A mashgiach ruchani is the equivalent role among adherents of the Mussar tradition. The purpose of Hashpa'ah is to support the directee in their personal relationship with God, and to deepen that person's ability to find God's presence in ordinary life. Amongst Lubavitchers this draws on the literature and praxis of Hasidism as it is practiced according to Chabad standards, and to Jewish mystical tradition generally. Spiritual mentorship is customary in the Hasidic world, but not necessarily in the same way.

=== Sufism ===
In Sufism, the term used for spiritual master is murshid, Arabic for 'guide' or 'teacher'. A murshid is more than a spiritual director and is believed to be guiding the disciples based on his direct connectivity with the Divine. The murshid's role is to spiritually guide and verbally instruct the disciple on the Sufi path after the disciple takes an oath of allegiance or Bay'ah (bai'ath) with him. The concept of Murshid Kamil Akmal (also known as Insan-e-Kamil) is significant in most tariqas. The doctrine states that from pre-existence till pre-eternity, there shall always remain a Qutb or a Universal Man upon the earth who would be the perfect manifestation of God and at the footsteps of the Islamic prophet Muhammad.

== See also ==
- Vocations in the Catholic Church
- Ho'oponopono
- Murshid
- Pir (Sufism)
- Spiritual Directors International

== Bibliography ==
=== Classics ===
- Aelred of Rievaulx (2010) [1160-62]. Spiritual Friendship. Liturgical Press. ISBN 978-0-87907-957-4.
- John Cassian (1894). The Conferences of John Cassian. Christian Classics Ethereal Library.
- Teresa of Avila. "Works of St. Teresa of Avila (Online)". Christian Classics Ethereal Library.
- Thomas Merton (1960). Spiritual Direction and Meditation. Liturgical Press. ISBN 978-0-8146-0412-0.
- Saint Francis de Sales (1885). Introduction to the Devout Life (online). Dublin: M. H. Gill and Sons.
- Saint Francis de Sales (1997) [1616]. Treatise on the Love of God. Translated by Henry Benedict Mackey. TAN Books. ISBN 0-89555-526-3.
- Saint Jeanne-Françoise de Chantal (1988). Francis de Sales, Jane de Chantal: Letters of Spiritual Direction. Paulist Press. ISBN 978-0-8091-2990-4.
- Samuel Rutherford (1891). Letters of Samuel Rutherford. London: Oliphants Ltd. Alt
- Louis de Blois (1900). Institutio Spiritualis: A Book of Spiritual instruction. St. Louis MO, USA.
- --do.-- (1900) A Book of Spiritual Instruction: Institutio spiritualis; translated from the Latin by Bertrand A. Wilberforce. London: Art and Book Company
- Auguste Saudreau (1907). The Degrees of the Spiritual Life. Translated by Bede Camm. London: R. T. Washbourne.

=== Later period ===
Later writings on spiritual direction (as per Top ten reading list for spiritual directors – January 19, 2013):

- Reginald Garrigou-Lagrange (1938). "The Three Ages of the Interior Life". Catholic Spiritual Teaching.
- Teresa Blythe (2018). Spiritual Direction 101: The Basics of Spiritual Guidance. Apocryphile Press, ISBN 978-1-947826-20-5
- "Perfect Spiritual Guide in Sufism". Archived from the original on 2015-09-20.
- Pierre Teilhard de Chardin (1957). The Divine Milieu: An Essay on the Interior Life. Harper Torchbooks, The Cathedral Library, NY.
- Kenneth Leech (2001) [1977]. Soul Friend. Church Publishing, Inc. ISBN 978-0-8192-2539-9.
- Friedrich von Hügel (1928). Letters from Baron Friedrich von Hügel to a Niece. J. M. Dent & Sons.
- Adolphe Tanquerey (1932). The Spiritual Life: A Treatise on Ascetical and Mystical Theology. Society of St. John the Evangelist, Desclée.
- Francis W. Vanderwall (1981). Spiritual direction: an invitation to abundant life. Paulist Press. ISBN 978-0-8091-2399-5.
- William A. Barry (1982). The Practice of Spiritual Direction. HarperCollins. ISBN 978-0-86683-951-8.
- Margaret Guenther (1992). Holy Listening: The Art of Spiritual Direction. Rowman & Littlefield. ISBN 978-1-56101-056-1.
- Charles Hugo Doyle (2011). Guidance In Spiritual Direction. CreateSpace Independent Pub. ISBN 978-1463597542.
- Francis Fernandez Carvajal (2012). Through Wind and Waves: On Being a Spiritual Guide. Scepter. ISBN 978-1594171666.
- Hughson, Shirley Carter (1952) The Spiritual Letters of Father Hughson of the Order of the Holy Cross. West Park, New York: Holy Cross Press; London: A. R. Mowbray, 1953
