= QCD (disambiguation) =

QCD, or Quantum chromodynamics, is the theory of the strong interaction between quarks and gluons.

QCD may also refer to:

== Business ==
- Quality, cost, delivery, in lean manufacturing
- Quality Custom Distribution, a subsidiary of Golden State Foods
- AGFiQ Enhanced Core Canadian Equity ETF (stock ticker: QCD); see List of Canadian exchange-traded funds

== Other uses ==
- Qualified Charitable Distribution in US income tax law
- Quintessential Player, formerly known as Quintessential CD; a freeware media player
- quasi-circular depression, a type of geographic feature on Mars; see Geology of Mars
- Quad City Downs, East Moline, Illinois, USA; a horse race track
- Quad City DJ's, American hip hop group
- Quantum Cascade Detector, photodetector sensitive to infrared radiation

== See also ==
- KQCD, callsign QCD in region K
- WQCD (disambiguation), callsign QCD in region W
