= QOS =

QOS, QoS or Qos may refer to:

== Entertainment ==
- Quantum of Solace, a James Bond story from the collection For Your Eyes Only
  - Quantum of Solace, a 2008 James Bond film
- A Question of Sport, a BBC television quiz show

== Technology ==
- Quality of service, in computer networking, telephony etc.
- Quarterdeck Office Systems, a software company now part of Symantec

== Other meanings ==
- Queen of the South F.C., a Scottish football club
- Qos (deity), the national god of the Edomites
- Queen of spades, the playing card

== See also ==
- Queensland Ornithological Society Inc (QOSI), a state birding organisation in Australia
- QDOS (disambiguation)
