= WQCD =

WQCD may refer to:

- WQCD (AM), a radio station (1550 AM) licensed to Delaware, Ohio, United States
- WPUT (FM), a radio station (90.1 FM) licensed to serve North Salem, New York, which held the call sign WQCD from 2014 to 2015
- WJZZ (FM), a radio station (88.1 FM) licensed to Montgomery, New York, which held the call sign WQCD in 2014
- WYNY (AM), a radio station (1450 AM) licensed to Millford, Pennsylvania, which held the call sign WQCD from 2008 to 2009
- WFAN-FM, a radio station (101.9 FM) licensed to serve New York, New York, which held the call sign WQCD from 1988 to 2008

== See also ==
- KQCD-TV
- QCD (disambiguation)
