= 4Q =

4Q or 4q may refer to:

- 4Q, IATA code for Safi Airways
- The fourth quarter of a calendar year
- The fourth quarter of a fiscal year
- A four-quadrant movie, which appeals to all four major demographic quadrants
- The 4Q Mangrenade, a 2006 album by Driller Killer
- A-4Q, a model of Douglas A-4 Skyhawk
- 4Q, designation for one of the Qumran Caves
- 4q, an arm of Chromosome 4 (human)
- 4Q, the production code for the 1977 Doctor Who serial The Face of Evil

== See also ==
- Q4 (disambiguation)
