= QRS (disambiguation) =

QRS may refer to:

- QRS complex
- QRS concordance
- QRS Music Technologies, recording and musical instrument manufacturer
- QR Sagittae, star also known as WR 124
- QRS Sunderland, former name of Newcastle Eagles basketball team
- Radio Q code for "slow down" (in sending Morse code)

== See also ==
- QR (disambiguation) for the singular of QRs
