= QDR =

QDR may refer to:

== Telecommunications and electronics ==
- QDR, a Q code request for heading (bearing)
- Quad data rate, a communication signaling technique
  - InfiniBand, a computer network communications link used in high-performance computing
  - Quad Data Rate SRAM, a type of computer memory that transfers data using QDR

== Other uses ==
- Quadrennial Defense Review, a former four-yearly review of US military objectives
- Qatar Domain Registry, the operator of the .qa ccTLD
- WQDR-FM, Raleigh, North Carolina, USA; a radio station, station QDR in region W; operating as "94.7 QDR"
- Queda de Rins (literally "fall on the kidneys"), in the list of capoeira techniques

== See also ==
- Qualified domestic relations order (QDRO), a judicial order in the United States
- KQDR, a radio station, station QDR in region K
