= QPR (disambiguation) =

QPR most often refers to Queens Park Rangers F.C., an English football club.

QPR may also refer to:

- Queens Park Rangers F.C. Women, founded in 2022
- Queens Park Rangers W.F.C., now known as Hounslow W.F.C., an English women's football club
- QPR Software, a Finnish software firm
- Queen + Paul Rodgers, a 2004–09 musical supergroup
- Queens Park Rangers SC, a football club playing in Grenada's Premier Division
- Queensland Premier Rugby, a rugby club in Australia
- Queerplatonic relationship, a non-romantic relationship between significant others
- Quality-Price Ratio, in wine terminology, a designation for rating wine
