= QZ =

QZ may refer to:

- Indonesia AirAsia, a low-cost airline (IATA:QZ; founded 1999)
- Quartz, a crystalline mineral (IMA:Qz)
- Quartz (publication), a business news ezine (at qz.com; launched 2012)
- QZ decomposition of matrices, in linear algebra

== See also ==
- QS (disambiguation)
- ZQ (disambiguation)
