= QV =

QV or Qv or q.v. may stand for:

- Quod vide (Latin for "for which see"), in cross-references and citations

== Places ==
- Valley of the Queens, whose tombs are given the prefix "QV"
- Quaker Valley School District, a school district centered in Sewickley, Pennsylvania, United States
- Queen Victoria Village, a precinct in the central business district of Melbourne, Australia

== Vehicles and transportation ==
- Lao Airlines (IATA code QV)
- MS Queen Victoria, a cruise ship operated by Cunard Line
- QV, meaning "4-valve" (quad valve), a type of multi-valve
- Alfa Romeo Quadrifoglio (Verde), a symbol of Alfa Romeo racing cars and higher trim street cars

== Other uses ==
- ATCvet code QV Various, a section of the Anatomical Therapeutic Chemical Classification System for veterinary medicinal products
- Quantz Verzeichnis, see List of compositions by Johann Joachim Quantz
- Queen Victoria, a queen of the United Kingdom
- Nikon QV-mount, an interchangeable lens mount developed by Nikon for its QV-1000C filmless camera

== See also ==
- QVH (disambiguation)
- VQ (disambiguation)
- V (disambiguation)
- Q (disambiguation)
