= Paul Douglas Tougaw =

Electrical engineering professor

Paul Douglas ("Doug") Tougaw (born July 3, 1969), is a full professor in and chair of the Department of Electrical and Computer Engineering at Valparaiso University. He received his B.S. in electrical engineering from the Rose-Hulmann Institute of Technology and his M.S. and Ph.D. in electrical engineering from the University of Notre Dame in 1995. In 2005, Tougaw earned an MBA from Valparaiso University's College of Business Administration. His main area of research interest is in the field of Quantum Cellular Automata (QCA). He was awarded the "Best Regional Paper" award at the 2007 Conference of the American Society of Engineering Educators. He was also runner-up for the USA National IEEE Young Engineer award.

Doug Tougaw's contribution to the field has focused on the building of medium-scale integration components such as full-adders from basic QCA gates as well as fault-tolerance studies of QCA wires.

Presently, Doug Tougaw is the Richardson Professor and member of the department of electrical and computer engineering at Valparaiso University.

== Recent work with Quantum cellular automata (QCA) devices ==
Recently, Dr. Tougaw has developed a Quantum-dot Cellular Automata (QCA) device having normal QCA cells laid out in a planar structure, having a set of input lines and a set of orthogonal output lines. The device has clocking regions that control the flow of binary signals through the device. The input columns are driven by a separate input signal, and all the cells of each column align to match their input signal. These input columns then serve as drivers for output rows that act as serial shift registers under the control of clock signals applied to sub-sections of the rows. In this way, a copy of the contents of each of the input signals propagates along each of the output rows to an output cell. The output cells of each output row may be assigned their own, latching clock signal.
