= QSO =

QSO may refer to:

- Quasi-stellar object or quasar
- Queen's Service Order, New Zealand honour
- Queensland Symphony Orchestra
- The Quantic Soul Orchestra
- QSO, a Q code used in commercial and amateur radio communication
- The IATA airport code for Sousse, Tunisia
