= New York divorce law =

Divorce law in New York, United States

New York divorce law changed on August 15, 2010, when Governor David Paterson signed no-fault divorce into law in New York state. Until 2010, New York recognized divorces only upon fault-based criteria or upon separation. The State Senate approved the No-Fault Divorce bill on June 30, and the State Assembly passed the bill on July 1.

== Overview ==
Despite being generally considered a liberal state, New York has a history of being conservative on issues regarding marriage; it was the last state in the country to allow no-fault divorce, and maintained until 2024 a (seldom enforced) law against adultery (Penal Law § 255.17). Until 1966, adultery was the only ground of divorce; cruelty, a ground that had long been available in most other states, was not available in New York.

== Divorce grounds ==
New York is a mixed state that allows for both no-fault and at-fault divorce. In the US, about one-third of states, most of them in the West and Midwest, are only no-fault, having abolished at-fault divorce. A notable non-Western and non-Midwestern state that is only no fault is Florida.

=== At fault divorce ===
The state of New York is one of the states which allow the possibility of an at fault divorce. In this case, one party accuses the other of a wrongdoing (the "fault"). The other party may or may not contest. In the past, the parties might use the at fault grounds to obtain a mutually desired and agreed upon divorce: they can agree to an uncontested divorce as long as one of the parties is willing to allege one of the fault-based grounds and the other party accepts the "fault" without contesting it. The continued availability of fault grounds gives a spouse leverage in extracting a favorable settlement, as the filing spouse can threaten to sue on a fault ground, which may have adverse social or business effects on the other spouse, unless the filer's demands are met in the settlement.

An at fault divorce can be obtained due to the following:

- Cruel and inhuman treatment (Domestic Relations Law §170.1)
- Abandonment for a continuous period of one year or more (DRL §170.2)
- Imprisonment for more than three years subsequent to the marriage (DRL §170.3)
- Adultery (DRL §170.4)

Cruel and inhuman treatment must be behavior by the defendant that rises to the level such that it makes it improper for the plaintiff to continue to reside with the defendant as husband and wife. Allegations under this ground include allegations of domestic violence and repeated, extreme mental cruelty.

Abandonment may be actual or constructive. Actual abandonment is usually one spouse leaving the marital residence without the consent of the other spouse without intention to return. One spouse may also lock out the other spouse from the marital residence. Constructive abandonment is the refusal of "basic obligation arising from the marital contract," including a cessation of sexual relations; establishing such a prior constructive abandonment may render the spouse who leaves, or locks out the other, as the innocent spouse.

Adultery is difficult to prove as it requires corroborating evidence from a third party; thus a statement by the defendant that he or she had sexual relations with a third party is not legally admissible to permit the court to grant a divorce to the plaintiff. Furthermore, if the adultery was "condoned", i.e. the cheated-on party knew about the extra-marital sexual relationship but continued to stay in a marital, conjugal relationship with their spouse, the adultery cannot serve as a cause for divorce.

=== Irretrievable breakdown (no fault) ===
Since 2010, a new ground has been added, effectively permitting no-fault divorce in New York state:

- The relationship between husband and wife has broken down irretrievably for a period of at least six months (DRL §170.7)

The parties may also disagree over child support, custody, alimony, division of joint assets or who is going to pay legal fees. These are known as "ancillary relief" (see below) that are requested by one or both of the parties. No judgment of divorce may be granted under the no fault ground unless and until the economic issues of equitable distribution of marital property, the payment or waiver of spousal support, the payment of child support, the payment of counsel and experts’ fees and expenses as well as the custody and visitation with the minor children of the marriage have been resolved by the parties, or determined by the court, and incorporated into the judgment of divorce.

=== Separation as ground of divorce ===
Separation may also be a ground of divorce.

- Judgment of Separation: "Decree of Separation" or "Judgment of Separation", given by the court, for at least one year
- Separation Agreement: Spouses have not lived together for at least one year, and have signed an "Agreement of Separation".

== Procedure ==
=== Contested divorce ===
The grounds for divorce may be decided by a jury or by a judge, all other ancillary relief is considered equitable in nature and must be decided by the judge alone.

The grounds in all cases must be specifically stated in the complaint, giving factual details, dates, and actual places of occurrence. Lack of proper content is not an affirmative defense; the plaintiff must prove the allegations even if uncontroverted; proof is made according to the general rules of evidence. Failure to state a cause of action will result in a judgment dismissing the complaint. Divorce may commence by means of filing and service of a Summons with Notice on the defendant. The defendant must then make an appearance and demand for the complaint by the plaintiff, or is at risk of having the plaintiff granted the divorce by default. Forms for filing or responding to a divorce are available on the state courts website.

Once the case is filed and served the parties must request a Preliminary Conference within ninety days if the case is to be treated as a contested divorce. Such Preliminary Conference will be scheduled if one of the parties files a "Request for Judicial Intervention" (RJI) with required fee. At the Preliminary Conference the court may deal with interim issues, (i.e. temporary custody, child support, attorney fees or spousal support) and will schedule discovery between the parties that includes the valuation of assets and pensions to be divided between the parties.

=== Uncontested divorce ===
If all the issues are decided between the parties they may agree to submit the papers to the court for approval; this is known as an uncontested divorce. When the defendant is served but does not answer the legal pleadings, the plaintiff may seek a default judgment by application to the court. If the divorce is started with a "Summons with Notice" then the grounds will either have to be proven by plaintiff's affidavit, or by testimony at an inquest if the divorce is uncontested or to be granted by default. Uncontested divorces are also granted after the defendant appears and waives the right to answer the complaint. In these cases the defendant neither admits nor denies the plaintiff's allegations, it is up to the plaintiff to prove the allegations by testimony or affidavit in such a case.

== Residency requirements ==
For New York State Supreme Court to have jurisdiction over the parties (see DRL § 230) one of the following residency conditions must be satisfied:

1. The marriage ceremony was performed in New York and either spouse is a resident of the state at the time of the commencement of the action for divorce and resided in the state for a continuous period of one year immediately before the action began.
2. The couple lived as husband and wife in New York and either spouse is a resident of the state at the time of the commencement of the action for divorce and resided in this state for a continuous period of one year immediately before the action began.
3. The grounds for divorce occurred in New York and either spouse is a resident of the state at the time of the commencement of the action for divorce and resided in the state for a continuous period of one year immediately before the action began.
4. The grounds for divorce occurred in New York and both spouses are New York residents at the time the action is commenced.
5. If the parties were married outside of New York and have never lived together as husband and wife in the state and the grounds for divorce did not occur in New York then, one spouse must presently be a resident of New York and have resided continuously in the state for at least two years prior to filing an action for divorce.

Residing "continuously" in the state does not mean that the party can not have left the state during the period of residency nor does it mean that the party does not have another residence elsewhere outside New York.

== Ancillary issues ==
=== Children ===
There are three keys issues when children are involved in a divorce or separation:

1. Child custody - physical custody (where is the child's main residence) and legal custody (who makes decisions about the child) are the two elements of custody. Custody may be joint (shared by consent between the parties) or it may be sole as determined by agreement or by court order. Before custody is awarded the court usually undertakes various investigative steps to determine what is in the best interests of the child or children. If custody is not decided upon by consent (with the court and a court-appointed law guardian representing the child) then a hearing takes place at which both parties present evidence to determine who should have custody in the best interests of the child (or children). The forms for filing for custody and visitation can be found online.
2. Child visitation - the parent who does not have physical custody has either: a) reasonable rights of visitation, b) a specified visitation schedule, or c) is limited to supervised visitation. Only in very rare cases may the non-custodial parent be denied visitation. Usually, this is for very specific reasons such as severe substance abuse, history of domestic violence or lack of interest in the child.
3. Child support - In New York the amount of child support paid by the non-custodial parent to the custodial parent is determined by the state Child Support Standards Act. Based on an adjusted gross income formula the payments are 17% for one child and 25% for two children. There are limits that can be reached for individuals with very low income below the poverty level or very high income (statutorily above $80,000 but usually over $150,000) that will allow for deviations from these percentages. Over and above monthly or weekly child support, the court is also able to award a child support "add-on" for daycare costs if the custodial parent works, educational costs for the child (usually limited to college, not private or religious elementary or high school), and medical expenses, including the cost of medical insurance.

=== Property ===
Equitable distribution is the law in New York that determines the division of property at the end of a marriage. The court examines thirteen factors in determining the fair division of the property that was accumulated during the marriage and the debts of the parties. The courts have routinely held that equal distribution is the norm except in cases of egregious misconduct, or when dealing with businesses, professional licenses, and college & advanced degrees.

=== Spousal support ===
Today alimony is known as "maintenance" or "spousal support." Unlike child support, there is a set formula to calculate spousal support pendente lite ("pending the litigation"), but there is no post judgment formula. A grant of spousal support depends on the facts of the case, such as the disparity between the income of the parties, the duration of the marriage, the health of the parties, and the presence of very young children. In New York, spousal support is rarely granted on a permanent basis, except in cases of physical or mental disability or when the parties are elderly (about 60 years old or older). Generally, it is granted for a set period of time so the other party can get back on their feet after the termination of the marriage. The length of time depends on the facts of the case as the judge sees fit to award.

=== Legal fees ===
When one party to a divorce is unable to afford an attorney that party is allowed to request the court to order the spouse with the greater income or assets to pay all or part of the other spouse's legal fees. These awards can be on a temporary basis at the beginning of the suit or at the end, as the judge sees fit in each case.

=== Name change ===
According to NY Civil Rights Law Section 65, people have the right to choose, and to change, their name without government approval or involvement; thus, people who chose to change their names in connection with marriage do so according to custom, not law. Legally, one can change one's name at any time simply by using this newly chosen name consistently and without an intent to commit fraud. However, to give people easy "legal proof" of a name change made in connection with divorce, every divorce decree mentions the name change option and itself represents legal proof or documentation of any concomitant name change. (A parallel provision in the Domestic Relations Law (Section 15) also renders every marriage certificate legal "proof" of a name change upon marriage (if there is one).)

== See also ==
- Law of New York
- New York divorce coercion gang
