= QB =

QB may refer to:

== Arts and entertainment ==
- Quantum Break, a 2016 video game
- Quest Beat, a video game label
- Quratulain Balouch, Pakistani singer
- Kyubey, antagonist of 2011 anime Puella Magi Madoka Magica

== Places ==
- Qualicum Beach, Vancouver Island, Canada
- Quarry Bay, Hong Kong, China
- Quebec, a Canadian province
- Queens, a borough of New York City, US
  - Queens Boulevard, a highway
  - Queensbridge, Queens, a public housing project

== Science and technology ==
- ATCvet code QB for Blood and blood forming organs, a section of the Anatomical Therapeutic Chemical Classification System
- QuickBASIC, a programming language
- QuickBooks, accounting software
- QBittorrent, a free and open-source BitTorrent client
- Quettabyte, the largest official unit of measurement for digital information.

== Transport ==
- QB (New York City Subway service), a defunct transit service
- Quiet Birdmen, a secret club for male American aviators
- Sky Georgia (IATA:QB)

== Other uses ==
- Quarterback, a position in American and Canadian football
- Queen's Bench (disambiguation), a name of some courts in England, Wales and Canada
- Quiz bowl, an academic quiz game

== See also ==
- Cuby & the Blizzards
- 1992 QB1, the first known classical Kuiper belt object, now named Albion
