= SDI Presence =

American IT company

SDI Presence LLC
- Company type: Privately Held Company
- Industry: IT consulting, managed services
- Founded: 1996
- Headquarters: Chicago, Illinois
- Area served: U.S.
- Key people: David Gupta (Exec Chair) Hardik Bhatt (CEO)
- Number of employees: 370
- Website: sdipresence.com

SDI Presence LLC (commonly referred to as SDI) is an IT consultancy and managed services provider (MSP) that provides technology-based professional services. As of 2024, the firm had more than 350 employees. SDI is a certified Minority Business Enterprise (MBE) with the City of Chicago, the State of Illinois, the National Minority Supplier Development Council (NMSDC) and the California Public Utilities Commission (CPUC). In 2024 SDI was awarded with the NMSDC Supplier of the Year Award – Class IV, as well as the Chicago MSDC Supplier of the Year Class IV. SDI is ranked as a Top Workplace by Built In Chicago, the Chicago Tribune (2018-2024), and Crain's Chicago Business.

== History ==
David A. Gupta founded the company System Development Integration (SDI) in 1996 in Chicago as a spinout from his father's mechanical engineering company, Environmental Systems Design, Inc.; its business was systems integration.

Over the following decades, the firm gained business in its IT systems work in government-run systems, like transportation and public safety, as well as utilities and commercial buildings. The City of Chicago selected SDI for its security technology systems at O'Hare and Midway airports, a paperless permit system in the buildings department, customer service and billing for the water management department, and the City payroll system. The firm's IT-managed services practice added several clients, including large transportation and transit agencies in the Midwest. SDI also continued several community initiatives as it grew, including its First Chance Initiative, which provided hands-on technical internships for Chicago Public School and City Colleges of Chicago students. In 2024 SDI Presence signed a lease as anchor tenant at Xchange Chicago, a first-of-its-kind onshore IT delivery center, in partnership with Chicago's communities, aiming to drive a more inclusive economy through technology.

SDI took on private equity partners between 2008 and 2016, to further expand. The firm was selected to deploy additional mission-critical systems at airports in the U.S. In 2016, Gupta renamed the organization SDI Presence. The company had about 130 employees at that time.

In 2017, the firm acquired NexLevel Information Technology Inc., an IT management consulting firm whose clients include over 200 West Coast government agencies and special districts. The NexLevel consulting team operates under the SDI Presence brand and includes local California senior consultants of municipal/financial leadership in local government and utilities. The team has delivered over 100 IT Assessments/Strategic Plans throughout the West Coast. It also has a long experience in municipal and utility IT systems selection and program management oversight, with a specialization in ERP systems.

As of 2019, the firm further positioned itself as “IT Keepers of Chicago’s Aviation, Transit and Utility Industries” and currently holds an 87% customer satisfaction score across its portfolio of clients.

In 2019, SDI also expanded its MBE partner network through Chicago United's Five Forward Initiative and spent $11M with its diverse minority/women/veteran-owned partner companies in 2019. As part of its focus on Diversity, Equity and Inclusion (DE&I), SDI projects spending $100M with its minority, women and veteran-owned business partners by the end of 2026.

The firm secured a minority investment from Abry Partners, a Boston-based sector-focused private equity firm, in 2021. The investment will fund the firm's continued growth in government, utility and private sector technology markets through acquisitions and organic expansion of its footprint nationally. In late 2021, SDI acquired California-based Scientia Consulting Group, furthering its presence on the West Coast and building out its cloud and managed services offerings.
