= QVH =

QVH or qvh may refer to:

- Queen Victoria Hospital, a hospital in East Grinstead, West Sussex, England
- Queen Victoria Hospital, Melbourne, (1896-1987) a former women's hospital in Melbourne, Australia
- qvh, the ISO 639-3 code for Huamalíes y Norte de Dos de Mayo Quechua language, Peru
