= Quantum cascade detector =

Photodetector sensitive to infrared radiation

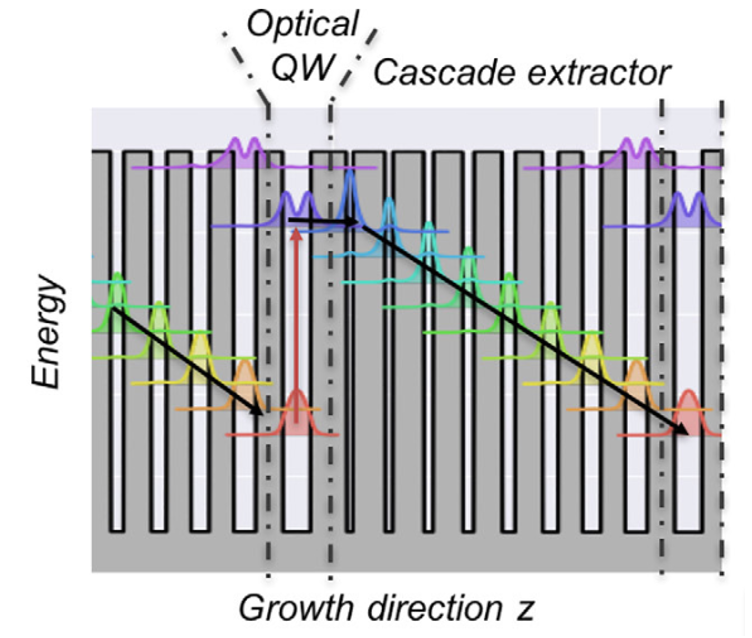
Typical bandstructure of one period of a QCD. The optical quantum well hosts the photon-induced electronic transition. The adjacent wells are designed to extract the photoexcited electrons from the optical well and to cascade them into the next period.

A quantum cascade detector (QCD) is a photodetector sensitive to infrared radiation. The absorption of incident light is mediated by intersubband transitions in a semiconductor multiple-quantum-well structure. The term cascade refers to the characteristic path of the electrons inside the material bandstructure, induced by absorption of incident light.

QCDs are realized by stacking thin layers of semiconductors on a lattice-matched substrate by means of suitable epitaxial deposition processes, including molecular-beam epitaxy and metal organic vapor-phase epitaxy. The design of the quantum wells can be engineered to tune the absorption in a wide range of wavelengths in the infrared spectrum and to achieve broadband operation: QCDs have been demonstrated to operate from the short-wave to the long-wave infrared region and beyond. QCDs operate in photovoltaic mode, meaning that no bias is required to generate a photoresponse. For this reason, QCDs are also referred to as the photovoltaic counterpart of the photoconductive quantum well infrared photodetectors (QWIPs).

Since the vibrational modes of organic molecules are found in the mid-infrared region of the spectrum, QCDs are investigated for sensing applications and integration in dual-comb spectroscopic systems. Moreover, QCDs have been shown to be promising for high-speed operation in free-space communication applications.

== History ==
In 2002, Daniel Hofstetter, Mattias Beck and Jérôme Faist reported the first ever use of an InGaAs/InAlAs quantum-cascade-laser structure for photodetection at room temperature. The specific detectivity of the device was shown to be comparable to the detectivity of more established detectors at the time, such as QWIPs or HgCdTe detectors. This pioneering work stimulated the search for bi-functional optoelectronic devices embedding both lasing and detection within the same photonic architecture.

The term quantum cascade detector was coined in 2004, when L. Gendron and V. Berger demonstrated the first operating cascade device fully devoted to photodetection purposes, employing a GaAs/AlGaAs heterostructure. This work was motivated by the necessity to find an alternative intersubband infrared photodetector to QWIPs. Indeed, while manifesting high responsivity enhanced by photoconductive gain, QWIPs suffer from large dark current noise, which is detrimental to in room-temperature photodetection.

In the subsequent years researchers have explored a variety of solutions leading to an enhancement of the device performances and functionalities. New material platforms have been studied, such as II-VI ZnCdSe/ZnCdMgSe semiconductor systems. These compounds are characterized by a large conduction band offset, allowing for broadband and room-temperature photodetection. Moreover, QCDs based on GaN/AlGaN and ZnO/MgZnO material platforms have also been reported with the aim to investigate photodetection operation at the very edges of the infrared spectrum.

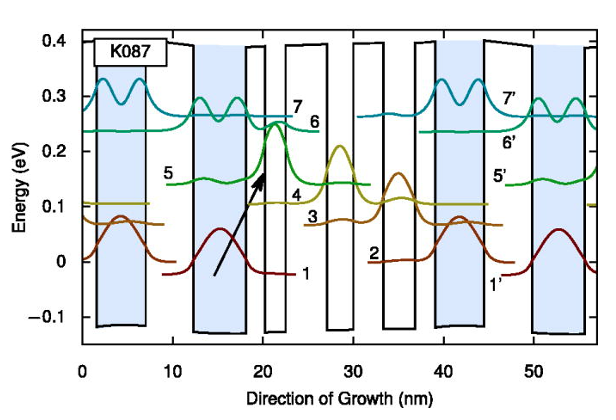
Diagonal-transition QCD bandstructure. The black arrow highlights the path of the electron, which transits from the ground state of the optical well directly into the adjacent well in the extraction region.

Innovative architectures have been designed and fabricated. Diagonal-transition quantum cascade detectors have been proposed to improve the mechanism of electronic extraction from the optical well. While in conventional QCDs the transition is hosted in a single well (vertical transition), in diagonal-transition QCDs the photoexcitation takes place in two adjacent wells, in a bound-to-bound or bound-to-miniband transition scheme. The motivation behind the realization of this architecture lies in the opportunity to improve the extraction efficiency towards the cascade, even though at the expense of the absorption strength of the transition. Since early 2000s up to more recent years, QCDs embedded in optical cavities operating in the strong light–matter interaction regime have been investigated, aiming to further improvement of the device performances.

== Working principle ==
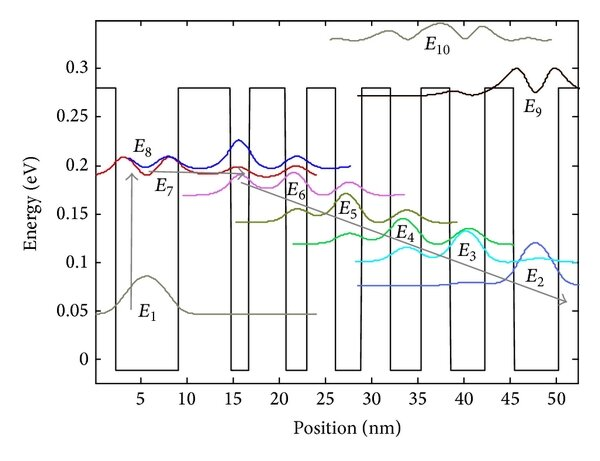
Calculated QCD bandstructure. The optical well is the thickest and confines three electronic states. A photon is here absorbed, inducing carrier displacement through the cascade. Notice that, in a period, the thickness of the quantum wells becomes larger, so that states are more and more confined.

QCDs are unipolar devices, meaning that only a single type of charge carrier, either electrons or holes, contributes to the photocurrent. The structure of a QCD consists of a periodic multiple-quantum-well heterostructure, realized by stacking very thin layers of semiconductors characterized by different energy band-gaps. In each period, the first quantum well (also called optical well) is devoted to the resonant absorption of incident radiation. Upon absorption of a photon, an electron is excited from a lower state to an upper state. Since these states are confined within the same band, intersubband transitions occur and QCDs are also referred to as intersubband devices. The transition energy can be tuned by adjusting the thickness of the well: indeed, the energy of an electronic state confined in a quantum well can be written as:

$E_{n}(\bold{k})=\frac{\hbar^{2}(k_{x}^{2}+k_{y}^{2})}{2m^{*}_{e}}+\frac{\pi^{2}\hbar^{2}}{2m^{*}_{e}W^{2}}n^{2},$

within the approximation of infinite potential barriers. It can be derived by solving the Schrödinger equation for an electron confined in a one-dimensional infinite barrier potential. In the formula, $\hbar$ is the reduced Planck constant, $\bold{k}$ and $m_{e}^{*}$ represent the wavevector and the effective mass of the electron, respectively, while $W$ is the thickness of the quantum well and $n$ identifies the $n$^{th} confined state. The well thickness can be tuned in order to engineer the bandstructure of the QCD.

The photoexcited electron is then transferred to a cascade of confined states called extraction region. The transfer mechanism between adjacent wells consists of a double-step process: quantum tunneling transfers the electron through the barrier and scattering with longitudinal optical (LO) phonons relaxes the electron to the ground state. This mechanism is very efficient if the energy difference between adjacent confined states matches the typical LO phonon energy, a condition that is easily achievable by tuning the thickness of the wells. It also sets the cut-off frequency of the detector, being the process that determines the transit time of the electron through the cascade. Since typical time-scales for LO phonon scattering are in the $ps$ range, the QCD cut-off frequency lies in the 100 $GHz$ range. When the electron reaches the bottom of the cascade, it is confined in the optical well of the next period, where it is once again photoexcited. A displacement current is then generated, and it can be easily measured by a read-out circuit. Notice that the generation of a photocurrent does not require the application of an external bias and, consistently, the energy bands are flat.

=== Figure of merit ===
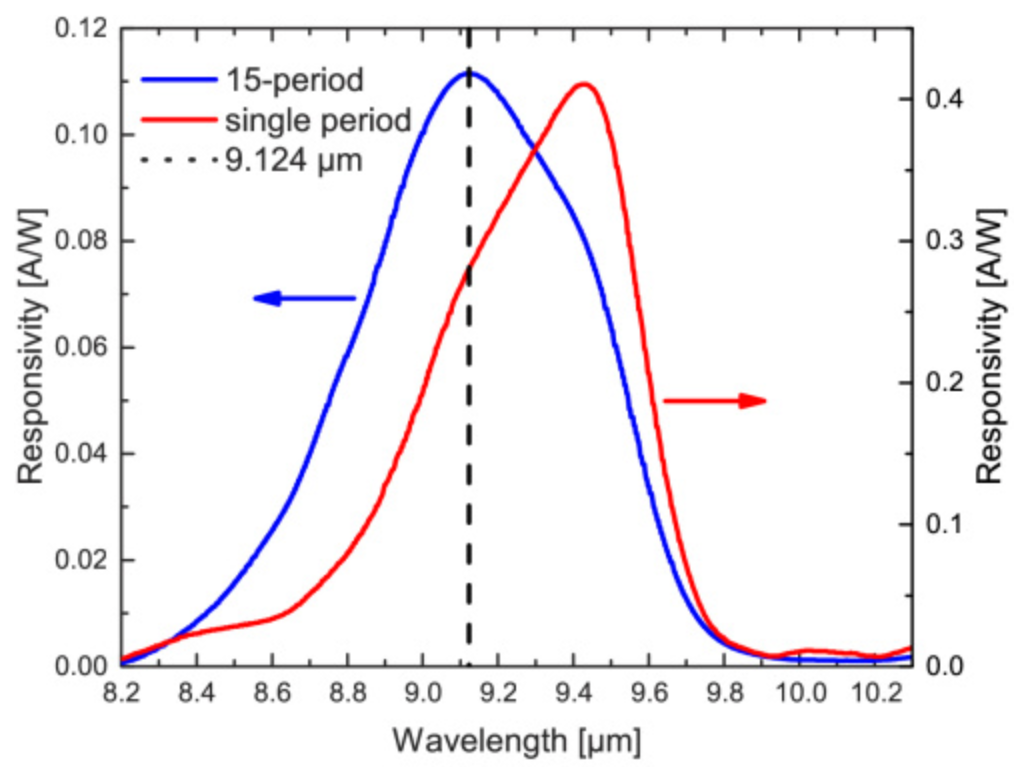
Experimental responsivity spectra. Responsivity was measured on InGaAs/InAlAs systems differing from the number of periods and at room temperature.

The responsivity $R(\lambda)$ of any quantum photodetector can be calculated exploiting the following formula: $R(\lambda)=\frac{\eta\lambda e}{hc}$, where the constant $e$ is the electronic charge, $\lambda$ represents the radiation wavelength, $h$ is the Planck constant, $c$ refers to the speed of light in vacuum and $\eta$ is the external quantum efficiency. This last term takes into account both the absorption efficiency $\eta_{abs}$, i.e. the probability of photoexciting an electron, and the photodetector gain $g$, which measures the number of electrons contributing to the photocurrent per absorbed photon, according to $\eta=\eta_{abs}g$. The photodetector gain depends on the working principle of the photodetector; in a QCD, it is proportional to the extraction probability $p_{e}$: $g=\frac{p_{e}}{N}$, where $N$ is the number of active periods. The responsivity reads:

$R(\lambda)=\eta_{abs}\frac{p_{e}}{N}\frac{\lambda e}{hc}$.

In first approximation, in weakly-absorbing systems, the absorption efficiency $\eta_{abs}$ is a linear function of $N$ and the responsivity is independent from the number of periods. In other systems an optimal trade-off between absorption efficiency and gain must be found to maximize the responsivity. At the state of the art, QCDs have been demonstrated to have a responsivity in the order of hundreds of $\frac{mA}{W}$. Another figure of merit for photodetectors is the specific detectivity $D^{*}$, since it facilitates the comparison between devices with different area $A$ and bandwidth $\Delta f$. At sufficiently high temperature, where detectivity is dominated by Johnson noise, it can be calculated as:

$D^{*}=R_{p}\sqrt{\frac{R_{0}A}{4K_{b}T}}$,

where $R_{p}$ is the peak responsivity, $R_{0}$ is the resistance at zero bias, $K_{b}$ is the Boltzmann constant and $T$ is temperature. Enhancement of the detectivity is accomplished by high resistance, strong absorption and large extraction probability.

== Optical coupling ==
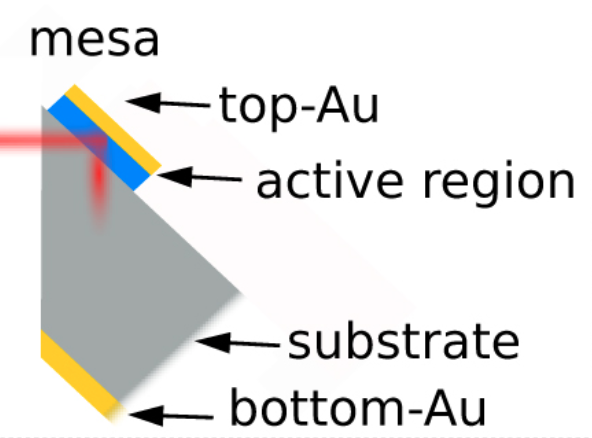
45°-facet double-pass geometry.

As any intersubband detector, QCDs can absorb only TM-polarized light, while they are blind to vertically incident radiation. This behavior is predicted by intersubband transition selection rules, which show that a non-zero matrix element is obtained on the condition of light polarized perpendicularly to quantum well planes. Consequently, alternative approaches to couple light into the active region of QCDs have been developed, including a variety of geometrical coupling configurations, diffraction gratings and mode confinement solutions.

=== 45°-wedge-multipass configuration ===
Incident light impinges vertically on a 45° polished facet of a wedge-like QCD. In this coupling configuration, radiation contains both TM and TE polarizations. While this configuration is easily realized, 50% of the power is not coupled to the device, and the amount of absorbed light is strongly reduced. However, it is regarded as a standard configuration to characterize intersubband photodetectors.

=== Brewster angle configuration ===
At the air-semiconductor interface, p-polarized light is fully transmitted if radiation is impinged at the Brewster angle $\theta_{B}$, which is a function of the semiconductor refractive index $n_{s}$, since $\theta_{B}=arctan({\frac{1}{n_{s}}})$. This is the simplest configuration, since no tilted facets are required. However, due to the high refractive index difference at the interface, only a small fraction of the total optical input power couples to the detector.

=== Diffraction grating couplers ===
A metallic diffraction grating is patterned on top of the device to couple the impinging light to surface plasmon polaritons, a type of surface wave that propagates along the metal-semiconductor interface. Being TM-polarized, surface plasmon polaritons are compatible with intersubband device operation, but typically propagates only over 10 periods of the structure.

=== Waveguide end-fire coupling ===
Planar or ridge waveguides are employed to confine the optical mode in the active region of the QCD, provided that the semiconductor heterostructure is grown on a substrate exhibiting a lower refractive index. The optical mode, indeed, is guided towards the region of highest refractive index. This is the case of InP-matched InGaAs/AlGaAs heterostructures. The absorption efficiency is limited by waveguide losses, approximately in the order of 1 $\frac{dB}{cm}$.

== See also ==
- Semiconductor material
- II-VI semiconductor compound
- Photodetector
- Optoelectronics
- Infrared spectroscopy
- Photonic integrated circuit
