= QFE =

QFE is a three letter acronym which can have meanings in aviation, in software development, and in network usage. It can refer to

- QFE, a Q code used by pilots and air traffic controllers that refers to atmospheric pressure and altimeter settings
- Quick Fix Engineering, also known as "hotfix".
- Quoted for emphasis, used on internet forums when someone wants to reiterate a previously-made point.
- Qualifying Financial Entities, are companies or organisations that are registered on the Financial Service Providers Register in New Zealand.
