= QPR Software =

Finnish software company

- Company type: Publicly listed company
- Traded as: Nasdaq Helsinki: QPR1V
- Industry: Process Mining, Enterprise architecture, Software modeling, Software development, Consulting
- Founded: 1991
- Headquarters: Helsinki, Finland
- Area served: Over 50 countries
- Products: QPR ProcessAnalyzer, QPR EnterpriseArchitect, QPR ProcessDesigner; QPR Metrics
- Number of employees: 30-50
- Website: www.qpr.com

QPR Software Plc is a Finnish software firm providing management software products in process mining, process and enterprise architecture modelling, and performance management. Founded in 1991 and headquartered in Helsinki, QPR Software is listed on the Helsinki Stock Exchange.

== Products ==
- QPR Process Analyzer, an enterprise-grade software product for advanced process mining
- QPR Enterprise Architect, enterprise architecture modeling software
- QPR Metrics, a tool for measuring strategy execution and performance management, also supporting balanced scorecard methodology
- QPR Process Designer, a tool for quality assurance, business process modelling and Six Sigma software packages
