= Q4 =

Q4, Q-4 or q4 may refer to:

- The fourth quarter of a calendar year
- The fourth quarter of a fiscal year
- Q4 (New York City bus), a bus line in Queens
- Quake 4, a first-person shooter video game developed by Raven Software
- Audi Q4 e-tron, a compact SUV
- Swazi Express Airways IATA airline designator
- Alfa Romeos All Wheel Drive (AWD) system
- LNER Class Q4, a class of British steam locomotives
- The Cunard Line codename for the ship later named Queen Elizabeth 2
- A shortened name for Section 4, a part of Co-op City
- An abbreviation for "quaque four" (every four) used in medical prescriptions
- "Quran 4", the 4th chapter of the Islamic Holy book

== See also ==
- 4Q (disambiguation)
