= Quantum cellular automaton =

Abstract model of quantum computation

A quantum cellular automaton (QCA) is an abstract model of quantum computation, devised in analogy to conventional models of cellular automata introduced by John von Neumann.

The same name may also refer to quantum dot cellular automata, which are a proposed physical implementation of "classical" cellular automata by exploiting quantum mechanical phenomena. QCA have attracted attention in nanofabrication, due to its extremely small feature size (at the molecular or even atomic scale) and ultra-low power consumption. This makes it a candidate for replacing CMOS technology.

== Usage of the term ==
In the context of models of computation or of physical systems, quantum cellular automaton refers to the merger of elements of both (1) the study of cellular automata in conventional computer science and (2) the study of quantum information processing. In particular, the following are features of models of quantum cellular automata:

- The computation is considered to come about by parallel operation of multiple computing devices, or cells. The cells are usually taken to be identical, finite-dimensional quantum systems (e.g. each cell is a qubit).
- Each cell has a neighborhood of other cells. Altogether these form a network of cells, which is usually taken to be regular (e.g. the cells are arranged as a lattice with or without periodic boundary conditions).
- The evolution of all of the cells has a number of physics-like symmetries. Locality is one: the next state of a cell depends only on its current state and that of its neighbours. Homogeneity is another: the evolution acts the same everywhere, and is independent of time.
- The state space of the cells, and the operations performed on them, should be motivated by principles of quantum mechanics.

Another feature that is often considered important for a model of quantum cellular automata is that it should be universal for quantum computation (i.e. that it can efficiently simulate quantum Turing machines, some arbitrary quantum circuit or simply all other quantum cellular automata).

Models which have been proposed recently impose further conditions, e.g. that quantum cellular automata should be reversible and/or locally unitary, and have an easily determined global transition function from the rule for updating individual cells. Recent results show that these properties can be derived axiomatically, from the symmetries of the global evolution.

== Models ==
=== Early proposals ===
In 1982, Richard Feynman suggested an initial approach to quantizing a model of cellular automata. In 1985, David Deutsch presented a formal development of the subject. Later, Gerhard Grössing and Anton Zeilinger introduced the term "quantum cellular automata" to refer to a model they defined in 1988, although their model had very little in common with the concepts developed by Deutsch and so has not been developed significantly as a model of computation.

=== Models of universal quantum computation ===
The first formal model of quantum cellular automata to be researched in depth was that introduced by John Watrous. This model was developed further by Wim van Dam, as well as Christoph Dürr, Huong LêThanh, and Miklos Santha, Jozef Gruska. and Pablo Arrighi. However it was later realised that this definition was too loose, in the sense that some instances of it allow superluminal signalling. A second wave of models includes those of Susanne Richter and Reinhard Werner, of Benjamin Schumacher and Reinhard Werner, of Carlos Pérez-Delgado and Donny Cheung, and of Pablo Arrighi, Vincent Nesme and Reinhard Werner. These are all closely related, and do not suffer any such locality issue. In the end one can say that they all agree to picture quantum cellular automata as just some large quantum circuit, infinitely repeating across time and space. Recent reviews of the topic are available here.

=== Models of physical systems ===
Models of quantum cellular automata have been proposed by David Meyer, Bruce Boghosian and Washington Taylor, and Peter Love and Bruce Boghosian as a means of simulating quantum lattice gases, motivated by the use of "classical" cellular automata to model classical physical phenomena such as gas dispersion. Criteria determining when a quantum cellular automaton (QCA) can be described as quantum lattice gas automaton (QLGA) were given by Asif Shakeel and Peter Love.

=== Quantum dot cellular automata ===
A proposal for implementing classical cellular automata by systems designed with quantum dots has been proposed under the name "quantum cellular automata" by Doug Tougaw and Craig Lent, as a replacement for classical computation using CMOS technology. In order to better differentiate between this proposal and models of cellular automata which perform quantum computation, many authors working on this subject now refer to it as "quantum dot cellular automaton".

=== Models of particle physics ===
Many QCAs that simulate quantum field theories in the continuum limit have been devised, and some of them are variants of QCAs on fermionic cells—the so-called Fermionic Cellular Automata (FCA). The simplest ones are Dirac QCAs that, for low-momentum and low mass regime, behave like a Dirac particle. The massless version of one of the Dirac QCAs, also known as Weyl QCA, was shown to reproduce the dynamics and statistics of the electromagnetic field in vacuum. Some other QCAs that simulate quantum electrodynamics have also been constructed. However, there remain some problems with these models. For instance, it is not clear how to define a free Dirac vacuum in such models that is stable.

== See also ==
- Quantum finite automata – Quantum analog of probabilistic automata
- Quantum Hall effect – Electromagnetic effect in physics
