= SDI Tools =

- SDI Tools: TRIZ Tool Interface
- Developers: Statistical Design Institute, LLC
- Stable release: 4.11 / Sep-2018
- Operating system: Windows
- Type: Statistical analysis
- License: proprietary
- Website: www.stat-design.com

SDI Tools is a set of commercial software add-in tools for Microsoft Excel developed and distributed by Statistical Design Institute, LLC., a privately owned company located in Texas, United States.

SDI Tools were first developed in 2000 by Dr. George Chollar, Dr. Jesse Peplinski, and Garron Morris as several Add-Ins for Microsoft Excel to support a methodology for product development that combined elements of Design for Six Sigma and systems engineering

Today, SDI Tools are split into two main Microsoft Excel Add-Ins called Triptych and Apogee.

== Application of SDI Tools ==
SDI Tools are typically used in Six Sigma training, industry, and academic research

== See also ==
- List of Six Sigma software packages
