= ZQ =

ZQ or Zq may refer to:

== Arts and media ==
- XHZQ-FM, a radio station in Tabasco, Mexico
- Zainab Qayyum (born 1975), Pakistani actress and television host
- ZQ, a character from Dude Bro Party Massacre III, a 2015 film

== Science and technology ==
- Sharp Wizard (non-US model series: ZQ), electronic organizer
- ZhuQue, a series of rockets by LandSpace
- Zq, the molecular Hamiltonian charge of a nucleus

== Other uses ==
- Ark Airways (IATA code: ZQ), an Armenian cargo airline
- German Airways (former IATA code: ZQ), a 1980–2020 regional airline
- United Kingdom (ITU prefix: ZQ), in broadcasting

== See also ==
- ZQGame, Chinese videogame company
