= Spiritual Directors International =

Educational nonprofit organization that supports professional spiritual direction

Spiritual Directors International (SDI) is an educational nonprofit organization that supports professional spiritual direction and spiritual companionship.

== History ==
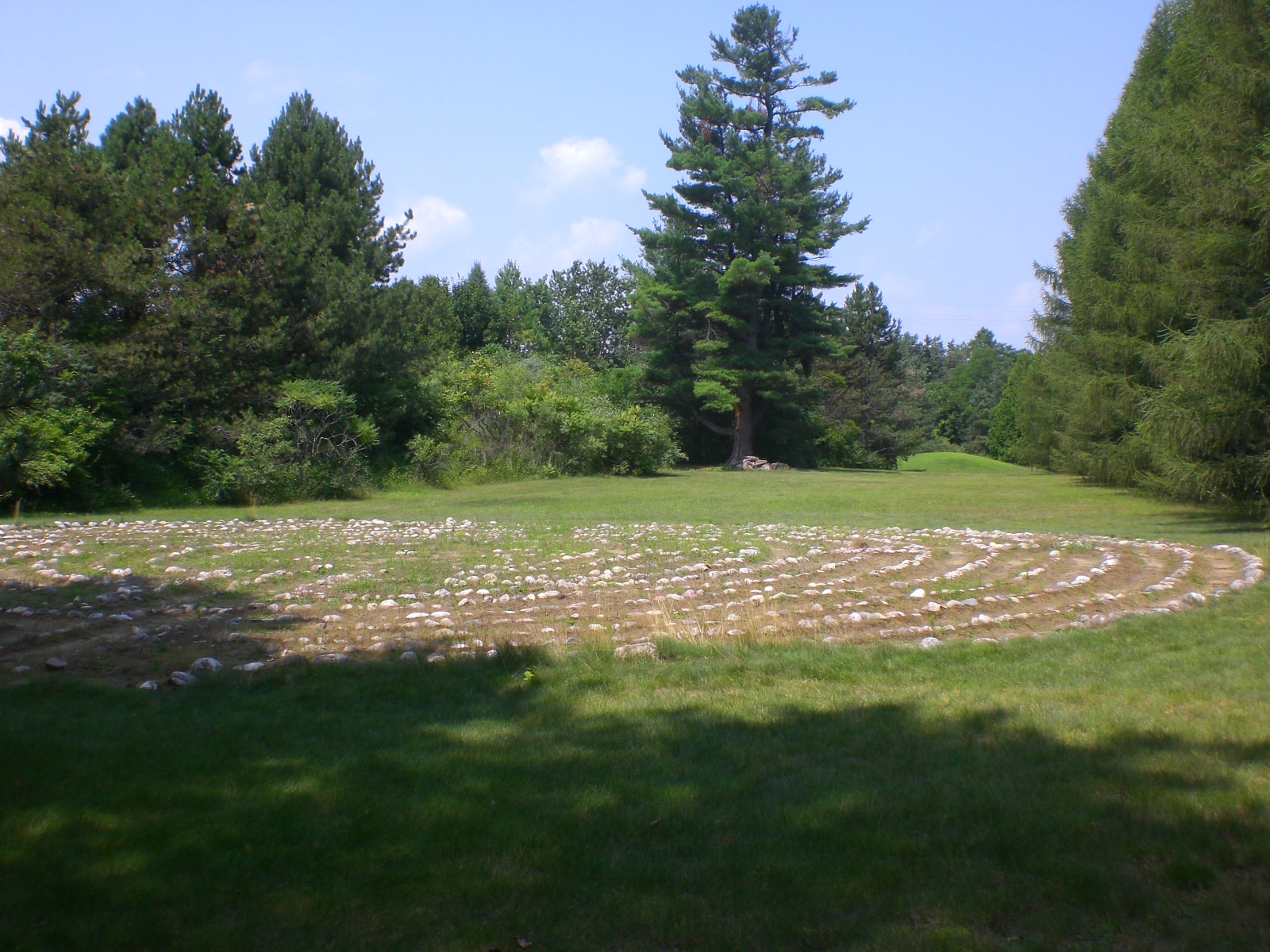
Labyrinth in the grounds of Manresa Jesuit Spirituality Renewal Centre

Spiritual Directors International (SDI) was formed in 1990 to support the work of professionals who work as spiritual directors. This support happens across religious or spiritual traditions, as the professionalization of this field of practice increasingly involves those who work outside of or without the support of a traditional religious community. As this expansion of serving the function of a "spiritual midwife" continues, SDI supports the establishment of best practices while promoting minimum standards for the practice of spiritual direction or spiritual companionship, including deep or holy listening and hospitality.

SDI is an IRS 501(c)(3) charitable organization.

== Service to the profession ==
Spiritual Directors International provides an online repository to match those who wish to receive spiritual direction, or seekers, with those who provide this form of spiritual companionship. As an organization, it supports its members on their own professional paths, without imposing any single belief system, professional certification, or license.

Those who provide this work, and the membership audience, are laypeople and ordained ministers, who together receive ongoing education and communal support through SDI. Spiritual Directors, also known as spiritual companions or spiritual guides, are not found exclusively within any faith tradition, as they include many interfaith practitioners. As such, SDI is nondenominational in its membership and approach to this work.

While most who work as spiritual directors do not do that in a full-time capacity, as a professional area of practice, those who work in this area do use this as one aspect of their making a living.

== See also ==
- Spiritual direction
- Spiritual Exercises of Ignatius of Loyola
- Spirituality
