= List of medical abbreviations: Q =

Abbreviation	Meaning
q	each, every (from Latin quaque)
q15	every 15 minutes
q6h q6°	once every 6 hours
q2wk	once every 2 weeks
qAc	Before every meal (from Latin quaque ante cibum)
q.a.d.	every other day (from Latin quaque altera die)
QALY	quality-adjusted life year
q.AM	every day before noon (from Latin quaque die ante meridiem)
q.d.	every day (from Latin quaque die)
q.d.s.	four times each day (from Latin quater die sumendus)
q.h.	each hour (from Latin quaque hora)
q.h.s.	every bedtime (from Latin quaque hora somni)
q.i.d.	four times each day (from Latin quater in die) (not deprecated, but consider using "four times a day" instead. See the do-not-use list)
QIDS	Quick Inventory of Depressive Symptoms
q.l.	as much as you like (from Latin quantum libet)
q.m.t. also qm	every month
q.n.	every night
QNS q.n.s.	quantity not sufficient
q.o.d.	every other day (from Latin quaque altera die) (deprecated; use "every other day" instead. See the do-not-use list)
QOF	Quality and Outcomes Framework (system for payment of GPs in the UK National Health Service)
q.o.h.	every other hour
q.s.	as much as suffices (from Latin quantum satis or quantum sufficit)
qt	quart
q.v.	which see (from Latin quod vide); as much as you please (from Latin quantum vis)
q.wk. also qw	weekly (once a week)
