= Marital deduction =

Marital deduction is a law within US tax law that allows a person to give assets to their spouse with reduced or no tax imposed upon the transfer. Some marital deduction laws apply to transfers made postmortem. A decree of divorce transfers the rights to that property by reason of the marriage and is also a transfer within a marriage. It makes no difference whether the property itself or equivalent compensation is transferred before, or after the decree dissolves the marriage. There is no U.S. estate and gift tax on transfers of any amount between spouses, whether during their lifetime or at death. There is an important exception for non-citizens. The U.S. federal Estate and gift tax marital deduction is only available if the surviving spouse is a U.S. citizen. For a surviving spouse who is not a U.S. citizen a bequest through a Qualified Domestic Trust defers estate tax until principal is distributed by the trustee, a U.S. citizen or corporation who also withholds the estate tax. Income on principal distributed to the surviving spouse is taxed as individual income. If the surviving spouse becomes a U.S. citizen, principal remaining in a Qualifying Domestic Trust may then be distributed without further tax.

== Background ==
The American taxation system began when President Abraham Lincoln imposed taxes to fund the revenue required for the Civil War. After much debate, America revoked its tax system until 1894 when the Wilson Tariff Act was enacted. Half a century later, deductions were formed through legislation. Now, America maintains a federal, state, and local taxation system.

On March 1, 1994, legislators defined martial deductions under Section § 20.2056(a)-(1) as allowing a decedent's surviving spouse to deduct the value of any property interest that passes to them from their gross estate if the interest is a deductible interest. See § 20.2056(a)-(2) to determine if the interest is a deductible interest.

=== Credits v. Deductions ===
Over time, tax credits were established in addition to tax deductions. Deductions are transfers between spouses that last a lifetime and are appointed by will which are eligible for a deduction on the federal tax form. Credits are the sum deducted from one's payment owed to the federal, state, or local entity. Credits allow taxpayers to pay less in taxes, while deductions can reduce taxable income. Credits are more preferable, but taxpayers are more likely to receive deductions than credits. Taxpayers may receive deductions for home, medical, and educational expenses; while credits may include earned income tax credits, child care/dependent credits, and individual retirement arrangements. See the table below for an illustrative explanation.

Would you prefer a tax credit or deduction?
	$10,000 tax deduction	$10,000 tax credit
Your Adjusted Gross Income	$100,000	$100,000
Less: tax deduction	($10,000)	
Taxable income	$90,000	$100,000
Tax rate	25%	25%
Calculated tax	$22,500	$25,000
Less: tax credit		($10,000)
Estimated tax bill	$22,500	$15,000

== Litigation ==
=== Requirements for the Deduction ===
Gifts from a spouse may be eligible for marital deductions if the following requirements are met: (1) marital status requirement; (2) citizenship requirement; and (3) the interest must not conclude due to the cause of a certain event or after a specified amount of time has passed.

To satisfy the marital status requirement, the couple must be spouses. The husband and wife must be married to one another, and this does not include domestic partners or civil unions. The citizenship requirement allows some exceptions for foreign marriages, but for those who are American citizens you must be legally married in a state. Additionally, the donee (the person receiving the property) must be a United States citizen unless the gift was made before 1992 and resulting from a joint and survivor annuity. Finally, the spouse gifting the property must gift the property, in its entirety and with full control, to the receiving spouse without any restrictions or conditions for the deduction to apply.

=== During Marriage ===
Marital deduction, often referred to as gift to spouse, is a type of deduction that allows a person to give his or her spouse a gift with reduced or no tax imposed upon the transfer, for transfers given in a calendar year. Some marital deduction laws even apply to transfers made postmortem. The right to receive property conveys ownership for tax purposes. To qualify for marital deductions the couple must be married. This includes same-sex marriages. If a same-sex couple is married, but resides in a state that does not recognize same-sex marriage the marital deduction will still apply, so long as the couple is legally married in a state that permits same-sex marriage.

=== Divorce ===
Divorces are tedious and may not begin or conclude amicably. However, it is imperative that both spouses confirm the validity of the divorce decree before remarrying. In the case of Estate of Goldwater, a husband remarried without first confirming the validity of his divorce in his previous marriage and once he died his first wife received the marital deduction and most of the property left by the husband because she was legally his wife.

Estate of Goldwater Case

A decree of divorce transfers the right to property by reason of the marriage and is also a transfer within a marriage. It makes no difference whether the property itself or equivalent compensation is transferred before, or after the decree dissolves the marriage. The most important aspect of a divorce, involving federal income tax, is confirming that the divorce is valid. In Estate of Goldwater, Leo and Gertrude were married in 1946 and 10 years later the two separated. Gertrude was awarded a final decree of separation in December 1956 at New York Supreme Court. Two years later, Leo obtained a Mexico divorce decree from Gertrude without her appearance. In response, Gertrude sought declaratory judgment decreeing the invalidity of the Mexican divorce and sought to permanently enjoin Leo from remarrying in New York or anywhere else. Initially, Gertrude was granted with a temporary injunction against Leo remarrying in New York or elsewhere, but Leo filed a cross-motion. On December 9, 1958, the New York Supreme Court dismissed the second cause of action and dismissed the temporary injunction. Prior to the dismissal, Lee submitted an affidavit admitting that the Mexican divorce was invalid, but that matter was not revisited. However, on that same day the New York Supreme Court made their decision to dismiss the temporary injunction, Leo remarried a woman named Lee in Connecticut. After the ruling, neither party appealed resulting in a final judgment Thereafter, Leo lived with Lee until his demise on February 21, 1968. Soon after Leo's death, Gertrude filed a notice to take an elective share share of Lee's estate pursuant to New York's right to election by surviving spouse. In short, Gertrude was given the marital deduction, but Lee did not because Lee did not qualify as a surviving spouse according to the law. Any property left to Lee could not receive the tax benefits of a marital deduction because Lee was not Leo's surviving spouse. In sum, if you are married it is in your best interest and your new partners best interest to ensure that your previous marriage ended with a final, valid divorce decree before remarrying or leaving property to your significant other with hopes of marital deductions.

=== At Death ===
There is no U.S. estate and gift tax on transfers of any amount between spouses at death. The transfer must be given to surviving spouse to obtain a deduction. Additionally, there are exceptions for individuals who are not citizens of the United States of America. The U.S. federal estate and gift tax marital deduction is only available if the surviving spouse is a U.S. citizen. For a surviving spouse who is not a U.S. citizen, a bequest through a Qualified Domestic Trust defers estate tax until the principal is distributed by the trustee, a U.S. citizen or corporation who also withholds the estate tax. Income on principal distributed to the surviving spouse is taxed as individual income. If the surviving spouse becomes a U.S. citizen, principal remaining in a Qualifying Domestic Trust may then be distributed without further tax.

=== Limitations on Marital Deductions ===
Marital deductions have no number of limits in a calendar year. One of the most important aspects of estate planning is making use of the unlimited marital deduction. All of the property transferred from one spouse to the other is able to receive the marital deduction. For example, if at the beginning of the year your husband gifts you property, then gifts property again for your birthday, and again for Christmas you will be able to apply the marital deduction on each property received. However, the recipient of the gift may not receive double deductions. For example, if a spouses receives property and applies the marital deduction the spouse may not donate the property to charity and receive a charitable deduction as well. Only one deduction will apply.
