= QPS =

QPS may refer to:

== Computing ==
- Quark Publishing System, a collaborative workflow management system
- Queries per second, a measure of high-load servers' performance

== Organisations ==
- Queensland Police Service, Australia
- Quaker Peace and Service, former name of Quaker Peace and Social Witness, a UK Quakers organisation committee
- Quincy Public Schools, Massachusetts, US

== Technology ==
- Quality Performance System
