= QS =

QS may refer to:

== Business ==
- QS mark (for "quality and safety"), on Chinese products
- Quacquarelli Symonds, an education and careers networking company
  - QS World University Rankings, an annual publication
- Quality System (QS) Regulation, a business process
- Quantity surveyor, a professional in the construction industry concerned with costs and contracts
- Travel Service (IATA airline designator QS)
- Quadraphonic sound, the Sansui QS Regular Matrix system

== Politics ==
- Québec solidaire, a political party in Quebec, Canada
- Quis separabit?, an Irish Loyalist motto

== Science, technology, and mathematics ==
=== Biology and medicine ===
- ATCvet code QS Sensory organs, a section of the Anatomical Therapeutic Chemical Classification System for veterinary medicinal products
- Quantum satis, a Latin term meaning "the amount which is needed", used in food and drug regulation
- Quinolinate synthase, an enzyme
- Quorum sensing, a system of interaction in natural and synthetic populations

=== Computing and mathematics ===
- Quadratic sieve, an integer factorization algorithm
- Quality Score, a variable used by search engines to set the rank and cost of ads
- Quicksort, a sorting algorithm

=== Other uses in science and technology ===
- Quadraphonic sound, or "Quadphonic Synthesizer", a matrix quadraphonic gramophone record format developed by Sansui
- Quantified self, a movement to incorporate technology into data acquisition on aspects of a person's daily life
- Quicksand, a colloid hydrogel consisting of fine granular material and water

== Sport ==
- Quality start, a baseball statistic calculated for starting pitchers
- Qualcomm Stadium, a stadium in San Diego, California

== Other uses ==
- Qualifications Scotland, a Scottish Government public body
- Queen's Scout, a scout who has attained the Queen's Scout Award
- Queen's Serjeant, an obsolete legal position in the United Kingdom

== See also ==
- Cue (disambiguation)
- Q (disambiguation)
- Queue (disambiguation)
- QZ (disambiguation)
- SQ (disambiguation)
