= QR =

QR may refer to:

== Arts and entertainment ==
- Nippon Cultural Broadcasting (from call sign JOQR), a Tokyo radio station
- Queen's Radio, a student radio station at Queen's University, Belfast
- Quiet Riot, an American rock band

== Businesses ==
- Qatar Airways (IATA code)
- Queensland Rail, a company responsible for the railway system in Queensland, Australia
- Quintana Roo (company), a triathlon-specific wetsuit and bicycle company

== Places ==
- Quintana Roo, a state of Mexico
- Karakalpakstan (Qoraqalpog'iston Respublikasi), Uzbekistan (ISO 3166-2 subcode UZ-QR)

== Science and technology ==
- QR code (Quick Response code), a two-dimensional code
- ATCvet code QR Respiratory system, a section of the Anatomical Therapeutic Chemical Classification System for veterinary medicinal products
- DICOM Q/R, DICOM Query / Retrieve
- Nissan QR engine
- Quarter (unit)
  - qr., Quarter (unit) § Length, 1/4 of a yard, equal to 9 inches
  - qr. av., Quarter (unit) § Weight, 1/4 of a hundredweight, equal to 2 stone or 28 pounds avoirdupois

=== Mathematics ===
- QR decomposition, a decomposition of a matrix
  - QR algorithm, an eigenvalue algorithm to perform QR decomposition
- Quadratic reciprocity, a theorem from modular arithmetic
- Quasireversibility, a property of some queues
- Reaction quotient (Q_{r}), a function of the activities or concentrations of the chemical species involved in a chemical reaction

== Other uses ==
- Quarterly Review, a defunct literary and political periodical
- Qatari riyal, the currency of Qatar

== See also ==
- QRS (disambiguation)
