= QK =

QK may refer to:

- QK, the IATA designator for Jazz (airline)
- QK, the Library of Congress Classification for botany
- QK-77, a variation of Khorasan wheat or Kamut
