= QAP =

QAP may refer to:

- QAP (Colombia), a Colombian newscast that aired between 1992 and 1997
- Quadratic assignment problem
- Quadratic assignment procedure, a method for evaluating the significance of regression coefficients in regression analysis
- Civic Party of Kazakhstan (Qazaqstan Azamattlyk Partiyasi)
- Queen Anne Press

== See also ==
- Ay Qap, formerly a Kazakh journal of opinion and debate
- Quality assurance program
