= Military divorce =

Special type of divorce process occurring when one or both partners are in the military

Military divorce is a specific type of divorce that arises when one or both partners are members of the military. Although typically an uncontested divorce, military divorces are different because they require additional requirements to be fulfilled. Divorces occur less frequently than within the civilian population. They present a special set of challenges that make military divorces more complicated than a typical divorce. For example, The Federal Service Members Civil Relief Act of 2003 requires any person seeking a divorce to state that their spouse is or is not currently a member of the United States armed forces. This is meant to prevent spouses from seeking divorces from service members who would be unable to attend divorce proceedings.

The Federal Service Members Civil Relief Act of 2003 also allows members of the military additional protections should a non-military spouse seek a divorce of a service member including protecting those service members from being held in default if they fail to respond timely to service of divorce. The Servicemembers' Civil Relief Act also allows service members on active duty to delay divorce proceedings for the duration of active duty and for up to 60 days beyond.

A common challenge presented by military divorce is jurisdiction - where the divorce should be filed if the service member isn't at home. A divorce may be filed at home or where the military member is stationed, both in the United States or abroad.

== Calculating military income ==
Calculating the income of a member of the military requires specific knowledge and expertise, as service members are paid in a number of ways, including basic allowances for housing, expenses, and their basic pay.

== Division of military retirement as an asset upon divorce ==
A servicemember who has served 20 years is entitled to receive a military retirement. Per the Uniformed Services Former Spouses' Protection Act. State courts may but are not required to divide a servicemember's "disposable retired pay" upon dissolution, according to that court's domestic relations laws.

Jurisdiction over a service member is a prerequisite for dividing a military retirement. This jurisdiction is more than simply personal jurisdiction through service of process – it requires either residence within the state not due to military orders, domicile in the state, or the service member's consent.

"Disposable retired pay" is defined as the gross retired pay minus (A) payments back to the United States for prior military retirement overpayments and for recoupments required by law resulting from entitlement to retired pay, (B) court-martial forfeitures, (C) pay waived to receive disability payments from the Veterans Administration (VA), and (D) the Survivor Benefit Plan premium costs for a spouse or former spouse paid pursuant to court order.

"While the Uniformed Services Former Spouses Protection Act does not specify a minimum duration of marriage in order to divide retirement, former spouses who wish to receive their share of the retirement directly from the Defense Finance and Accounting Service must have at least 10 years of marriage overlapping the military service.

If retirement pay is determined to be at least partially a marital asset, DoD Regulation 7000.14-R Para 290601(C) (backed up by 10 USC 1447-1455) requires that division orders specify a dollar amount of award or a percentage of retirement pay with no offsets or set asides. The only way to specify the correct percentage when there have been promotions after the divorce is via the DFAS Hypothetical Method or the Dual Coverture Value (DCV) Method (which is also called the "Area Method" (AM) because of the way it shows on an area diagram). The first involves a sequential process and the second involves a formula based on your circumstance, and handles many more circumstances of life, and correctly handles Reserve military members. All three methods give the same result, and 6 years after they were published, the promotion enhancement set-aside was embodied in Federal law with NDAA 2017 Sec 641. More than 20 attorney guides, whitepapers, and spreadsheet calculation aids are available from 10+ years of research in this area by a PhD analyst.

If a military member is promoted after divorce, the promotion enhancement due to retirement would be a non-marital asset as recommended by a Department of Defense report to Congress about the USFSPA law. Courts have struggled to understand how to implement this. The result is that many times the military member's promotion enhancements, due to sole effort after the divorce, are divided to the ex-spouse. The Area Method is a straightforward method to equitably divide retirement pay in this situation for an Active Duty or Reserve retirement.

For Reserve military officers, a retention benefit program was implemented providing possible early retirement if certain types of duty is done after January 28, 2008. This benefit does not cause the amount of retirement checks to increase, but it can cause an increase to the number of retirement checks to be paid prior to age 60. If a marriage was entirely prior to January 28, 2008, all of the extra checks should equitably belong to the military member, and a division order needs to state this. If a marriage was entirely after January 28, 2008, all of the extra checks should be divided in the same manner as the payments at age 60 and beyond. If a marriage spans that date, the extra checks must be divided with a different percentage. See specific details on a web page about unique Reserve military issues.

== Effect of VA disability payments ==
A Supreme Court decision prohibits states from dividing VA disability payments. However, this does not preclude a state from ordering indemnity payments from a retiree who waives retired pay to receive VA disability after a decree of dissolution has issued. In the State of Michigan, an Appellate court has ruled that any offset or indemnity is in violation of the Federal intent of preserving value for the military member, and hence offsets or indemnities are not allowed. Quoting three paragraphs from the King decision,

"The substantive question in this case is whether the Uniformed Services Former Spouses' Protection Act, 10 USC 1401 et seq., and the supremacy clause of the federal constitution, US Const, art VI, [**564] prevent a state court from treating a military disability pension as a distributable marital asset."

"The court concluded that the trial court was precluded from considering the ex-husband's military disability pension as a marital asset and had improperly awarded the ex-wife one-half the value of the ex-husband's military disability pension. The court agreed with the ex-husband that his military pension could not be considered "directly or indirectly" in the distribution of the marital property."

"[***7] [**565] In McCarty, the Supreme Court clearly held [*500] that a retirement pension could not be distributed as a marital asset. In a footnote, the Court noted that this prohibition is not to be circumvented by an "off-setting award". 453 U.S. 228-229, fn 22. Although McCarty has been overruled by 10 USC 1408, its rationale applies here since 10 USC 1408 does not allow distribution of a disability pension. Thus, we agree with defendant that his military pension may not be considered "directly or indirectly" in the distribution of the marital property. Cf. Kendall v Kendall, 106 Mich App 240, 243-244; 307 NW2d 457 (1981)."

== Tax issues ==
Servicemembers have different rules and regulations with regards to taxes that make child support a more complicated process. Because some military income and deployment benefits are not taxable, a court must decide to levy obligations based on pre-tax income or post-tax income.

== Servicemembers Civil Relief Act ==
The Servicemembers Civil Relief Act protects military servicemembers from being sued while on duty and up to one year following service. This may present a challenge for the plaintiff when suing a member of the military for child support or other financial support.
