= QTT =

QTT may refer to:

- Qitai Radio Telescope, a Chinese radio telescope scheduled for completion in 2023.
- Quantum Trajectory Theory, a formulation of quantum mechanics used for simulating open quantum systems, quantum dissipation and single quantum systems.
