= QNS =

Term used in Medical diagnosis

QNS is a clinical laboratory abbreviation for quantity not sufficient.

This indicates that either:

1. There is not enough specimen for the lab tests ordered to be performed.
2. In the case of Vacutainers or other tubes with pre-added anticoagulant, the amount of blood invacuated into the tube at the time of phlebotomy was insufficient to attain the correct blood:anticoagulant ratio. This can cause false results in assays such as coagulation assays (causing falsely increased clotting times) or blood cell differentials (causing a false increase in poikilocytes, particularly burr cells.)

In either case, the most common and feasible way to correct the problem is to simply recollect the specimen.

Quantity not sufficient implies that the final volume of diluent is not sufficient for molecular testing.
