= QIP =

QIP is a three-letter abbreviation with multiple meanings, as described below:

- Quality Intellectual Property Metric (QIP metric), a standard of Silicon intellectual property cores, developed by Virtual Socket Interface Alliance for Integrated circuit design in the field of Semiconductor
- Quality Improvement Plan, a document outlining methods to improve outcomes, for example in patient care at a hospital.
- Quality Improvement Paradigm, a framework for continuous quality improvement proposed by Victor Basili in 1984
- Quantum information processing
- Quantum Innovation Platform, a method for rapid innovation, research, and problem solving
- QIP (complexity), a complexity class in computational complexity theory
- Quad in-line package, an electronic chip housing standard
- Quiet Internet Pager, a third-party closed-source freeware multiprotocol IM client
- Qualified institutional placement, a method of raising equity by a listed company
- QIP., an Amsterdam based fashion brand specialized in pique menswear
