= Qar =

Qar or QAR may refer to:

== Ancient Egyptians ==
- Qareh (reigned 1770 BC–1760 BC or possibly c. 1710 BC), once misread as Qar, a pharaoh
- Qar (doctor), a doctor during the Sixth Dynasty, which lasted from about 2350 to 2180 BC
- Qar (vizier) (fl. c. 2250 BC), a vizier of the Sixth Dynasty
- Qar (Ancient Egyptian official), an official of the Sixth Dynasty

== Other uses ==
- Qar, Iran, a village in Kurdistan Province
- QAR, Qatari riyal, ISO 4217 currency code
- Quick access recorder, a flight data recorder
