= QM =

QM may refer to:

== Businesses and organizations ==
- QM Productions, a TV production company founded by Quinn Martin
- Air Malawi (IATA airline designator QM)
- Queen Margaret Union, a students' union at the University of Glasgow
- Queen Mary University of London, a public research university
- Queen Mary's Grammar School, a selective boys secondary school in Walsall
- Queen Mary Hospital (Hong Kong), Pokfulam, Hong Kong Island
- Queensland Museum, Australia

== Science, technology, and mathematics ==
=== Computing ===
- OpenQM, referred to as 'QM', a commercial multi-value database system
- Quine-McCluskey algorithm, for minimizing two-level logic

=== Other uses in science, technology, and mathematics ===
- Quadratic mean, in mathematics
- Quantum mechanics, in physics
- Quantitative methods, or quantitative research
- ATCvet code QM Musculo-skeletal system, a section of the Anatomical Therapeutic Chemical Classification System for veterinary medicinal products
- Quettametre or quettameter (Qm), the largest SI unit of length equal to 10^{30} metres, greater than the spherical circumference of the observable universe

== Other uses ==
- Qualified Mortgage, in finance
- Quality management, in business
- Quartermaster, a military or naval role, often related to supply and provisioning
- RMS Queen Mary, a Cunard ocean liner
- Quizmania, an ITV British television quiz game show
