= QDOS =

QDOS may refer to:

- QDOS (Qasar DOS), the Motorola 6800-based operating system of the Fairlight CMI digital sampling synthesizer series, based on the MDOS (Motorola DOS)
- Seattle Computer Products QDOS, SCP's Quick and Dirty Operating System in 1980, later renamed to 86-DOS (predecessor of MS-DOS)
- Sinclair QDOS, the Sinclair QL operating system written in Motorola 68000 assembly language
- Atari QDOS, the production codename of Disk Operating System 4.0 for Atari 8-bit computers
- Qdos Entertainment, the UK-based entertainment company who is the world's largest pantomime producer
- Q:Dos, a recording name for trance musicians Scott Bond, Darren Hodson, John Purser, Nick Rose
- Qdos, range of no-valve metering pumps

== See also ==
- DOS (disambiguation)
- Quality of service (QOS)
