= Qualified domestic relations order =

United States judicial order

A qualified domestic relations order (or QDRO, pronounced "cue-dro" or "qua-dro"), is a judicial order in the United States, entered as part of a property division in a divorce or legal separation that splits a retirement plan or pension plan by recognizing joint marital ownership interests in the plan, specifically the former spouse's interest in that spouse's share of the asset. A QDRO's recognition of spousal ownership interest in a plan participant's (employee's) pension plan awards a portion of the plan participant's benefit to an alternate payee. An alternate payee must be a spouse, former spouse, child or other dependent of the plan participant. A QDRO may also be entered for spousal support or child support.

QDROs apply only to employee benefit or pension plans subject to the Employee Retirement Income Security Act (ERISA), the American federal law governing private sector pensions. Comparable types of orders divide military retirement pay and federal civil service retirement plans, and for State, county and municipal retirement plans in most States. A QDRO may provide for marital or community property division between the plan participant and the alternate payee, or for the payment of alimony or child support to the alternate payee.

QDROs must first be issued by a State-level domestic relations court, and are then reviewed by plan administrators for compliance with the terms of the plan and with ERISA or other applicable law. The QDRO may be a separate document or it may be part of a divorce decree, and is valid as long as it meets the standards for a qualified domestic relations order under ERISA and meets the standards of the plan to which it applies. Courts have jurisdiction to declare a QDRO "qualified" as comporting with federal law, but pension plan administrators must determine whether a QDRO meets the requirements of a specific pension plan.

== Definition ==
A Qualified Domestic Relations Order is a domestic relations order which creates or recognizes the existence of an alternate payee's right to, or assigns to an alternate payee the right to, receive all or a portion of the benefits payable with respect to a participant under a qualified plan (i.e. employer-sponsored). A domestic relations order is qualified by a plan administrator upon the plan administrator's determination that the order meets the plan's rules for segregation. Such orders do not relate to plans not covered by ERISA.

A domestic relations order is any judgment, decree, or order (including approval of a property settlement agreement) which (1) relates to the provision of child support, alimony payments, or marital property rights to a spouse, former spouse, child, or other dependent of a participant, and (2) is made pursuant to a State domestic relations law (including a community property law).

An alternate payee must meet ERISA's definition of an alternate payee - any spouse, former spouse, child or other dependent of a plan participant who is recognized by a domestic relations order as having a right to receive all, or a portion of, the benefits payable under a plan with respect to such participant. Most States will allow QDROs to be entered to collect both past due and future child support payments.

=== Plans not covered by ERISA ===
Examples of retirement plans not covered by ERISA include military retirement pay (covered by the Uniformed Services Former Spouses' Protection Act), State and Municipal retirement plans, Federal Retirement Plans (the Civil Service Retirement System (CSRS), Federal Employees Retirement System (FERS) and Thrift Savings Plan (TSP)), Individual Retirement Accounts (IRAs) (SEP-IRA, SIMPLE IRA and Keogh plan), and most deferred compensation plans. However, a QDRO can be used to divide an IRA because it is a "divorce or separation instrument described in subsection (A) of section 71(b)(2)" under Internal Revenue Code section 408(d)(6).

== Valuation of the distributive award ==
There are several methods of determining of each party's share of the plan benefit. One of the relevant factors is whether or not the participant was already enrolled in the plan prior to the marriage. If plan participation post-dates the date of the marriage, each party's share is (usually) 50% of the participant's benefit value as of the date of the commencement of the divorce action, execution of a stipulation of settlement agreeing to the distribution, separation, or entry of the divorce judgment (whichever date is earliest or agreed upon by the parties to the divorce).

If participation began before the marriage, some states apply the Majauskas (coverture) formula, which divides the length of the marriage in months by the total period of plan participation in months. This ratio determines the alternate payee's proportionate share, reflecting only the time of marriage during which the participant was covered by the plan. The remainder goes to the participant, and the exact division can be adjusted through negotiation or offsets with other marital property.

== Requirements for the Order ==
The court order for a QDRO must comply with three general sets of rules, namely, (1) the requirements of the plan itself, (2A) the requirements of ERISA, which are essentially parallel to (2B) the requirements of the U.S. tax code, and (3) the domestic relations law of the applicable state:

- Comportment with and citation to the applicable State domestic relations law. Applicable State law and its standards is specific to each state, for example, with respect to New York's Domestic Relations Law § 236, the distribution must be "equitable" (fair).
- U.S. tax code. Preservation of any tax deferred status of the plan benefit is the responsibility of the movant.
- The Internal Revenue Code contains requirements that are essentially parallel to those in ERISA, e.g., the method of distribution must be selected from among the options available to the plan participant, according to the terms of the plan, and the order may not require the plan to distribute a participant's benefit in a manner inconsistent with the plan's terms.

All QDROs must contain certain information:

- The formal name of the plan,
- The full name and last known mailing address of the participant, employee or contributor (variously referred to as the "Plan Participant", "Payee", or "Distributee"), and the "Alternate Payee" (spouse, former spouse, or other payee),
- Social Security Numbers of both parties, (which for privacy purposes are often provided to the plan administrator under separate cover),
- Participant's plan identification number if different from the participant's Social Security number,
- The amount or portion of the plan benefit payable to the alternate payee and the method to be used to calculate such amount, and
- For a defined benefit plan, the duration for which the benefit is payable to the alternate payee.
