= Freehub =

Type of bicycle hub

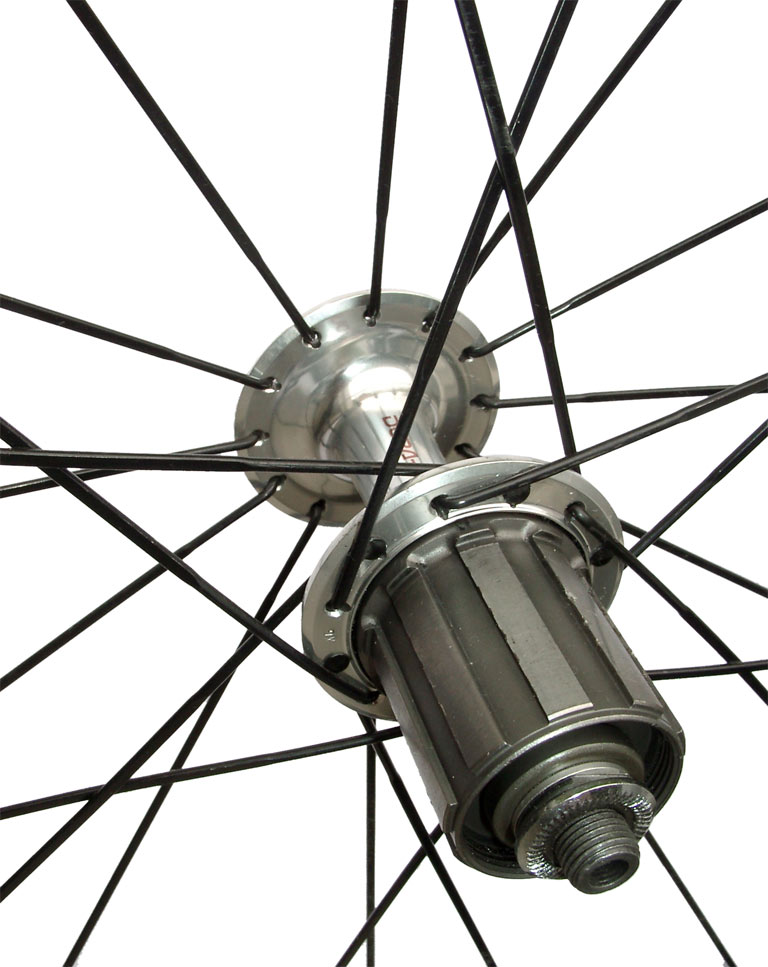
A Shimano Hyperglide (HG) freehub

A freehub is a type of bicycle hub that incorporates a ratcheting mechanism.

A set of sprockets (called a "cassette") is mounted onto a splined shaft of the freehub to engage the chain. The ratcheting mechanism is a part of the hub, in contrast to a freewheel, an older technology, which contains both the sprockets and a ratcheting mechanism in a single unit separate from the hub. In many high-end and midrange bicycles, freehubs have replaced freewheel systems.

Both freehub and freewheel mechanisms allow a rider to stop pedalling whilst the cycle is still in forward motion. On a cycle without a such a mechanism, the rider has to keep pedalling whenever the cycle is moving.

== Comparison to freewheels ==
Freehub vs freewheel hub

The freehub concept answers several drawbacks encountered with the freewheel design:

- Freewheels are threaded onto an axle hub, using conventional right-hand threads. As the bicycle rider pedals, the freewheel is continuously kept tight, as chain torque is in the right-hand direction. This becomes a problem when the freewheel needs to be removed. Having undergone high torque from leg muscles, it is difficult to loosen and remove the freewheels. A freehub, on the other hand, has cogs that slide onto an axially-splined cylindrical outer shell. A lockring or the last cog(s) are threaded onto the freehub. It is fastened to the wheel hub itself with a hollow retaining screw (for example, using a hex key on some models) through which the axle is inserted during operation.
- The chain gear sprockets wear faster than the ratcheting mechanism. Replacing individual sprockets on a freehub cassette is easy compared to that on some freewheels.
- The ball bearings for the wheel's axle are in the hub, but a multi-speed freewheel requires a considerable distance between the drive-side bearings and the drive-side frame dropout. This distance acts as a leverage force on the axle. Since the freehub can have its bearings near the end of the cassette (and the dropout), axle bending and breaks are far less common. Not all manufactures/models use this design. Those designs often use an axle made from oversize aluminum to compensate for the additional bending moment on the axle.

Beyond removal from the hub and of the cassette, there is limited, if any, access for cleaning and lubrication. The part can be fabricated relatively inexpensively and is not intended to be serviced or disassembled with hand tools. The latter is only possible by means of specialized or shop equipment. The outer cup covering the ratchet pawls and bearings is pressed into place at the factory, secured by interference fit, leveraging the same inner threads of the shell into which the cassette lockring normally screws.

== History ==
The concept of a freehub was devised and manufactured by British company Bayliss-Wiley in 1938 and won the Cyclists Touring Club (CTC) award for that year. On the Bayliss-Wiley design the freewheel unit was threaded to accept the sprockets. A different 4-speed design was manufactured by BSA Cycles Ltd in 1949 to accompany their BSA 4 Star derailleur gear. The BSA design had a splined freewheel unit (BSA part No.8-1913) which attached to the hub shell (BSA part No.8-701) and carried four sprockets.

Shimano made their first freehub in 1978 in both the Dura-Ace, and 600 (later known as Ultegra) models. It was a significant improvement. It proved to be the first widely used commercially successful freehub.

Freehubs, manufactured by various companies, are now common on mid- to high-end bicycles today. Nevertheless, freewheels continue to be fitted on some new bikes, especially single speed, and cheaper models of derailleur bicycles.

== Types of freehub body fitments ==
- Shimano Hyperglide (HG): Fits 7, 8, 9 and 10-speed cassette with down to 11-teeth (11T) sprockets, and is a very common freehub.
- Shimano Hyperglide 11 (HG-11): Fits 11 speed and 12 speed cassettes with down to 11T sprocket, and is wider than the original Hyperglide.
- Shimano Microspline: Fits 12 speed Shimano mountain bike (XTR M9100, Deore XT M8100, SLX M7100 and Deore M6100) cassettes with 10T sprocket.
- SRAM XD and XDR: Fits 11-speed and 12-speed SRAM mountain bike (Eagle Transmission, Eagle (NX and SX excluded), XX1, X01, GX and X01 DH) and road bike (RED Etap AXS, Force Etap AXS, Rival Etap AXS and XPLR (Apex excluded)) cassettes with 10T sprocket and E*Thirteen mountain and road bike (Helix and TRS) cassettes with 9T sprocket.
- Campagnolo: Fits all Campagnolo 9-12 speed cassettes, but not Campagnolo EKAR 13 speed.
- Campagnolo N3W: Fits Campagnolo EKAR 13 speed cassette and older 9-12 speed Campagnolo cassette.
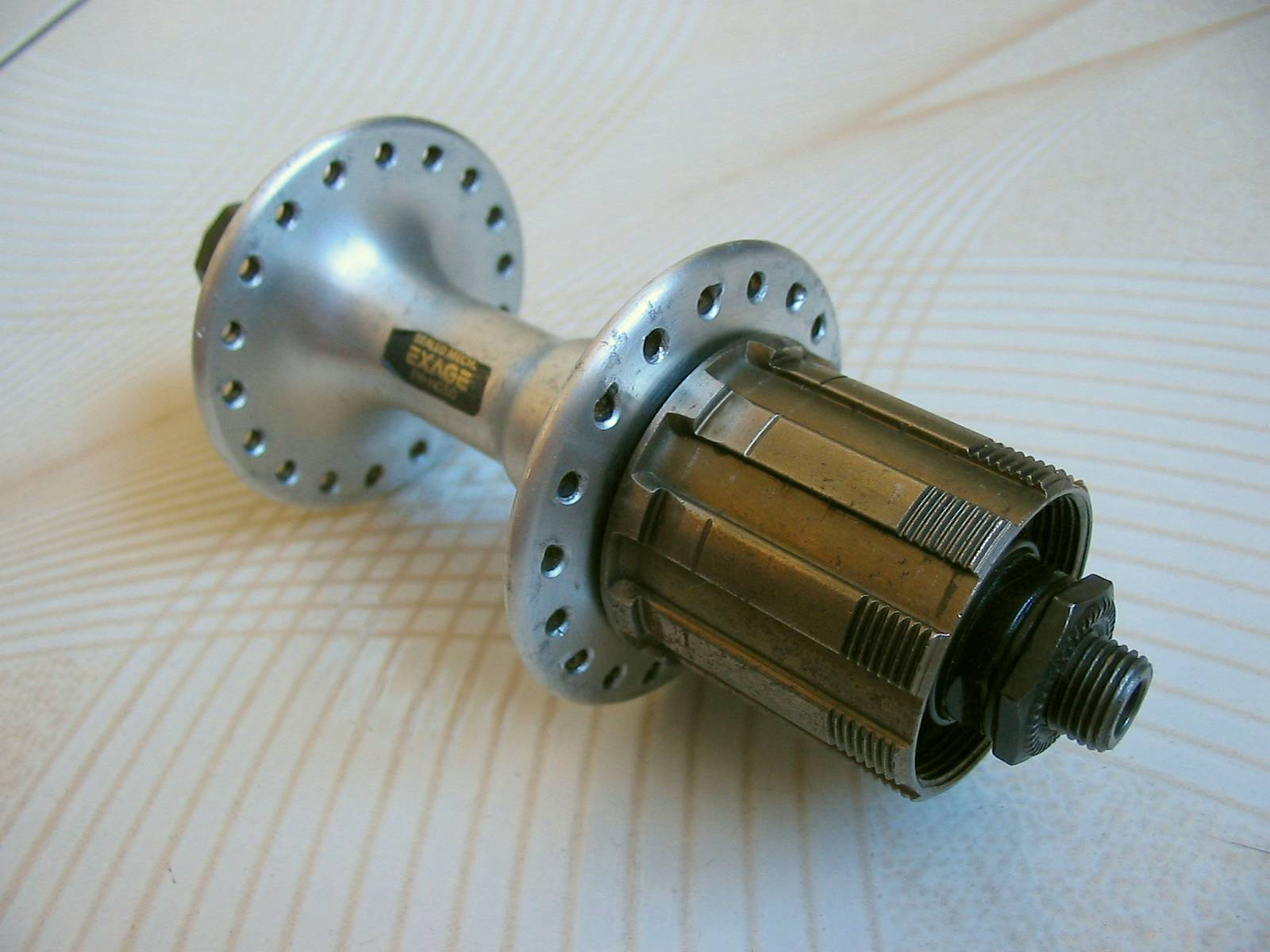
Shimano Hyperglide splines

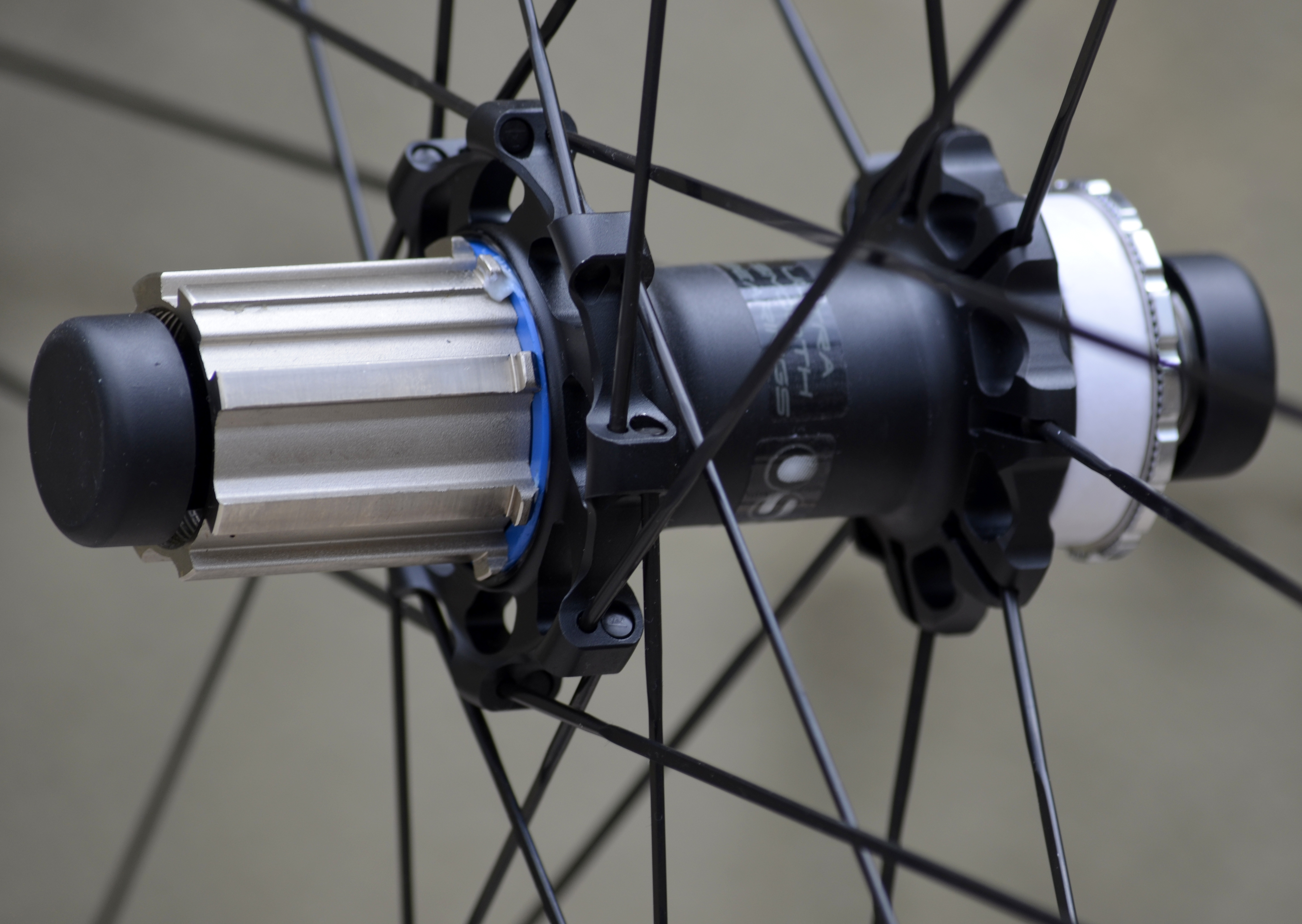
Campagnolo splines

== See also ==
- Front freewheel
- Cogset
