= Cogset =

Set of sprockets attached to the rear wheel hub of a bicycle

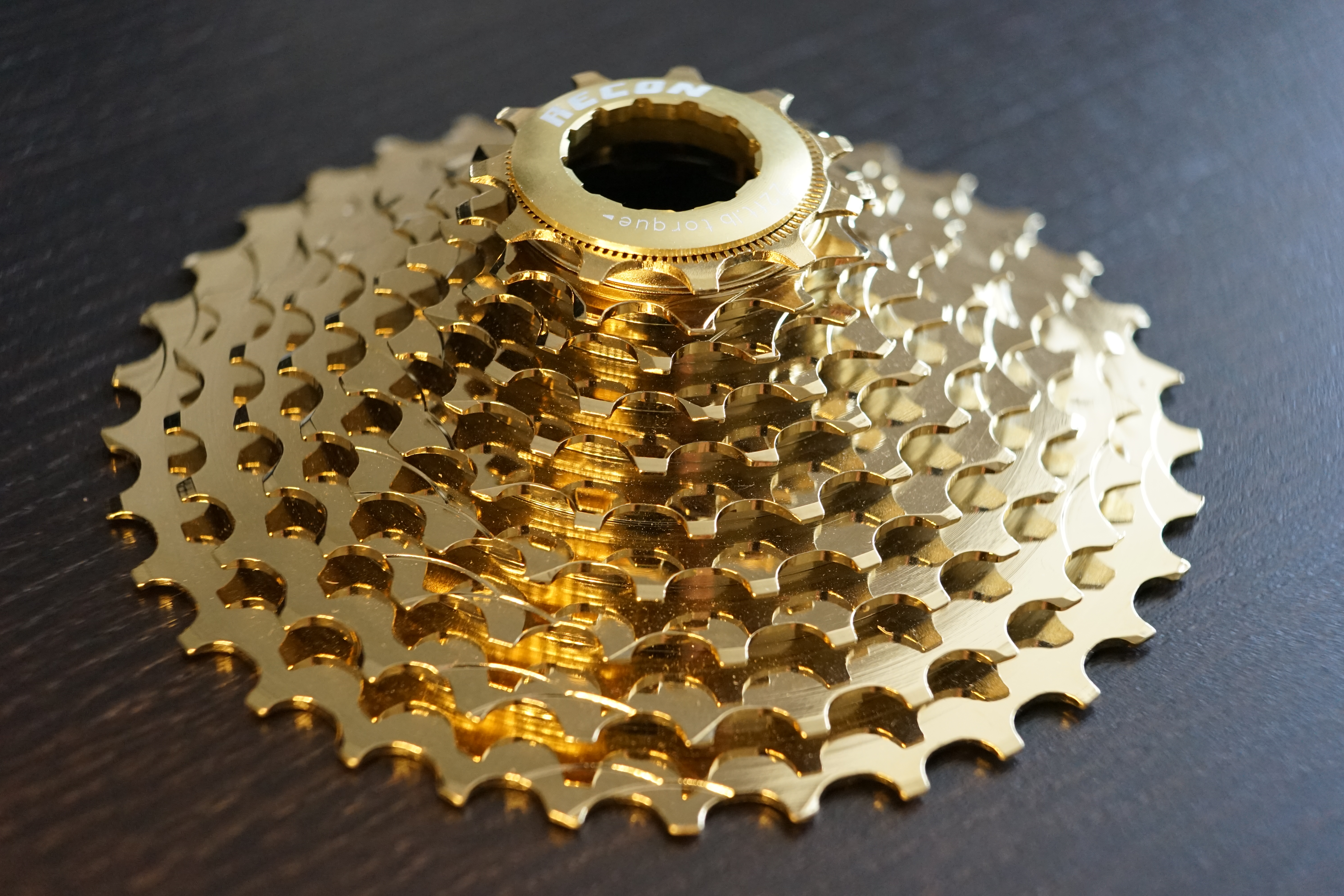
10-speed bicycle cassette

On a bicycle, the cogset or cluster is the set of multiple sprockets that attaches to the hub on the rear wheel. A cogset works with a rear derailleur to provide multiple gear ratios to the rider. Cassettes come in two varieties, freewheels or cassettes, of which cassettes are a newer development. Although cassettes and freewheels perform the same function and look almost the same when installed, they have important mechanical differences and are not interchangeable.

== Freewheels ==
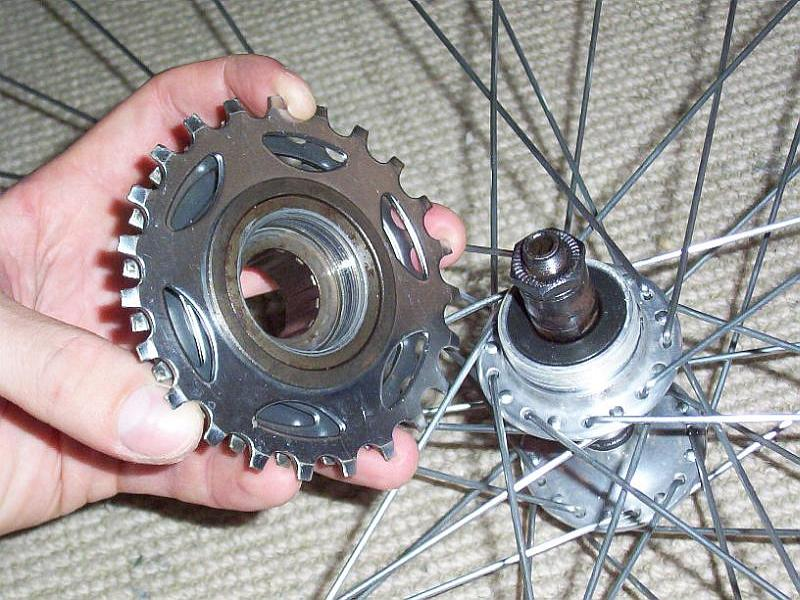
A freewheel and freewheel hub

A freehub (above) for use with a cassette and a threaded hub (below) for use with a freewheel

A freewheel (also known as a block) consists of either a single sprocket or a set of sprockets mounted on a body which contains an internal ratcheting mechanism and mounts on a threaded hub. Threaded rear hubs were available in different thread patterns depending on the country of manufacture, French and British threads being the most common. The British Cycle Engineers Institute (CEI) thread was adopted as the international standard and is now known as British Standard Cycle (BSC). It is a standardized right-hand 1-3/8″-24 TPI (M34.925×1.058 mm) thread onto which a standard freewheel is screwed. This allows different brands of freewheels to be mounted on different brands of hubs.

The major disadvantage of the multiple sprocket freewheel design is that the drive-side bearing is located inboard of the freewheel, and as sprockets were added over time, the bearing moved inward, farther from the drive-side axle support. This resulted in more flexing stress being placed on the axle, which can bend or even break. Multiple speed freewheels were common on quality high end bicycles until the late 1980s. Suntour — Maeda Industries (Japan) introduced a compact 6 speed freewheel which reduced the spacing between the sprockets and was the same width as a standard 5 speed freewheel but required a narrower chain than the standard. The concept was copied by European freewheel manufacturers Regina (Italy) and Maillard (France). As the number of sprockets on a multiple freewheel increased, and became physically wider, the freehub design overcame the axle/bearing problem associated with threaded hubs and began to supersede the freewheel design. Today it is rare to find a freewheel on a new bicycle with more than 7 speeds. Some new single-speed — especially BMX and utility bicycles — and lower-end multi-geared bicycles continue to be manufactured and sold with freewheels.

Pedaling forces tighten a freewheel onto the hub, so no tool is required to install one. The ratcheting mechanism prevents the freewheel being loosened when the sprockets are turned counter-clockwise. A freewheel can be removed from the hub with one of the many specific freewheel removal tools that engages a spline or set of notches on the outboard end of the freewheel. Removal often requires considerable effort due to the large torque that tightens the freewheel during pedaling, and some freewheels cannot be removed intact. Future removal of a freewheel is facilitated by grease on the freewheel threads before installation.

== Cassettes ==
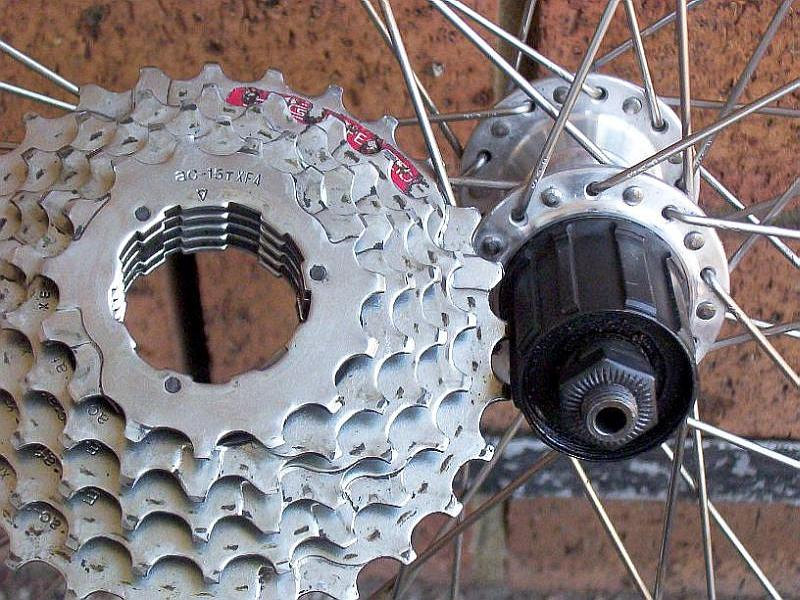
Shimano cassette and freehub

Cassettes are distinguished from freewheels in that a cassette has a series of straight splines that form the mechanical connection between the sprockets and the cassette compatible hub, called a freehub, which contains the ratcheting mechanism. The entire cassette is held on the hub by means of a threaded lockring. Some cassette systems from the late 1980s and early 1990s use a threaded small sprocket to hold on the larger splined sprockets. Cassettes resemble freewheels when installed, but are clearly different when removed as they do not contain a freewheel's internal ratcheting mechanism.

The sprockets in a cassette are usually held together by three small bolts or rivets for ease of installation. These keep the sprockets and spacers in the correct order and position when they are removed from the freehub body. When the sprockets need to be replaced due to wear or the user wishes to change gear ratios available, only the sprockets are replaced, not the ratchet mechanism. Cassettes also allow the use of sprockets with fewer teeth, as in micro drive systems.

The ratchet mechanism, known as the freehub body, is still replaceable on most hubs, but forms a structural part of the hub. Cassette systems have a major advantage in that the drive-side axle bearing can be out near the frame, rather than being back towards the centre of the axle behind the freewheel. This greatly reduces the stress on the rear axle, making bent or broken axles extremely rare.

Since their introduction in the late 1970s cassettes have been used on increasing numbers of bicycles, starting at the high-end and over time becoming available on less expensive bicycles. By 2010, the vast majority of bicycles with derailleur gears transitioned to this newer design.

== Number and width of sprockets ==
Over time, the number of sprockets in a cogset has increased, from 3 or 4 before World War II, to 5 used from the 1950s to the 1970s, up to the 8, 9, 10, 11, 12, and even 13 in the 2010s found on modern bicycles. As more rear sprockets were added, the combination became wider, and the sprocket spacing narrower. One of the ways to make space for this was the axle length (measured as the over locknut distance — OLD.) was increased, necessitating more dish on the rear wheel drive side with a threaded hub to centre the wheel in the frame. The hub flanges spacing was not shortened on threaded hubs, rather the axle length increased from 120 mm OLD (5-speed/compact-6) to 126 mm OLD (6-speed/compact-7) through to 130 mm OLD (threaded 7-speed) for a road bicycle. MTB rear spacing is normally 135 mm OLD. Another advantage of the Shimano cassette hubs introduced from 1978 was that the rear hub flanges were wider apart than those of a threaded hub, so built a stronger wheel with less dish and without the problem of increased bearing stress or axle failure.

Before the introduction of indexed shifting, the width of a 5-speed or compact-6 freewheel was approximately 32 mm; the introduction of indexed shifting supposedly made standardized sprocket spacing necessary. Shimano and Campagnolo both came up with independent standards, and SRAM later followed Shimano's lead in respect to sprocket spacing and cassette width. The width of early Shimano 6- and 7-speed cassettes was 36 mm, and early 8-speed 40 mm wide. Shimano then changed again and standardised 8-11 speed cassettes on 41.5 mm and second generation 7-speed to 38 mm. The widening of the sprocket carrier on the cassette hubs to 41.5 mm resulted in a decrease in the distance between the hub flanges.

For Shimano and SRAM the cassette spacing developed as follows. Early Shimano 7-speed cassettes are 36 mm wide, with sprocket spacing of 3.65 mm, but levers and rear derailleurs are not compatible with later Shimano 7-speed cassettes, which are 38 mm wide and have 3.2 mm sprocket spacing. An 8-speed cassette is wider at 41.5 mm than a second generation Shimano 7. This results in functionally compatible shifters, but specific freehub bodies, or necessitating the use of a spacer with a 7-speed cassette on an 8-speed hub. 8- and 9-speed cassettes and freehub bodies have the same width (41.5 mm), yet the sprockets on the 9-speed are closer together; as a result the shifters are not compatible, but they use the same freehub bodies. This development continued with 10-speed cassettes, but branched out for 11-speed cassettes. With them, new freehub bodies emerged which were either wider (Shimano road 11-speed) or entirely different (SRAM XD, XDr, which differ in width and both provide the space for a 10-tooth cog). For 12-speed, Shimano introduced a new freehub body as well (Microspline).

This progression has provided more fine adjustment of gear ratio, however the use of thinner metal parts has had the effect of shortening the life-span of the chain and sprockets due to so called "stretching" of the chain. This is caused by frictional abrasion of the load-bearing surfaces of the chain causing elongation. As such, the chain and sprockets of a 9-speed system require more frequent replacement than an 8-speed system. The narrowing of the hub flanges has created more dish in the wheel, which weakens the wheel if all other factors are the same, but improvements in the strength and reliability of spokes and rims has more than balanced this out, and wheel strength is generally higher despite the increased dish.

== See also ==
- Bicycle gearing
- Cycling
- Cycling terminology
- Front freewheel or freewheel crank, a freewheel mechanism in the bottom bracket
- Hub gear
- Mountain biking
- Sprocket
