= Hyperglide =

Cycling component brand name

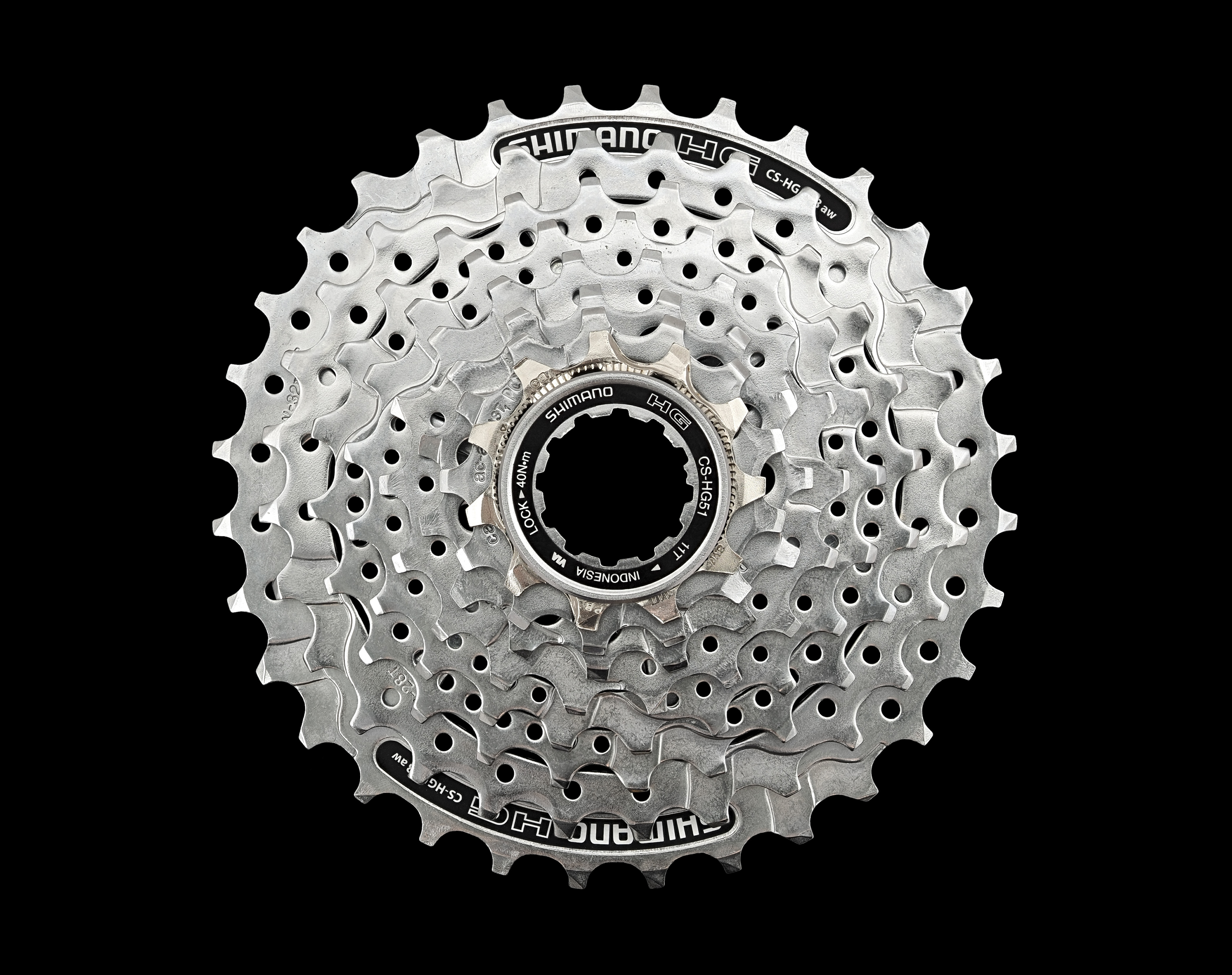
Shimano 8-speed cassette showing the Hyperglide teeth profiles

Hyperglide is the name given by cycling component manufacturer Shimano to a sprocket design in their bicycle derailleur tooth cassette systems. It varies gear tooth profiles, and/or pins along the faces of freewheel or cassette sprockets, or between the chainrings in a crankset, to ease shifting between them.

== Development ==
The design, developed by Shimano, improves on their earlier Uniglide design (which used beveled/twisted gear teeth instead of ramps), and was introduced as part of a commercially viable index shifting system. The Hyperglide ramps, along with laterally floating derailleur jockey wheels, allows for enough "slop" in the system to make indexed shifting reliable, despite variations in shift cable adjustment and manufacturing or assembly tolerances. A Hyperglide freewheel or cassette on a bike with friction shifters can further improve shifting.

== Design ==
The individual sprockets on a Hyperglide cassette or freewheel are designed specifically to work with their neighbours. For example, the 18-tooth sprocket on a wide-range cassette (such as one for a mountain bike) will have a different ramp pattern than the 18-tooth sprocket on a narrow-range cassette, because the number of teeth on the neighbouring sprocket requires a different ramp pattern for an optimal shift. As a result, cassettes are sold as a cohesive unit—rather than as individual sprockets—with all the sprockets on a given cassette designed to work with each other. However, some mixing and matching is possible for a custom gear range, as long as all the sprockets' ramps are compatible.

In order to ensure alignment of each sprocket with its neighbour, the freehub has a narrow spline at one position, and each sprocket has a corresponding wide tooth on its inside face.

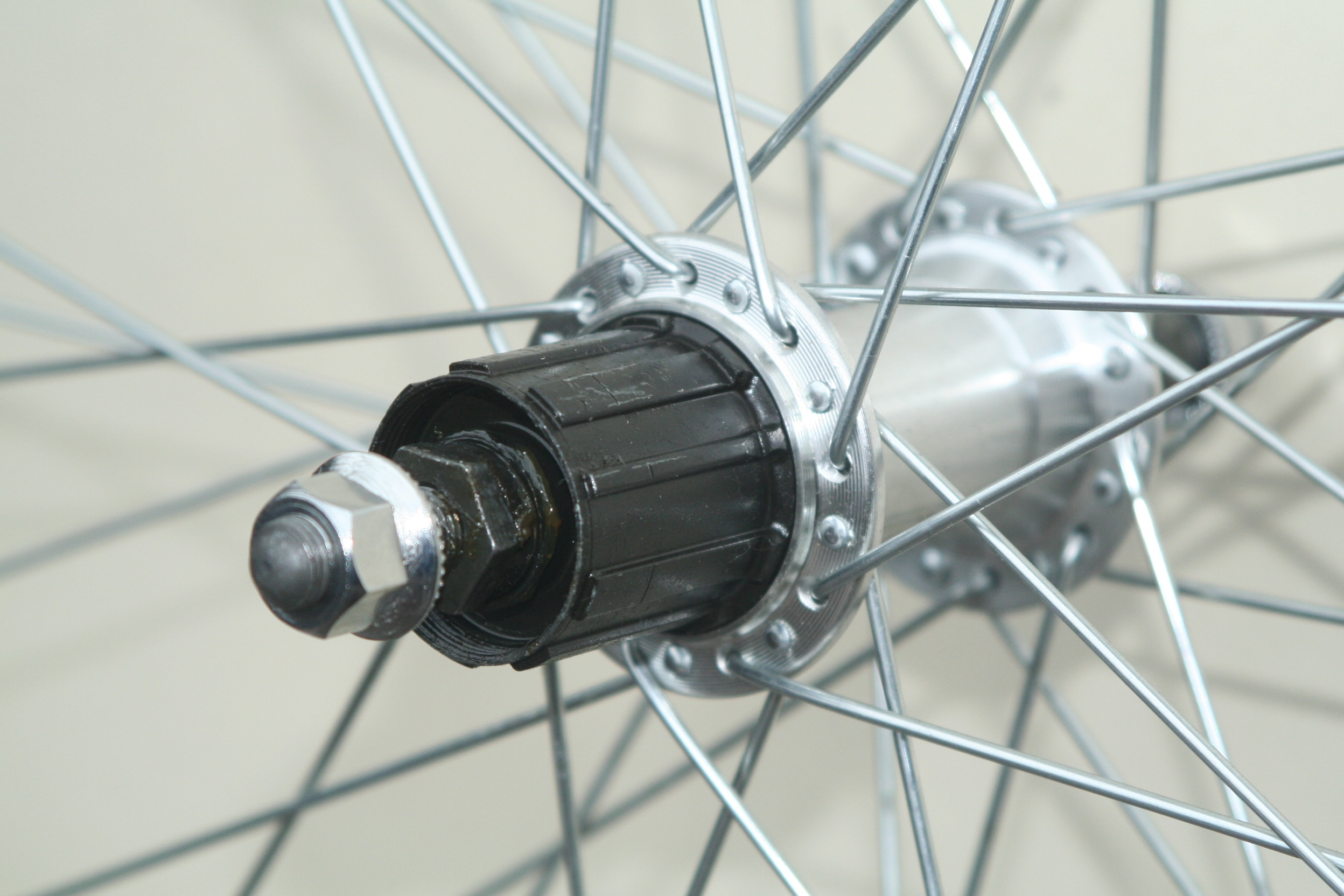
Alignment spline on freehub

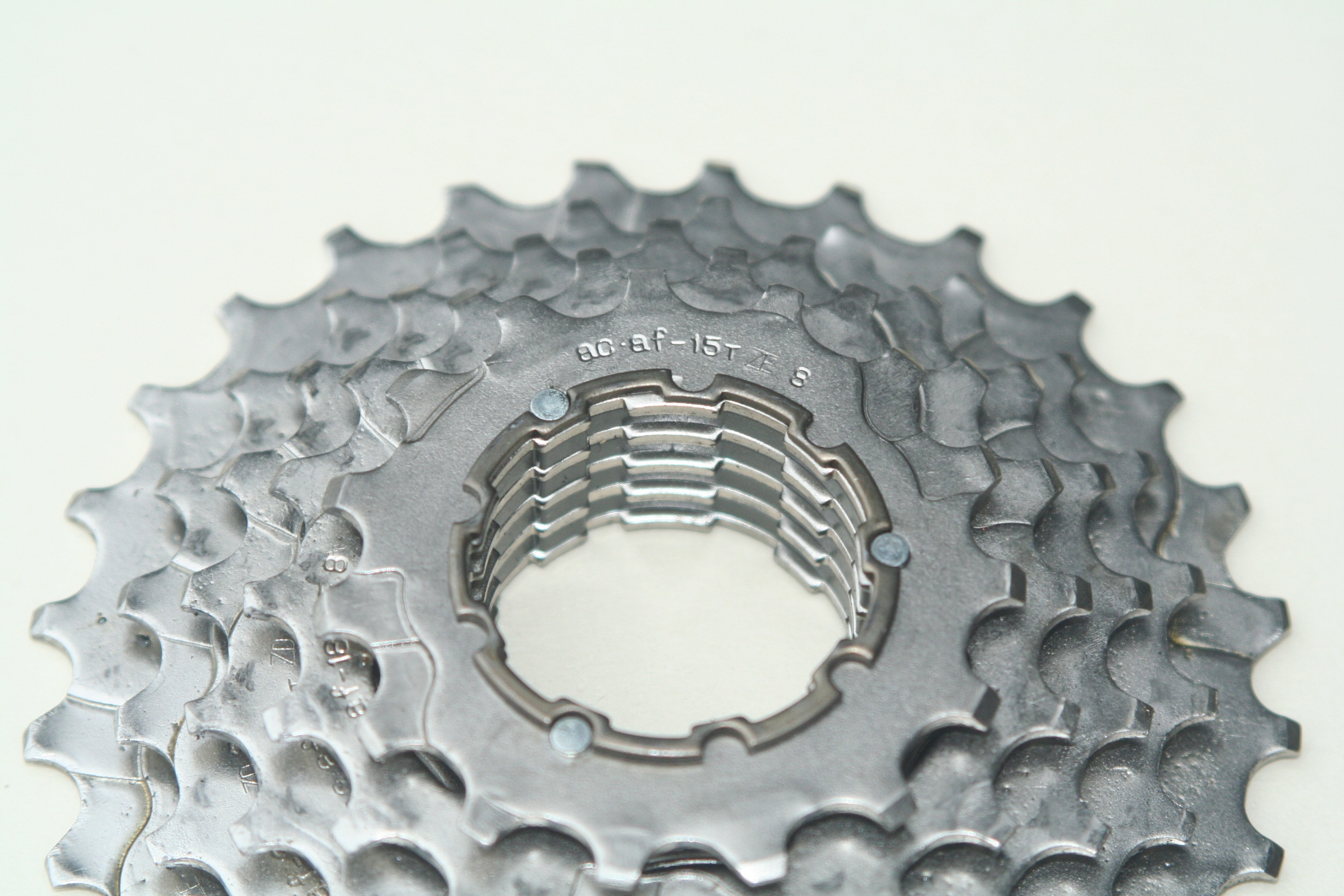
Matching tooth on cassette

== Interactive glide ==
The interactive glide gear system is an extension of hyperglide, in which both sides of the bicycle gear sprockets are physically contoured to improve upshifting. Interactive glide sprockets are slightly thicker than hyperglide variants, and due to this difference, some Shimano Hyperglide chains may hang up if used on an interactive glide cassette. The slightly wider interactive glide chains work on either type, as do SRAM chains. The IG chains are wider internally but narrower externally than the standard HG chains that Shimano made at the same time; the plates of the chains are thinner.
