= Shimano Pedaling Dynamics =

Clipless bicycle pedals and cleats

Shimano Pedaling Dynamics, commonly called SPD, is a design of clipless bicycle pedals and associated cleats first released by Shimano in 1990. Designed primarily for mountain biking, SPD uses a recessed two-bolt cleat that allows riders to walk more easily than with road-cycling oriented clipless systems. The system became one of the most widely adopted clipless pedal standards for mountain biking, commuting, touring, cyclocross, and gravel cycling. Shimano also produces a road cycling system known as SPD-SL, which uses a three-bolt cleat and is not compatible with SPD.

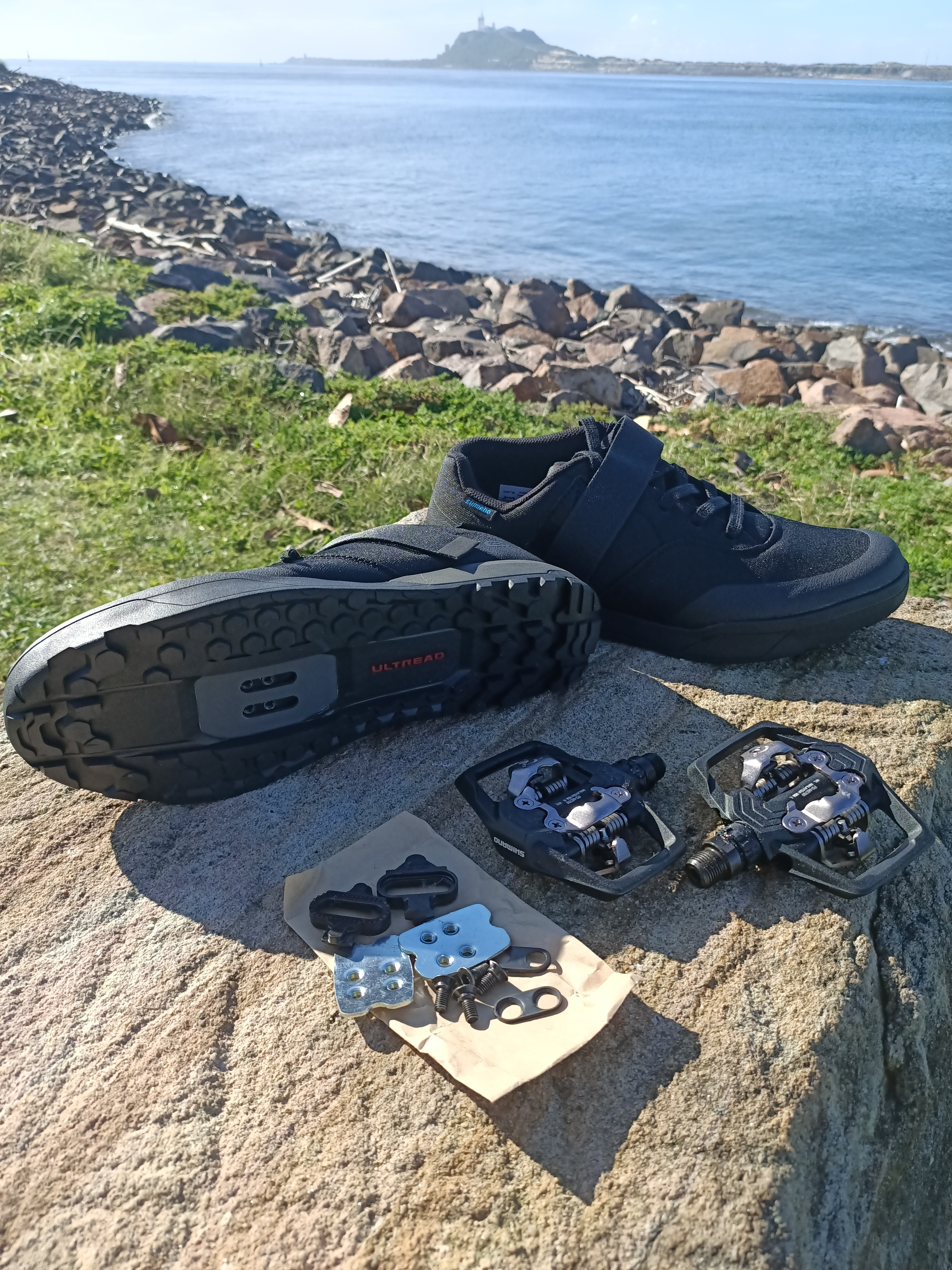
Shimano SPD system components: ME700 pedals, SM-SH51 cleats, and SPD-compatible cycling shoes.

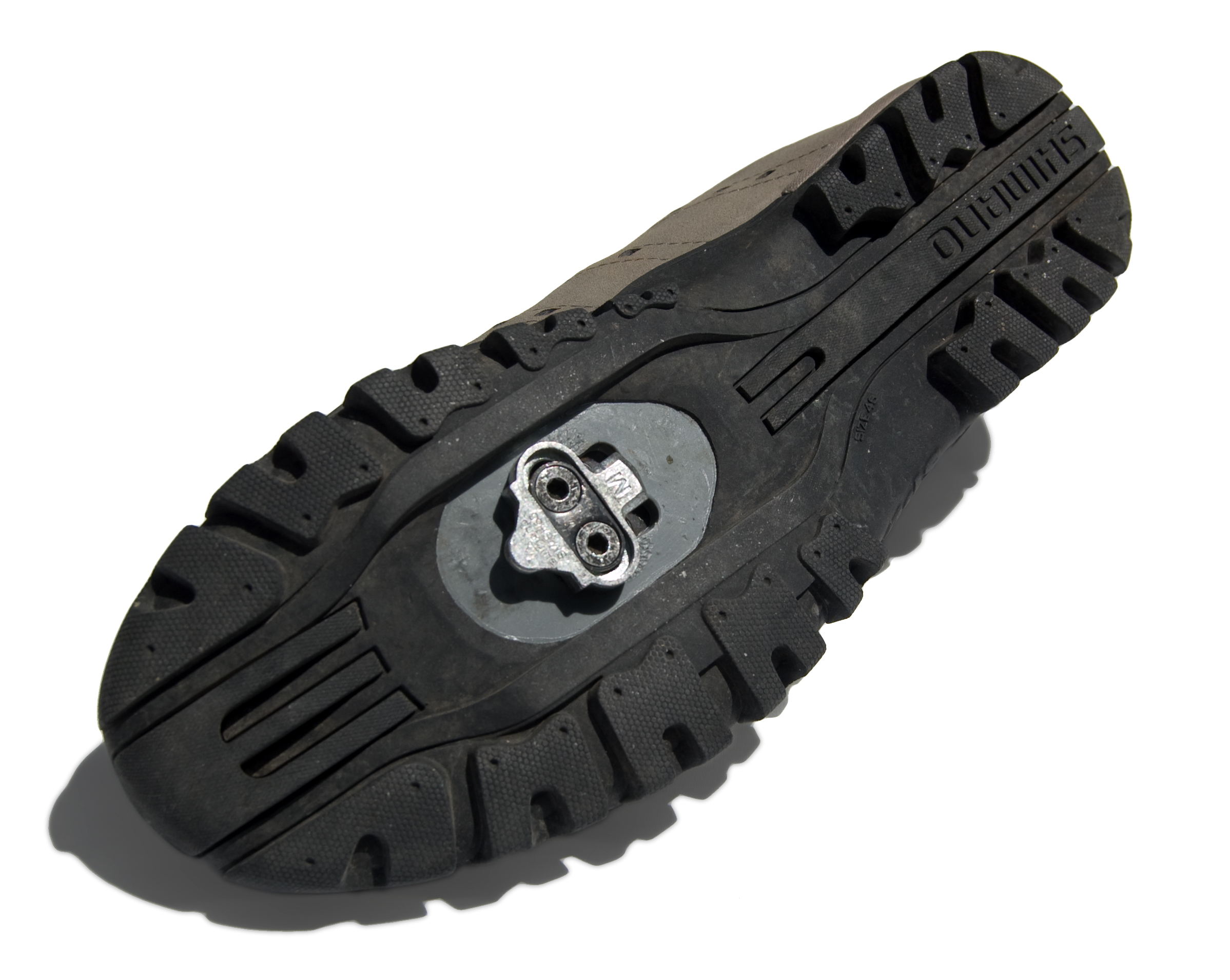
Shimano MT31 shoe with SH56 cleat

== History ==
Prior to the popularization of SPD, mountain bikers in the 1980s typically used toe clips and straps or "road" clipless pedals. These early systems often became clogged with mud, making engagement and release difficult in off-road conditions, while also making walking very difficult when riders were forced to dismount. In 1990, Shimano introduced the PD-M737 pedal along with the M100 shoe to address these shortcomings.The system was aimed at mountain biking enthusiasts and featured improved mud-shedding performance compared with earlier clipless designs.

Rotation of shoe with SM-SH51 SPD cleat, showing cleat recessed within outsole groove and walking surface clearance.

Its steel cleat was recessed into the tread of the shoe, allowing the shoe to be used easily for walking. SPD gained popularity among mountain bikers, helped establish the two-bolt mountain-bike cleat standard used throughout the cycling industry, and later expanded into touring, commuting, and gravel cycling applications.

== Design ==
Shimano makes a number of different SPD-type cleats, and not all cleats are compatible with all pedals, mainly between the recessed metal "mountain" (SPD) [2-Bolt] line and the protruding plastic "road" (SPD-SL) [3-Bolt] (a.k.a. "LOOK") line.

As for SPD cleats, there is an important distinction between SPD black "single release" cleats (SM-SH51) and silver "multi release" cleats (SM-SH56). The former can only be released from the pedal by twisting the heel directly sideward through an outward heel rotation, while the latter permits release through a wider range of foot movements, including a certain upward and also diagonal motions, and are therefore easier to learn/use for novices to clipless pedals. The SM-SH56 (multi-release) cleats is however more prone to unintentional unclipping compared with SM-SH51 (single-release) cleats. Both cleats are compatible with most standard SPD pedals.

SPD cleats typically allows a limited degree of angular movement, known as a "float", which is in reference to the amount a rider's foot can rotate while clipped into the pedal before the cleat releases. The amount of float is determined by the specific SPD cleat and pedal design. A small amount of float may accommodate natural variations in foot positioning and reduce stress on the knees.

And as for SPD-SL (SuperLight) cleats, they operate closer to the "single release" SPD cleats, in that they release with more sideward force. The SPD-SL cleats are offered in three different 'float' options: Yellow - 6 degrees [like SPD] (SM-SH11), Blue - 2 degrees (SM-SH12), Red - 0 degrees [fixed] (SM-SH10). Yellow, one of the original offerings, is the most popular option. Blue, the newest, offers a middle ground in float. SPD-SL pedals offer a larger contact area than SPD for long road rides, at the expense of ease of walking.

Both SPD and SPD-SL have a small adjustment screw (per side on dual-side SPD) on the pedal that can be used to alter the resistance required to release the cleat from the pedal, so beginners can have it 'soft' and easy to get out, and then tighten it up as they progress.
