= Bicycle pedal =

Bicycle part which the rider pushes with their foot to turn the wheels

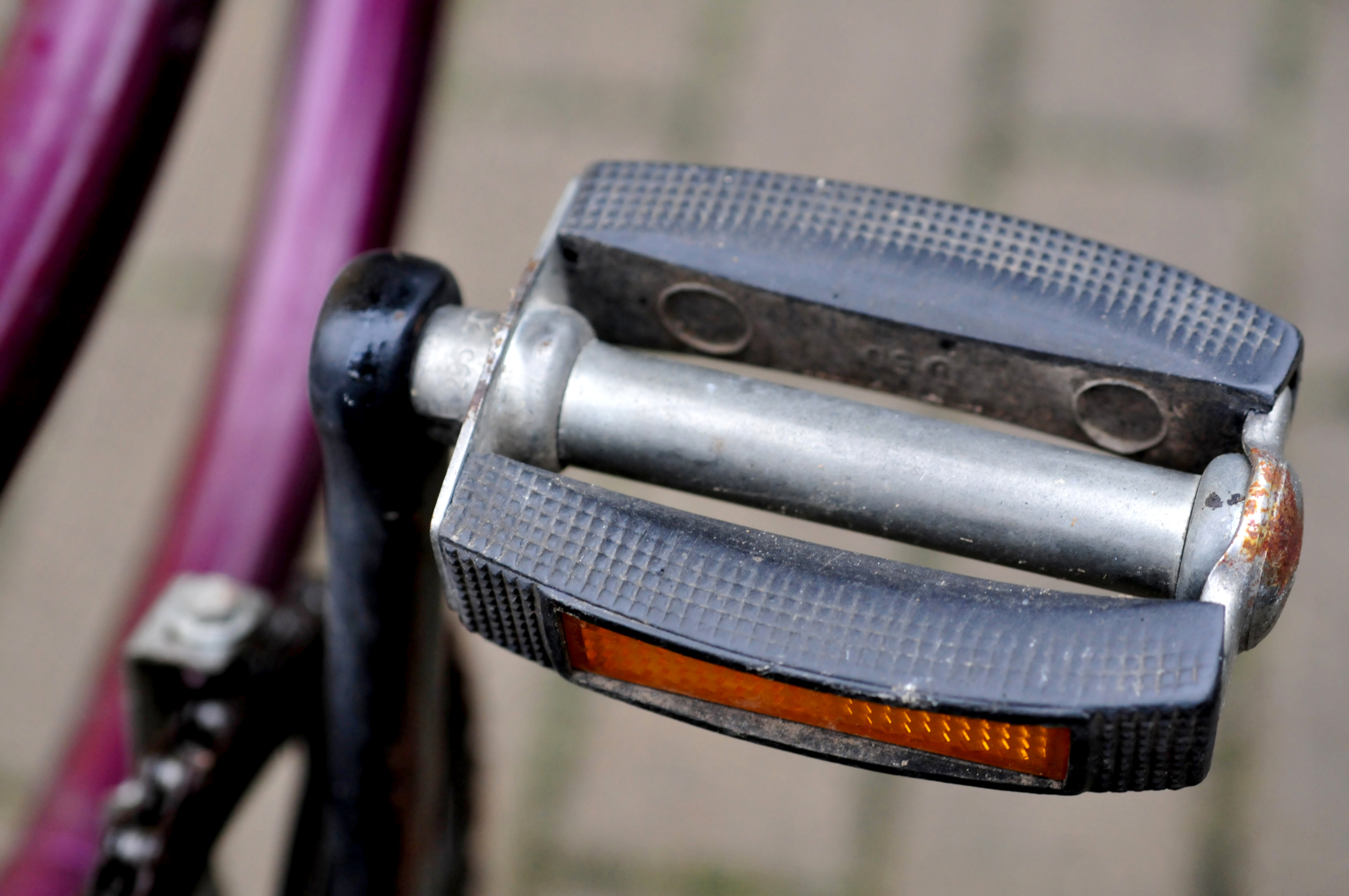
Simple platform bicycle pedal

The pedal is the part of a bicycle that the rider pushes with their foot to propel the vehicle. It provides the connection between the cyclist's foot or shoe and the crank allowing the leg to turn the bottom bracket spindle and propel the bicycle's wheels. A pedal usually consists of a spindle that threads into the end of the crank, and a body on which the foot rest is attached, that is free to rotate on bearings with respect to the spindle.

Pedals were initially attached to cranks connecting directly to the driven (usually front) wheel. The safety bicycle, as it is known today, came into being when the pedals were attached to a crank driving a sprocket that transmitted power to the driven wheel by means of a roller chain.

== Types ==
Just as bicycles come in many varieties, there are different types of pedals to support different types of cycling.

=== Flat and platform ===
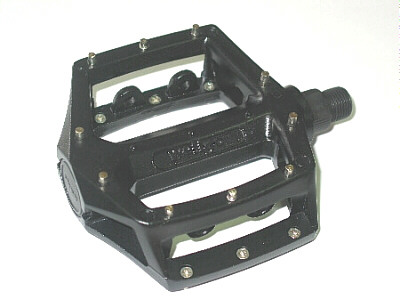
Wellgo DMR V8 Copy pedal

Traditionally, platform pedals were pedals with a relatively large flat area for the foot to rest on, in contrast to the quill pedal which had very little surface area.

One form of the platform pedal had a large flat top area and flat bottom for use with toe clips and toe straps. They were designed for greater comfort when using shoes with less than rigid soles. They typically had a smaller cutaway underside giving greater cornering clearance, which was often needed for track cycling. They were often marketed as being more aerodynamic than conventional quill pedals.

Attaching the shoes to the pedals gives the user more control over the pedal movements. There are two methods for attaching a cyclist's shoes to their pedals: toe clips – a basket-and-strap device which holds the foot in place – and so-called clipless pedals, where specialized shoes with built-in bindings attach to compatible pedals.

In mountain biking (MTB) and BMX, platform pedals typically refer to any flat pedal without a cage. BMX riders typically use plastic pedals made of nylon, polycarbonate, or carbon reinforced plastic, although aluminum alloy and magnesium are not uncommon pedal body materials. Mountain bikers tend to use aluminum or magnesium because of the necessary use of metal studs to offer grip while the pedals are wet, muddy and slippery. BMXers tend to prefer platforms to cage pedals because they offer more support and grip for flexible "skate" shoes by using short metal studs. Cage pedals are more popular in the low end mountain bike range. In general, cage pedals are uncommon in all types of biking, although there is a niche market within mountain biking.

Platform pedals are available in a wide variety of types and prices, ranging from disposable plastic units used for test rides on new bicycles to high-end downhill models. Budget models may be made of steel or aluminum and incorporate reflectors for safer riding on streets at night, in addition to complying with some traffic laws. Less expensive platform pedals are generally considered disposable and cannot be rebuilt when worn out.

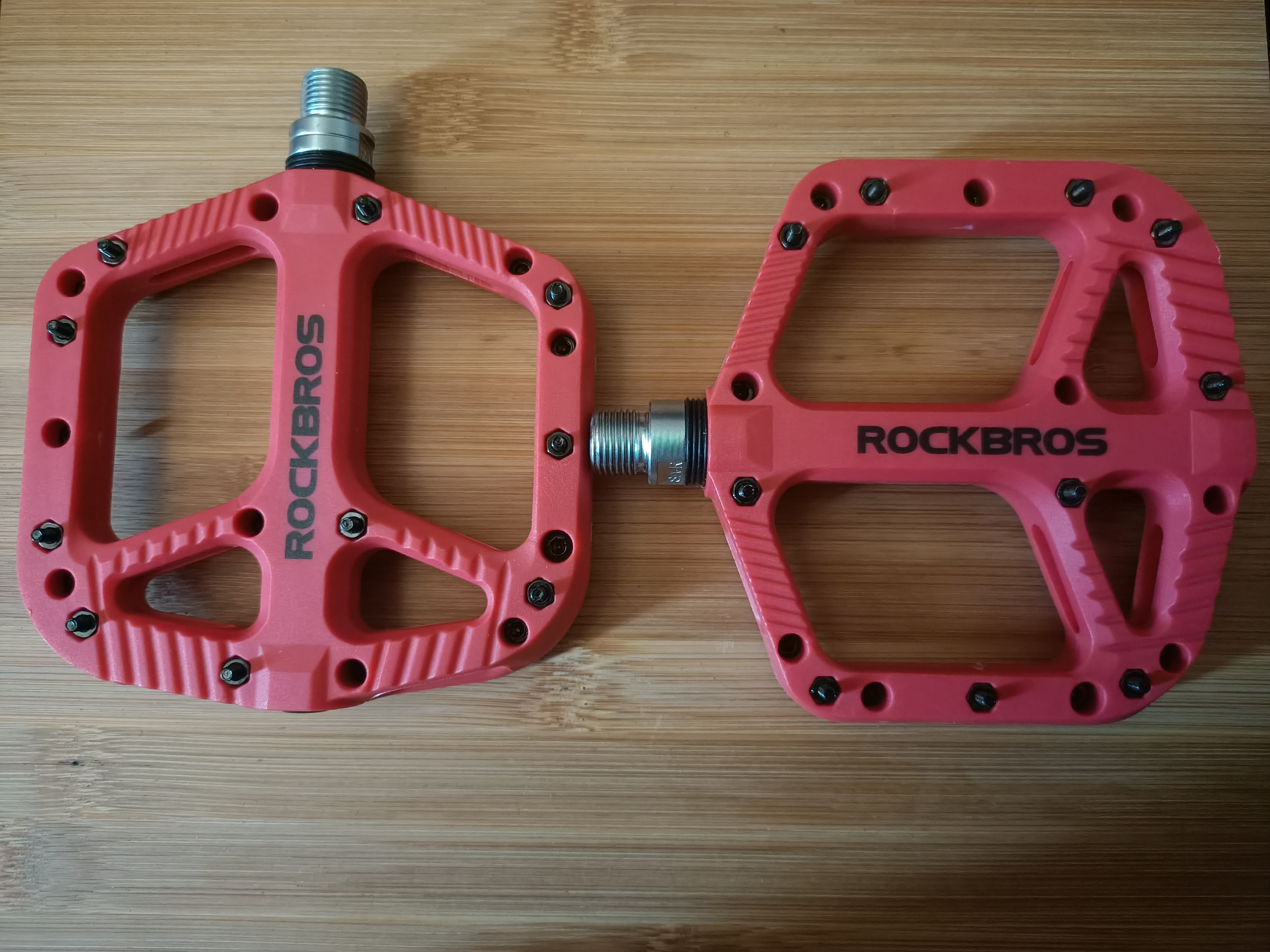
Mountain bike platform pedals made of nylon composite, with replaceable traction pins and sealed bearings.

More expensive platform pedals for the mountain bike market are available with replaceable metal traction pins and cartridge bearings. Lightweight pedals intended for freeride and downhill cycling have been made from exotic metals such as magnesium.

Toe clips typically are generally not installed on this type of pedal because they are considered unsafe by some MTB and BMX riders. In downhill racing, the extra power and grip offered by clipped pedals is used at the risk of clipped in crashing in which the bicycle can potentially stay attached to the foot of the victim. However, fixed gear riders have started using fabric straps instead.

=== Quill ===
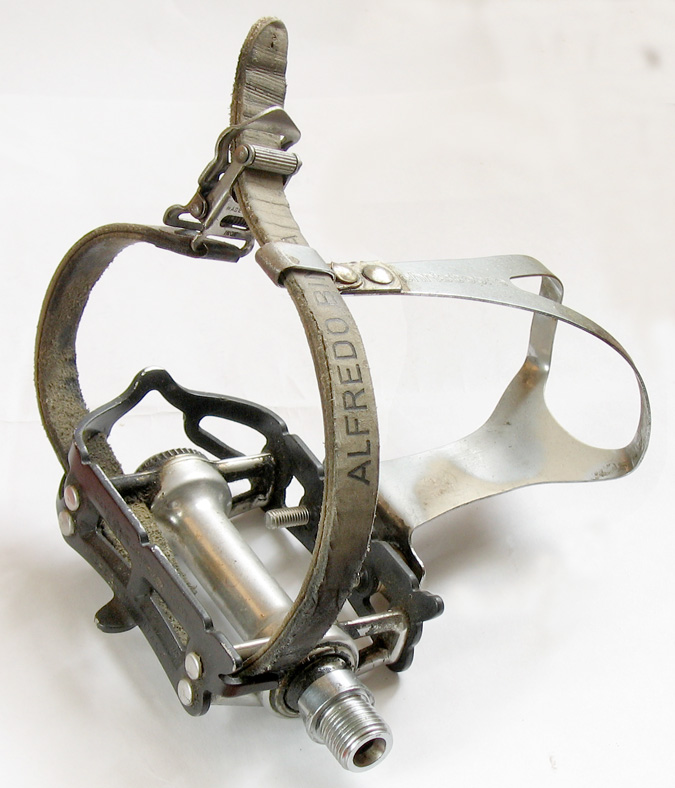
Bicycle pedal, quill road type, with toe clip and toe strap (1970s)

The quill pedal is a common pedal system on bicycles. It consists of a main axle section that is attached to the bicycle crank arm and contains extensions from the axle to which parallel cage plates are attached at the front and rear of the pedal. To use the quill pedal, the cyclist pushes their foot against the platform formed by the parallel cage plates.

To improve the performance of the quill pedal, toe clips were added. The toe clip is a thin metal or plastic attachment to the front cage of the pedal. The toe clip is shaped like the toe of a shoe and its function is to prevent a cyclist's shoe from slipping off the pedal during the forward pedaling motion. A further enhancement of the quill pedal was modifying the toe clip to allow a strap and buckle to go around or through both the pedal and the toe clip to encircle the cyclist's foot on the top of the pedal. This strap is generally made of leather or nylon.

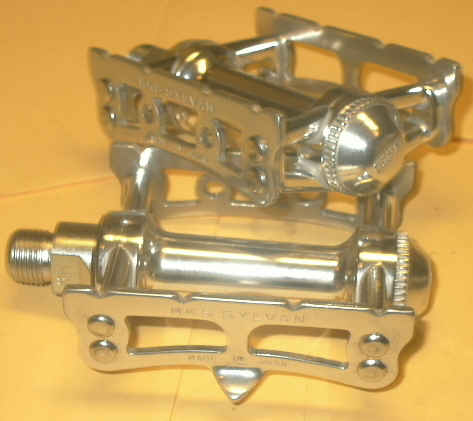
Mikashima track pedal

To further improve the quill pedal's efficiency, a "cleat" was developed. This cleat consists of a small metal or plastic attachment to the cyclist's shoe. The cleat is slotted and is adapted to engage a quill section of the bicycle pedal. The use of the slotted cleat enhances a cyclist's ability over that provided by toe clips and strap, enabling for greater pedaling efficiency. Although quill pedals can be used with smoothed-soled cycling shoes or ordinary shoes, they were designed to be used with cycling shoes which had a slotted shoeplate attached to its sole. The disadvantage with this system is that to remove the shoe from the pedal, a rider had to reach down and loosen the strap by hand or leave the toe strap loose and thus give up some efficiency. This type of pedal and pedal setup was common for racing cyclists until the mid to late 1980s.

Quill pedals are sometimes said to be named for the quill or "pick up tab" on the rear of the pedal. The weight of the toe clip and strap would make the pedal hang upside down, and the rider would tap the quill with their shoe to flip the pedal over so the shoe could be inserted into the pedal.

The main difference between track, road, and touring quill pedals is width. Track pedals are narrow and the front and back plates of the cage are separate, road being a little wider with a one piece cage in a shape of a sideways "U", and touring being the widest to allow for comfort when used with wider, non-racing shoes during longer rides. While quill pedals can be used for mountain biking, the use of clips here is dangerous as they do not grip well. Cage pedals built for mountain biking are typically serrated so that even when muddied, the pedals can be gripped well by any flat shoe.

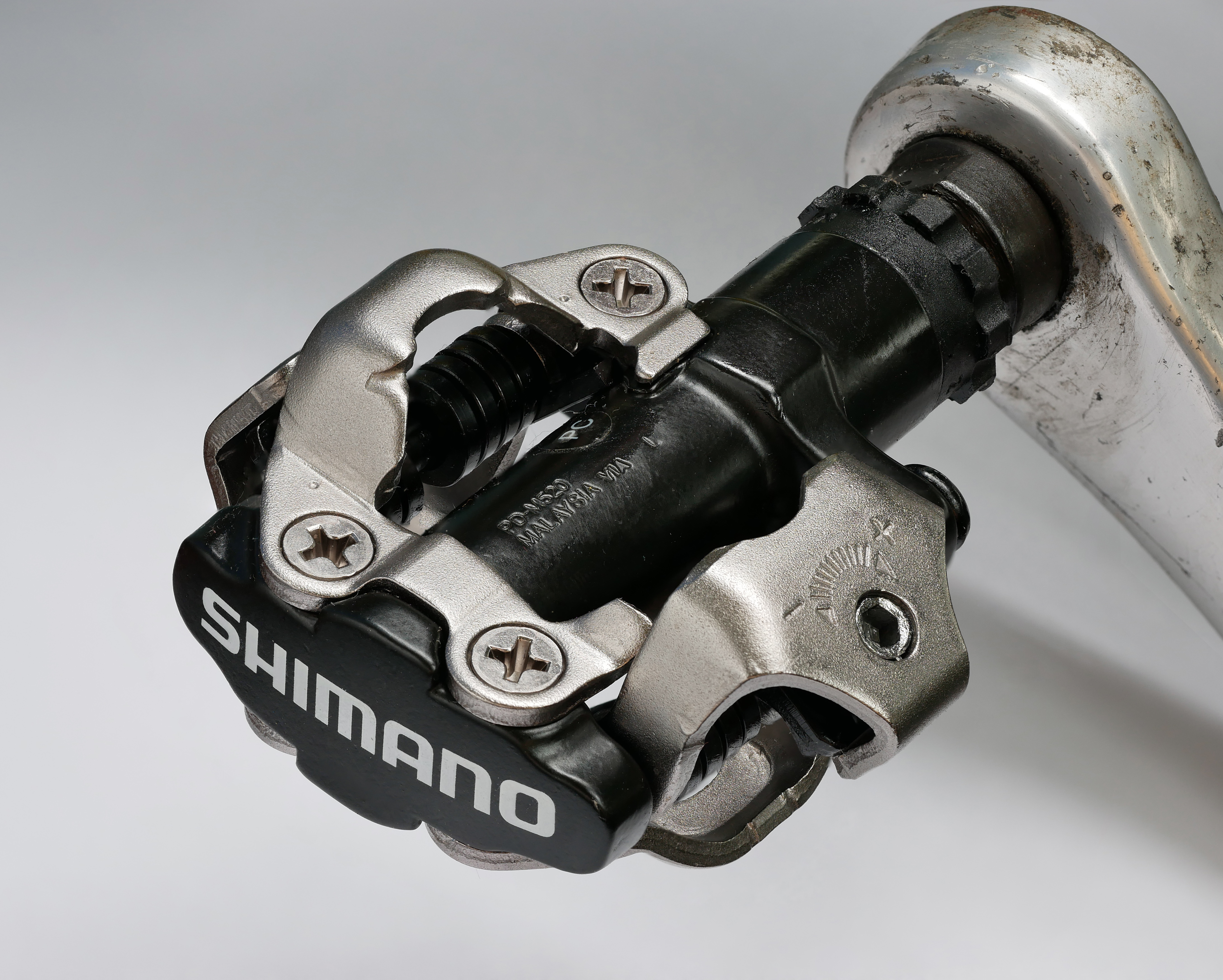
Shimano SPD system

=== Clipless pedals ===
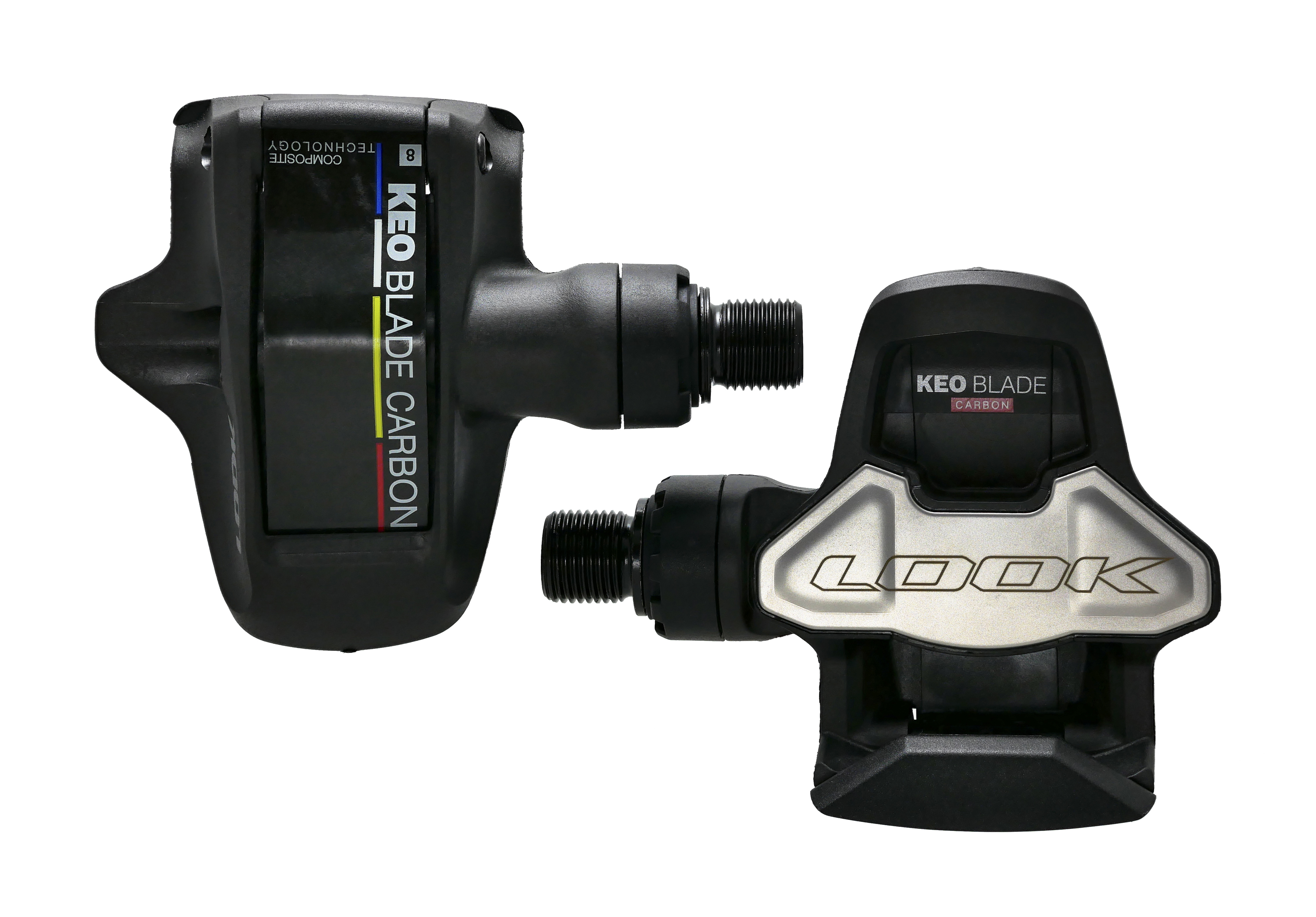
LOOK road pedals

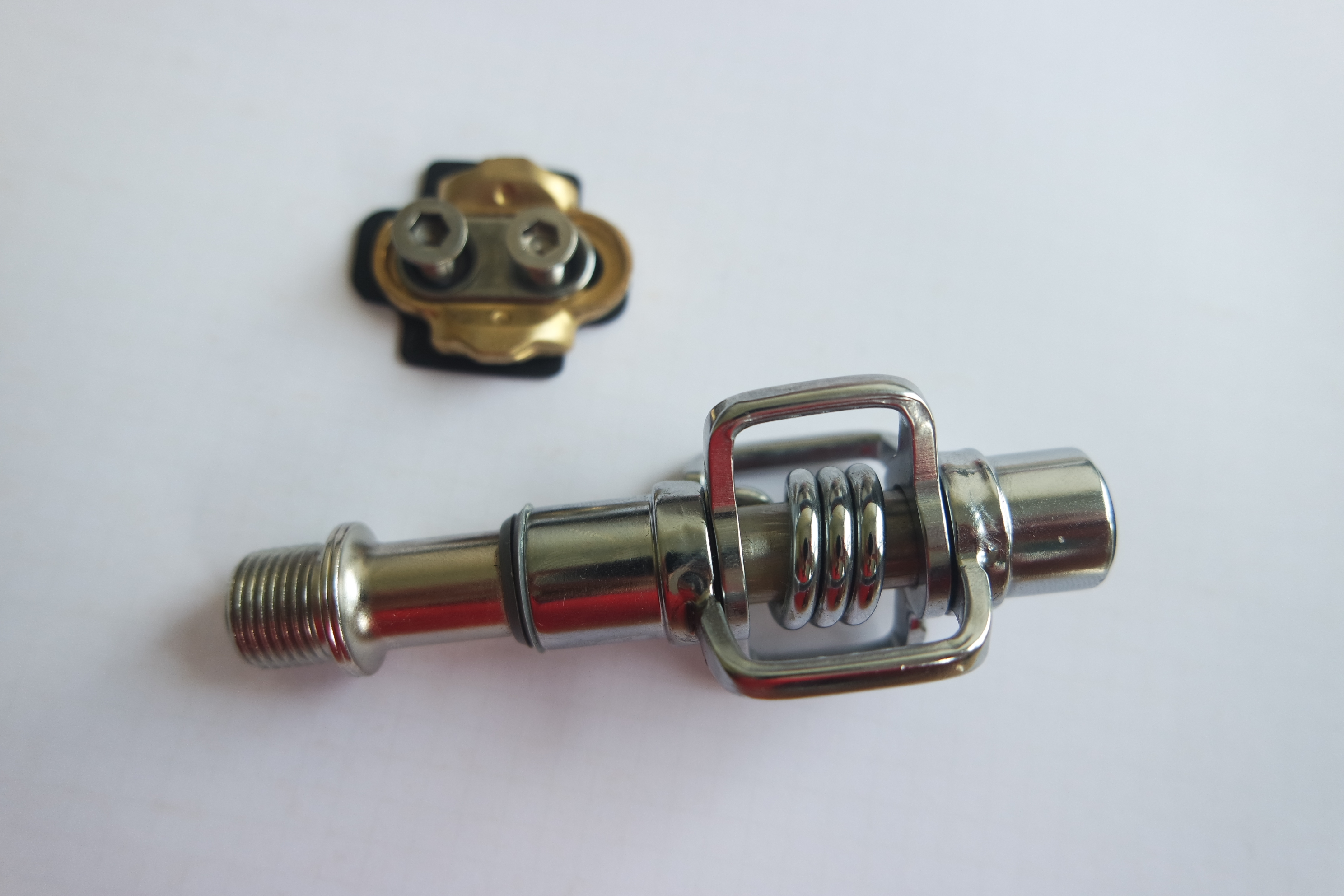
Eggbeater pedal with cleat from Crankbrothers, designed for mountain bikes

Clipless pedals (also clip-in or step-in) require a special cycling shoe with a cleat fitted to the sole, which locks into a mechanism in the pedal and thus holds the shoe firmly to the pedal. Most clipless pedals lock onto the cleat when stepped on firmly and unlock when the heel is twisted outward, although in some cases the locking mechanism is built into the cleat instead of the pedal. Clipless refers to the toe clip (cage) having been replaced by a locking mechanism and not to platform pedals which would normally not have toe clips. The clipless pedal was invented by Charles Hanson in 1895. It allowed the rider to twist the shoe to lock and unlock and had rotational float (the freedom to rotate the shoe slightly to prevent joint strain).

The M71 was a clipless pedal designed by Cino Cinelli and produced by his company in 1971. It used a plastic shoe cleat which slid into grooves in the pedal and locked in place with a small lever located on the back side of the pedal body. To release the shoe a rider had to reach down and operate the lever, similar to the way a racing cyclist had to reach down and loosen the toestrap. The lever was placed on the outside edge of the pedal so that in the event of a fall the lever hitting the ground would release the foot. The pedal was designed for racing, in particular track racing, and because of the need to reach down to them to unclip, they have been referred to as "death cleats".

In 1984, the French company Look applied downhill snow skiing binding or cleat technology to pedals, producing the first widely used clipless pedals. Initially used by triathletes to facilitate faster "transitions", Bernard Hinault's victory in Tour de France in 1985 then helped secure the acceptance of quick-release clipless pedal systems by cyclists. Those pedals, and compatible models by other manufacturers, remain in widespread use today. The cleat is engaged by simply pushing down and forward on the pedal, or, with some designs, by twisting the cleat in sideways. Then, instead of loosening a toestrap or pulling a lever, the cyclist releases a foot from the pedal by twisting the heel outward.

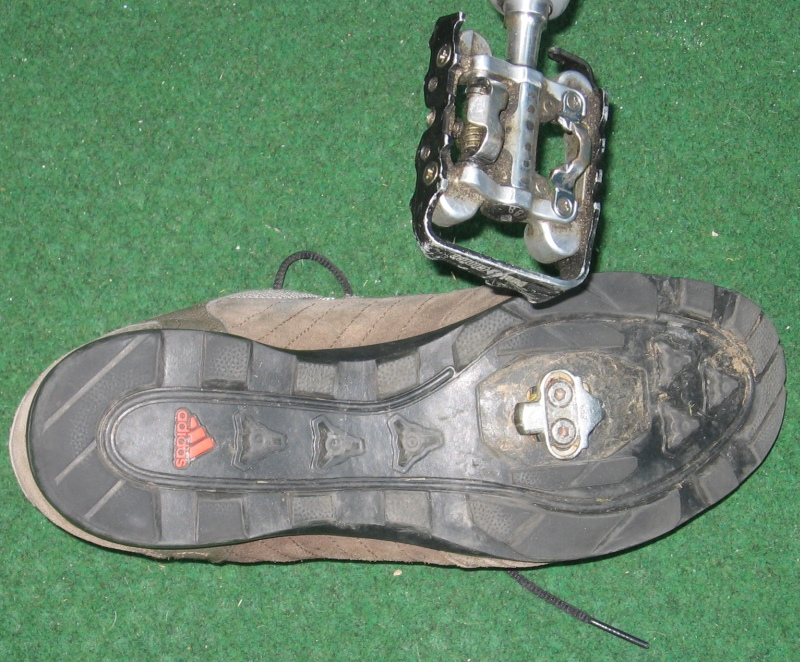
SPD Dual Choice with shoe

The next major development in clipless pedals was Shimano's SPD (Shimano Pedaling Dynamics) pedal system. Whereas Look cleats are large and protrude from the sole of the shoe, SPD cleats are small and could be fitted in a recess in the sole, making it possible to walk (although comfort will vary, as the soles of different cycling shoes vary in their rigidity, depending on design). Cycling shoes have rigid soles to maximize power transfer and efficiency. They may be specific to road or mountain biking, or usable for both. Shoes designed for mountain biking typically have recessed cleats that do not protrude beyond the sole of the shoe, and have treads for walking on trails, as walking or carrying the bike is often required. Road cycling shoes are typically lighter than their mountain bike counterparts, and feature a protruding cleat and less weatherproofing. The protruding cleat makes these shoes impractical for walking, as doing so can damage the cleat. Mountain bike cleats can generally be mounted without difficulty to road shoes although sometimes an adapter is required. Such attachment is not usually possible for road pedals, as the cleats are normally too large to be mounted on mountain shoes. The smaller mountain bike cleats are attached to the sole of the shoe by two bolts; larger road-specific cleats are attached by three. Various manufacturers have produced their own designs of clipless pedal systems over the years.

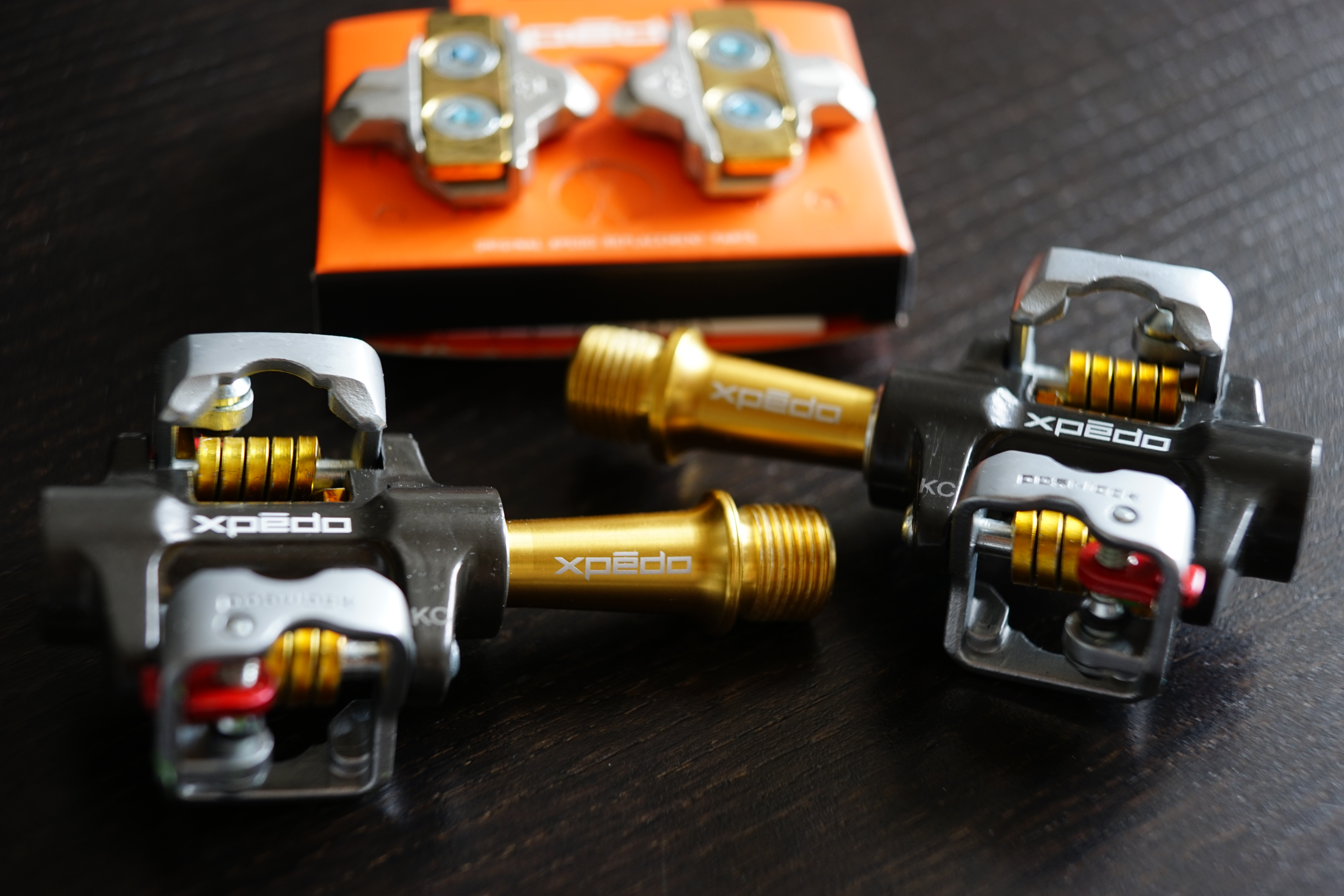
Xpedo M-FORCE 4 TI pedals with six-degree float

Platform adapters are designed to temporarily convert clipless pedals into more traditional platform pedals which have a larger and flatter area for the foot to rest on. Clipless pedals can have advantages over flat ones, especially in mountain biking and racing. They keep the foot from slipping in wet and muddy conditions and provide better transfer of power. Clipless pedal platform adapters are innovative devices designed to convert regular platform pedals into a temporary clipless pedal system. These adapters provide cyclists with a bridge between traditional flat pedals and clipless pedals, allowing them to experiment with the benefits of clipless riding without immediately committing to dedicated clipless shoes. They can be fastened by using bolts but as they are normally in temporary use, it is also common for them to be mounted using different snap-on techniques. Although it is possible to use clipless pedals with regular footwear, they will be much less comfortable than platform pedals, as the shoe sole is more likely to bend or slip. Despite wide usage, there is no proven advantage of clipless pedals over flat pedals in pedaling effectiveness, net mechanical efficiency, and muscular activity for both non-cyclists and elite cyclists.

==== Float and tension ====
Float is defined as the degree of movement offered by the cleat within the pedal before release begins. This can be highly important to prevent damage to knees, as most people's legs do not remain in a single plane as they pedal. Many standard road pedal systems offer cleats with a six-degree float. SPD-SL, Look Delta, Look Kéo, and Time cleats are also available in three-degree and zero-degree float. Road pedal systems commonly colour-code cleats by the amount of float offered. Some pedal systems have a fixed (non-adjustable) float, such as six degrees for Crankbrothers and 4.5 degrees for the Kéo Easy. Most cleats develop more float as they wear. Clipless float pedals significantly attenuate the applied moment without reducing the power transmitted to the bike suggesting using float systems to reduce or prevent knee pain.

=== Magnet pedals ===
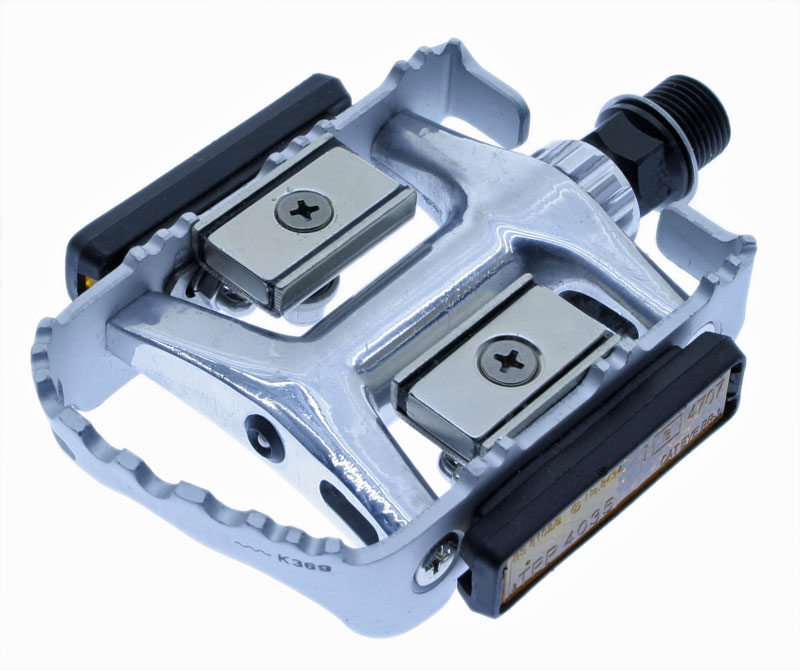
Davtus magnet pedal

Magnetic pedals were introduced as early as 1897, and the Exus Mag Flux Road was available in 1996. Norbert Sadler and Wolfgang Duerr filed for a patent in 2005, and it has not been granted as of 2012. Established bicycle component manufacturer, Mavic, introduced a magnetic pedal and dedicated shoe for casual riding in 2009. Others have received mixed reviews.

=== Folding ===
To maximize compactness, folding bicycles often have pedals that fold as well.

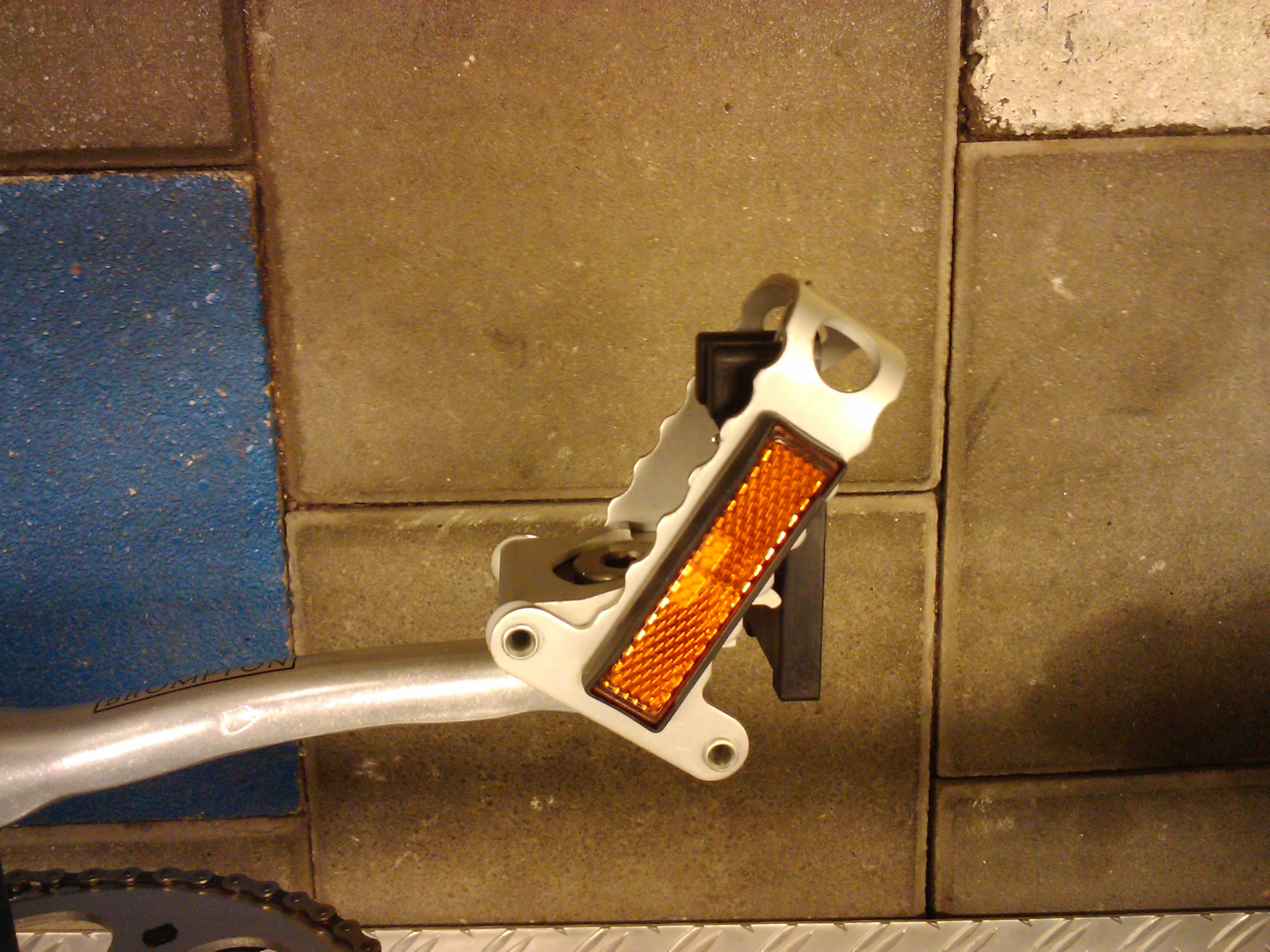
Folding pedal on a Brompton bicycle

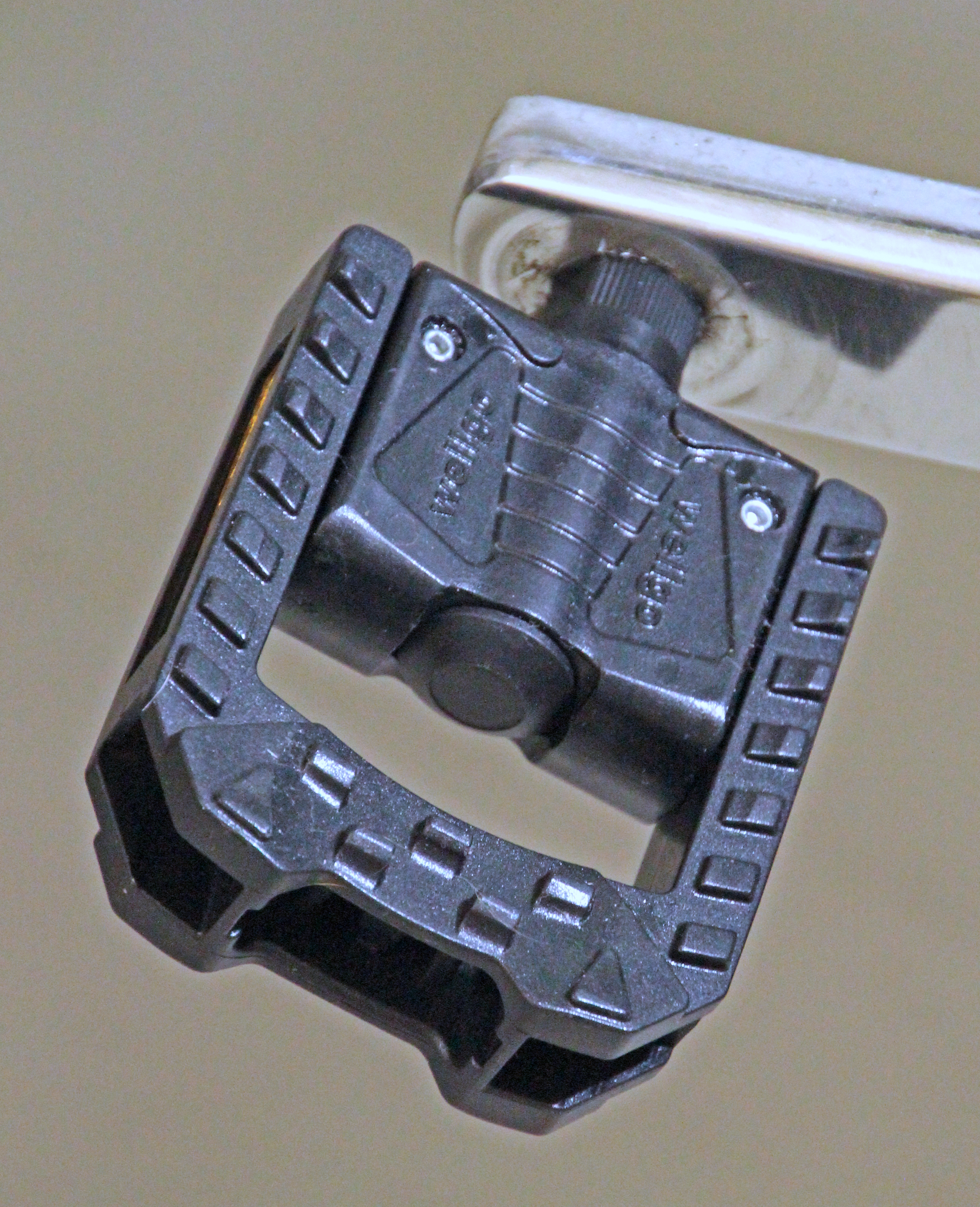
Folding pedal on a standard bicycle, unfolded...

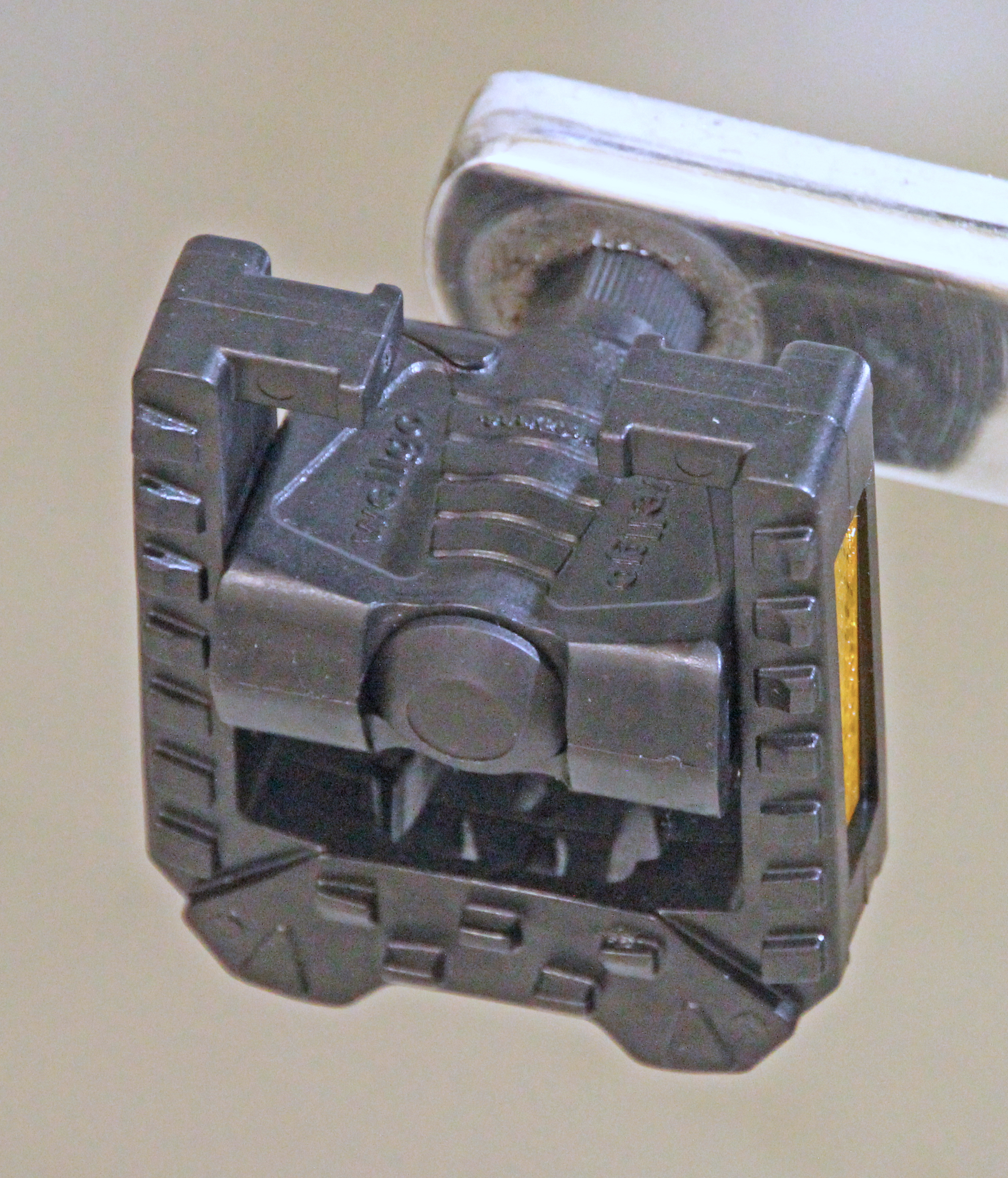
...and folded

== Attachment ==
The pedal spindle is threaded to match a threaded hole at the outboard end of the cranks. Multi-piece cranks have a 9/16-inch (14.29 mm) hole with 20 TPI (a diameter/pitch combination fairly unique to this application). One-piece cranks use a 1/2-inch (12.7 mm) by 20 TPI hole. French pedal spindles use M14 × 1.25 (14 mm (0.551 in) metric diameter with 1.25 mm (0.049 in) pitch) threads, and thread loosely into a 9/16 pedal hole. The threading size is often stamped into the crank, near the pedal hole.

The right-side (usually the drive-side) pedal spindle is right-hand threaded, and the left-side (usually the non-drive-side) pedal spindle is left-hand (reverse) threaded to help prevent it from becoming loose by an effect called precession.

Although the left pedal turns clockwise on its bearing relative to the crank (and so would seem to tighten a right-hand thread), the force from the rider's foot presses the spindle against the crank thread at a point which rolls around clockwise with respect to the crank, thus slowly pulling the outside of the pedal spindle anticlockwise (counterclockwise) because of friction, and thus would loosen a right-hand thread.

For a short time in the early 1980s, Shimano made pedals and matching cranks that had a 1-inch (25.4 mm) by 24 TPI interface. This was to allow a larger single bearing, as these pedals were designed to work with just one bearing on the crank side rather than the conventional design of one smaller bearing on each side.

== Bearings ==
Bearings are the mechanical component that allows the spindle to rotate freely within the pedal body. Without them, pedals will rub directly against the spindle, causing high friction, accelerated wear, and making pedalling difficult. Smooth bearings enable efficient transfer of power from the cyclist's legs to the bike's drivetrain. Over time, bearings can wear and may need to be replaced.

There are different types of bearings that includes:

- Cartridge bearings - Pre-assembled units, typically sealed ball bearings, designed to keep dirt out longer than traditional ball bearings. Unlike loose, unsealed ball bearings, they cannot be disassembled and must be replaced once worn. They are generally not found on very cheap bikes.
- Sealed DU Bearings (Self-lubricating Bushings) - Has relatively few moving parts which reduces chance of malfunction, and is more tolerant of dirt than ball bearings. They can handle more stress and abuse than ball bearings of same size, but are disposable and must be replaced when worn.
- Loose Ball Bearings - Allows smoother rotation compared with Sealed DU bearings. If the ball bearings themselves are unsealed, they can be serviced: disassembled, cleaned and re-lubricated, and any damaged balls replaced.

== See also ==
- Animation of a bicycle pedal
- Crankset
- Cycling shoe
- Treadle
