= Micro drive =

Bicycle drivetrain

Micro drive is a type of bicycle drivetrain, mostly BMX and MTB, that uses smaller than standard-sized sprockets. The smallest rear sprocket that fits on a freehub body is a 10 or 11-tooth, but with the use of a cassette hub, sometimes called a micro drive rear hub, sprockets as small as 8 teeth may be used.

Some examples of micro drive hubs are Shimano Microspline (12-speed, 10-teeth) and SRAM XD/XDR (11/12-speed, 9-teeth or 10-teeth).

== Reduced weight and increased ground clearance ==
The advantage of micro drive is that it means a smaller front sprocket, or chainring, can be used without affecting the gear ratio, providing better ground clearance. For example, a bike using a 32-tooth chainring with a 16-tooth rear sprocket can switch to using an 18-tooth chainring and a 9-tooth sprocket, and still have a 2:1 ratio. Another advantage is the reduction in weight with the reduction in size of all the parts.

== Increased wear and costs ==
The disadvantage is increased stresses on the drive train, leading to increased wear and even premature failure. As the front and rear sprockets become smaller, the tension in the chain increases, and stretching and breaking can occur more easily. Designers can overcome these issues by choosing materials with higher yield strengths, however usually at higher costs.
