= Front freewheel =

Bicycle drivetrain system

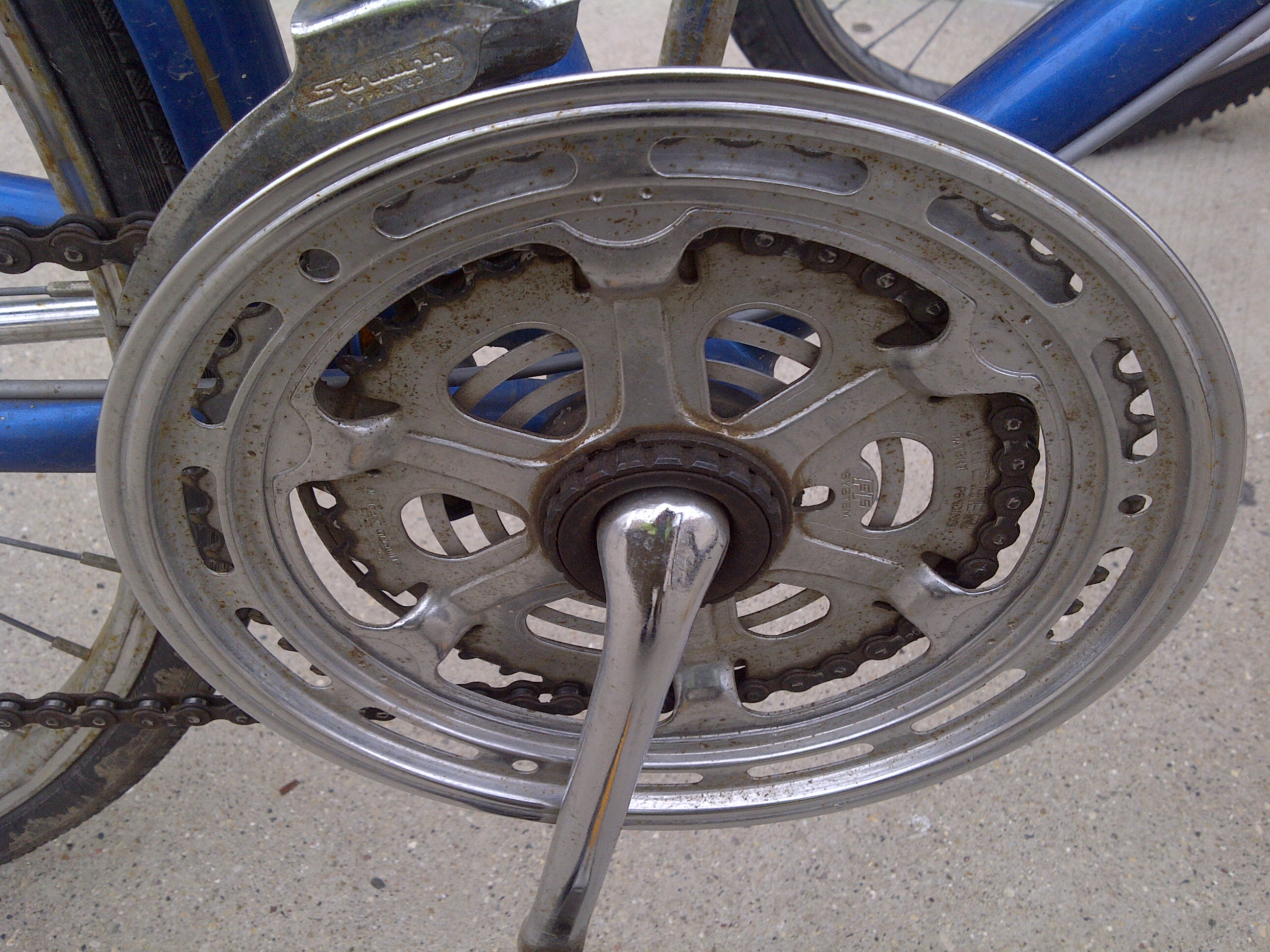
Integer FF crankset on Schwinn Suburban

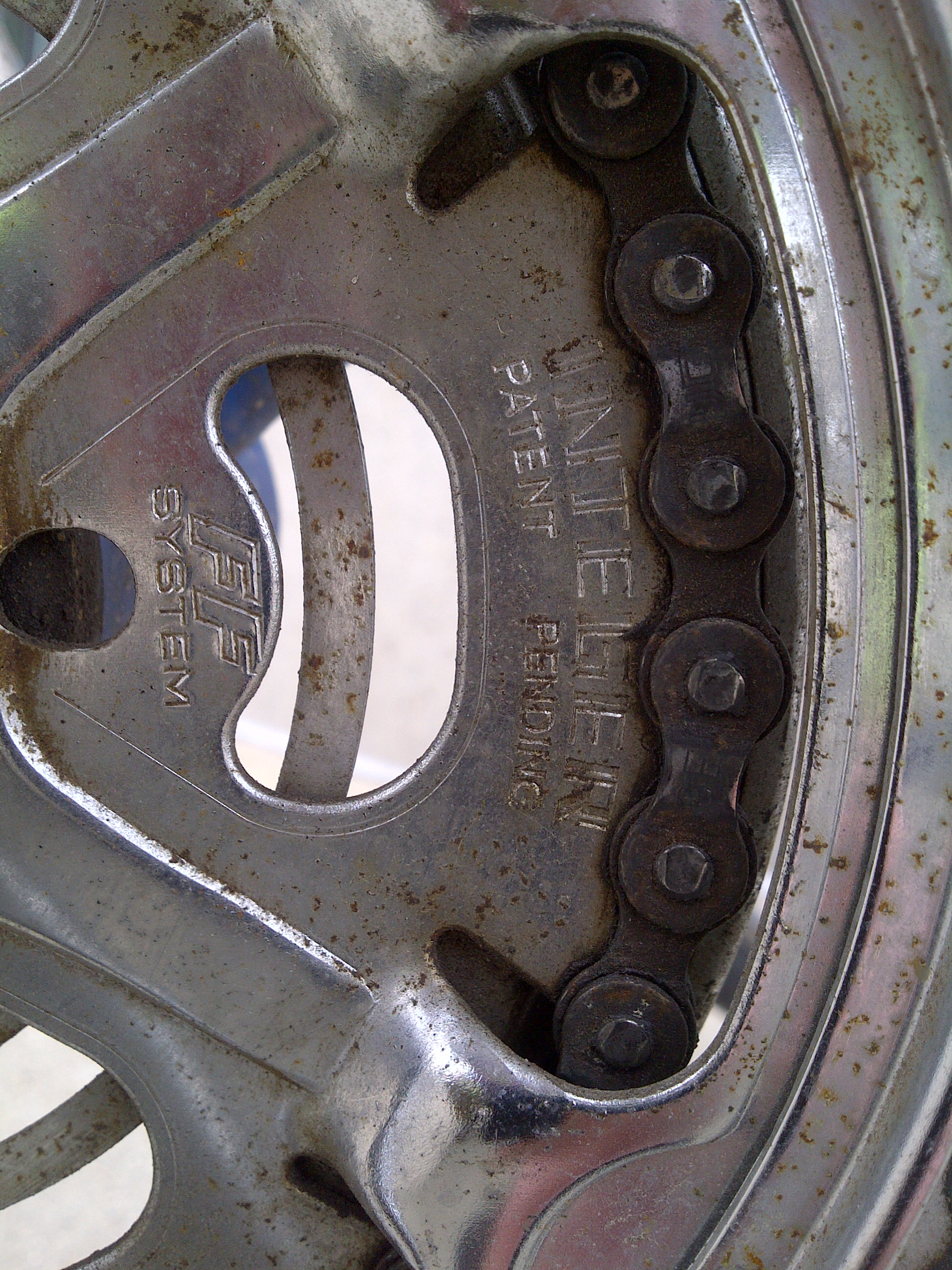
Detail showing logo

A front freewheel or freewheel crank is a freewheel mechanism used on some bicycles which enables the drivetrain of the bicycle to continue spinning while the rider stops pedaling (coasts). Unlike regular bicycles, a front freewheel can make it possible to shift gears using a derailleur while the rider is coasting if paired with a fixed rear hub or a freehub with a slight resistance in the freewheel mechanism, which causes the chain to continue spinning with the wheel rotation.

Freewheels in bottom brackets have been used on some pedelec and are necessary parts for all mid-drive systems to allow the electric motors to work inside their optimal rotational speed ranges. A mid-mounted motor is mounted near the crankset, as opposed to a front-mounted motor, which sits in the front hub, or a rear-mounted motor, which sits in the rear hub.

== History ==
The Shimano Front Freewheel (FFS) was a proprietary bicycle drivetrain design of the 1970s that placed a freewheel between the pedal cranks and the front chainrings – enabling the rider to shift gears while coasting. FFS rear freewheel is different than a standard freewheel because it's "stiff" with more friction than a normal rear freewheel. It will slip if necessary however, to stop the chain in the event of, for example, a clothing tangle – which could otherwise lead to injuries of the leg by the drivetrain, crashing of the bicycle, or both.

FFS marketing followed Shimano's then-current path of beginning with lower-cost implementations of the system using low tech and usually heavier materials. The resulting system was substantially heavier than the standard freewheel and, in any event, did not penetrate the market noticeably, although Panasonic, Ross, Schwinn, and Raleigh briefly equipped bicycles with FFS. The late Sheldon Brown called FFS a "solution in search of a problem."

Non-proprietary front freewheels can currently be found on bikes used for bike trials riding, such as the Honda RN-01 G-cross. Such a system allows for the use of cheaper fixed-gear rear hubs instead of cassette hubs, lower gear ratios, and increased ground clearance at the bottom bracket.
