= Shimano =

Japanese manufacturer of bicycle components, fishing tackle and rowing equipment

Shimano, Inc.

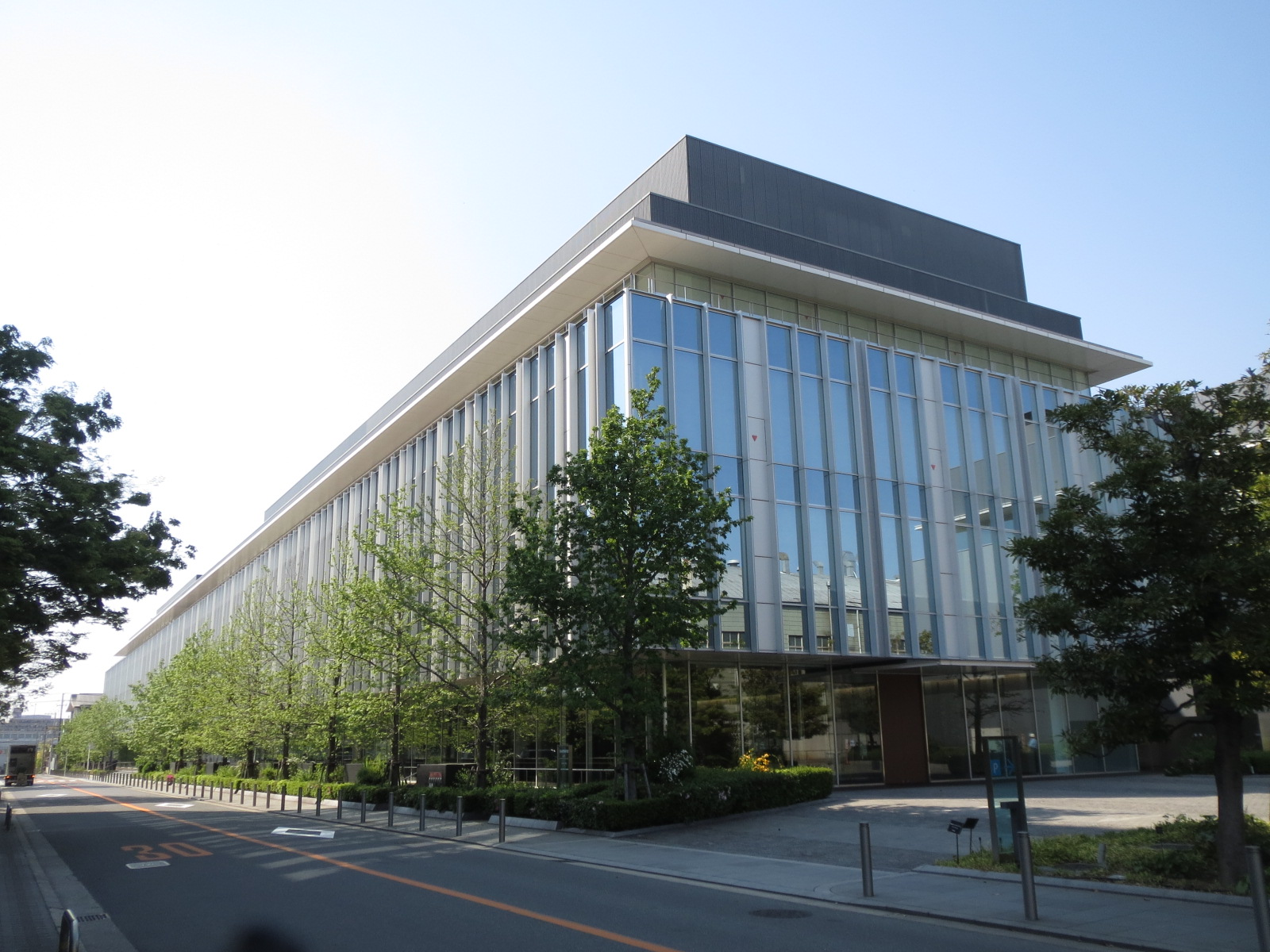
- Shimano headquarters in Sakai
- Type: Public KK
- Traded as: TYO: 7309
- Industry: Leisure/Transport
- Founded: February 1921; 105 years ago
- Founders: Shozaburo Shimano
- Headquarters: 3-77 Oimatsu-cho, Sakai-ku, Sakai, Osaka Prefecture 590-8577, Japan
- Key people: Yozo Shimano (CEO), Taizo Shimano (President)
- Products: Cycling components; Fishing tackle; Rowing equipment; BMW Motorrad components (Japan only)
- Revenue: ▲$2.872 billion (FY2024) (¥450.993 billion) (FY2024)
- Net income: ▲$0.486 billion (FY 2024) (¥76.329 billion) (FY2024)
- Number of employees: 10,130 (Dec 31, 2014)
- Website: Official website

Shimano, Inc. (株式会社シマノ, Kabushiki-gaisha Shimano), originally Shimano Iron Works (島野鐵工所) and later Shimano Industries, Inc. (島野工業株式会社), is a Japanese multinational manufacturing company for cycling components, fishing tackle and rowing equipment, which also produced golf supplies until 2005 and snowboarding gear until 2008. Named after founder Shozaburo Shimano (島野庄三郎, 1894–1958) and headquartered in Sakai, Osaka Prefecture, the company has 49 consolidated subsidiaries, with the primary manufacturing plants based in Kunshan (China), Malaysia, and Singapore.

In 2024, Shimano recorded revenue of US$2.87 billion, of which 48.9% in Asia, 35.6% in Europe, 10.4% in North America, and 5.1% the rest of the world. Bicycle components represented 76.6%, fishing tackle 23.3%, and other products 0.1%. The company is publicly traded, with 89.45 million shares of common stock outstanding.

They are also the official neutral support for most of the UCI World Tour.

== Cycling ==
Shimano sales constitute an estimated 85% of the global bicycle component market by value. Its products include drivetrain, brake, wheel, and pedal components for road, mountain, track, and hybrid bikes. The components include cranksets comprising cranks and chainrings, bottom brackets, chains, rear chain sprockets and cassettes, front and rear wheel hubs, gear shift levers, brakes, brake levers, cables, and front and rear dérailleurs. Shimano Total Integration (STI) is Shimano's integrated shifter and brake lever combination for road bicycles. The Italian firm Campagnolo as well as US-based SRAM are Shimano's primary competitors in the cycling marketplace.

When the 1970s United States bike boom exceeded the capacity of the European bicycle component manufacturers, Japanese manufacturers SunTour and Shimano rapidly stepped in to fill the void. While both companies provided products for all price ranges of the market, SunTour also focused on refinement of existing systems and designs for higher-end products, while Shimano initially paid more attention to rethinking the basic systems and bringing out innovations such as Positron shifting (a precursor to index shifting) and front freewheel systems at the low end of the market. In the 1980s, with Shimano pushing technical innovation and lower prices, the more traditional European component manufacturers lost significant market share. During this period, in contrast to the near-universal marketing technique of introducing innovations on the expensive side of the marketplace and relying on consumer demand to emulate early adopters along with economy of scale to bring them into the mass market, Shimano and SunTour (to a lesser extent) introduced new technologies at the lowest end of the bicycle market, using lower cost and often heavier and less durable materials and techniques, only moving them further upmarket if they established themselves in the lower market segments.

In the 1980–1983 period, Shimano introduced three groupsets with "AX" technology: Dura-Ace and 600 (high-end), and Adamas in the low-end. Features of these components include aerodynamic styling, center-pull brakes, brake levers with concealed cables, and ergonomic pedals. By 1985 Shimano introduced innovation only at the highest quality level (Dura-Ace for road bikes and XT for mountain bikes), then trickled the technology down to lower production levels as it became proven and accepted. Innovations include index shifting (known as SIS, Shimano Index System introduced in 1984), freehubs, dual-pivot brakes, 8-9-10-speed drivetrains, and the integration of shifters and brake levers. Also, these components could only work properly when used with other Shimano components; for example, its rear derailleurs have to be used with the correct Shimano gear levers, cables, freehub, and cassette. SunTour tried to catch up, but by the end of the 1980s they had lost the technological and commercial battle, and Shimano had become the largest manufacturer of bicycle components in the world.

Shimano components
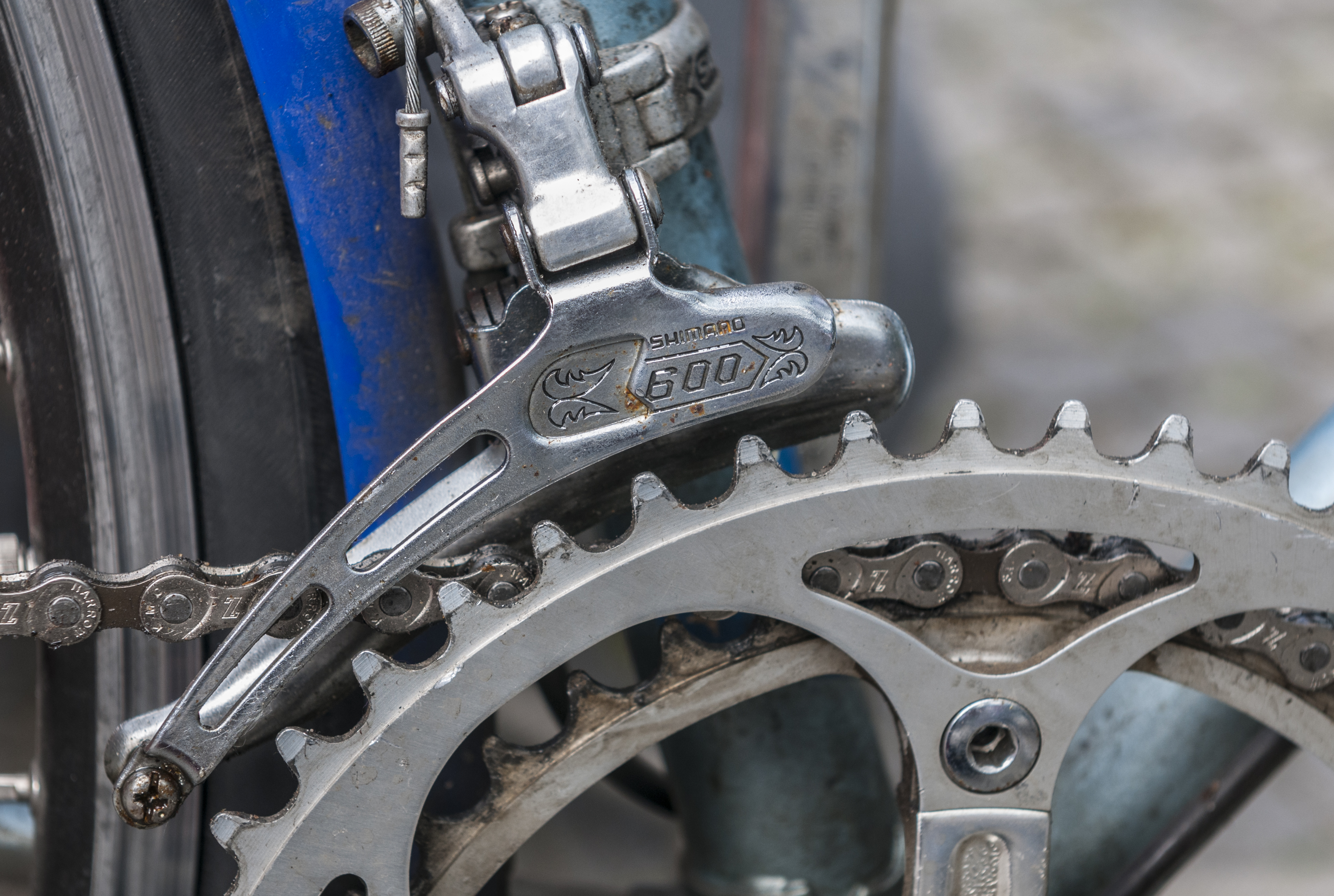
Shimano 600, mid 1980s.

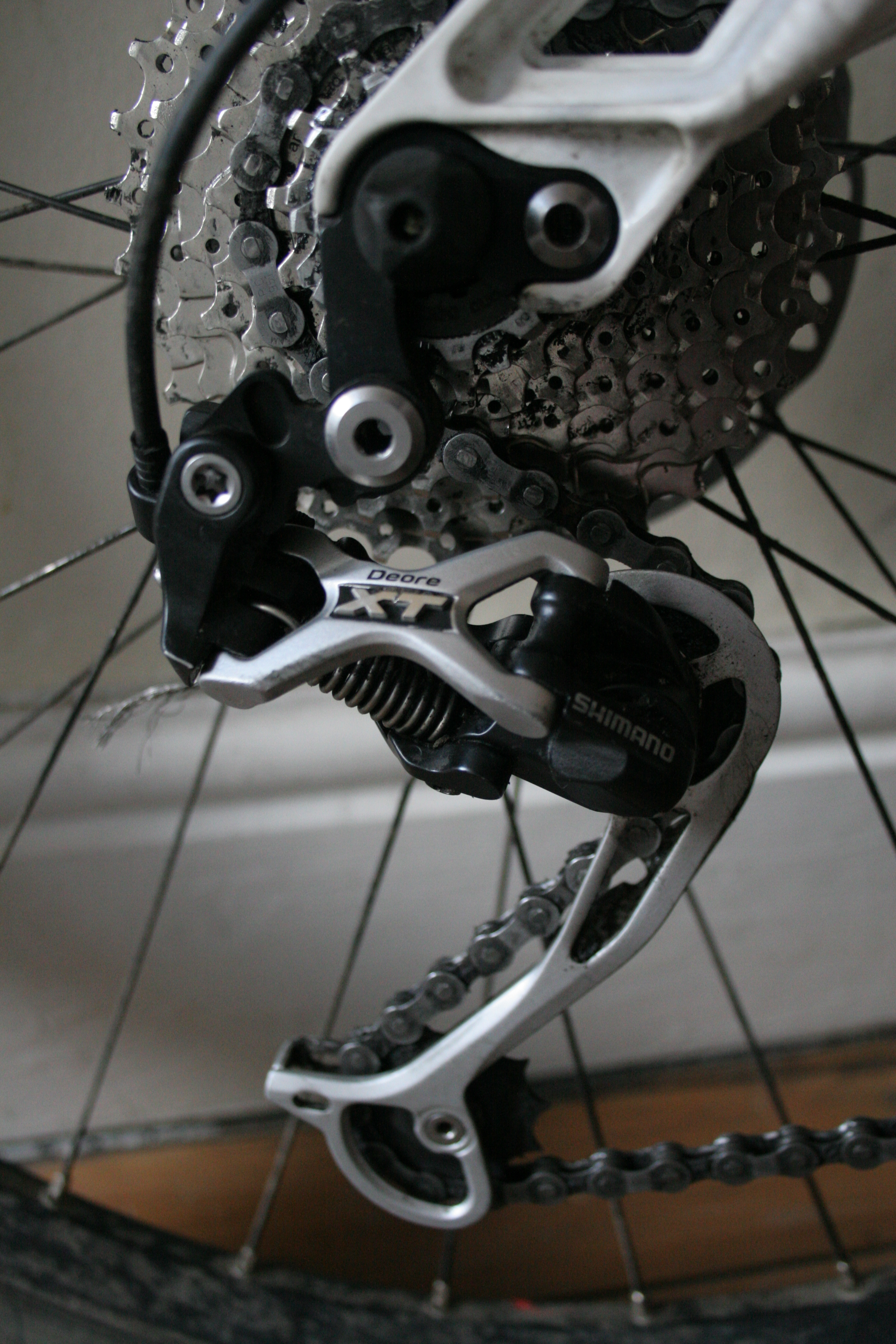
A 2008 Shimano XT rear derailleur.

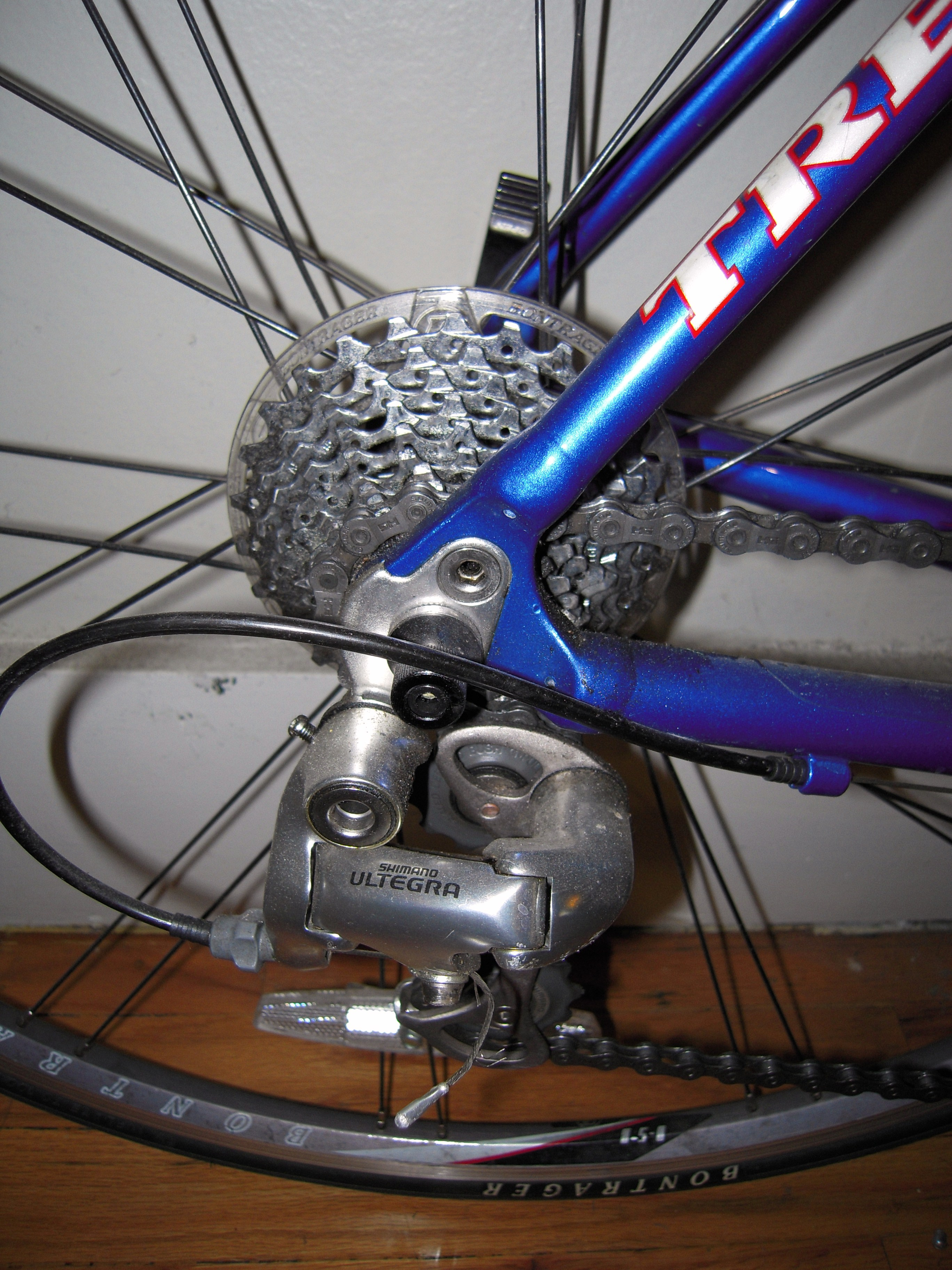
Ultegra 6500 9-speed road bike

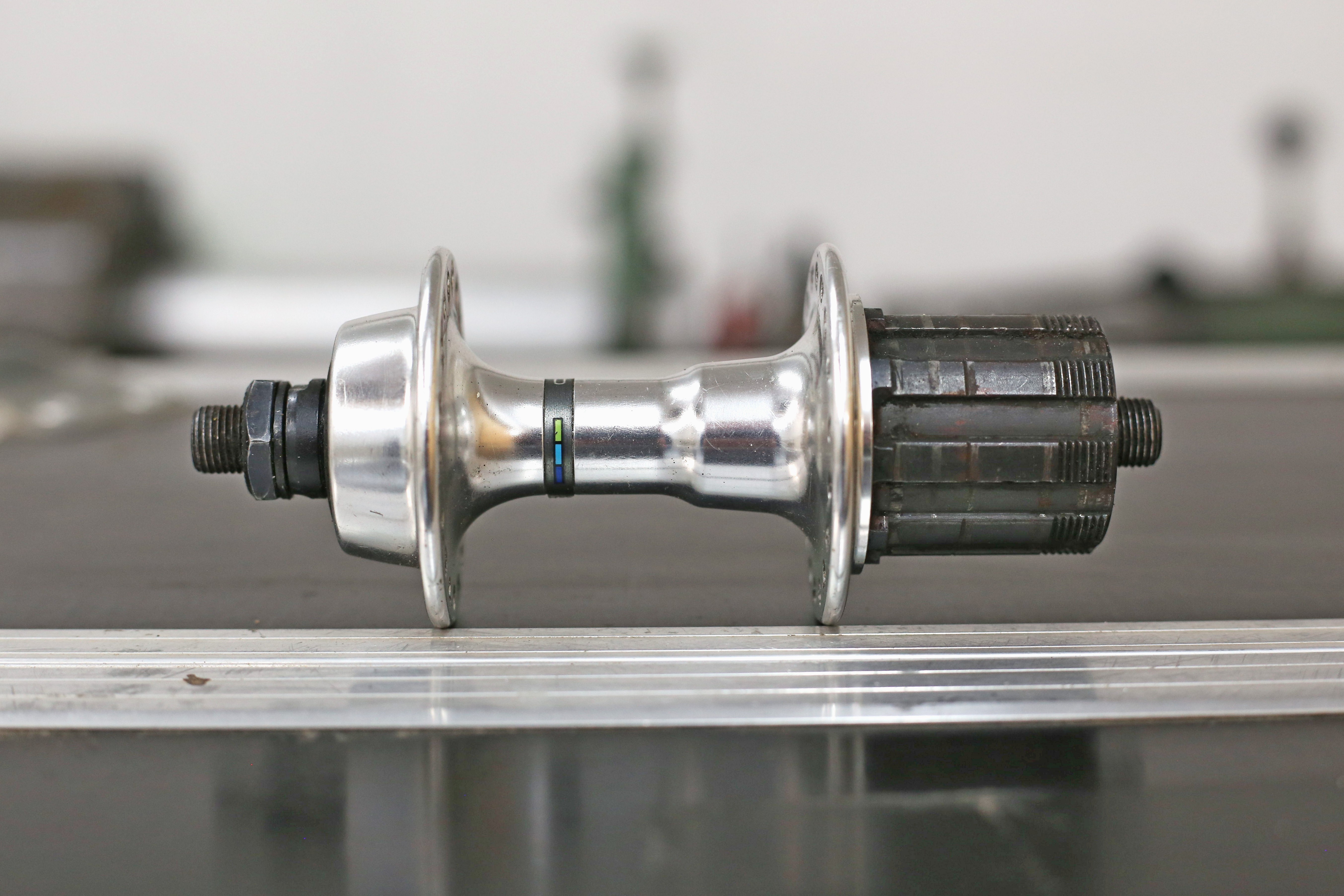
Shimano 600 tricolor rear hub FH6402 components.

Shimano's marketplace domination that developed in the 1990s quickly led to the perception by some critics that Shimano had become a marketplace bully with monopolistic intentions. This viewpoint was based on the fact that Shimano became oriented towards integrating all of their components with each other, with the result being that if any Shimano components were to be used, then the entire bike would need to be built from matching Shimano components. The alternative perspective is that by controlling the mix of components on the bicycle, a manufacturer such as Shimano can control how well their own product functions. Shimano's primary competitors (Campagnolo and SRAM) also make proprietary designs that limit the opportunity to mix and match componentry.

In 2003 Shimano introduced "Dual Control" to mountain bikes, where the gear shift mechanism is integrated into the brake levers. This development was controversial, as the use of Dual Control integrated shifting for hydraulic disc brakes required using Shimano hydraulic disc brakes, locking competitors out of the premium end of the market. However, with their 2007 product line, Shimano moved back to making separate braking and shifting components fully available in addition to the integrated "Dual Control" components, a move to satisfy riders that wished to use Shimano shifting with other brands of disc brakes.

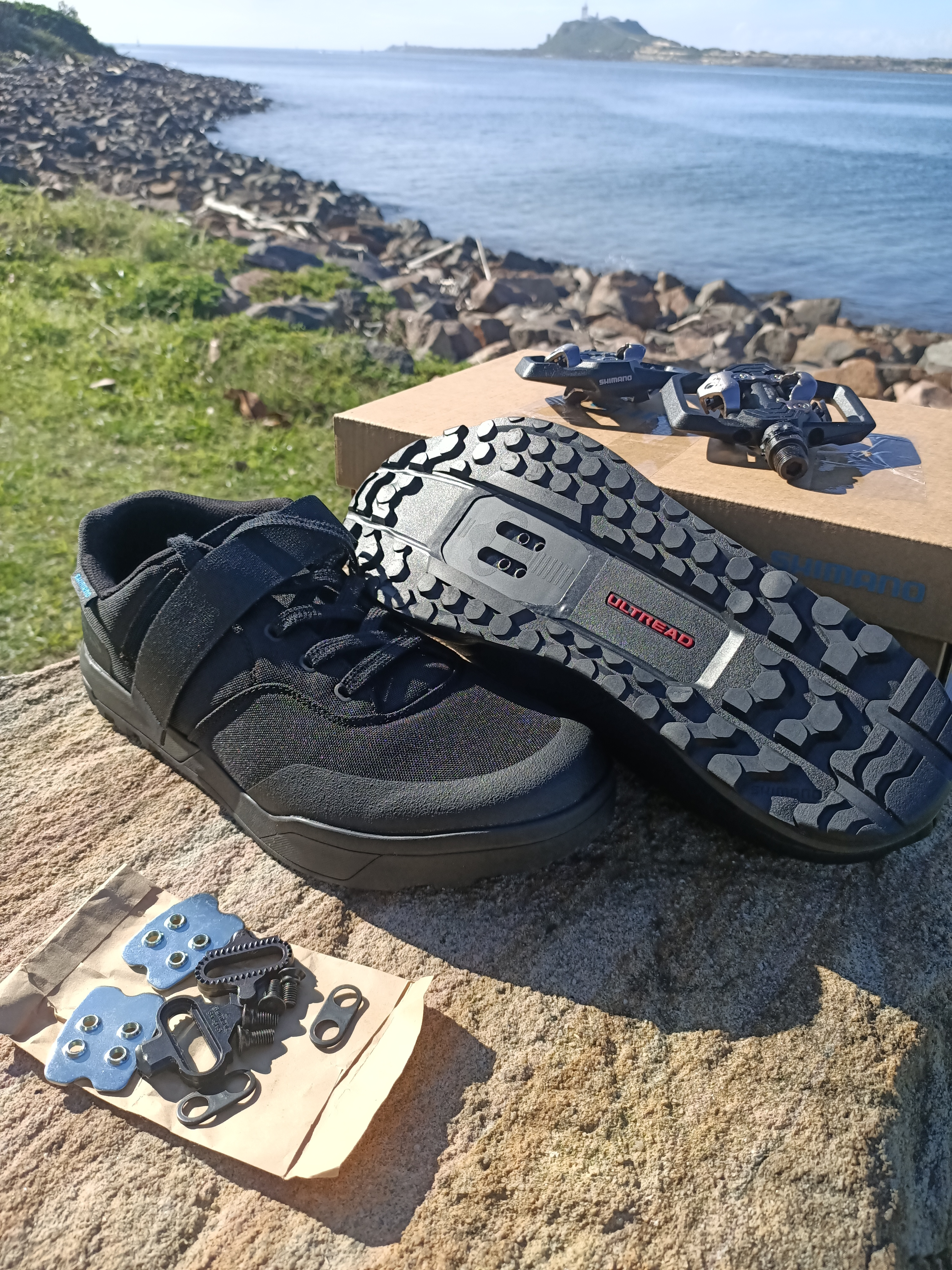
Shimano ME700 SPD pedals with SM-SH51 cleats and GE500 MTB shoes, showing a Shimano SPD clipless system.

Shimano in 1990 introduced the Shimano Pedaling Dynamics (SPD) range of clipless pedals and matching shoes, designed so that the shoes could be used for walking. The shoes have a recess in the bottom of the sole for fitting the smaller cleats and therefore it does not protrude, while conventional clipless road pedals are designed for road cycling shoes that have smooth soles with large protruding cleats, which are awkward for walking. The SPD range, in addition to other off-road refinements, was designed to be used with treaded soles that more closely resemble rugged hiking boots. SPD pedals and shoes soon established themselves as the market standard in this sector, although many other manufacturers have developed alternatives that may be less prone to being clogged by mud or easier to adjust. However, the SPD dominance in this sector has meant that alternative pedal manufacturers nearly always design their pedals to be usable with Shimano shoes, and likewise mountain bike shoe manufacturers make their shoes "Shimano SPD" compatible. SPD has spawned two types of road cleats that are incompatible with standard SPD pedals and some shoes – SPD-R and SPD-SL. SPD-R is a now-defunct pedal standard. SPD-SL is basically a copy of the standard Look clipless pedal system. It has a wide, one-sided platform and a triangular cleat that is Look three-bolt compatible.

=== Shimano products ===
Name	Description
Shimano Alfine	The Alfine 700 is an internally geared hub with 8 or 11-speeds, weighing less than 1700 grams (auxiliary components not included). The product was introduced to the market in 2010. It comprises four stepped planetary series offering up to eleven speeds.
Biopace	Biopace chainrings. Is the Shimano tradename for a type of ovoid cycle chainring manufactured from 1983 to 1993. Biopace chainrings are non round, but unlike traditional oval chainrings which tend to have the largest effective gearing coincide with the downstroke, with Biopace the rings are oriented so the effectively reduced chainring diameter now coincides with the cranks being (at or near) horizontal, and the increased chainring diameter coincides with the pedals being close to TDC and BDC. The reasoning behind this is that it smooths the pedaling action, allowing the rider to carry a lot of momentum through the (downwards-based) power stroke, having it smoothly removed at the bottom of the stroke.
Dyna Drive	A pedal system with no pedal axle and with the bearings located in the part of the pedal which screws into the crank. This required an oversized hole in the crank 25mm (1" diameter) to accept the Dyna Drive pedals. The theory behind this was to allow the foot to be lower than the pedal axle for better biomechanics. This system was relatively short lived, one reason being that the pedal bearings wore out quickly. However, they were used by Alexi Grewal (USA) in his gold medal-winning ride in the 1984 Olympic cycling road race in Los Angeles.
Freehub	Shimano introduced a combined rear hub and freewheel in the late 1970s which they named "freehub". But it did not catch on, as its arrangement of internally splined sprockets sliding onto the matching externally splined freehub was incompatible with the then standard separate hub and screw-on freewheel. When a larger number of rear sprockets came to be used, the freehub concept was re-introduced and is now the dominant rear hub type. Freehub style hubs are inherently stronger than screw-on sprocket and freewheel setups because it allows the bearings on the drive side of the hub to sit nearer to the end of the hub axle, reducing bending in the axle caused by chain tension and rider weight, a significant problem leading to fatigue failure in many axles as 6 and 7-speed blocks were introduced.
Hollowtech	These are cranks that are pressure die-cast as tubes open at the pedal end and forged closed before being threaded for the pedals. Previous to this hollow cranks tended to be tubes with a solid part welded to each end to take the pedals and the bottom bracket.
Hollowtech II	This was the next iteration after Hollowtech cranks. For this system, the spindle was fused to the drive side crank arm and the non-drive side crank arm fitted on the splined spindle using pinch bolts. The bottom bracket bearings sat outside the bottom bracket in the frame, allowing the spindle to be a larger diameter, making it stiffer and lighter. The bearing reliability of this system remains quite variable compared to previous Shimano cartridge bottom bracket bearings as Hollowtech II bearing alignment is at the mercy of the alignment of the bottom bracket threads and the facing of the shell rather than the factory set by Shimano in the case of the cartridge BBs.
Hyperglide (HG)	Shimano 8-speed cassette showing the Hyperglide teeth profiles. Cutaways on the rear gear sprockets (called the cassette if it slides onto a freehub body) allow smoother downshifting (shifting from a small sprocket to a bigger one) as the cutaways allow the chain to roll from one sprocket to another without lifting as far off the sprocket teeth. This allows a certain amount of gear shifting under power, though this remains hard on the drivetrain.
Interactive Glide (IG)	Gears feature "pick-up teeth" and specially shaped tooth profiles for smoother and faster shifting.
Metric chain	Shimano designed chains with a 10 mm pitch instead of the conventional half inch pitch as well as sprockets and chainrings for use with this metric chain; however this did not catch on. For a time 10 mm pitch chains, sprockets, and chainrings were used for motor-paced racing, to reduce the size and weight of the transmission system.
Shimano Nexus	Shimano's family of internally geared hubs. Available in 3-, 7- and 8-speed with or without a coaster brake. The Nexus hubs are comparable in range to a full 16–20-speed system.
Servo Wave	Introduced in the mid-1990s, this system allowed brake levers to pull more brake cable at the start of the lever stroke than at the end. This improved separation between the brake blocks and the rim to accommodate for mud and lack of trueness in the wheels, while still delivering the same braking power like traditional systems. This was implemented initially by mounting the brake cable on a roller that moves towards the lever pivot in a slot in the lever blade as the lever is pulled. A second design pulled the brake cable downwards towards a cam near to the brake lever pivot instead. Servo Wave appeared for the first time on a hydraulic disk brake lever on the 2008 Shimano XT groupset.
Shimano Linear Response (SLR)	Shimano 600 Tricolor brake caliper (Shimano Ultegra 6400) Integration of a return spring into the brake lever, pushing the brake cable back when the lever is released. The idea behind this was that the return spring in the actual brake could be designed to be weaker, thus giving an overall feeling of easier operation.
Shimano Pedaling Dynamics (SPD)	SPD clipless pedal PD-M520 The SPD pedal was released by Shimano in 1990 and forms one part of a clipless bicycle shoe/pedal system. While not the first, its innovation was its small cleat which fitted into a recess in the sole of a shoe designed for SPD use. The recess allowed an SPD-equipped shoe to be used for relatively comfortable short walks, whereas previous systems tended to have a large protruding cleat which prevented this. Clipless pedals use a system of cleat retention which resembles that of downhill skis, allowing for rapid shoe release, ergo clipless pedals are deemed safer than the older styles of pedal/shoe integration that used toe straps.
Shimano Total Integration (STI)	The marketing term for the integration of shifting into the brake levers for road bikes, enabling the rider to shift without taking the hands off the brake levers. This made it possible to shift during uphill passages that require getting out of the saddle and added general convenience for the rider. Although the first generation of STI was unable to downshift multiple cogs which was not a problem in downtube shifters. Shimano 105 9-speed STI levers. Shimano 105 1055SC 7-speed rear derailleur Shimano 105 1055SC downtube shifters
STePS	SHIMANO STePS DU-E6100 (Shimano Total Electric Power System), is Shimano's range of electric bike (or e-bike) components. It's a pedal-assist system, which means the power is only applied when you're pedaling. It's designed to make e-bikes feel and handle more like ‘normal’ bikes.

=== Results ===
Alexi Grewal used a bicycle equipped with Shimano DynaDrive chainset and pedals (the remainder of the components on his bicycle were primarily Suntour and DiaCompe) to win the 1984 Olympic road race in Los Angeles. In the 1988 Giro d'Italia, Andrew Hampsten rode Shimano to its first Grand Tour victory. In 2002, world championships in both the road and time trial disciplines were won on Shimano equipment. Alberto Contador's 2007 victory in the Tour de France on a Shimano-equipped bicycle represents the first official General Classification victory in that race by a rider using Shimano components (Lance Armstrong originally won the TDF with Shimano in 1999 but was later disqualified due to drug use).

=== VIA ===
"VIA" ("Vehicle Inspection Association") is stamped on all Shimano parts. It is an official approval stamp used to certify parts of Japanese vehicles – including bicycles. This mark signifies compliance with certain quality standards.

== Fishing ==
Shimano offers a range of fishing tackle including reels, rods, lines, lures, as well as various fishing accessories, apparels and electronics. Among them, their spinning reels are their top-selling product series globally. Top spinning reels of this brand (Stella SW C) cost from $950-$1350.

In 1997, Shimano America Corporation (now Shimano North America Holding, Inc.) acquired Woodland, Washington based G.Loomis—a noted fishing rod manufacturer, initially founded in 1982.

== Rowing ==
Shimano also offers a range of foot stretcher systems for rowing called SRD (Shimano Rowing Dynamics). The system consists of individualised rowing shoes and a foot stretcher to affix the shoes to.

== Manufacturing ==
Shimano has 13,000 employees (2017). Shimano runs fabrications in Australia, China, Germany, India, Indonesia, Japan, Malaysia, Mexico, the Philippines, Singapore, Taiwan, Thailand, the United Kingdom, the United States, and Vietnam.

== Partnerships ==
Shimano is a founding member of the Global Alliance for EcoMobility, an international partnership that works to promote EcoMobility and thus reduce citizens’ dependency on private motorized vehicles worldwide. The EcoMobility Alliance was founded by a group of leading global organizations on the occasion of the Climate Change Conference in Bali in December 2007.

== Sponsorships ==
Shimano sponsors a wide range of organisations, cycling events and athletes. Some notable sponsees include:

- Tour de France, the most prestigious bicycle race in the world.
- Ironman Triathlon, long-distance triathlon races, widely considered one of the most difficult one-day sporting events in the world.
- Jonas Deichmann, a German adventurer, extreme athlete and multiple world record holder.
- Henrique Avancini, one of world’s best mountain bike racers.
- USRowing, the national governing body for the sport of Rowing in the United States.
- Ineos Grenadiers, a British professional cycling team.

== See also ==
- Comparison of hub gears
- Daiwa
