= Polchlopek =

Polchlopek (Półchłopek in Polish) is a surname. Notable people with the surname include:

- Edmond Polchlopek (1934–2004), French road racing cyclist and bicycle designer
- Mike Polchlopek (born 1965), American wrestler
