= Honda Racing Corporation =

Motorsport subsidiary of Honda

- Type: Subsidiary
- Industry: Automotive
- Genre: Motorsport
- Founded: September 1, 1982; 43 years ago
- Headquarters: 2-wheel centre: Asaka, Saitama, Japan; 4-wheel centre: Sakura, Tochigi, Japan
- Area served: Worldwide
- Key people: Koji Watanabe (President); Takuma Sato (Executive Advisor)
- Products: High-performance auto parts
- Services: Research and development
- Parent: Honda
- Website: honda.racing

Honda Racing Corporation (HRC), also known as Honda Racing, is a motorsport subsidiary of the Honda Motor Company formed in 1982. From its founding, the company was initially solely responsible for Honda's motorcycle racing activities, before the brand's automobile racing activities were integrated into HRC's scope of work on 1 April 2022.

The company combines participation in motorcycle and automobile races throughout the world with the development of racing machines. In addition to promoting the Honda brand and entertaining fans, its racing activities provide a platform for training engineers and contribute to the development of technologies used in Honda products. HRC activities also include sales of racing vehicles, support for customer and satellite teams, and driver/rider education programmes.

HRC has been competing in Grand Prix motorcycle racing since the company's inception, winning over 20 constructors' titles in the premier class. It has also been involved in Formula One as a power unit manufacturer since 2022; in 2023, the Honda RBPTH001 unit claimed 21 wins in 22 races. In February 2023, the FIA confirmed that Honda, through HRC, would be a power unit manufacturer for the new regulations in 2026.

== History ==
=== Exclusively involved in motorcycle racing (1982–2022) ===
Initially, Honda's racing efforts were run from within the company. In 1973, the Racing Service Center (RSC) was created as a separate company involved in motorcycle racing. RSC was involved in the development and supply of racing bikes for domestic competitions, and in 1976 it began participating in the European endurance championship, which later became the FIM Endurance World Championship in 1980. In 1979, Honda returned to Grand Prix motorcycle racing with the NR500 bike developed by the NR block development team within Honda R&D. On 1 September 1982, the NR block and RSC were merged to form Honda Racing Corporation (HRC), which would be responsible for all of Honda's motorcycle racing programmes.

The addition of the NR block's pure racing machine development structure to the RSC's organisational structure, which had supported the activities of privateers by developing production-based works machines and supplying racing parts, created an efficient structure as a specialist company involved in the entire range of motorcycle racing activities from the top to the bottom. At the same time, the base for racing activities in Europe, which had its origins in the Isle of Man TT race in 1959, was moved from the island nation of Great Britain to mainland Europe in Belgium for greater convenience. Shoichiro Irimajiri, who was the general manager of the NR block, was appointed as the first president. By making HRC a separate company specialising in racing, the company was able to achieve continuous racing activities that were less dependent on the performance of the head office.

In an unusual move, the company developed and manufactured the RN-01, a dedicated mountain bike for downhill racing, and participated in competitions including the JCF Mountain Bike Japan Series and UCI Mountain Bike World Cup between 2003 and 2007. The material processing technology acquired during this time was utilised in the development of the seamless transmission for motorcycles, which was first used in the RC212V.

=== Expansion into automobile racing (2022–present) ===
On 1 April 2022, Honda's automobile racing activities were integrated into HRC's scope of work. As part of the integration, Honda's four-wheel motorsport development base HRD Sakura (a division of Honda R&D) was transferred to HRC and renamed HRC Sakura. The motorcycle division will remain based in Asaka, Saitama, while HRC Sakura (based in Sakura, Tochigi) will act as the automobile division. In line with this, HRC will also be responsible for Honda's Formula One operations.

On 24 May 2023, Honda announced that it would make a full-scale return to Formula One from 2026 and supply works power units to the Aston Martin team; HRC will be responsible for the development of F1 power units and for race entry and management on the Honda side.

In December 2023, Honda's North American motorsport subsidiary, Honda Performance Development (HPD), became Honda Racing Corporation USA (HRC US). With this change, the two independent motorsport subsidiaries will work together as one global HRC entity.

In February 2024, a local subsidiary, HRC UK, was established in the United Kingdom as the European base for the return to F1 from 2026 onwards.

== Racing activities ==
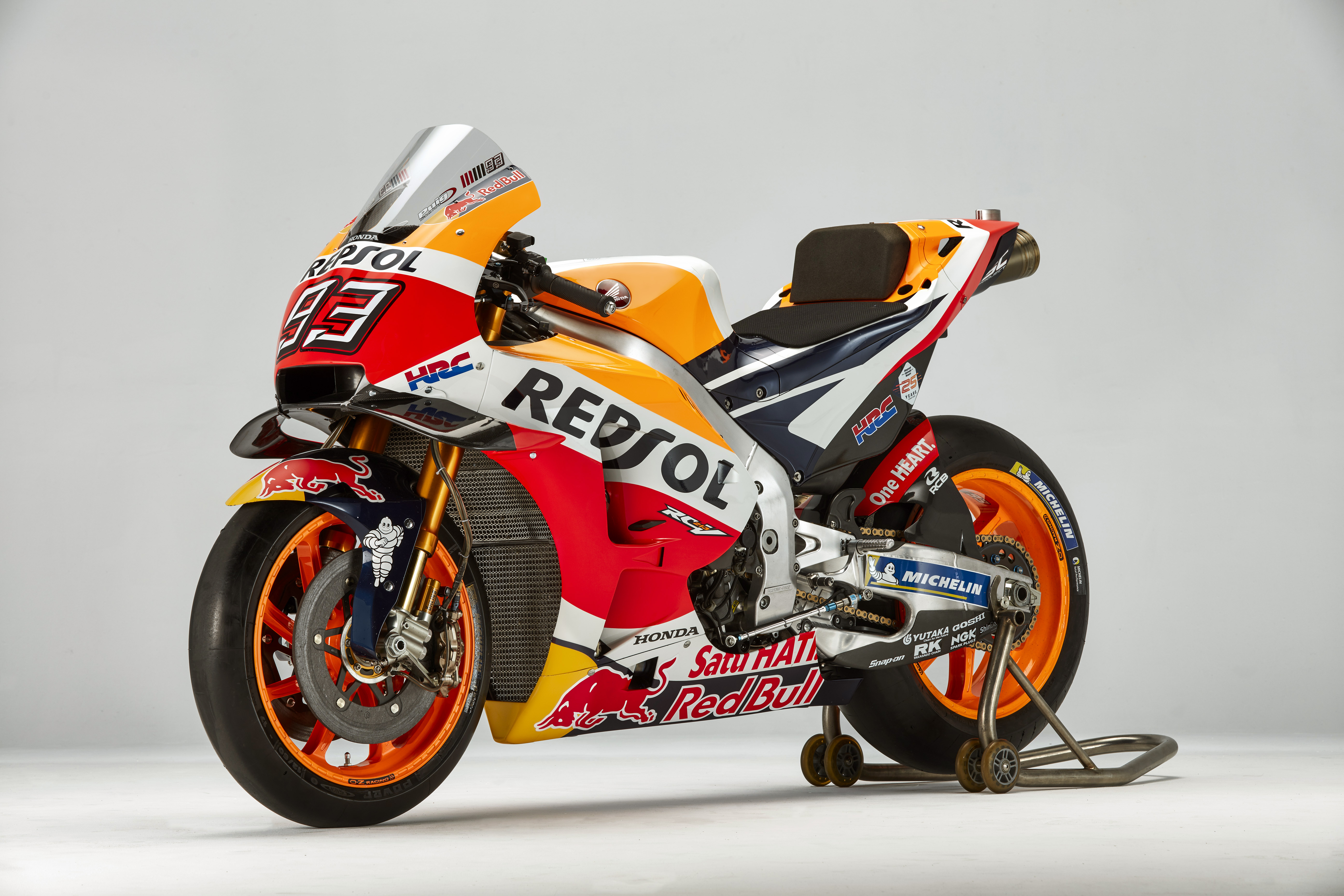
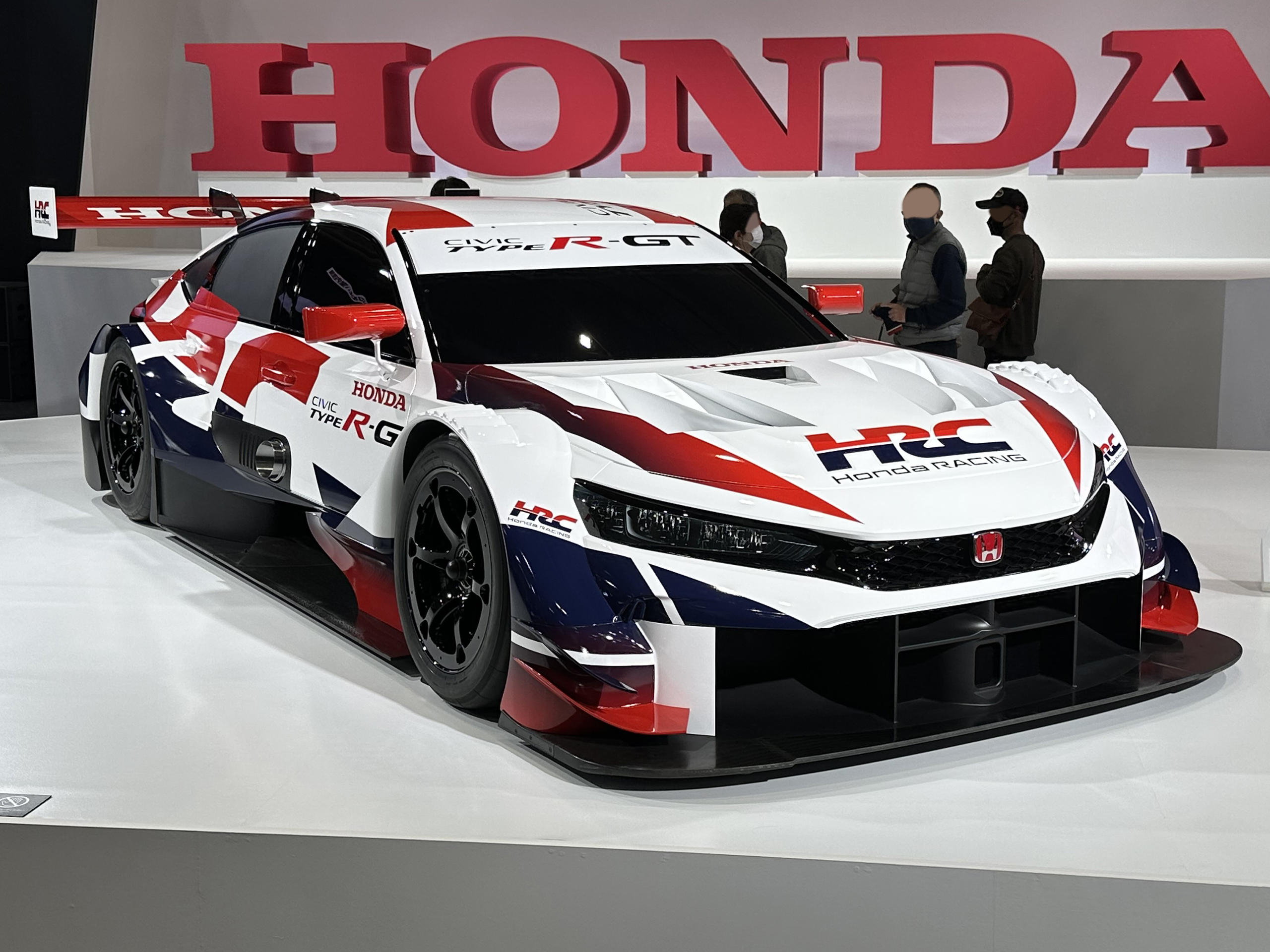
HRC is involved in both motorcycle and automobile racing.

=== Motorcycle racing ===
- Grand Prix motorcycle racing (MotoGP)

HRC is currently competing in the premier class of MotoGP as Honda HRC Castrol. It also supplied engines to the Moto2 class as a designated supplier until 2018. In addition, it supplies works-specification vehicles to Honda customer teams in the Moto3 class.

- Superbike World Championship (SBK)

HRC competed as a works team in the Superbike World Championship under the Castrol Honda banner until the end of 2002. After that, other teams continued racing with Honda bikes. In 2019, the works backing returned for the first time in 17 years, with full support for the Moriwaki Althea Honda Team, a joint team of Moriwaki Engineering and Italy's Althea Racing. It was also announced that in 2020, HRC itself will organise and enter a works team for the first time in 18 years.

- All Japan Road Race Championship (JRR)

From 2007, HRC resumed activities in the JSB1000 class of the All Japan Road Race Championship, which continued until 2019, and from 2020 onwards it will concentrate on kit development for Honda teams. The team competed in the Superbike (SB) class until 2002 and in GP250 until 1999, with the exception of 1996.

- Suzuka 8 Hours Endurance Road Race

From 2018, the HRC resumed its activities as a works team in the Suzuka 8 Hours for the first time in 10 years, winning the event in 2022. Eight of Honda's 10 consecutive victories in the event, which lasted from 1997 to 2006, were by HRC; from 1998 to 2006, the main sponsor was a tobacco brand (Lucky Strike in 1998 and 1999, Cabin in 2000–2002 and Seven Star in 2003–2006). The company continued to provide machines and support to private teams.

- Motocross World Championship (MXGP)

Honda won its first title in the 500cc class of the Motocross World Championship in 1979. Since then, the manufacturer has won 39 riders' titles and is still competing.

- AMA Motocross (AMX)/AMA Supercross (SX)/Supermotocross (SMX)

Honda won its first title in the 250cc class of AMA Motocross in 1973 when it debuted in the motocross market with the two-stroke engine CR250M. It has continued to compete in AMA Motocross ever since.

- All Japan Motocross Championship (JMX)

Team HRC ceased to compete as a works team in the All Japan Motocross Championship from 2020, but it will continue to support privateers.

- Trial World Championship (TrialGP)

HRC is currently competing in the Trial World Championship. It has a technical alliance with Spanish motorcycle manufacturer Montesa, with the works team entry named Repsol Montesa HRC.

- Dakar Rally/World Rally-Raid Championship (W2RC)

At the request of Honda France, which was competing in the Dakar Rally, the team was provided with a modified XR500R machine from 1982. Cyril Neveu won the Dakar Rally that year. In 1986, the NXR750, a prototype machine with a liquid-cooled V-twin engine, was launched and won the rally four times in a row until 1989. In 1995, the team sent in a 400cc single-cylinder EXP-2 as an experimental machine with a two-stroke engine, which finished fifth overall and won the event in the under-500cc class. The company continued to provide support to riders on Honda vehicles, but in 2013 it returned as a works team for the first time in 24 years with the CRF450 Rally, which won the Cross-Country Rallies World Championship that year. In 2020, its eighth year back in the Dakar, HRC won the event overall for the first time in 31 years, and it repeated the feat the following year in 2021. In the World Rally-Raid Championship, which was created in 2022, HRC won the manufacturers' title in 2022, 2023 and 2024.

- Baja 1000

Originating as a project of Honda's North American subsidiary, the Baja 1000 desert race has been dominated by Honda since the late 1990s (in part due to the lack of rival works bikes), winning 17 consecutive events between 1997 and 2013.

=== Automobile racing ===
- Formula One (F1)

HRC's involvement in Formula One began in 2022, when it started supplying power units to Red Bull Racing and AlphaTauri through Red Bull Powertrains (RBPT). The power units were previously developed and manufactured by the Honda Motor Company itself. In 2022, they were badged as RBPT units, and from 2023 they will be known as Honda RBPT units. HRC will continue to manufacture, assemble and supply the current power units until the end of 2025. From 2026, HRC will enter into a works contract with the Aston Martin F1 team to supply power units; HRC will be responsible for the development of the F1 power units and for race entry and management on the Honda side.

- Super Formula

HRC has participated in Super Formula, the premier category of open-wheel racing in Japan, since 2022, when it took over the engine programme previously carried out by HRD Sakura. The project includes development and supply of 2.0-litre turbocharged inline-4 engines built to Nippon Race Engine (NRE) regulations. With the HR-417E engine, Honda's Tomoki Nojiri and Team Mugen claimed the championship titles in HRC's first season in 2022.

- Super GT

Honda's GT500 class Super GT project was transferred from HRD Sakura to HRC in 2022. The programme includes aerodynamic and chassis development in addition to the engine, which is shared with Super Formula. The 2022 and 2023 seasons saw HRC campaign the NSX-GT, which in those years received revised front bodywork based on the road-going Type S model. In 2024, HRC introduced the Civic Type R-GT, which became the first four-door GT500 vehicle as well as the first to be based on a front-wheel-drive model, although the GT500 model is rear-wheel-drive. In 2026, the Civic will be replaced by the Prelude-GT.

- GT3 customer racing

In 2022, HRC took over the NSX GT3 project and continued to offer the car to customer racing teams. The car received an Evo22 upgrade that year, having already been used in various GT3 competitions since 2017. Customer support for the car was handled by Mugen (M-TEC) in Japan, HRC US in North America, and JAS Motorsport in Europe and the rest of the world. HRC ended its factory support for the programme after 2024, with the car having claimed several accolades, including titles in the IMSA SportsCar Championship, Super GT, GT World Challenge America and Le Mans Cup, as well as victory at Petit Le Mans.

- TCR customer racing

HRC assumed control of Honda's involvement in the customer-based TCR touring car category in 2022, with JAS Motorsport responsible for the programme. The FK7 Civic Type R TCR continued to be available for customers in 2022, while a new FL5 Civic Type R TCR was introduced in 2023 with improvements in areas including aerodynamics, suspension, ergonomics, and weight. By August 2024, the Civic TCR range had surpassed 500 wins globally and won over 90 titles.

- Super Taikyu

In 2023, Team HRC began participating in the experimental ST-Q class of the Super Taikyu Series with a carbon-neutral fuel compatible FL5 Civic Type R CNF-R. The team aims to learn about carbon-neutral fuel and develop cars and parts for customers. Several other teams in the series also run production-based Honda vehicles.

- North American activities (via HRC US)

The HRC brand has also been involved in multiple series in North America since Honda Performance Development became Honda Racing Corporation USA for 2024. HRC US competes in the IndyCar Series as an engine manufacturer, producing 2.2-litre twin-turbocharged V6 engines with hybrid units for several teams. They also participate in the premier GTP class of the IMSA SportsCar Championship with the Acura ARX-06 prototype built to LMDh specifications. They are also involved in off-road racing with the Baja Ridgeline trophy truck, which competes in events such as the Baja 1000.

=== Non-motorsport activities ===
HRC developed the Honda RN-01 G-cross mountain bike for downhill racing events. The RN-01 competed in events such as the UCI Mountain Bike World Cup in the mid-2000s, winning that competition in the downhill category in 2005 with Greg Minnaar. In 2023, HRC began holding its esports competition, known as Honda Racing eMS; the event takes place in Gran Turismo 7.

== Research and development ==
For the development of special racing motorcycles and parts Honda created a separate company in 1970 called Racing Service Center Corporation later renamed Honda Racing Corporation, which is also focused on research and development activities. It combines racing around the world with the development of advanced racing cars. HRC's R&D activities include research to create new technologies, materials, designs and developments to translate these advances into commercial products.

HRC serves as a research platform for Honda’s carbon neutrality initiatives, specifically in the development of sustainable propulsion. The company utilizes the Super Taikyu Series in Japan to test carbon-neutral fuels (CNF) through the Civic Type R CNF-R project. In 2024, HRC's research contributed to the commencement of mass production for new fuel cell systems in Ohio, a joint venture with General Motors intended for heavy-duty trucking and stationary power stations. These technical applications also extend to aerospace; in 2025, a HondaJet completed a test flight using a 100% blend of sustainable aviation fuel (SAF). HRC is involved in a joint project with Astrobotic Technology to develop power solutions for lunar surface missions, utilizing technologies derived from its fuel cell research.

== User support ==
HRC has HRC Service Shops at 23 locations in Japan and seven sites overseas.

== See also ==
- Honda racing motorcycles
- Honda RC211V
- Honda RC212V
- Honda RC213V
- Honda RCV1000R
- Honda NR500
- Honda NSR500
- Honda MT125R
- Honda RS125R
- Honda RS250R
- Honda NSF250R
- Honda RC30
- Honda RC45
- Honda RC51
