= Osymetric =

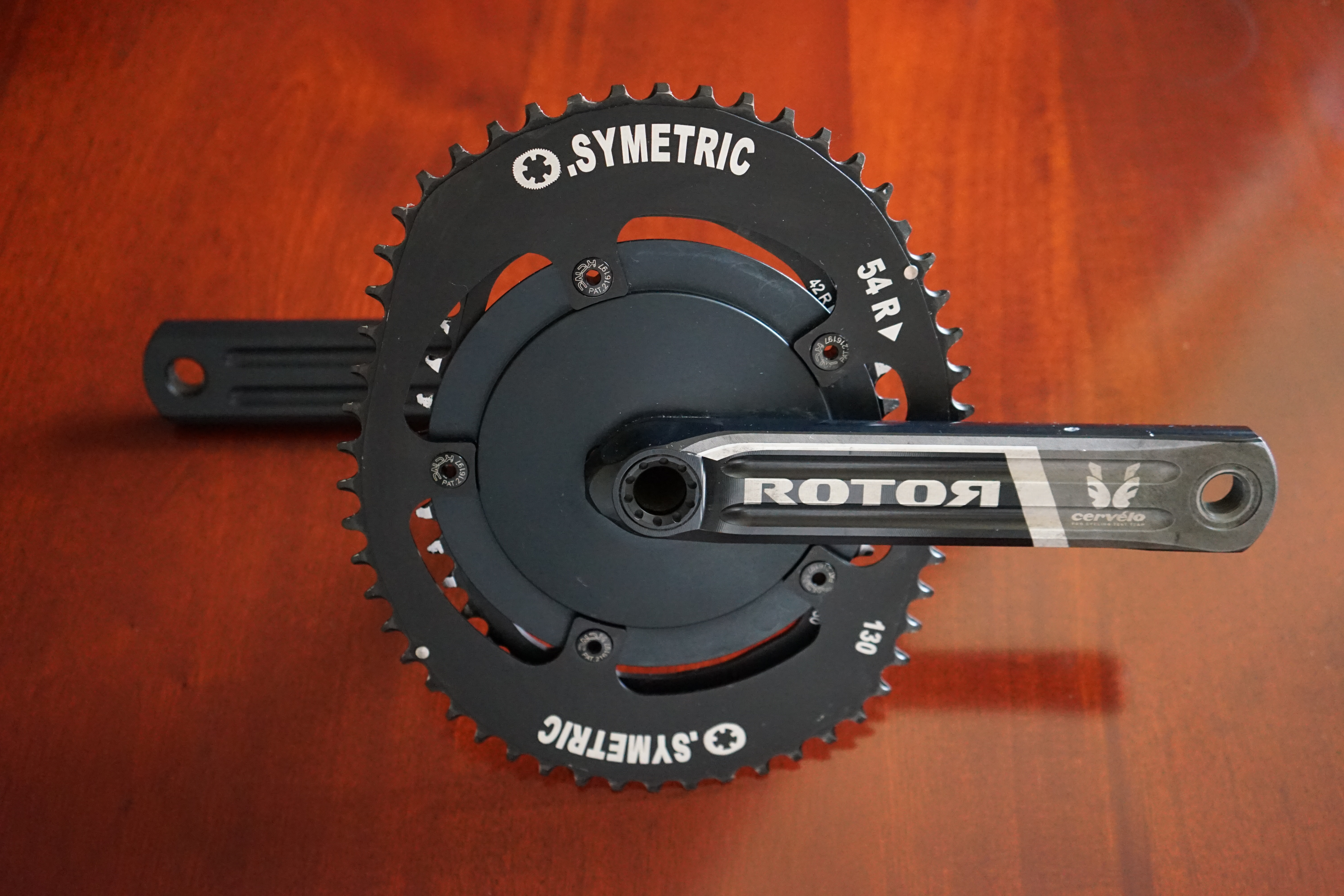
A crankset with a variable angle Rotor / Cervélo crank and Osymetric chain ring

Osymetric is a French make of ovoid bicycle chainring which has a non-circular shape whose angle is tailored to the pedal stroke of the individual cyclist. These were designed by engineer Jean-Louis Talo who claims that this improves cycling performance. Such chainrings were used by professional cyclists Bradley Wiggins and Chris Froome for their Tour de France victories.

== See also ==
- Biopace
