= Gearbox bicycle =

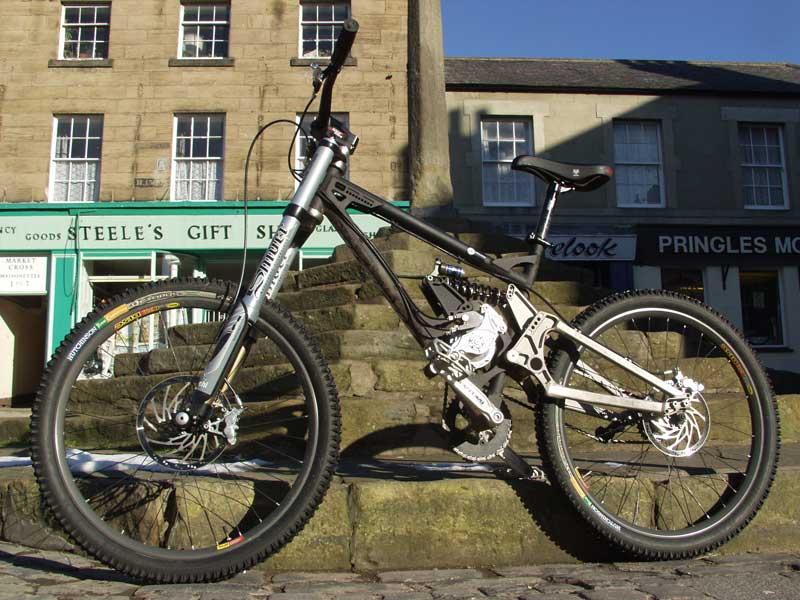
Nicolai gearbox mountain bike

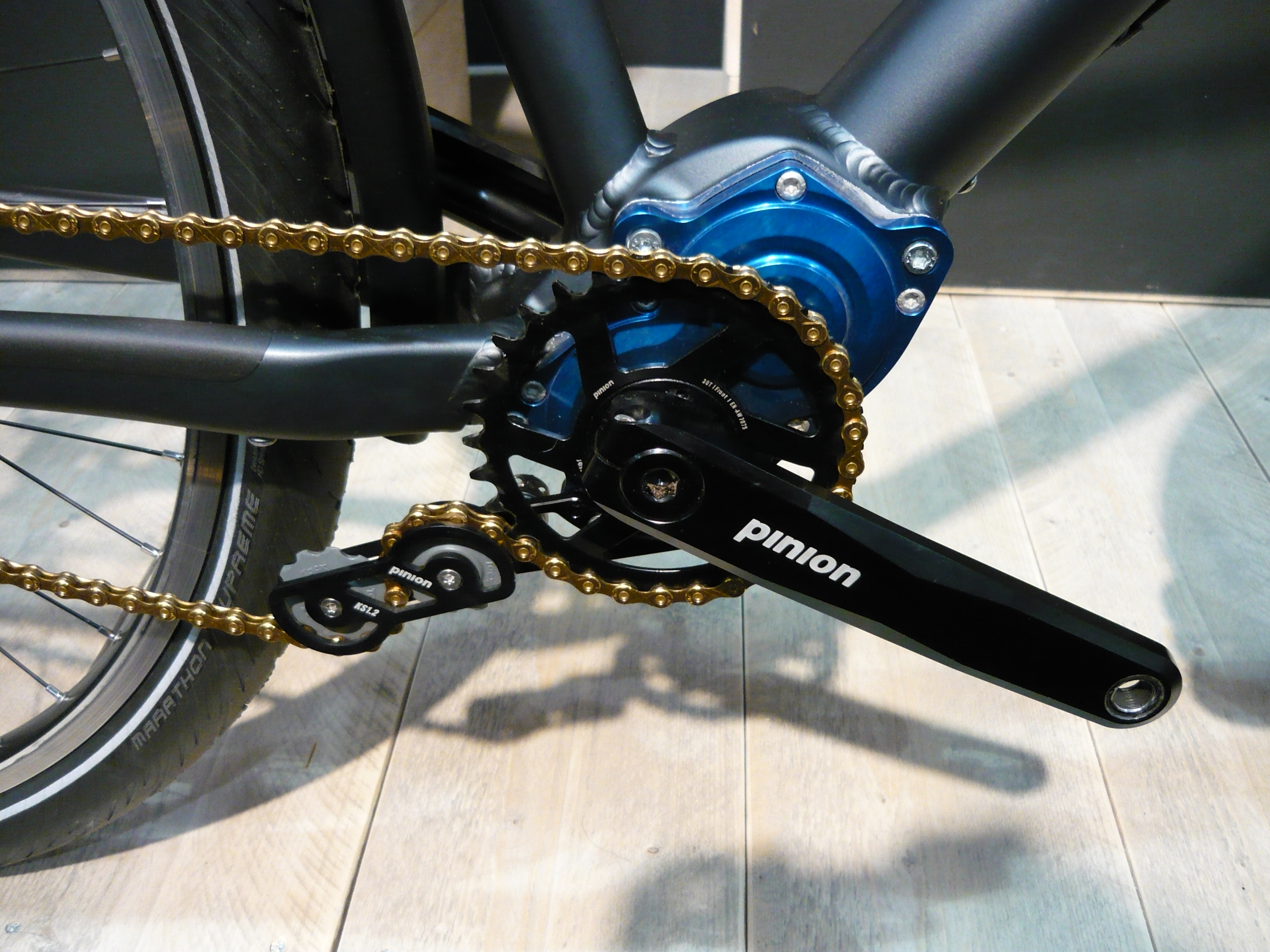
Pinion P1.18 gearbox installed in a bicycle frame

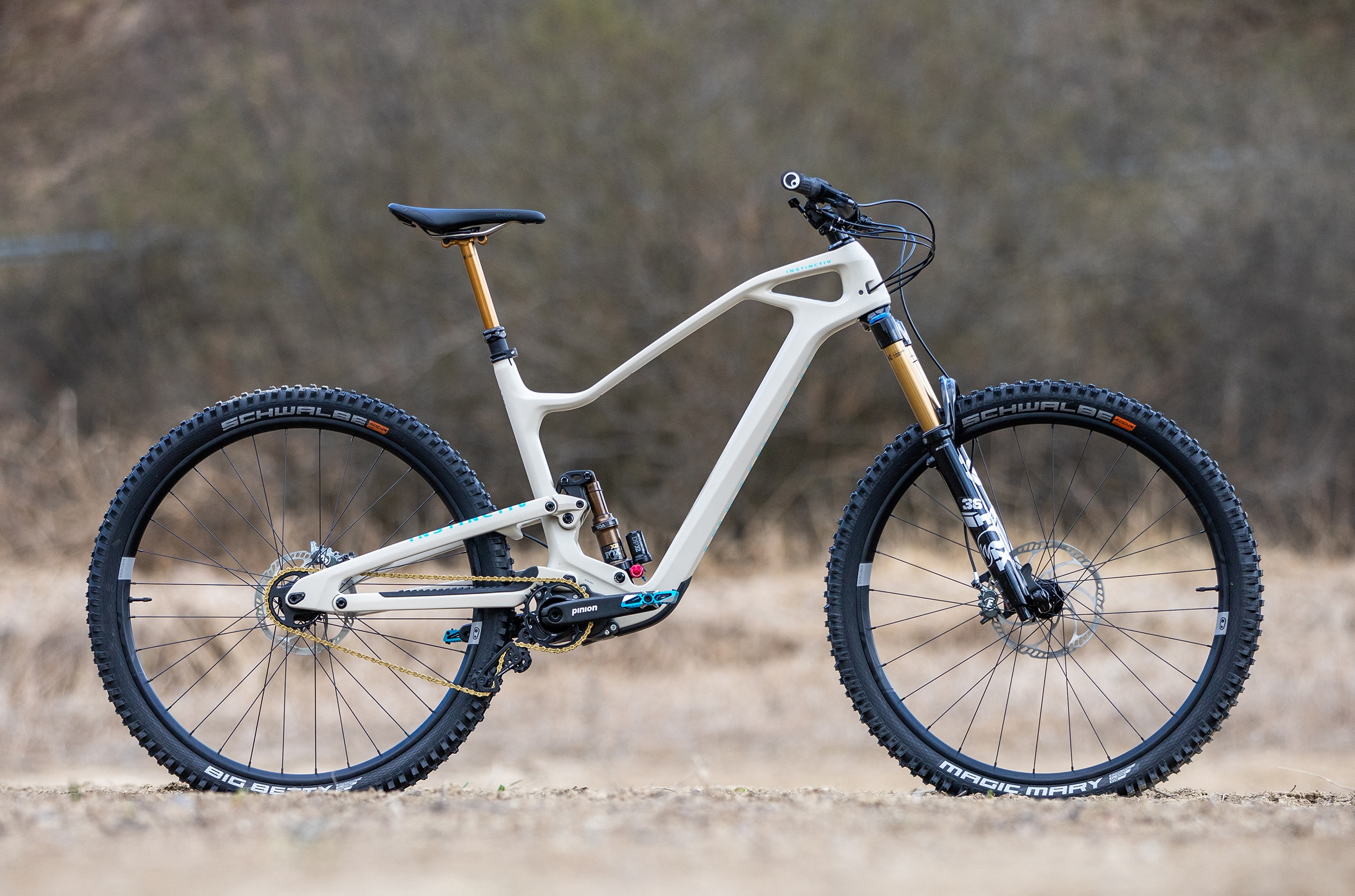
Instinctiv Modern full suspension carbon gearbox mountain bike

A gearbox bicycle is a bicycle that uses a gearbox to convert torque and rotational speed from the power source, usually the rider's legs, to what is desired at the drive wheel. The gearbox is usually incorporated into the frame near the crank, and it may be used in addition to or instead of derailleur gears or a hub gear. Cited advantages include improved shifting performance, protecting the gearing from damage and exposure to dirt and moisture, as with hub gears, plus locating the additional mass between the two wheels and on the frame where it may be suspended, unlike with hub gears.

== History ==
Patents for built-in systems to change gear ratios appeared as early as 1890. Adler offered a three-speed gearbox bicycle in the 1930s. Several attempts to develop gearbox bicycles during the 2000s for downhill racing, such as the Honda RN-01 G-cross, incorporated complete derailleur gear drive trains in an enclosure. Around the same time Schlumpf Innovations and Hammerschmidt offered cranksets with two different gear ratios and just one chainring. Pinion launched their spur-gear system in the 2010s.

== Methods ==
At least three different gearing techniques have been employed.

- Epicyclic gears, as in hub gears.
- Spur gears, as in most automobile transmissions.
- Derailleur gears, as on many bicycles, but fully enclosed.

== See also ==
- Bicycle drivetrain systems

== Gallery ==
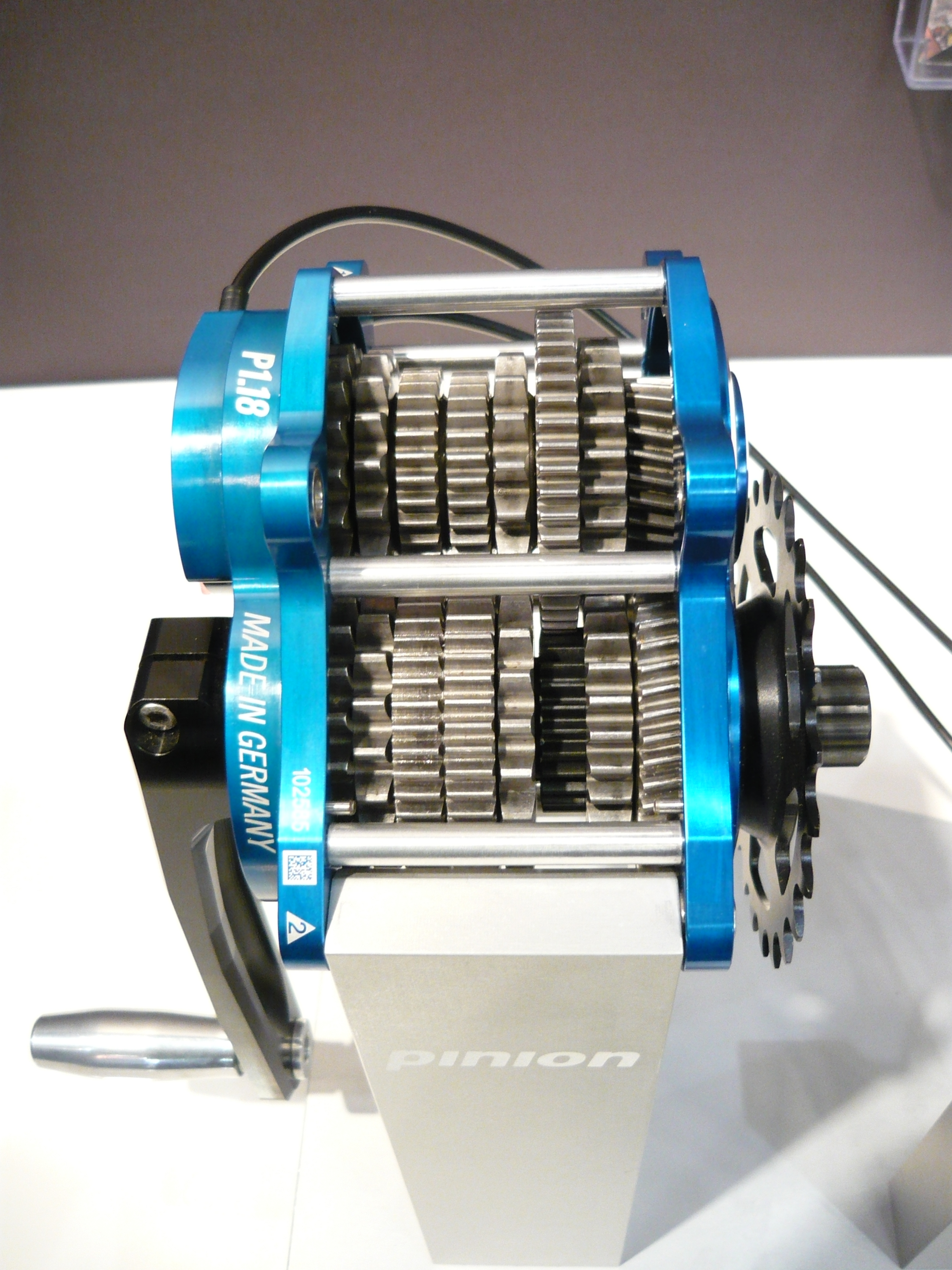
Pinion P1.18 gearbox interior

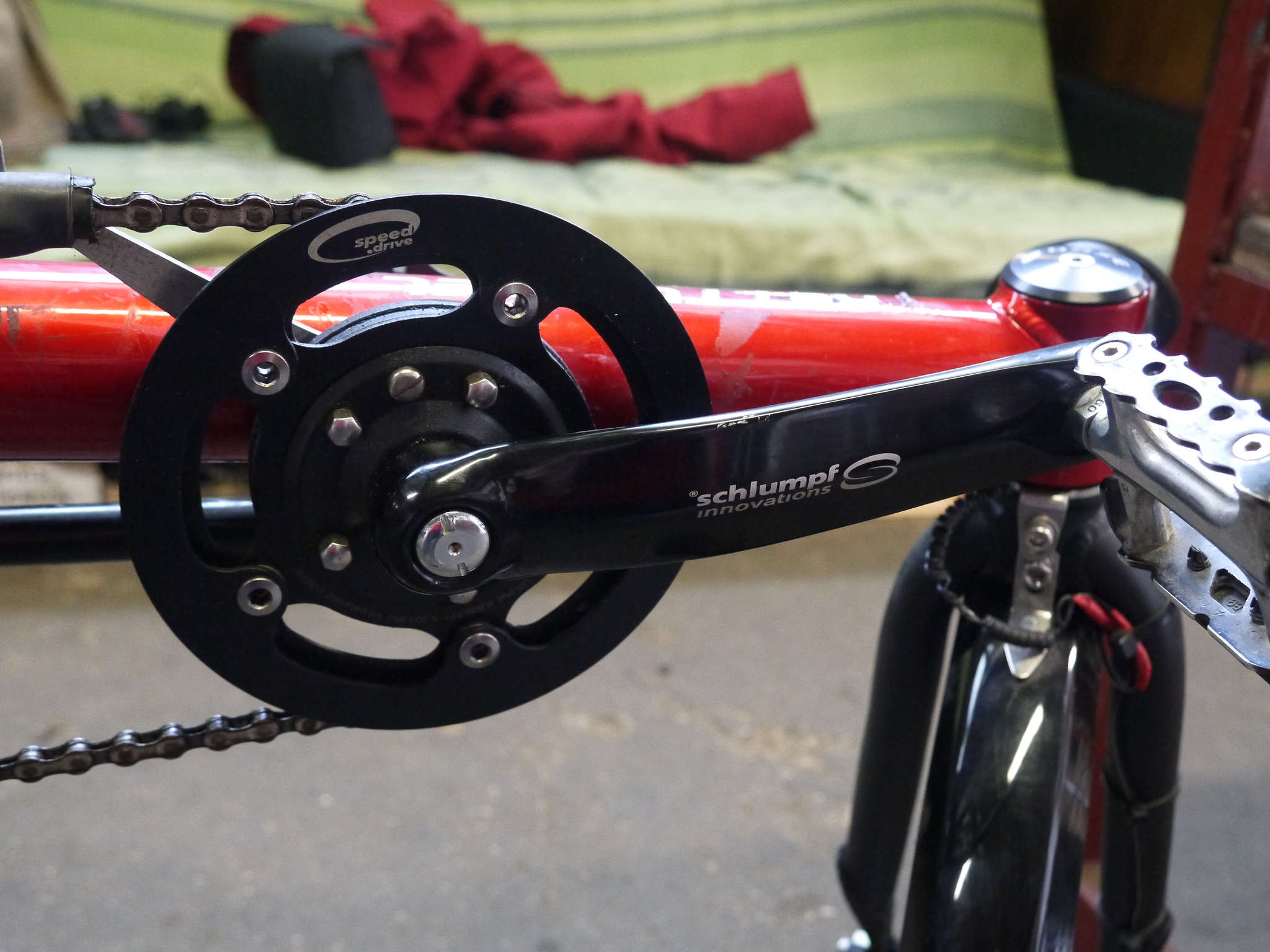
Schlumpf Speed Drive

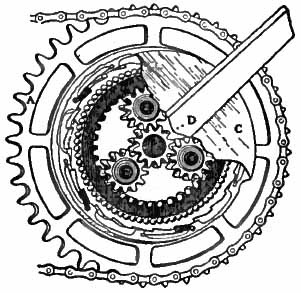
Diagram of the Sunbeam two-speed gear for a bicycle (part of the crank) assembly from the 1911 Encyclopædia Britannica, Vol. 3, p. 916

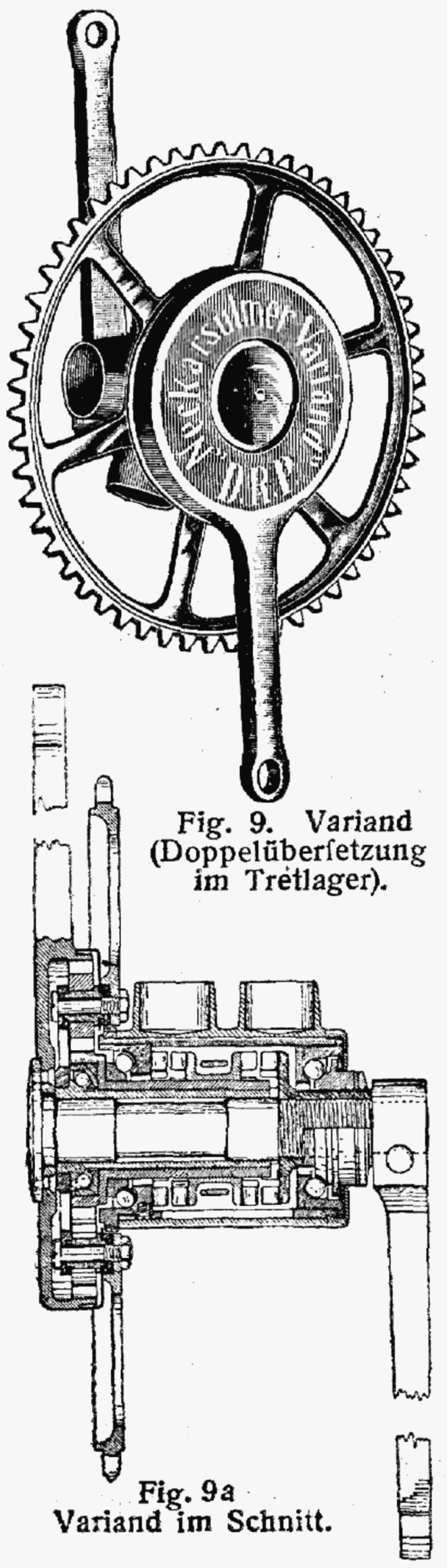
Image from the Lexikon der gesamten Technik (dictionary of technology) from 1904 by Otto Lueger

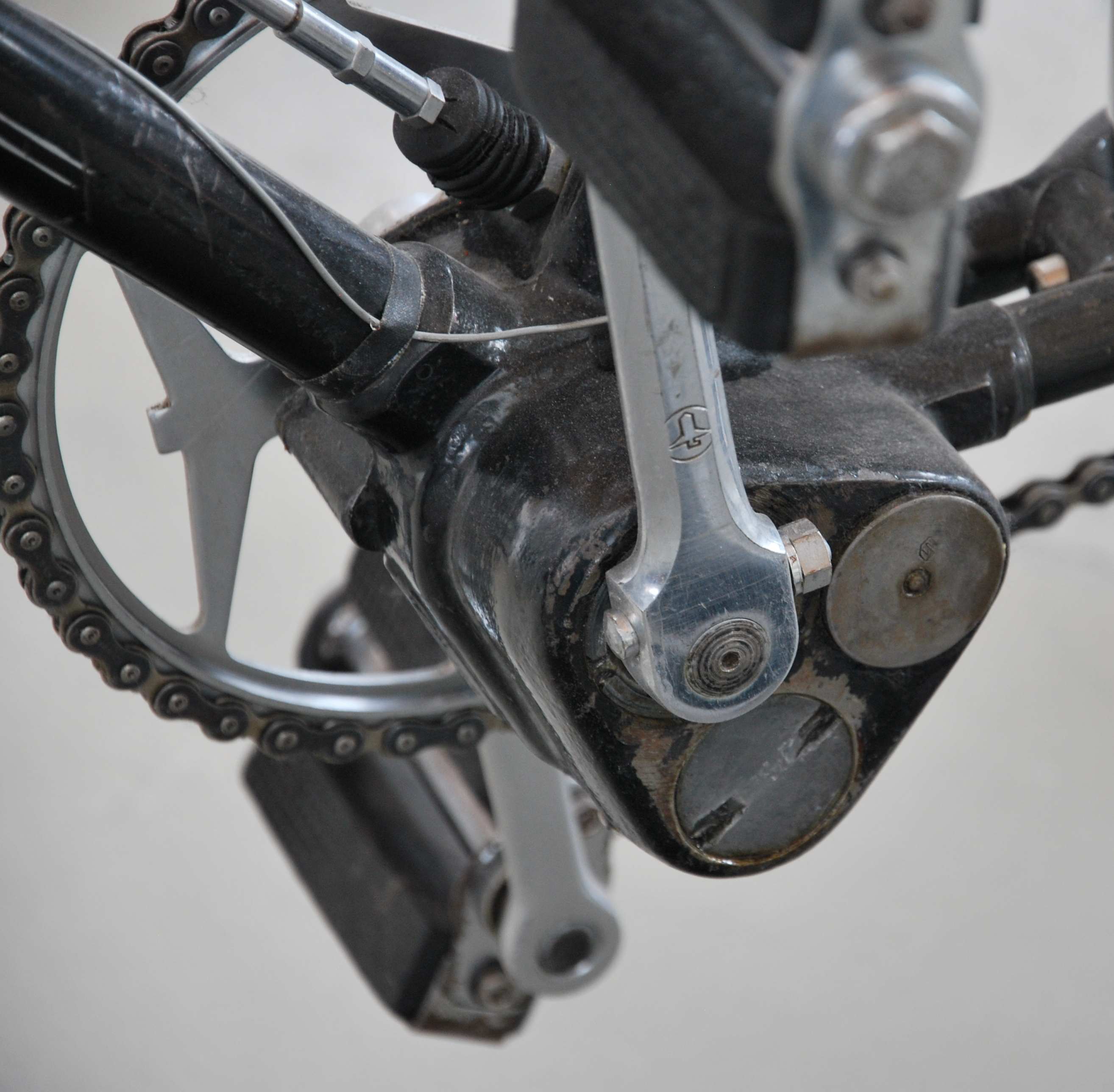
Adler gearbox with 3 gears from 1936

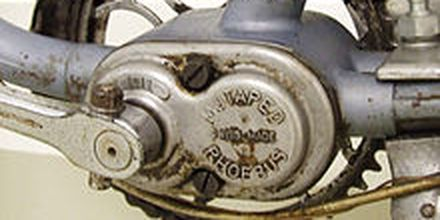
Mutaped gearbox external view

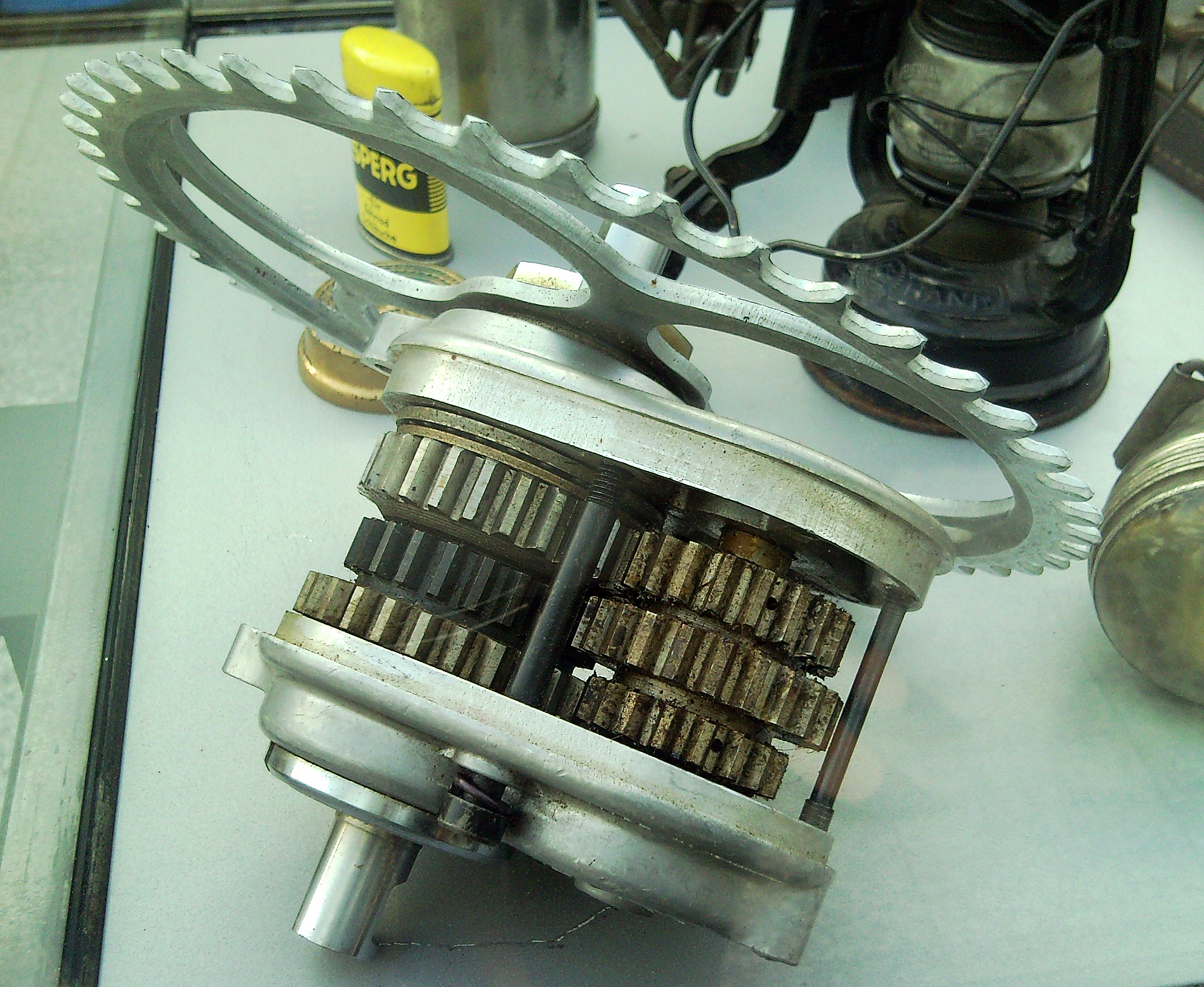
Mutaped gearbox internal view
