= Biopace =

Tradename for a type of bicycle chain ring

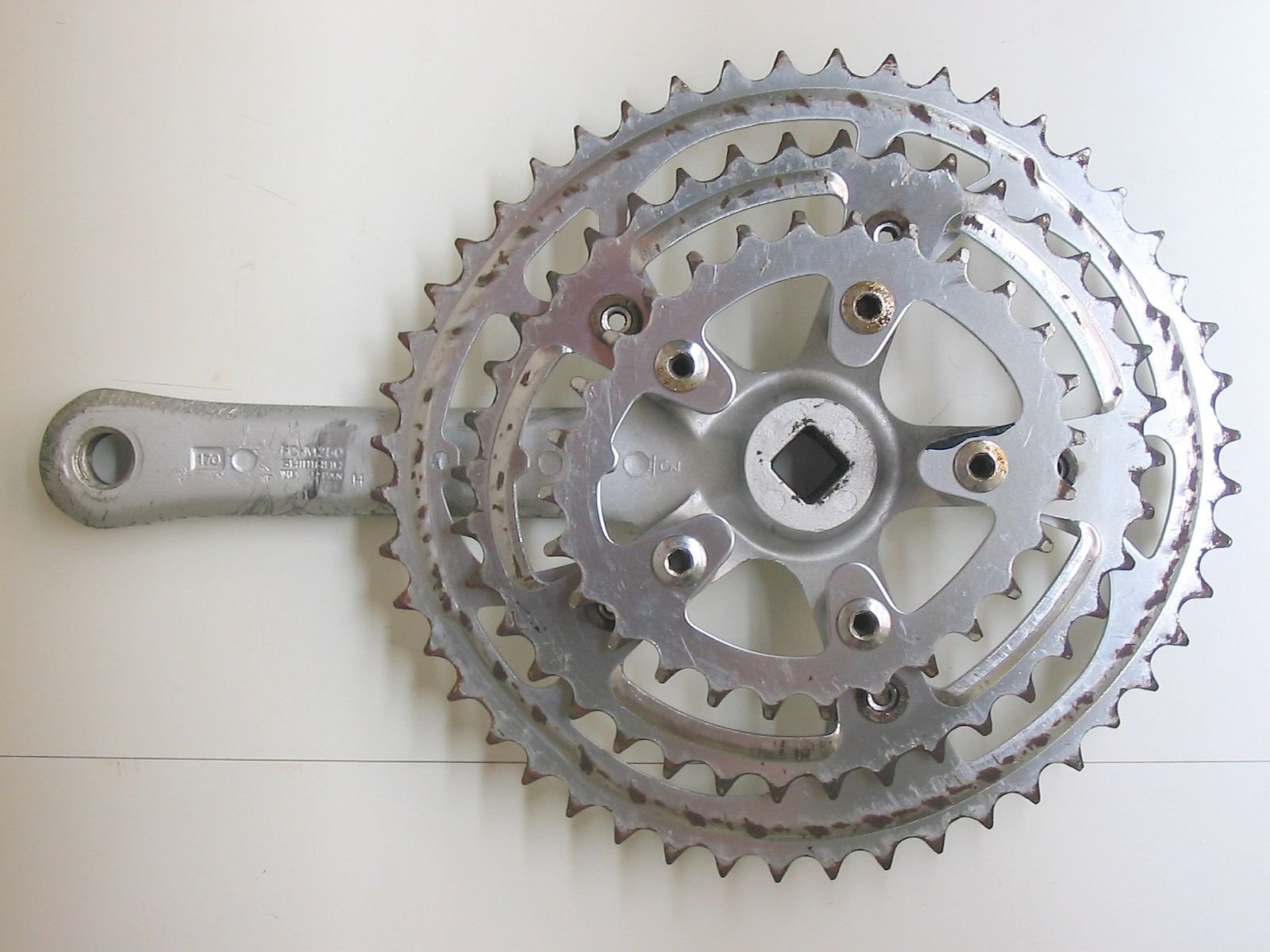
Biopace triple crankset, a non-round crankset

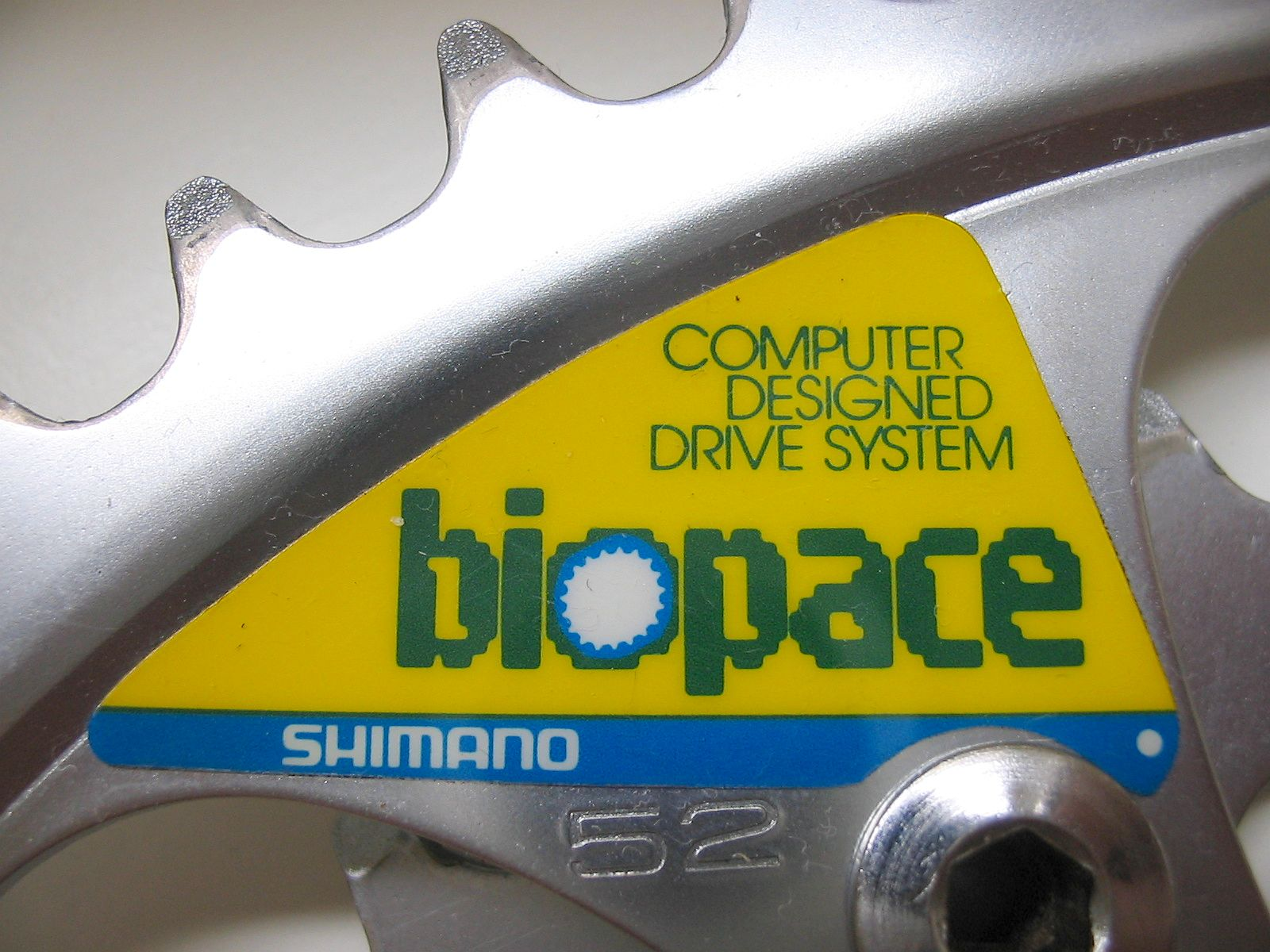
The Biopace logo on a chainring

Biopace is a tradename for a type of ovoid bicycle chain ring manufactured by Shimano from 1983 to 1993 The design was intended to help overcome the "dead zone" where the crank arms are vertical and riders have little mechanical advantage.

Biopace chainrings have a reduced chainring diameter coinciding with the cranks being horizontal. This is supposed to smooth the pedaling action, allowing the rider's feet to carry more momentum through the power stroke, and having it smoothly removed at the bottom of the stroke rather than encouraging riders to push bigger gears and risk knee damage due to higher knee joint loadings.

This is different from the design of other oval style chainrings, which have the smaller effective chainring diameter coincide with the cranks being at the top dead center (TDC) and bottom dead center (BDC), thus making the crank easier for the rider to turn through bottom dead center for constant chain tension. By having the chainring at its peak effective diameter with the cranks level, where the rider has maximum leverage over the crank during the power stroke, these designs are supposed to make better use of the rider's power output.

Some cyclists find the benefits of Biopace worthwhile, including well-respected bike mechanic Sheldon Brown. Some riders may also value a Biopace crankset for its historical accuracy on a vintage bike, for its novelty value, or even retro-cachet.

== See also ==
- Crankset
- Osymetric
