= Crankset =

Bicycle part

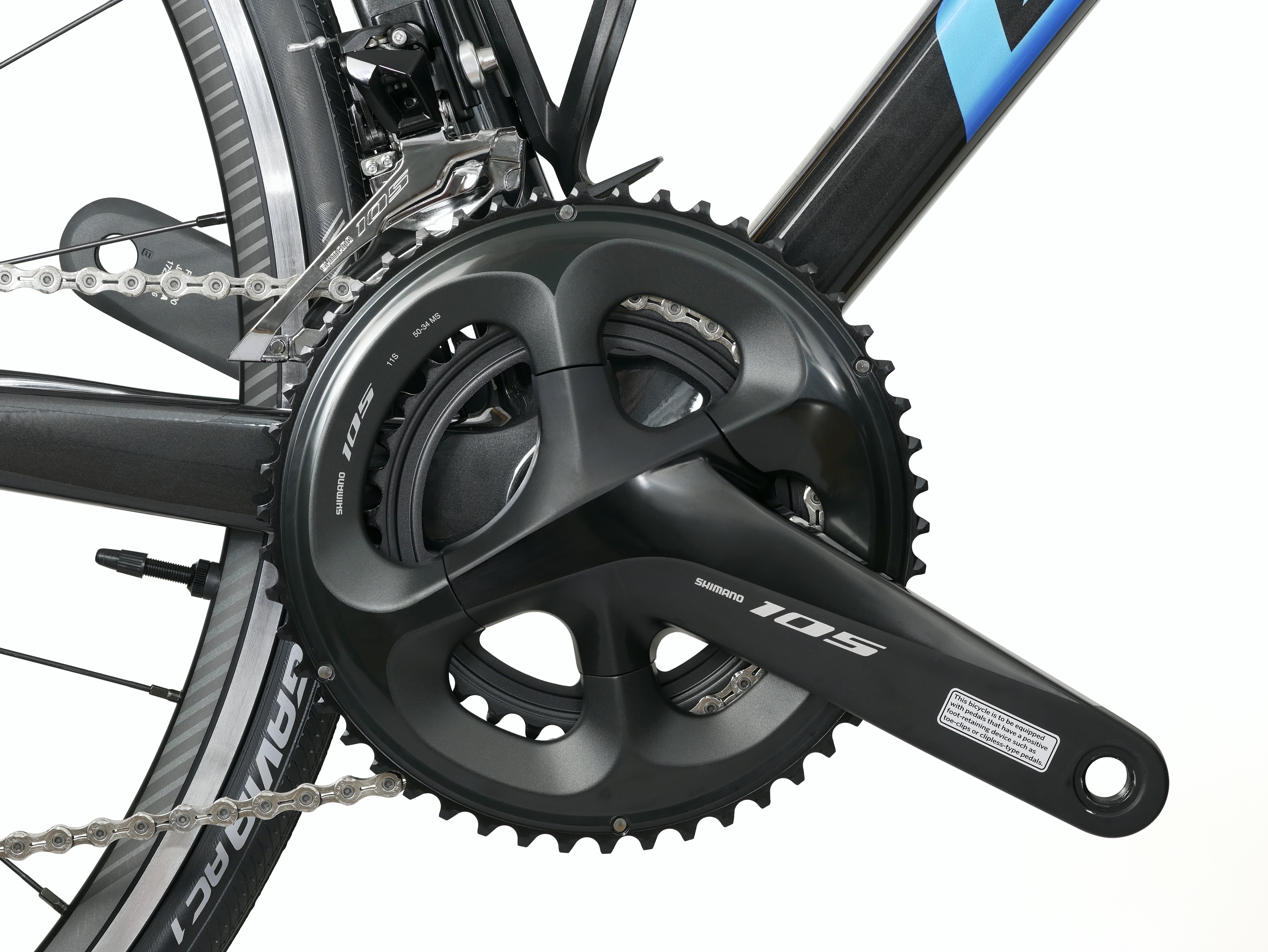
A Shimano 105 crankset with two chainrings on a road bicycle

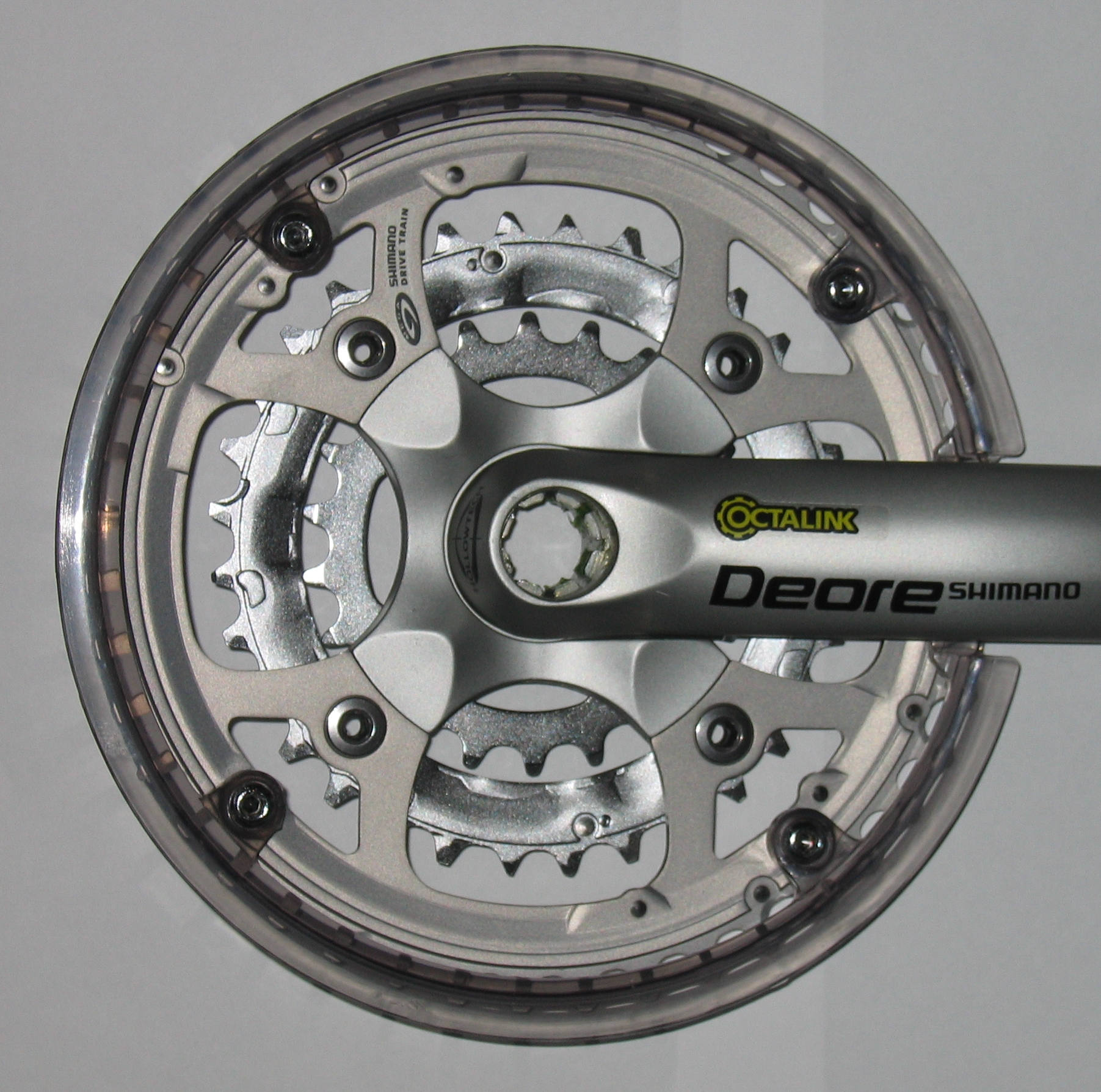
A Shimano Deore right crankset, showing crank arm, spider, three chainrings and chainring guard

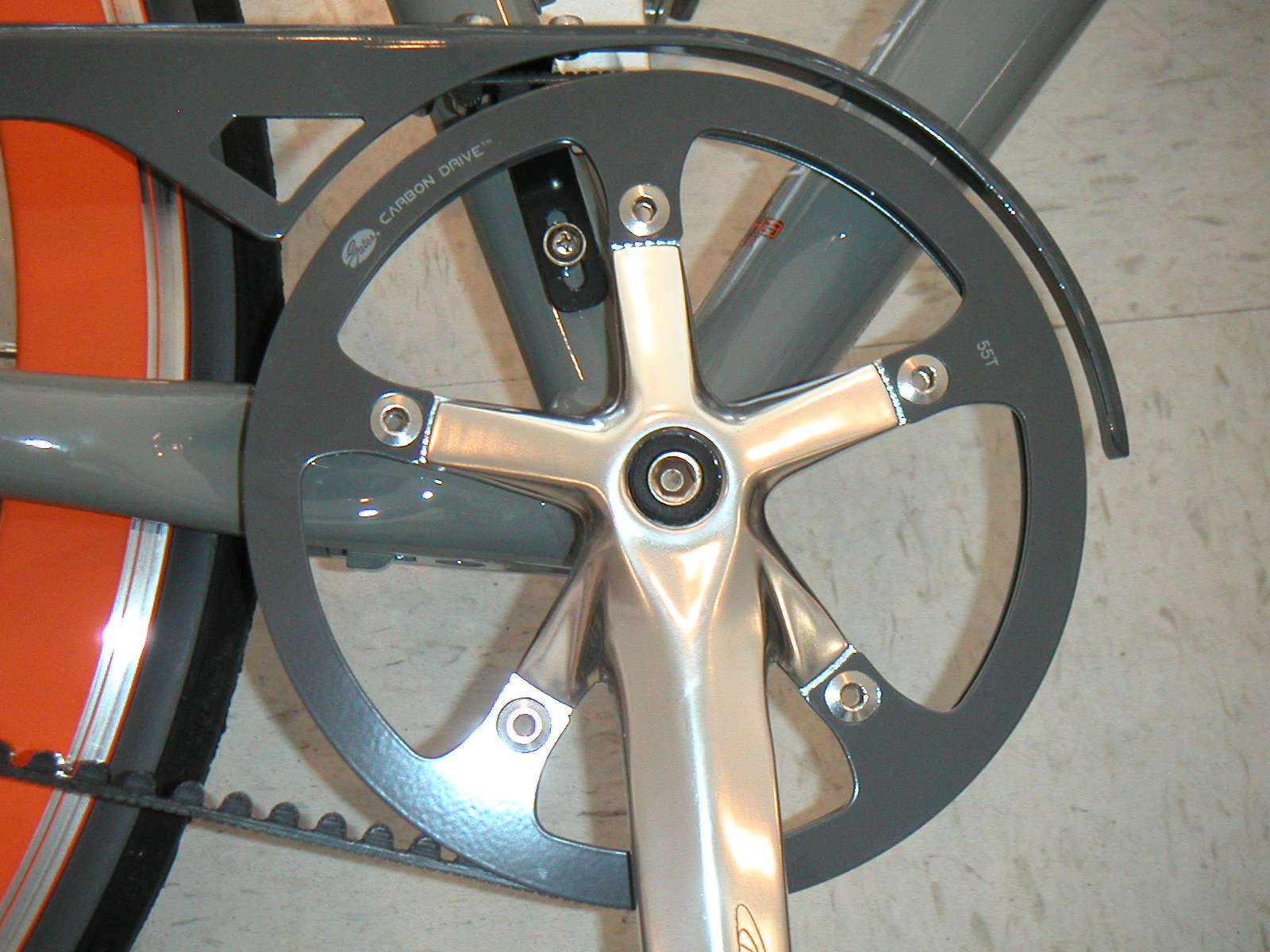
Belt-drive crankset on a Trek District

The crankset (in the US) or chainset (in the UK) is the component of a bicycle drivetrain that converts the reciprocating motion of the rider's legs into rotational motion used to drive the chain or belt, which in turn drives the rear wheel. It consists of one or more sprockets, also called chainrings or chainwheels, attached to the cranks, also called arms or crankarms, to which the pedals attach. It is connected to the rider by the pedals, to the bicycle frame by the bottom bracket, and to the rear sprocket, cassette, or freewheel via the chain.

== Parts ==
=== Cranks ===
The two cranks, one on each side and usually mounted 180° apart, connect the bottom bracket axle to the pedals.

==== Lengths ====
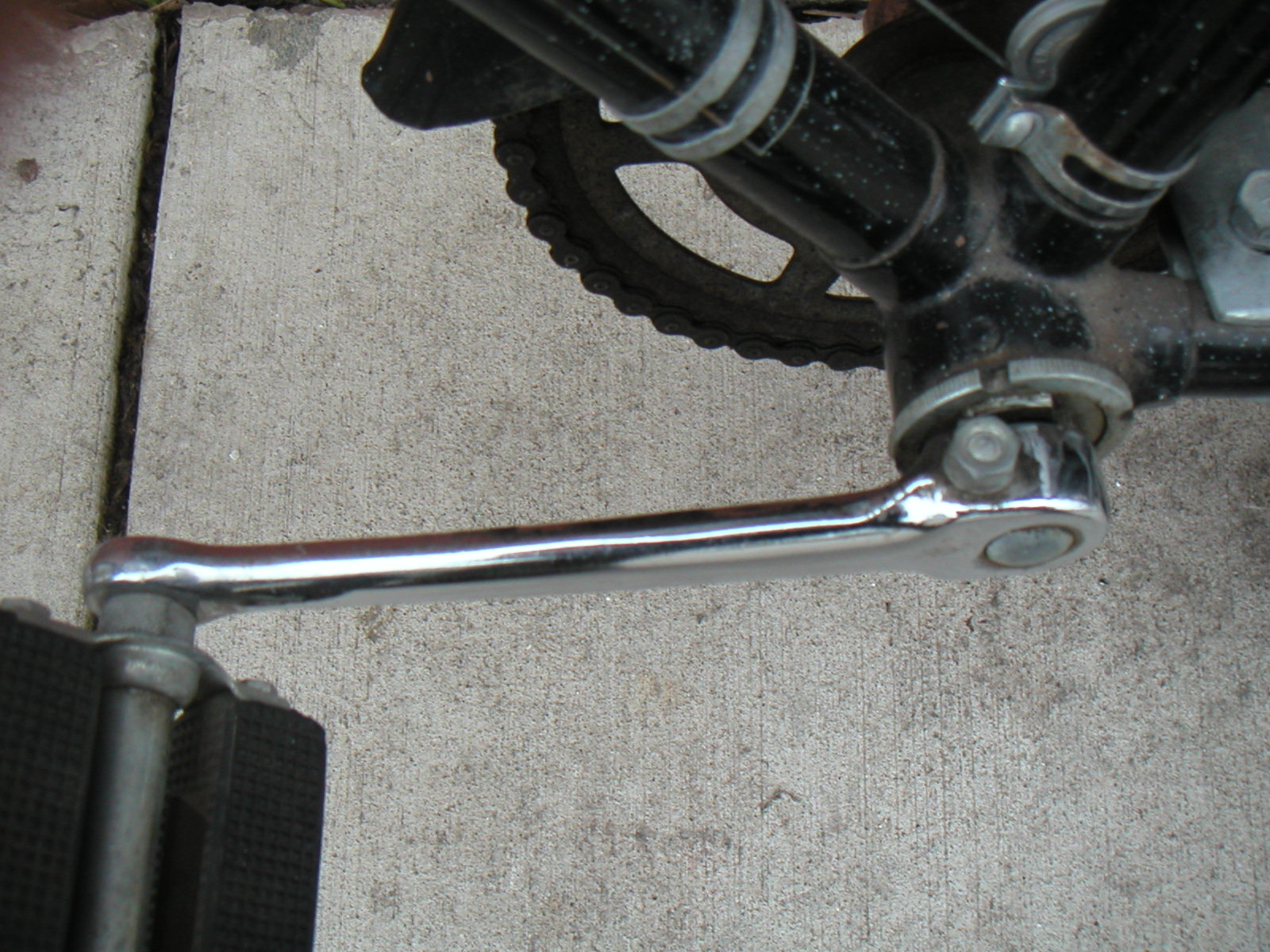
A left crank attached with a cotter

Bicycle cranks can vary in length to accommodate different sized riders and different types of cycling. Crank length is measured from the center of the pedal spindle to the center of the bottom bracket spindle or axle. The larger bicycle component manufacturers typically offer crank lengths for adult riders from 165 to 180 mm (6.5 to 7.1 in) long in 2.5 mm (0.098 in) increments, with 170 mm (6.7 in) cranks being the most common size. A few small specialty manufacturers make bicycle cranks in a number of sizes smaller than 165 mm (6.5 in) and longer than 180 mm (7.1 in). Some manufacturers also make bicycle cranks that can be adjusted to different lengths.

While logic would suggest that, all other things being equal, riders with shorter legs should use proportionally shorter cranks and those with longer legs should use proportionally longer cranks, this is not universally accepted. However, very few scientific studies have definitively examined the effect of crank length on sustained cycling performance and the studies' results have been mixed. Bicycle crank length has not been easy to study scientifically for a number of reasons, chief among them being that cyclists are able to physiologically adapt to different crank lengths. Cyclists are typically more efficient pedalling cranks with which they have had an adaptation period. Several different formulas exist to calculate appropriate crank length for various riders. In addition to the rider's size, another factor affecting the selection of crank length is the rider's cycling specialty and the type of cycling event.

Historically, bicycle riders have typically chosen proportionally shorter cranks for higher cadence cycling such as criterium and track racing, while riders have chosen proportionally longer cranks for lower cadence cycling such as time trial racing and mountain biking. However, the evolution of very low rider torso positions to reduce aerodynamic drag for time trial racing and triathlon cycling can also affect crank selection for such events. Some have suggested that proportionally shorter cranks may have a slight advantage for a rider with a very low torso position and an acute hip angle, especially as the rider pedals near the top-dead-center position of the pedal stroke. Cranks can be shortened for medical reasons using shorteners such as Ortho Pedal.

Unicycle cranks vary in length to accommodate different unicycle wheel sizes, and different unicycling disciplines. As almost all unicycles are ungeared, crank length is a major factor in determining how much force is transmitted to the wheel. Larger wheel diameters, such as 660 to 910 mm (26 to 36 in), require longer cranks, as do disciplines such as Mountain Unicycling, Trials, Street, and Flatland. These unicycles and disciplines commonly use cranks lengths greater than 125 mm (4.9 in). For indoor unicycling such as freestyle or hockey, shorter cranks give a smoother pedaling motion and enable tighter turns without the pedal hitting the floor. Crank lengths of 100 mm (3.9 in) are common, although some riders use cranks as short as 79 mm (3.1 in). As there is no chainwheel on a unicycle, right and left cranks are identical, except for the pedal attachment thread in the left-hand crank, which is reverse threaded.

==== Materials ====
Cranks are constructed of either an aluminum alloy, titanium, carbon fiber, chromoly steel, or some less expensive steel. Tubular steel cranks (such as Tioga's Revolver) can be light and very strong, are usually found on BMX bikes, and are slowly finding their way to mountain bikes (dirt jumping and urban assault). Aluminum cranks may be cast, hot forged or cold forged ("cold" in this context means the billet from which the crank is to be made is heated to a specified temperature well below the melting point, not room temperature). Cold forging gives the metal additional strength, and the cranks can therefore be made lighter without increasing the risk of breakage. Shimano "Hollowtech" aluminum cranks are made by forging the main arms around a hard steel insert which is then withdrawn, leaving an internal void to save weight. They are then welded up before final machining.

==== Attachments ====
===== To the bottom bracket =====
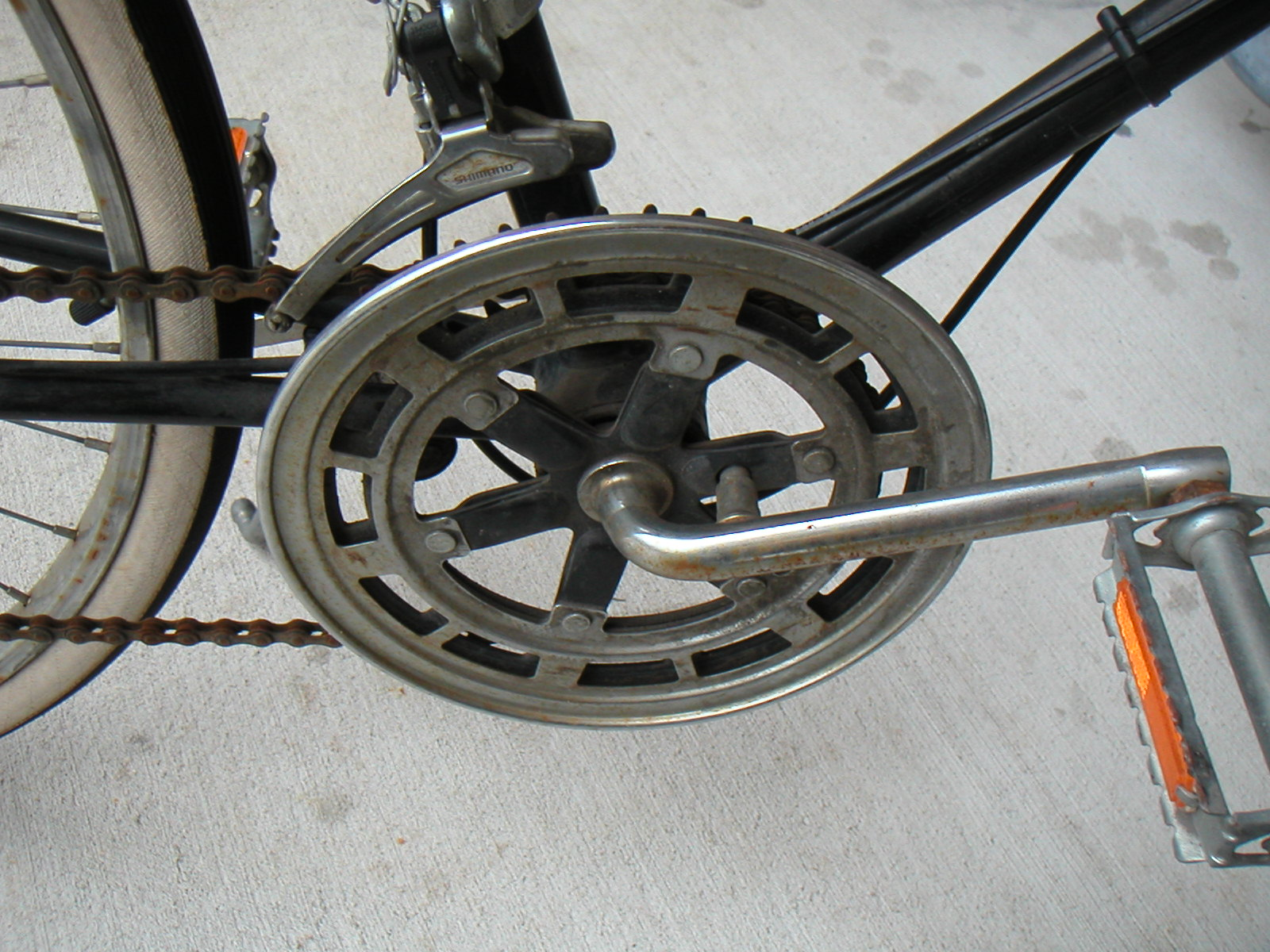
A one-piece ("Ashtabula") crank as seen from the right side

There are a variety of methods used to attach the cranks to the bottom bracket spindle (or axle).

- Older cranks use a wedge-shaped pin, called a cotter, for attachment to the bottom bracket spindle.
- Newer cranks slide onto
  - a square tapered spindle. The taper is 2 degrees with respect to the centerline. There are at least two non-interchangeable dimensions (e.g. Shimano and Campagnolo use competing standards in square taper, viz. JIS and ISO respectively, where the ISO spindle is longer and its taper end is slightly smaller. Most parts made by European manufacturers are to the ISO standard, and most Asian manufacturers use the JIS (Shimano) standard), and two orientations: diamond and horizontal square. The hole in the crank in which one screws a crank puller almost always has a diameter of 22 mm (0.87 in), though some old French cranks (Stonglight and T.A.) require a different puller.
  - a hexagonal tapered spindle (Tune components cranks are an example)
  - a splined bottom bracket spindle with two prominent specifications, and numerous uncommon ones. The ISIS spline may be the most common splined standard as it was decided on and supported by several companies. Shimano's Octalink is a common proprietary standard that comes in two forms: version one for XTR, 105, Ultegra and Dura Ace; and version two for every other groupset such as XT, LX and Deore. Truvativ and DMR also have their own proprietary spline interface standards. A 48 splined spindle, such as from Profile Racing, Demolition, and Eighth Inch, is mostly used for BMX, unicycles, and fixed-gear Freestyle.

The cranks are pressed into place and prevented from squirming off via fretting by a bolt or nut installed into or onto the bottom bracket spindle. The head of the bolt or the nut sits inside a counterbore that is also threaded to accept a crank puller tool. The counterbore is often covered with a dust cover.

One solution to the issue of fretting is to use a metal based anti-seize lubricant between the mating parts. Composed of assorted mixtures of aluminum, copper, graphite and nickel powders in a grease base, such lubrication allows repeated assembly and disassembly without wear and the elimination of fretting corrosion during use.

- Even newer designs have the bottom bracket spindle, usually hollow and larger diameter than is possible for bottom brackets with bearings held inside the bottom bracket shell of a bike frame, for reduced weight and increased stiffness, permanently attached to the right crank (Shimano and others) or the left crank (Race Face). The left crank slides onto a spline and is tightened with one or more pinch bolts (Shimano) or is pressed onto a spline by a bolt on the bottom bracket spindle (Race Face).
- The latest from Campagnolo, called Ultra-Torque, has each crank permanently attached to one half of the spindle (called semi-axles) which then join in the middle of the bottom bracket with a Hirth joint and a bolt.
- Certain companies such as Cannondale (BB30 open standard, introduced in 2000) have made their own unique bottom bracket standards requiring changes in the bottom bracket shell of the bicycle frame in order to accommodate the bottom bracket/crank design. The open BB30 standard is gaining popularity on high end bicycle and component manufacturers (Zipp, Specialized, FSA).
- Finally, many children's bikes and older, or less-expensive bikes have one-piece ("Ashtabula") cranks where the two cranks and bottom bracket spindle are forged as one piece of steel (see photograph above).

See the bottom bracket article for more details.

===== To the pedals =====
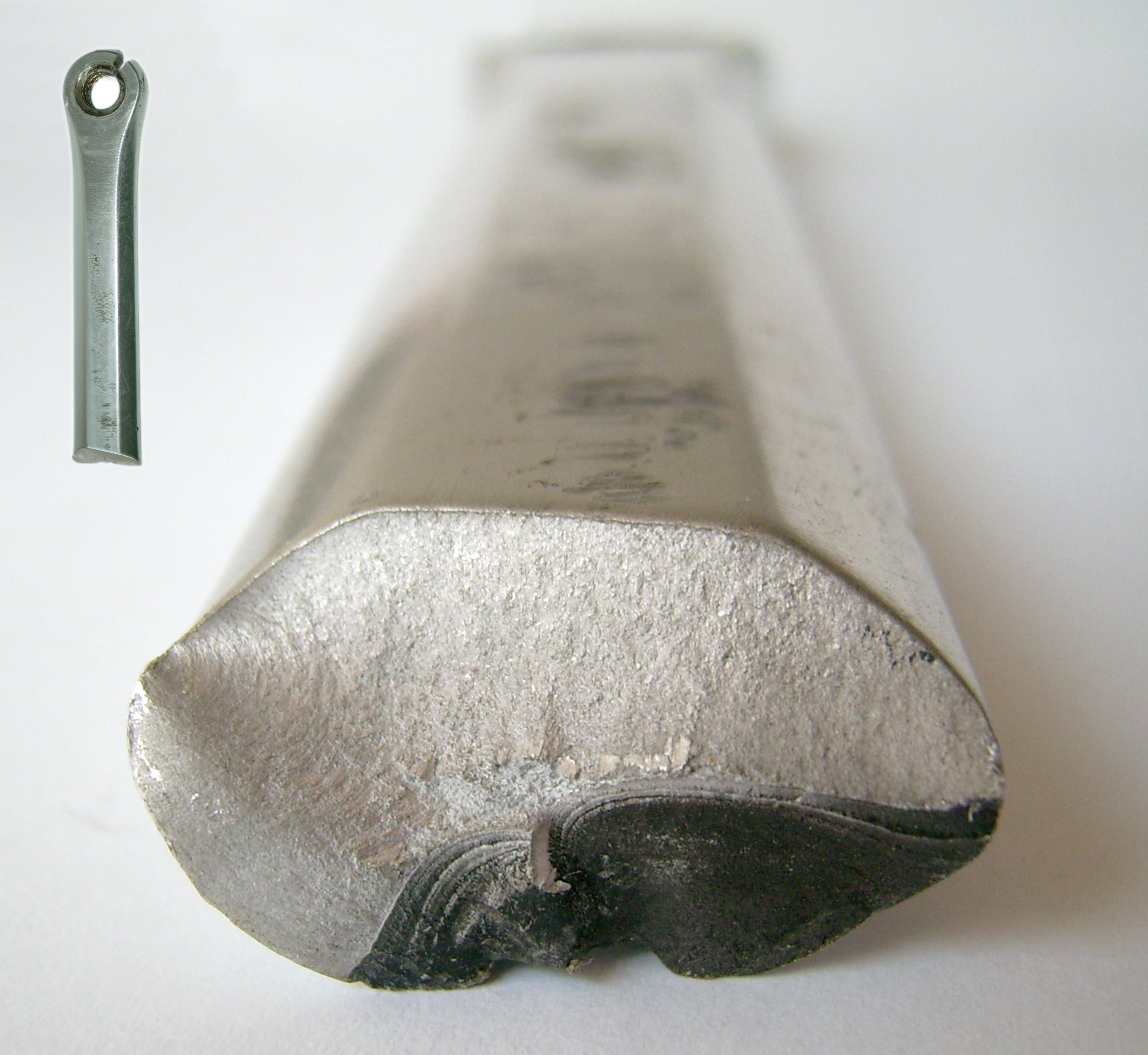
Fracture of an aluminium crank. Bright: brittle fracture. Dark: fatigue fracture.

Crank arms have a threaded hole (or "eye") at their outboard end to accommodate the pedal spindle. Adult or multi-piece cranks have a 9/16 inch hole with 20 TPI (a combination that appears to be unique to this application). One-piece or children's cranks use a 1/2 inch hole. Some cranks on children's bikes have more than one pedal hole so that the pedal can be moved to accommodate growth.

The right-side (usually the chain side) hole is right-hand threaded, and the left-side hole is left-hand (reverse) threaded to help prevent it from becoming unthreaded by an effect called precession.

Pedal spindles are hard steel, and gradually fret and erode the crankarm where the two meet. This can eventually be a cause of crank breakage, which commonly occurs at the pedal eye. Some manufacturers advise the use of a thin steel washer between the pedal and crank, but this is ineffective because the hard washer frets against the crank instead. A solution, suggested by Jobst Brandt, is to use a 45 degree taper at the surface where crank and pedal meet, as this would eliminate precession-induced fretting and loosening (it is already done for most automobile lug nuts for the latter reason). However, this would require manufacturers to change a well-established standard which currently allows most pedals to be fitted to most cranks.

The solution to the issue of fretting is to use a metal based anti-seize lubricant; being composed of assorted mixtures of aluminium, copper, graphite and nickel powders in a grease base – that allows repeated assembly and disassembly without wear and the elimination of fretting corrosion during use.

=== Spider ===
On older styles, the spider—the multi-armed piece that connects the chainring to the bottom bracket axle—was a separate piece from the crank arm. The most common modern cranks have an integrated spider on the drive-side crank arm. However, Middleburn, TA, and Surly currently produce cranks with separate detachable spiders, enabling a wide variety of chainring patterns to be used with the same cranks.

Spiders usually have 4 or 5 arms, although some models have had as few as 3 and as many as 10 arms with 6 having been popular in the past.

==== Bolt circle diameter (BCD) ====
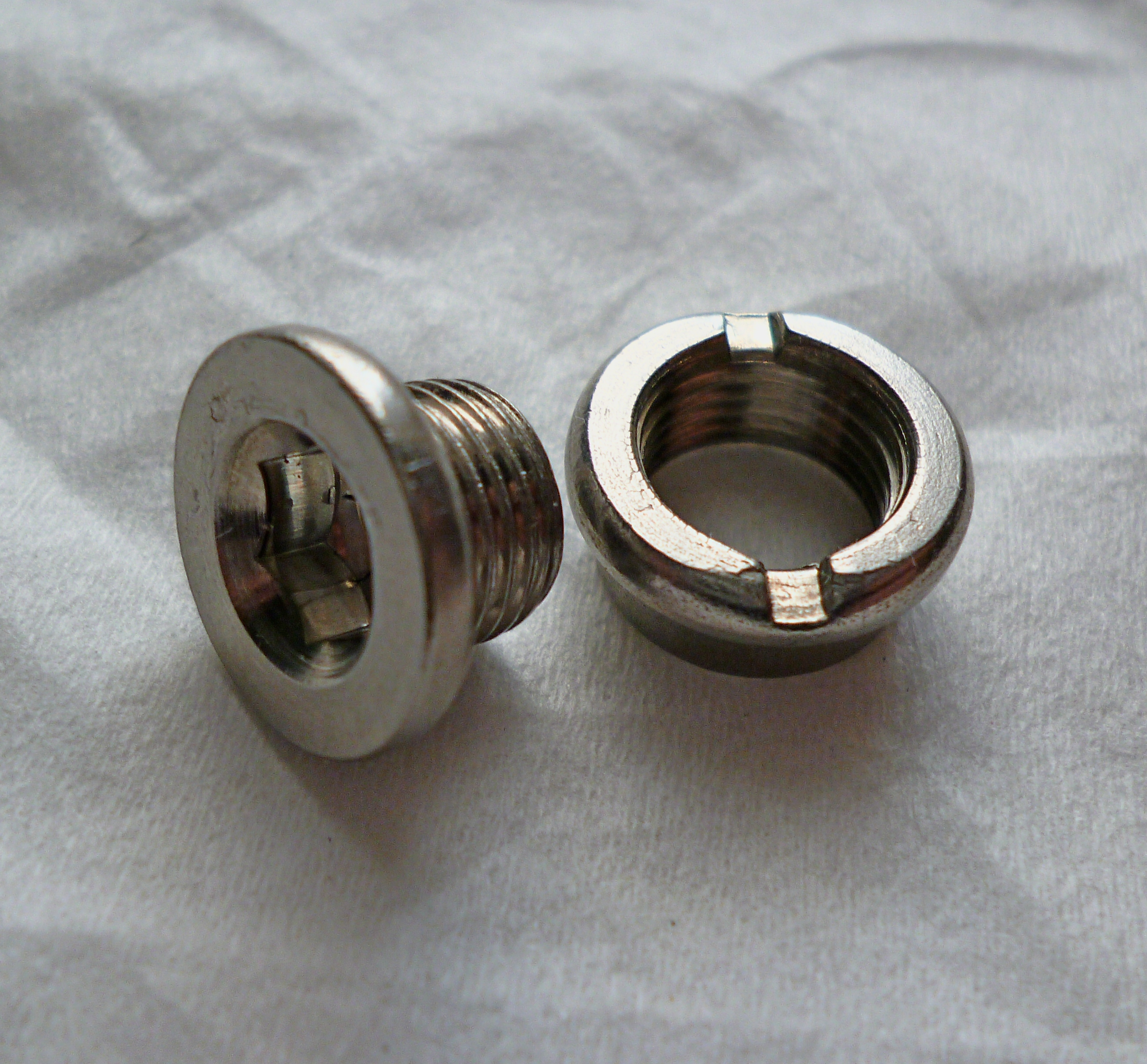
A chainring nut and bolt. The bolts are made in various lengths both to join rings and to fasten the assembly to the spider of the crank. While some have recessed hex fittings in both screw and nut, some like this have a slotted nut that requires the use of a special tool.

Many modern bicycles have removable chainrings, to allow for replacement when worn, or to change the gear ratio provided (although the change is limited).

The holes on the spider arms used for attaching a chainring can have a variety of spacings, referred to as the bolt circle diameter, commonly abbreviated as BCD. This measurement is sometimes referred to as pitch-circle diameter (PCD). Cranks designed to mount one or two chainrings will almost always use a single bolt circle diameter. Cranks designed to mount three chainrings will almost always use two different bolt circle diameters; the larger to mount the two bigger, outer rings and the smaller to mount the smaller, inner ring. Most modern two-chainring cranks use either a 110 or 130 mm (4.3 or 5.1 in) bolt circle diameter.

Bolt circle diameters of common cranks:

vintage single
151 BCD
vintage double
144 BCD
Single
130, 135, or 144 BCD
Road double
130 BCD (Shimano and others), 135 (Campagnolo), or 122 (others)
Road triple
130/74 BCD (Shimano and others), or 135/74 BCD (Campagnolo)
Cyclocross/compact/touring double
110 BCD or (Campagnolo carbon 4×110/1×113 BCD)
Mountain bike (5 arm)/compact/touring triple
110/74 BCD
Mountain bike (4 arm)
104/64 BCD
Mountain bike (5 arm compact)
94/58 BCD
Single, double or triple (3 arm)
70 BCD (René Herse/Compass Bicycles)

=== Chainring ===
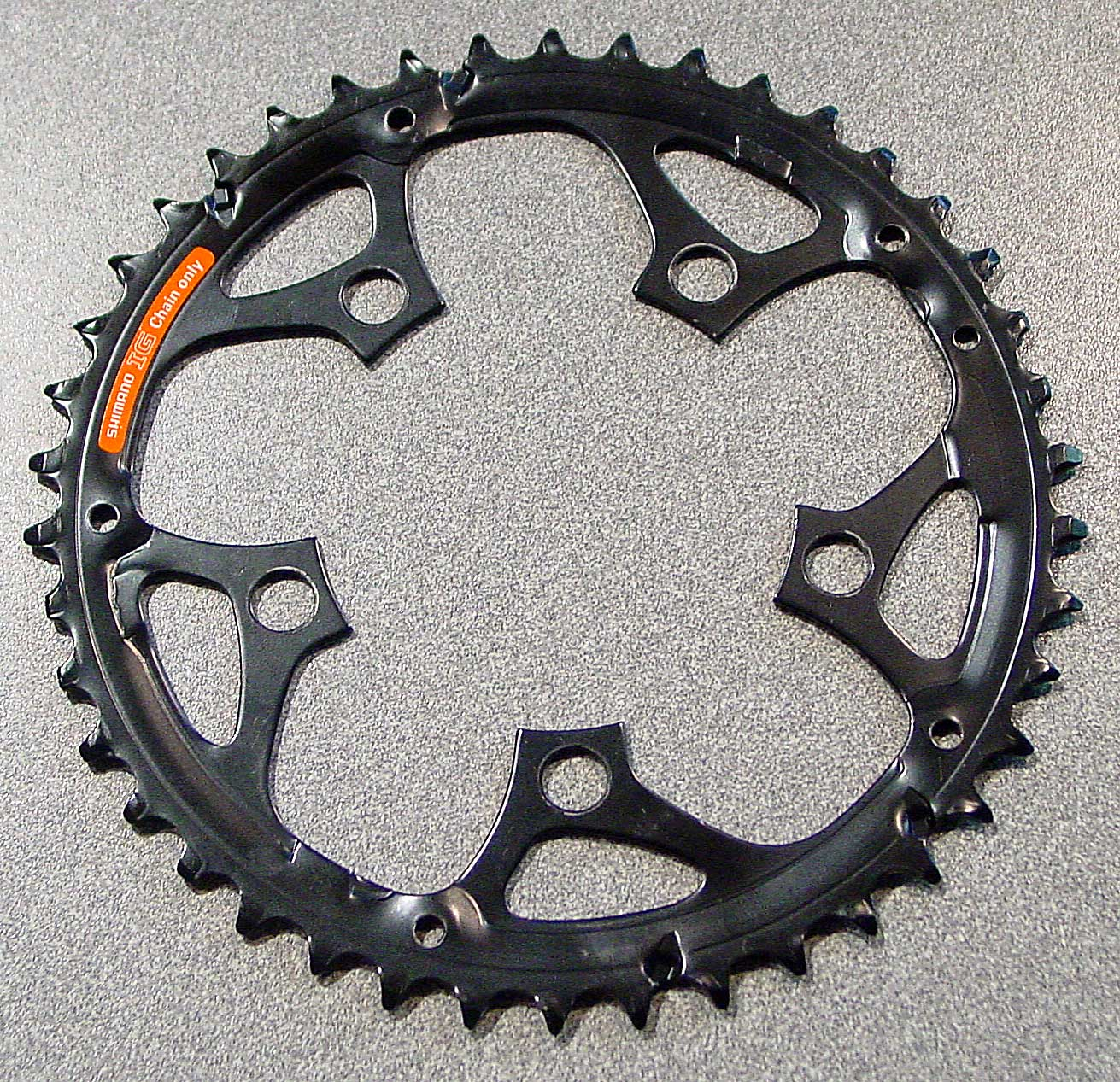
A used Shimano chainring, detached from right crank

Chainrings (also called "chain rings", "chainwheels" or "sprockets", although sprocket is used this way mostly in the BMX community) engage the chain to transfer power to the (usually rear) wheel. They usually have teeth spaced to engage every link of the chain as it passes over; however, in the past, some designs (called skip-tooth or inch-pitch) have had one tooth for every other link of the chain.

==== Sizes ====
By convention, the largest chainring is outboard and the smallest is inboard. Chainrings vary in size from as few as 20 teeth to as many as 60 and potentially more.

Chainrings also come in several nominal widths:

- 3/16″ (4.76 mm) for old-time bikes (especially skip-tooth or inch-pitch), heavy duty BMX, Worksman, and exercise bikes
- 1/8″ (3.18 mm) for track, BMX, cruiser bikes, one-speed, three-speeds, and the rare older 3 or 4 speed derailleur bike.
- 3/32″ (2.38 mm) for road, hybrid, mountain bikes, single-speed and 5-, 6-, 7- and 8 speed freewheels or cassettes.
- 5/64″ (1.98 mm) for any bike with 9- or 10-speed cassettes

==== Materials ====
Chainrings are constructed of either an aluminum alloy, titanium, steel, or carbon fiber.

==== Construction ====
Cheaper cranksets may have the chainrings welded or riveted directly to the crank arm or spider. More expensive sets have the chainrings bolted on so that they can be replaced if worn or damaged, or to provide different gearing.

Replacement chainrings must be chosen with a bolt-hole count and spacing that matches the spider.

Chainrings designed for use with multi-chainring crank arms may have ramps or pins to aid in shifting. The middle chainring, in the case of a triple crankset, usually has the most shaping to aid in shifting up and down. The smallest chainring usually has the least, if any shaping.

== Variations ==
=== Tandem cranksets ===
On tandem bicycles the pedalling contribution of both riders is often combined and coordinated by the crank arms. There may be a second set of chainrings, often on the opposite side from the regular drive train, one on each crank set and connected by a separate chain. The most common implementation has both cyclists pedaling at exactly the same pace and usually in phase, although it is possible to configure the system for out-of-phase pedaling.

The most common tandem crankset is a set of four cranks. Both left cranks have spiders and chainrings to be connected by a timing chain, and only one of the right cranks has a spider for the drive chain.

There are tandem cranksets available called independent pedaling system cranksets, which allow each cyclist to pedal, or not, at their own pace.

=== Chain guards ===
Some chainrings can be outfitted with a chain guard — a plastic or metal ring slightly larger in diameter than the chainring. Its purpose is mostly to help prevent the chain from touching or catching clothing. Chain guard is usually mounted on the outboard side of the chainring or, in case of multi-sprocket chainring, on the outboard side of the largest chainring. Single-sprocket chainrings may have chain guards on both inboard and outboard sides, helping keeping the chain on the chainring; this is common on multi-speed juvenile bicycles.

Bicycles that are going to be used in abusive applications, such as freeride and BMX, will often incorporate a very heavy-duty chain guard that is designed to protect the chainrings from physical damage caused by impact with fixed objects; also called 'bashguards', these commonly replace a third (large) chainring.

=== Chainguides ===
Some cranksets used for freeride and downhill mountain biking have a chainguide installed. A chainguide is a metal or plastic housing that keeps the chain on the chainrings over rough terrain and during technical riding. Most chainguides are designed for only one front chainring, but there are a few dual-ring chainguides available such as the E13 DRS and MRP LRP. Chainguides include a channel on the top of the chainring to keep the chain in line (for models designed for one front chainring) and a roller or sprocket on the bottom to help keep the chain engaged with the chainring. These are almost always used in conjunction with bashguards. Exceptions including the E.thirteen LG-1 and the MRP G2 (and now the G2 SL) do exist which use integrated skid plates, removing impact forces from the crank's spider and transferring them to the frame.

=== Freewheeling cranksets ===
Some cranksets have been produced that incorporate a ratcheting mechanism to accommodate coasting. In this case, the chain continues to rotate with the rear wheel when the rider stops pedaling. The ultimate goal of freewheeling cranks is to allow the rider to shift the chain while coasting. Shimano's discontinued FF system (Front Freewheeling) is one of the more commonly seen examples.

=== Left-side-drive ===
This configuration consists of a left crank arm with a spider and chainring, and a right crank arm without a spider, the opposite of a normal configuration. If used with a screw-on freewheel, a special hub with a left hand thread for a special freewheel must be used, which is also threaded left hand and ratchets the opposite direction of a normal freewheel. If the freewheel and hub were threaded with right hand threads, the torque applied by pedaling would loosen and unthread the freewheel from the hub.

Left-side-drive is sometimes done with a fixed gear drivetrain. Because the lock ring prevents the sprocket from unscrewing, it can be used for left-side drive without requiring special left hand threaded parts.

Note that if a normal right-side-drive crankset is installed backwards to create a left-side-drive bicycle, the threaded pedal holes at the end of the crank arms would be reversed. In this configuration, precession may loosen the pedals over time, causing the pedals to become detached and/or damaging the pedal threading in the crank arms. A front crankset designed for tandem use is a commercially available option, since this has a chainring for the timing chain on the left side, though choice of chainring sizes may be limited.

=== Independent crank arms ===
At least one manufacturer offers a crankset in which the crank arms may rotate independently. This is supposed to aid in training by requiring each leg to move its own pedal in a full circle. One independent study has demonstrated training with these cranks can improve cycling efficiency. The manufacturer also claims that this change can also be useful to aid in running improvement, help prevent injuries in runners, improve core strength development, and are useful for the rehabilitation of lower extremity injuries, especially in the athlete. The manufacturer claims these cranks have been used as a training tool by several World and Olympic Champions in both cycling and triathlon and several professional sports teams including MLB and NFL teams, and other uses.

=== Non-round chainrings ===
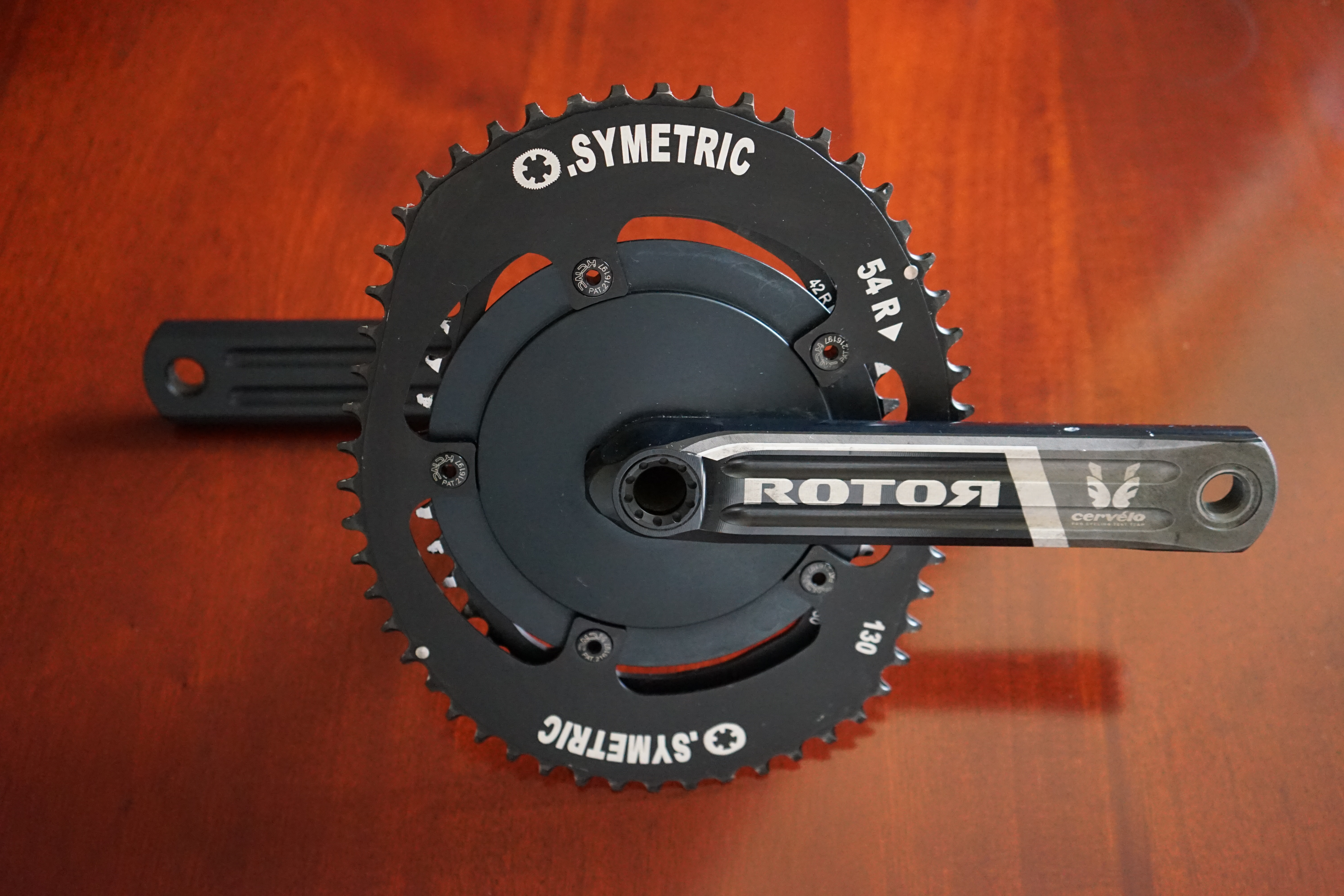
Rotor Cervelo crankset mounted with non-round Osymetric chainrings

Non-round chainrings have been around almost as long as the safety bicycle frame, with the first designs appearing in the late 1880's. Countless designs have been launched since then. The 1980s saw a uptick in interest, with retired pro Edmond Polchlopek launching a non-round ring, followed by Shimano Biopace. These did not achieve commercial or racing success and were followed in later decades by Osymetric's Harmonic ring, Rotor's Q-Rings, and a flurry of variant designs (Launched soon after ROTOR's success in professional racing) like Absolute Black and Ridea's PowerRing. These are designed to provide varying mechanical advantage at different points in the pedal stroke, effectively changing the gear ratio at different angles of rotation with the intention to be more ergonomic. Non-round chainrings can sometimes cause problems in front shifting. Though the benefits of oval chainrings are still disputed in the press and among manufacturers, one study claimed significant benefits, namely that the rider would gain an additional 8 watts of power.

Their popularity in the late eighties to early nineties is best reflected in their widespread use by professional cyclists of that time. However, one hold-out has been Team CSC Saxo Bank veteran Bobby Julich, and there are still a couple of pro riders using them as late as 2011. Notably Bradley Wiggins of Team Sky, David Millar of Team Garmin Transitions and Agritubel's Geoffrey Lequatreall riding the Osymetric brand and Team CSC Saxo Bank's Carlos Sastre with Rotor's Q-Rings from his native Spain. Sastre won the 2008 Tour de France with Q-rings. Bradley Wiggins has used an elliptical chainring from Osymetric since at least 2009, including in his victory of the 2012 Tour de France. In the 2010 Giro d'Italia, and David Millar used them in his 2011 victory in the final TT of the 2011 Giro. Several Pro-Tour teams were using Osymetric and Q-Rings elliptical chainrings for road racing and time trialing. In the 2013 Tour, Chris Froome drew attention with his oval chainring, manufactured by Osymetric.

=== Compact crankset ===
In the context of mountain biking the term compact crankset, or micro drive, refers to smaller triple cranksets, giving a small benefit in weight at the expense of increased wear and also giving the bike better clearance over obstacles. Typical ratios would be 22/32/44 teeth as opposed to 28/38/48 or 24/36/46 teeth. These would be used with smaller cassettes (Generally cassettes are available with 11 tooth minimum gear sizes for compact chainsets while standard chainsets were designed for cassettes with a 13 or 14 tooth top gear), giving the same overall ratio. Compact chainrings have been the dominant standard for mountain bike cranks since the mid nineties.

In the context of road cycling, compact drivetrain typically refers to double cranksets with a smaller (usually 110 mm (4.3 in)) bolt circle diameter than the standard 130 mm (5.1 in) or Campagnolo's 135 mm (5.3 in). As of 2006, all of the major component manufacturers such as Shimano and Campagnolo offer compact cranks in their midrange and high-end product lines. The compact crankset provides a compromise between the standard road double crankset (with 39/52 or 39/53 tooth chainrings) and the road triple (with 30/42/52 or 30/39/53 tooth chainrings). The compact crankset has two chainrings and typical ratios are 34/48, 34/50 and 36/50. This provides nearly the same lower gear ratios as a triple but without the need for a third chainring, a triple front derailleur and a long cage rear derailleur. Both Shimano and Campagnolo recommend and sell front derailleurs specifically designed for compact cranksets, claiming better shifting.

Compact gearing is not necessarily lower than standard gearing if cassettes with smaller sprockets (such as 11–23) are used. A high gear of 50×11 on a compact drivechain is actually slightly higher than the 53×12 of a standard set.

Compact gearing usually has a large percentage jump between the two chainrings. In balance, it may also allow small jumps in the rear by allowing a closer ratio cassette to be used, except for the 9% jump at the high end between the 11 and 12 tooth sprockets.

=== Bent crankarms ===
Marketed and known by a variety of names (Z-cranks, P.M.P cranks, etc.) non-straight crank arms have been introduced several times. However, "as long as the distance from crank axle to pedal is fixed, there is no pedaling advantage in using bent crank arms". Possible disadvantages from comparable straight crank arms include more weight and more flex.

=== Rotor Box System ===
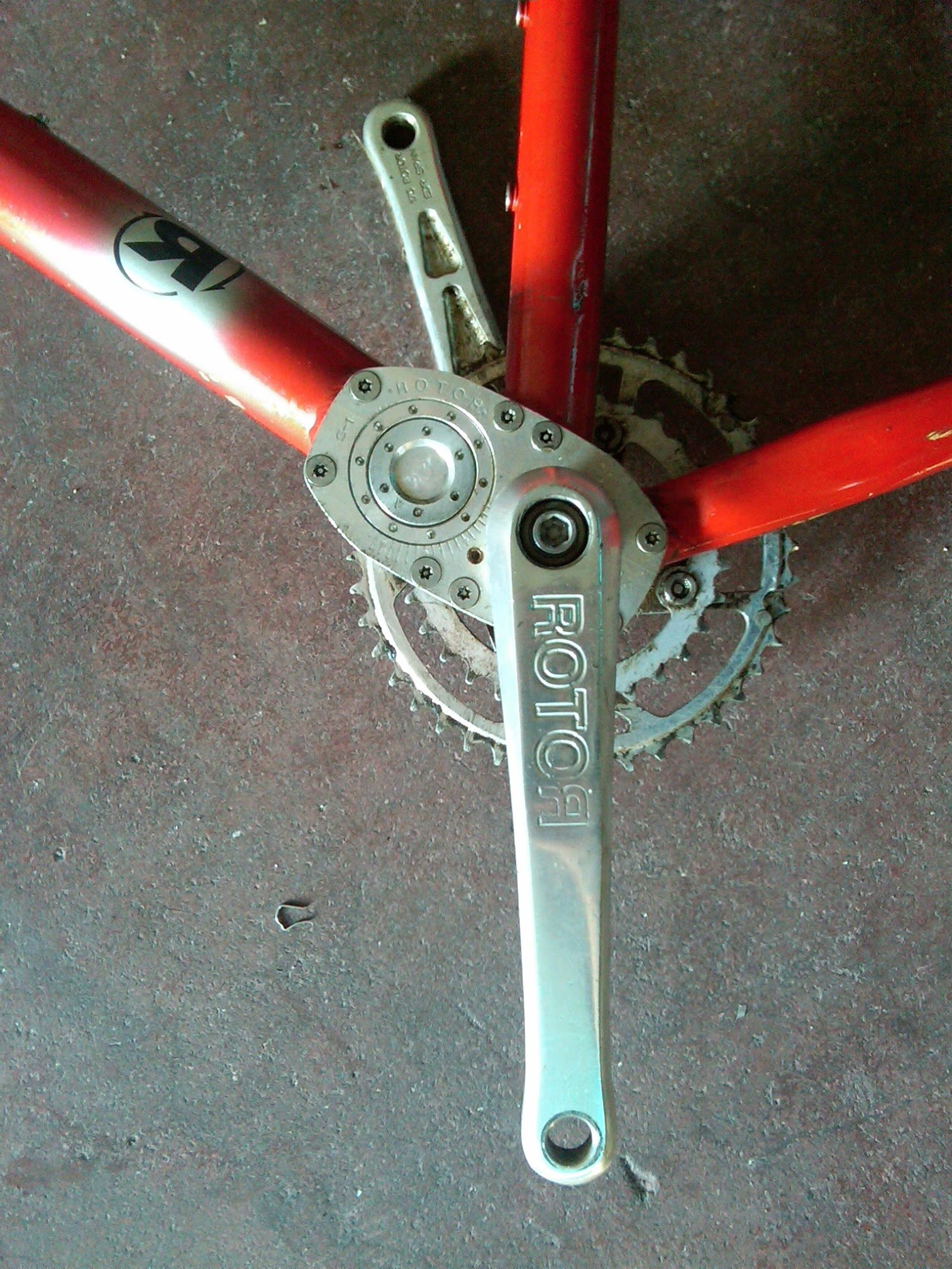
closeup of Rotor Box bicycle Bottom Bracket

Rotor is a trade name of a type of crank used in the transmission system of a bicycle. The Rotor crank was developed by Aeronautic Engineering School students in Madrid, Spain in 1995 and was later commercialised. While Rotor Box found success with recreational road and mountain cyclists, many competitive cyclists continue to use the traditional fixed system as offered by major manufacturers Campagnolo and Shimano, amongst others. One major factor is weight— the Rotor Box System is 50%–75% heavier than most competitive cranks. Other negative factors include higher purchase cost than other fine cranksets, and increased maintenance due to the complexity of the system. These cranksets are no longer in production, and availability of some parts is problematic. However the bearings are standard parts. A few parts, like links, are still distributed. This system originated as a cog-driven internal mechanism inside a purpose built bicycle's bottom bracket. In this first "ROTOR Box" design, the drive-side crank had an offset chainring spider with round rings. The drive side crank's gear ratio varied during the pedalling cycle by moving the round chainring upward and downward in regards to the crank's axle. The non-drive side crank was accelerated and decelerated by a gearing mechanism inside the bottom bracket to mimic the gear ratio variation the drive side crank went through, at an exact 180 degree phase-offset. While highly effective mechanically, these bicycles were costly and the significant movement of the chainring made shifting quality problematic.

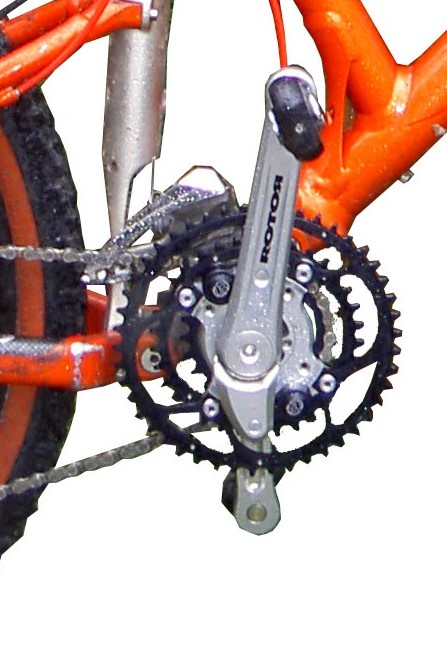
closeup of a ROTOR System RS4X crankset

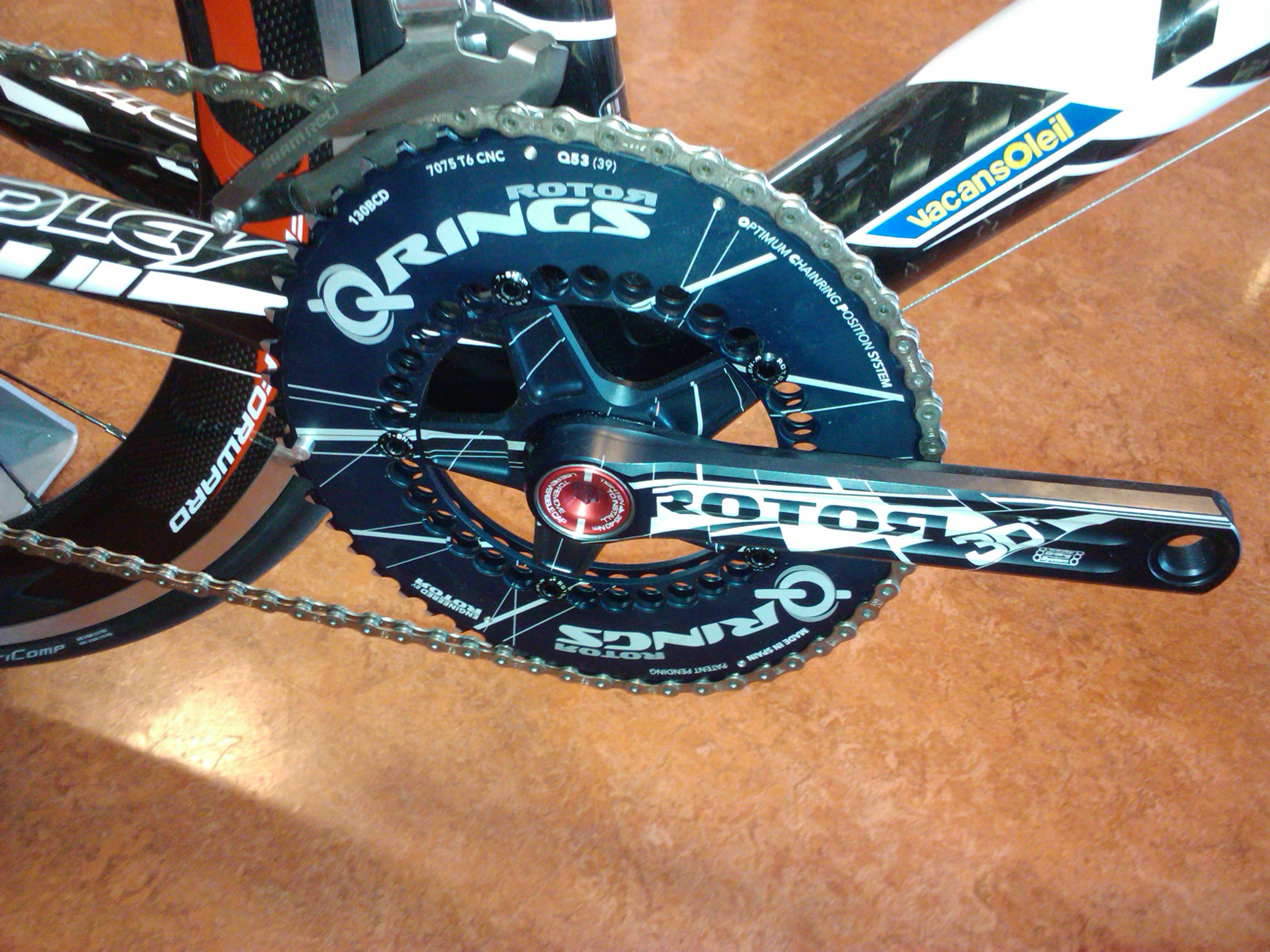
Rotor crankset with Q-Rings

Later generation ROTOR System cranks moved the mechanism into an orbital chainring spider with a fixed rotational axis. These "ROTOR System" cranksets fit into classic BSA and ITA bicycle frames. Unlike a standard pair of cranks that always remain at 180 degrees relative to each other, the ROTOR system varies this angle through the circle of motion. The left and right crank arms speed up and slow down independently, relative to the chainrings during the pedalling cycle. The mechanism causing this is designed by offsetting the axis of rotation of the crank spindle and spider, then connecting the spider to the individual crank arms via two independent links.

As the crank rotates, the distance between the axle and spider varies. By placing a pivot point on the crank arm and the spider and connecting these via linkages, the varying axle to spider distance pivots the linkages up and down, pushing the cranks forward and pulling them backward relative to the chainrings during the rotation. This increases and decreases the effective gear the cyclists' two legs push as the crankset rotates. The effect of these movements eliminates the dead spot (where little power is produced) at the top and bottom of the pedaling cycle, and reduces knee strain. The manufacturer claims that power output relative to heart rate is increased, amongst other claimed benefits.

It takes a couple of weeks of regular use to become accustomed to the unusual feel of the Rotor linkage cranksets. After becoming accustomed to it, most riders prefer it. However, there is no difficulty in switching between ordinary cranksets and Rotor linkage cranksets. Once a rider has learned to use Rotor linkage cranksets the adaption when switching back and forth between crankset types only takes a minute or two.

Many competitive cyclists, including the Cervélo TestTeam, use Rotor's Q-rings which mimic the fluctuation in gear size without the added weight. However Rotor Q-rings and other non-round rings cannot duplicate the crank arm movements that allow application of power through the dead spots of the pedaling cycle. Non-round rings also increase the difficulty of setting up the front derailleur, while Rotor linkage cranksets present no extra difficulty in that regard.

=== Planetary-drive ===
A planetary-gear crankset offers two different gear ratios with just one chainring. This can have at least two advantages: shifting while not pedaling and fewer chances for the chain to come off the chainring. The Mountain Drive & Speed-Drive by Schlumpf Innovations and the Hammerschmidt are examples.

=== Narrow wide chainring ===
A narrow wide chainring has teeth which are shaped differently for every other tooth. They are the same viewed from the side of the bicycle, but from the front or rear, one tooth is wide and the next is narrow. The pattern continues, narrow wide narrow wide, hence the name. The purpose is to prevent the chain coming off the chainring. It is largely effective at this. Narrow wide chainrings are now standard on premium mountain bikes which have one chainring and a wide cassette up to 50 teeth.

A disadvantage is that they are not compatible with double or triple chainrings.

== See also ==
- Bicycle gearing
- Bicycle pedal
- Biopace
- Bottom bracket
- Gearbox bicycle
