= Honda RN-01 G-cross =

Mountain bike produced by Honda

The Honda RN-01 G-Cross is a mountain bike produced by Honda specifically for downhill racing events. Honda is not a manufacturer of bicycles and this bike is not commercially available to the general public. It was introduced in the 2004 racing season by the Team G Cross Honda who competed in the NORBA and Mountain Bike World Cup points series races.

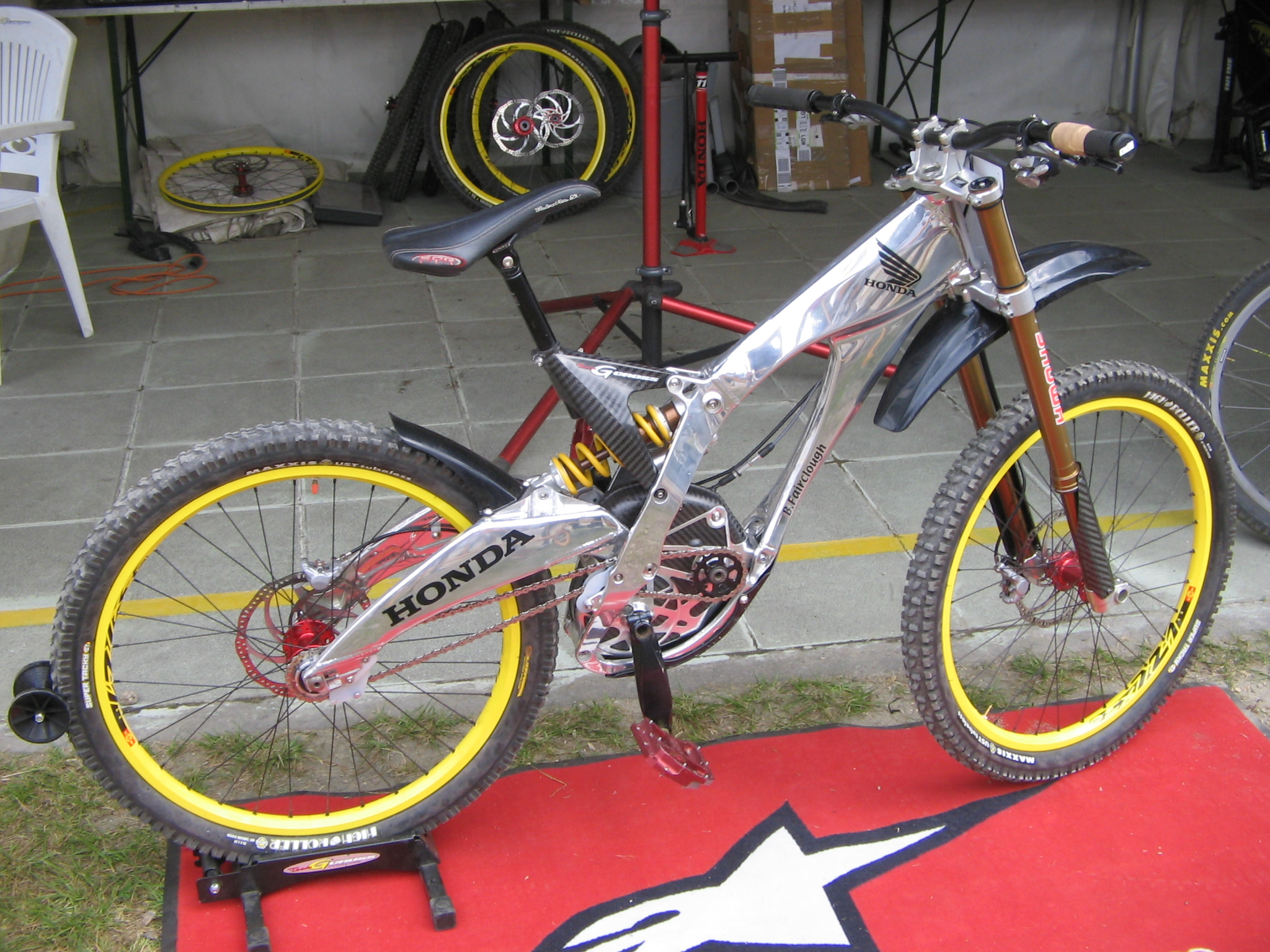
A Honda RN-01 mountain bike

What sets it apart from most other bicycles is the fact that it was developed specifically for race use by the Honda team using many purpose-made components not commercially available. It is also different in that it uses an internal gearbox instead of an external (derailleur) gearing system, which, although not unique to this bicycle, is quite rare. The gearbox on the RN-01 is specific because it is not a classic gearbox such as the Rohloff Speedhub, for example. Inside the gearbox there is a classic derailleur, a cassette and a chainring. The freewheel is not placed on the rear wheel but in the bottom bracket, so the chain is constantly moving when the back wheel is spinning, being a "front freewheel" system. This allows the rider to shift gears without pedaling.

Honda was protective of the internal gearbox technology, often requiring mechanics to remove the gearbox from the bicycle after use.

Honda chose South African rider Greg Minnaar to debut this bike in 2004 as the then reigning World Downhill Champion.

With the Honda G-Cross Team ceasing to compete after 2007, the project came to an end. The bicycle and gearbox design is not to be available to the general public.

== See also ==
- Gearbox bicycle
