= Edmond Polchlopek =

French cyclist and bicycle designer

Personal information
- Full name: Edmond Polchlopek
- Born: 20 July 1934 Courseulles-sur-Mer, France
- Died: 21 September 2004 (aged 70) Compiègne, France

Cycling career
- Sport: Cycling
- Discipline: Road

Professional teams
- 1961: Margnat-Rochet-Dunlop
- 1962–1963: Margnat-Paloma

Edmond Polchlopek (20 July 1934 – 21 September 2004) was a French road racing cyclist and a bicycle designer. The so-called Polchlopek crankset was the first elliptical chainring to be commercialized.
