= Outline of cycling =

Overview and topical guide

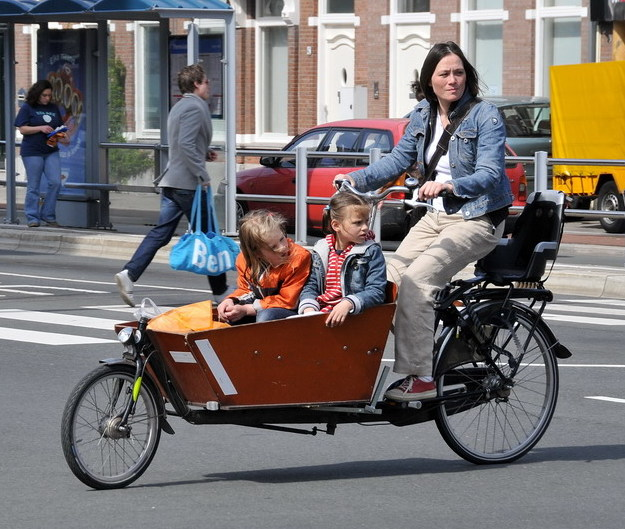
Dutch woman cycling with two young children, using a two-wheeled box-bike

Cycling, also known as bicycling or biking, is the activity of riding bicycles or other human-powered vehicles with wheels, (Note: but occasionally powered by the arms) for transportation, recreation, exercise, sport and other purposes. (Note: such as walking your dog while riding)

People who engage in cycling are called cyclists, bikers, or bicyclists. They may wear everyday clothing suited to their destination or specialized cycling attire, sometimes carrying an additional set of clothes.

Cycling includes not only traditional two-wheeled bicycles but also unicycles, tricycles, quadricycles, and other human-powered vehicles (HPVs). Some bicycles are equipped with electric motors (e-bikes) or other forms of motor assistance.

Cycling can be done individually or with others. Passengers may ride in front, (Note: for instance, in the box of a cargo bike) sit on a luggage carrier, or use specially designed seats for children or pets. Some bicycles, such as tandem bicycles or multi-rider bike, allow multiple riders to pedal together.

Cycling takes place on roads, bike lanes, and off-road, trails. Riders may share roads with motor vehicles, use designated cycling infrastructure, or ride on separated cycle tracks where available.

== Aspects of cycling ==
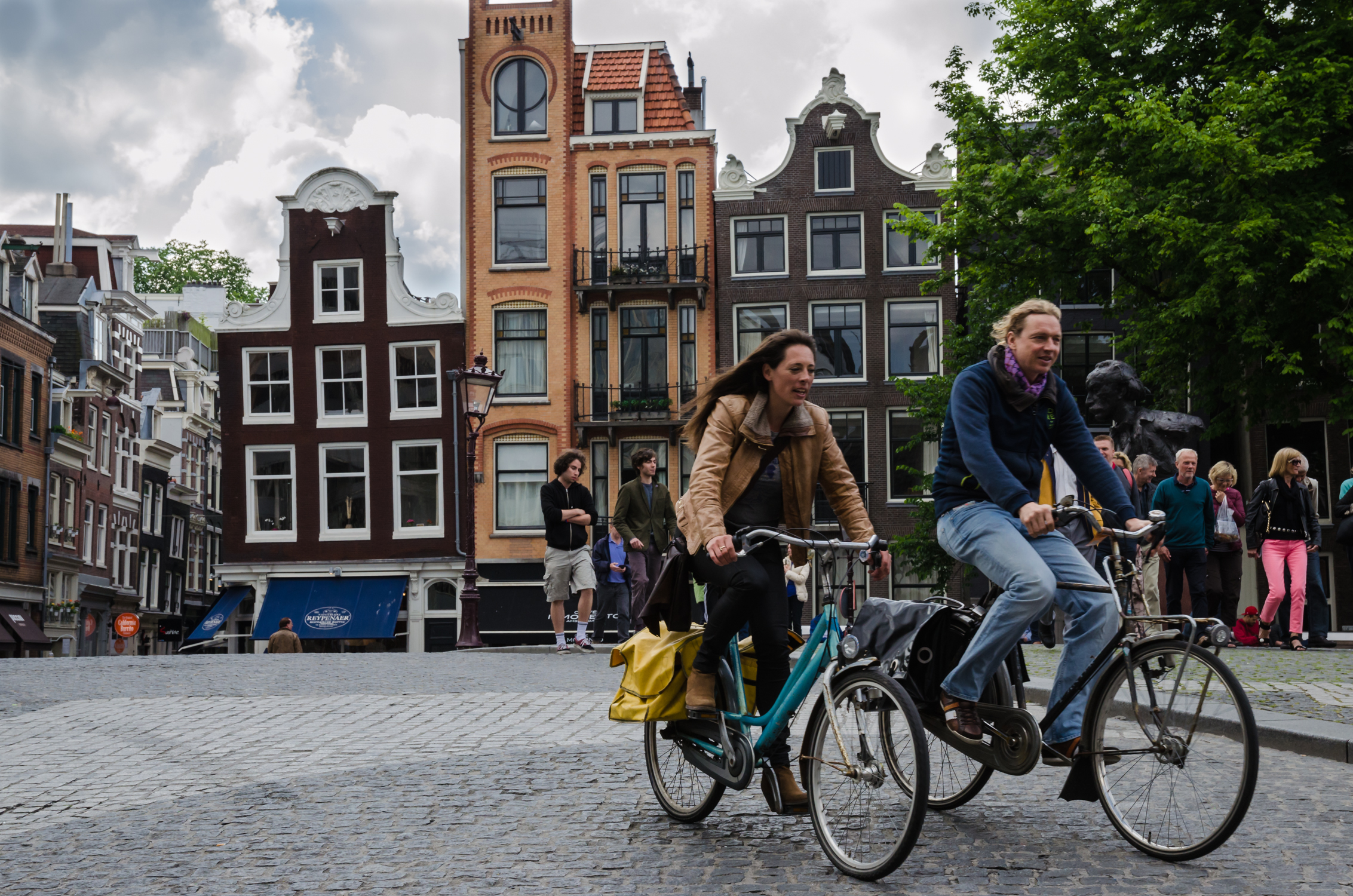
Cycling in Amsterdam

Cycling can be described as any or all of the following:

- Exercise
- Recreation
- Sport
- Commuting
- Transportation

== Cycling equipment ==
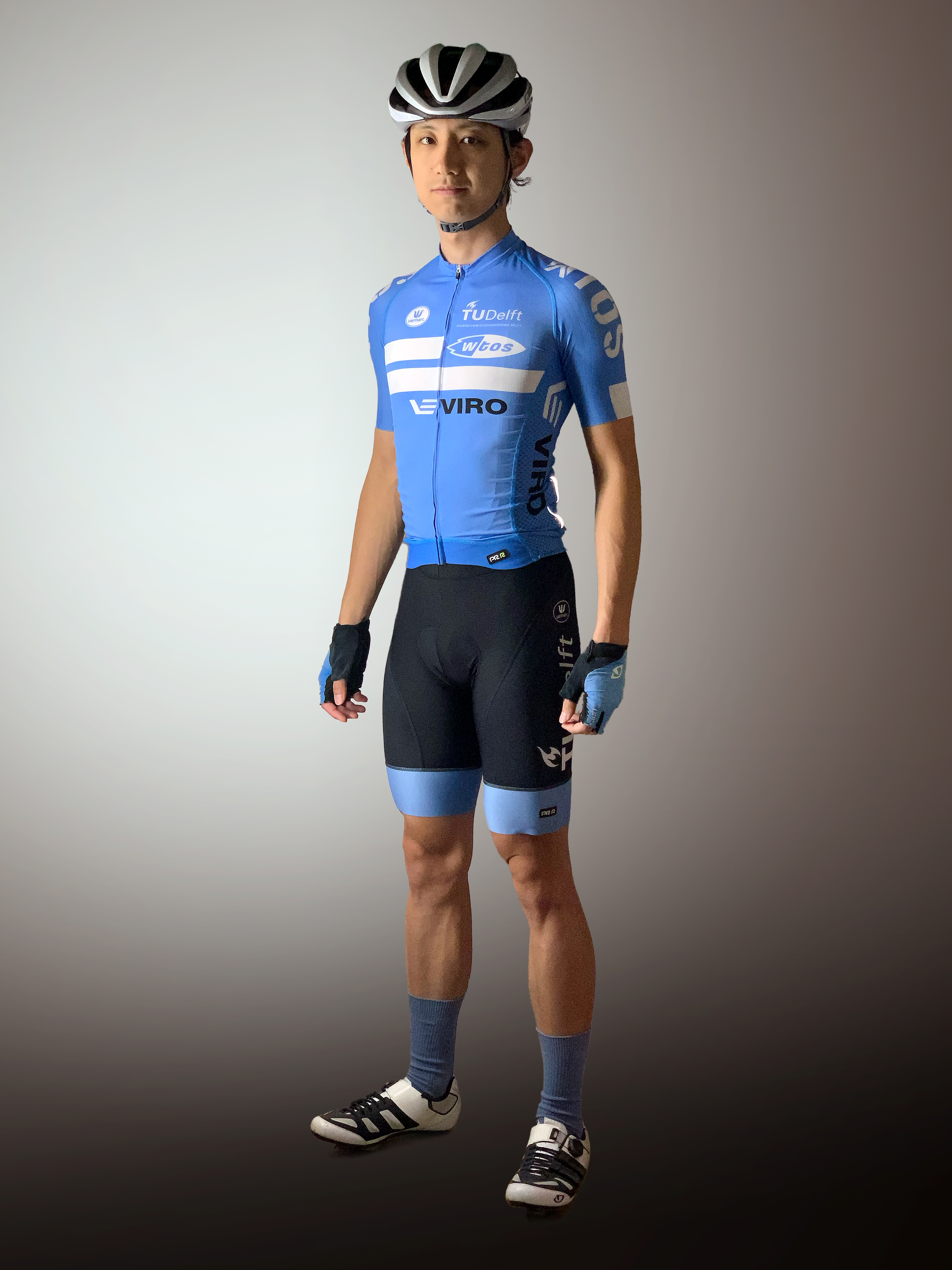
A road cyclist wearing a typical summer road cycling kit

The first piece of equipment is a bicycle (see Outline of bicycles).

Some jurisdictions require these by law:

- Bicycle helmet
- Bicycle lighting
- Bicycle lock
- Bicycle bell
- Bicycle horn

Used, but not always necessary:

- Bicycle tools
- Cycling clothing
  - Cycling gloves
  - Cycling jersey
  - Cycling shoe
  - Cycling shorts
- Cycling computer
  - Speed sensor
  - Power meter
  - Cadence sensor
  - Heart rate monitor
- Time trial cycling equipment

== Cycling law and safety ==
- Bicycle helmet laws by country
  - Bicycle law in California
- Bicycle Safety Camp
- Bicycle safety wing
- Bicycle theft
- CAN-BIKE
- Danish bicycle VIN-system
- Dooring (also known as door zone, door prize)
- Electric bicycle laws
- Hand signals
- "Rules of the Trail"
- Safety in numbers

== Health impact ==
- Detumescence and genital numbness
- Health benefits of cycling
- Ulnar tunnel syndrome

== Types of cycling ==
- Bicycle commuting
- Mountain biking
- Downhill mountain biking
- Mountain bike racing
- Road cycling
- Vehicular cycling
- Freestyle BMX
- BMX racing
- Bicycle touring
- Indoor cycling
- Underwater cycling
- Enduro (mountain biking)
- Mountain bike trials
- Dirt jumping
- Artistic cycling
- Freestyle fixed gear
- Utility cycling
- Track cycling

== Cycling sport ==
- Cycle sport
- List of men's road bicycle races
- List of women's road bicycle races
- Cycling team
- Cycling records
- Cycling sprinter

=== Bicycle racing ===
- List of cycling races in Spain
- List of cycling teams in Spain

==== Doping in cycling ====
- List of doping cases in cycling
  - Lance Armstrong doping case
    - History of Lance Armstrong doping allegations – historic background
  - Floyd Landis doping case
  - Operación Puerto doping case
  - Operation Aderlass
- Doping at the Tour de France
  - Festina affair, a doping scandal at the 1998 Tour
  - Doping at the 1998 Tour de France – other doping cases in that Tour
  - Doping at the 1999 Tour de France
  - Doping at the 2007 Tour de France

==== Track cycling ====
- Track cycling
- List of cycling tracks and velodromes
- List of Asian records in track cycling
- List of European records in track cycling
- List of Oceanian records in track cycling
- List of Olympic Games records in track cycling
- List of Panamerican records in track cycling
- List of Universiade records in track cycling
- List of World Championships records in track cycling
- List of world records in track cycling

=== Summer Olympics ===
- List of Olympic medalists in cycling (men)
- Cycling at the Summer Olympics
- List of Olympic medalists in cycling (women)
- List of Olympic records in cycling
- List of Olympic venues in cycling

== Cycling infrastructure ==
=== Cycling infrastructure ===
(See cycling infrastructure)

- Bicycle-friendly
- Bicycle parking
- Bicycle transportation planning and engineering
- Bikeway controversies
- Cycling demonstration towns
- Cycle track
- Dirt jump
- Greenway
  - Rails with trails
- Pump track
- Safety of cycling infrastructure
- Segregated cycle facilities
- Shared lane marking
- Sustrans
- TTF (Technical Trail Feature)
- United States Numbered Bicycle Routes
- Velodrome

=== Bike paths and trails ===
- Bicycle boulevard
- Bike lane
- Bike path
- Bike route
- Bike singletrack
- Rail trail
- Bike paths and trails by country:
  - Australia
    - Bicycle paths in Melbourne
    - Bike paths in Sydney
  - Canada
    - Beltline Trail (Toronto, Ontario)
    - Capital Pathway (Ottawa, Ontario)
    - Cataraqui Trail (Ontario)
    - Cycloparc PPJ (Pontiac, Quebec)
    - Iron Horse Trail, Ontario (Kitchener-Waterloo, Ontario)
    - Parc Linéaire Le P'tit Train du Nord (Laurentians, Quebec)
    - Riverfront Bike Trail, Windsor, Ontario
    - Riverfront Trail, Greater Moncton (New Brunswick)
    - Route Verte (Quebec)
    - Tomifobia Nature Trail (Eastern Townships, Quebec)
    - West Toronto Railpath (Toronto, Ontario)
  - Denmark
    - Bike routes in Denmark
  - Europe:
    - EuroVelo – European cycle route network
  - United States († - indicates primarily for hiking):
    - American Discovery Trail†
    - Colorado Trail† (Colorado)
    - Farlow Gap (North Carolina)
    - Neuse River Trail (North Carolina)
    - Massanutten Trail† (Virginia)
    - Virginia Creeper Trail (Virginia)

=== Bicycle sharing systems ===
Bicycle sharing system

- B-cycle (34 United States cities)
- Santander Cycles (London, United Kingdom)
- Bicing (Barcelona, Spain)
- Bike rental
- Bike sharing
- BIXI Montréal (Montréal, Canada)
- Call a Bike (about 36 German cities)
- Community bicycle program
- Hubway (Boston, United States)
- Stockholm City Bikes (Stockholm, Sweden)
- Vélib' (Paris, France)
- Vélo'v (Lyon, France)

== Cycling by region ==
- Cycling in Azerbaijan
- Cycling in Australia
  - Cycling in New South Wales
    - Cycling in Sydney
  - Cycling in Victoria
    - Cycling in Melbourne
  - Cycling in Western Australia
    - Cycling in Perth
- Cycling in Canada
  - Cycling in Toronto
- Cycling in Denmark
  - Cycling in Copenhagen
- Cycling in France
  - Cycling in Paris
- Cycling in Germany
  - Cycling in Berlin
  - Cycling in Munich
- Cycling in Hong Kong
- Cycling in India
- Cycling in Japan
- Cycling in Malaysia
  - Cycling in Kuala Lumpur
- Cycling in Malta
- Cycling in Romania
  - Cycling in Bucharest
- Cycling in the Netherlands
  - Cycling in Amsterdam
- Cycling in New Zealand
  - Cycling in Auckland
- Cycling in North Korea
- Cycling in the Philippines
- Cycling in Spain
- Cycling in United Kingdom
  - Cycling in Cardiff
  - Cycling in Leeds
  - Cycling in London
  - Cycling in Manchester
- Cycling in United States
  - Cycling in California
    - Cycling in Los Angeles
    - Cycling in San Francisco
    - Cycling in San Jose, California
  - Cycling in Georgia
    - Cycling in Atlanta
  - Cycling in Illinois
    - Cycling in Chicago
  - Cycling in Massachusetts
    - Cycling in Boston
  - Cycling in Michigan
    - Cycling in Detroit
  - Cycling in Minnesota
    - Cycling in Atlanta
  - Cycling in New York
    - Cycling in New York City
  - Cycling in Oregon
    - Cycling in Portland, Oregon

== Cycling in the media ==
- International Cycling Film Festival
- List of films about bicycles and cycling

== Cycling movements ==
- Bike bus (Bike train) - Escorted group of cyclists in an urban environment for transportation safely, and often as student transport.
- Critical Mass – cycling event typically held on the last Friday of every month in over 300 cities around the world.

== Cycling clubs and organisations ==
=== Cycling clubs ===
- Bicycle infantry
- Bicycle Network
- British Cycling
- Cycling club
- Cycling Embassy of Denmark
- Cycling Time Trials
- Cyclists' Touring Club
- Danish Cycling Federation
- Danish Cyclists Federation
- Équipe Cycliste Cascades
- International Human Powered Vehicle Association
- International Mountain Bicycling Association
- London Cycling Campaign
- National Off-Road Bicycle Association (NORBA)
- Rails-to-Trails Conservancy
- Toronto Bicycling Network

=== Cycling organisations ===
- Critical Mass – cycling event typically held on the last Friday of every month in over 300 cities around the world.
- San Jose Bike Party
- Warm Showers – a hospitality exchange service and organization for cycle travelers.

== History of cycling ==
- History of cycling

=== History of road cycling ===
- 2004 in men's road cycling
- 2004 in women's road cycling
- 2005 in men's road cycling
- 2005 in women's road cycling
- 2006 in women's road cycling
- 2007 in men's road cycling
- 2007 in women's road cycling
- 2008 in men's road cycling
- 2007 in women's road cycling
- 2009 in men's road cycling
- 2009 in women's road cycling
- 2010 in men's road cycling
- 2010 in women's road cycling
- 2011 in men's road cycling
- 2011 in women's road cycling
- 2012 in men's road cycling
- 2012 in women's road cycling
- 2013 in men's road cycling
- 2013 in women's road cycling
- 2014 in men's road cycling
- 2014 in women's road cycling
- 2015 in men's road cycling
- 2015 in women's road cycling
- 2016 in men's road cycling
- 2016 in women's road cycling
- 2017 in men's road cycling
- 2017 in women's road cycling
- 2018 in men's road cycling
- 2018 in women's road cycling
- 2019 in men's road cycling
- 2019 in women's road cycling
- 2020 in men's road cycling
- 2020 in women's road cycling
- 2021 in men's road cycling
- 2021 in women's road cycling
- 2022 in men's road cycling
- 2022 in women's road cycling

=== History of cycling at the Summer Olympics ===
- Cycling at the 1896 Summer Olympics
- Cycling at the 1896 Summer Olympics – Men's 100 kilometres
- Cycling at the 1896 Summer Olympics – Men's 10 kilometres
- Cycling at the 1896 Summer Olympics – Men's 12 hour race
- Cycling at the 1896 Summer Olympics – Men's road race
- Cycling at the 1896 Summer Olympics – Men's sprint
- Cycling at the 1896 Summer Olympics – Men's time trial
- Cycling at the 1900 Summer Olympics
- Cycling at the 1900 Summer Olympics – Men's 25 kilometres
- Cycling at the 1900 Summer Olympics – Men's sprint
- Cycling at the 1904 Summer Olympics
- Cycling at the 1904 Summer Olympics – 1/2 mile
- Cycling at the 1904 Summer Olympics – 1/3 mile
- Cycling at the 1904 Summer Olympics – 1/4 mile
- Cycling at the 1904 Summer Olympics – 1 mile
- Cycling at the 1904 Summer Olympics – 25 miles
- Cycling at the 1904 Summer Olympics – 2 miles
- Cycling at the 1904 Summer Olympics – 5 miles
- Cycling at the 1908 Summer Olympics
- Cycling at the 1908 Summer Olympics – Men's 100 kilometres
- Cycling at the 1908 Summer Olympics – Men's 20 kilometres
- Cycling at the 1908 Summer Olympics – Men's 5000 metres
- Cycling at the 1908 Summer Olympics – Men's 660 yards
- Cycling at the 1908 Summer Olympics – Men's sprint
- Cycling at the 1908 Summer Olympics – Men's tandem
- Cycling at the 1908 Summer Olympics – Men's team pursuit
- Cycling at the 1912 Summer Olympics
- Cycling at the 1912 Summer Olympics – Men's individual time trial
- Cycling at the 1912 Summer Olympics – Men's team time trial
- Cycling at the 1920 Summer Olympics
- Cycling at the 1920 Summer Olympics – Men's 50 kilometres
- Cycling at the 1920 Summer Olympics – Men's individual time trial
- Cycling at the 1920 Summer Olympics – Men's sprint
- Cycling at the 1920 Summer Olympics – Men's tandem
- Cycling at the 1920 Summer Olympics – Men's team pursuit
- Cycling at the 1920 Summer Olympics – Men's team time trial
- Cycling at the 1924 Summer Olympics
- Cycling at the 1924 Summer Olympics – Men's 50 kilometres
- Cycling at the 1924 Summer Olympics – Men's individual time trial
- Cycling at the 1924 Summer Olympics – Men's sprint
- Cycling at the 1924 Summer Olympics – Men's tandem
- Cycling at the 1924 Summer Olympics – Men's team pursuit
- Cycling at the 1924 Summer Olympics – Men's team time trial
- Cycling at the 1928 Summer Olympics
- Cycling at the 1928 Summer Olympics – Men's tandem
- Cycling at the 1932 Summer Olympics
- Cycling at the 1932 Summer Olympics – Men's 1000 m time trial
- Cycling at the 1932 Summer Olympics – Men's individual road race
- Cycling at the 1932 Summer Olympics – Men's sprint
- Cycling at the 1932 Summer Olympics – Men's tandem
- Cycling at the 1932 Summer Olympics – Men's team pursuit
- Cycling at the 1932 Summer Olympics – Men's team road race
- Cycling at the 1936 Summer Olympics
- Cycling at the 1948 Summer Olympics
- Cycling at the 1952 Summer Olympics
- Cycling at the 1952 Summer Olympics – Men's 1000 m time trial
- Cycling at the 1952 Summer Olympics – Men's individual road race
- Cycling at the 1952 Summer Olympics – Men's sprint
- Cycling at the 1952 Summer Olympics – Men's tandem
- Cycling at the 1952 Summer Olympics – Men's team pursuit
- Cycling at the 1952 Summer Olympics – Men's team road race
- Cycling at the 1956 Summer Olympics
- Cycling at the 1956 Summer Olympics – Men's 1000 m time trial
- Cycling at the 1956 Summer Olympics – Men's individual road race
- Cycling at the 1956 Summer Olympics – Men's sprint
- Cycling at the 1956 Summer Olympics – Men's tandem
- Cycling at the 1956 Summer Olympics – Men's team pursuit
- Cycling at the 1956 Summer Olympics – Men's team road race
- Cycling at the 1960 Summer Olympics
- Cycling at the 1964 Summer Olympics
- Cycling at the 1964 Summer Olympics – Men's 1000m time trial
- Cycling at the 1964 Summer Olympics – Men's individual pursuit
- Cycling at the 1964 Summer Olympics – Men's individual road race
- Cycling at the 1964 Summer Olympics – Men's sprint
- Cycling at the 1964 Summer Olympics – Men's tandem
- Cycling at the 1964 Summer Olympics – Men's team pursuit
- Cycling at the 1964 Summer Olympics – Men's team time trial
- Cycling at the 1968 Summer Olympics
- Cycling at the 1972 Summer Olympics
- Cycling at the 1972 Summer Olympics – Men's 1000m time trial
- Cycling at the 1972 Summer Olympics – Men's individual road race
- Cycling at the 1972 Summer Olympics – Men's tandem
- Cycling at the 1976 Summer Olympics
- Cycling at the 1976 Summer Olympics – Men's 1000m time trial
- Cycling at the 1976 Summer Olympics – Men's individual pursuit
- Cycling at the 1976 Summer Olympics – Men's individual road race
- Cycling at the 1976 Summer Olympics – Men's sprint
- Cycling at the 1976 Summer Olympics – Men's team pursuit
- Cycling at the 1980 Summer Olympics
- Cycling at the 1980 Summer Olympics – Men's individual road race
- Cycling at the 1984 Summer Olympics
- Cycling at the 1984 Summer Olympics – Men's individual road race
- Cycling at the 1984 Summer Olympics – Men's points race
- Cycling at the 1984 Summer Olympics – Women's individual road race
- Cycling at the 1984 Summer Paralympics
- Cycling at the 1988 Summer Olympics
- Cycling at the 1988 Summer Olympics – Men's individual road race
- Cycling at the 1988 Summer Olympics – Men's points race
- Cycling at the 1988 Summer Olympics – Women's road race
- Cycling at the 1992 Summer Olympics
- Cycling at the 1992 Summer Olympics – Men's individual pursuit
- Cycling at the 1992 Summer Olympics – Men's individual road race
- Cycling at the 1992 Summer Olympics – Men's points race
- Cycling at the 1992 Summer Olympics – Men's sprint
- Cycling at the 1992 Summer Olympics – Men's team pursuit
- Cycling at the 1992 Summer Olympics – Men's team time trial
- Cycling at the 1992 Summer Olympics – Men's track time trial
- Cycling at the 1992 Summer Olympics – Women's individual pursuit
- Cycling at the 1992 Summer Olympics – Women's road race
- Cycling at the 1992 Summer Olympics – Women's sprint
- Cycling at the 1996 Summer Olympics
- Cycling at the 1996 Summer Olympics – Men's cross-country
- Cycling at the 1996 Summer Olympics – Men's points race
- Cycling at the 1996 Summer Olympics – Men's individual road race
- Cycling at the 1996 Summer Olympics – Men's time trial
- Cycling at the 1996 Summer Olympics – Women's cross-country
- Cycling at the 1996 Summer Olympics – Women's road race
- Cycling at the 1996 Summer Olympics – Women's time trial
- Cycling at the 2000 Summer Olympics
- Cycling at the 2000 Summer Olympics – Men's keirin
- Cycling at the 2000 Summer Olympics – Men's Madison
- Cycling at the 2000 Summer Olympics – Men's cross-country
- Cycling at the 2000 Summer Olympics – Men's individual pursuit
- Cycling at the 2000 Summer Olympics – Men's points race
- Cycling at the 2000 Summer Olympics – Men's individual road race
- Cycling at the 2000 Summer Olympics – Men's road time trial
- Cycling at the 2000 Summer Olympics – Men's sprint
- Cycling at the 2000 Summer Olympics – Men's team pursuit
- Cycling at the 2000 Summer Olympics – Men's team sprint
- Cycling at the 2000 Summer Olympics – Men's track time trial
- Cycling at the 2000 Summer Olympics – Women's cross-country
- Cycling at the 2000 Summer Olympics – Women's individual pursuit
- Cycling at the 2000 Summer Olympics – Women's points race
- Cycling at the 2000 Summer Olympics – Women's individual road race
- Cycling at the 2000 Summer Olympics – Women's road time trial
- Cycling at the 2000 Summer Olympics – Women's sprint
- Cycling at the 2000 Summer Olympics – Women's track time trial
- Cycling at the 2004 Summer Olympics
- Cycling at the 2004 Summer Olympics – Men's keirin
- Cycling at the 2004 Summer Olympics – Men's Madison
- Cycling at the 2004 Summer Olympics – Men's cross-country
- Cycling at the 2004 Summer Olympics – Men's individual pursuit
- Cycling at the 2004 Summer Olympics – Men's points race
- Cycling at the 2004 Summer Olympics – Men's individual road race
- Cycling at the 2004 Summer Olympics – Men's road time trial
- Cycling at the 2004 Summer Olympics – Men's sprint
- Cycling at the 2004 Summer Olympics – Men's team pursuit
- Cycling at the 2004 Summer Olympics – Men's team sprint
- Cycling at the 2004 Summer Olympics – Men's track time trial
- Cycling at the 2004 Summer Olympics – Women's cross-country
- Cycling at the 2004 Summer Olympics – Women's individual pursuit
- Cycling at the 2004 Summer Olympics – Women's points race
- Cycling at the 2004 Summer Olympics – Women's individual road race
- Cycling at the 2004 Summer Olympics – Women's road time trial
- Cycling at the 2004 Summer Olympics – Women's sprint
- Cycling at the 2004 Summer Olympics – Women's track time trial
- Cycling at the 2008 Summer Olympics
- Cycling at the 2008 Summer Olympics – Men's BMX
- Cycling at the 2008 Summer Olympics – Men's keirin
- Cycling at the 2008 Summer Olympics – Men's Madison
- Cycling at the 2008 Summer Olympics – Men's cross-country
- Cycling at the 2008 Summer Olympics – Men's individual pursuit
- Cycling at the 2008 Summer Olympics – Men's points race
- Cycling at the 2008 Summer Olympics – Men's individual road race
- Cycling at the 2008 Summer Olympics – Men's road time trial
- Cycling at the 2008 Summer Olympics – Men's sprint
- Cycling at the 2008 Summer Olympics – Men's team pursuit
- Cycling at the 2008 Summer Olympics – Men's team sprint
- Cycling at the 2008 Summer Olympics – Qualification
- Cycling at the 2008 Summer Olympics – Women's BMX
- Cycling at the 2008 Summer Olympics – Women's cross-country
- Cycling at the 2008 Summer Olympics – Women's individual pursuit
- Cycling at the 2008 Summer Olympics – Women's points race
- Cycling at the 2008 Summer Olympics – Women's individual road race
- Cycling at the 2008 Summer Olympics – Women's road time trial
- Cycling at the 2008 Summer Olympics – Women's sprint
- Cycling at the 2012 Summer Olympics
- Cycling at the 2012 Summer Olympics – Men's individual road race
- Cycling at the 2012 Summer Olympics – Qualification
- Cycling at the 2012 Summer Olympics – Women's individual road race

=== History of cycling at the Pan American Games ===
- Cycling at the 1951 Pan American Games
- Cycling at the 1955 Pan American Games
- Cycling at the 1959 Pan American Games
- Cycling at the 1963 Pan American Games
- Cycling at the 1967 Pan American Games
- Cycling at the 1971 Pan American Games
- Cycling at the 1975 Pan American Games
- Cycling at the 1979 Pan American Games
- Cycling at the 1983 Pan American Games
- Cycling at the 1987 Pan American Games
- Cycling at the 1991 Pan American Games
- Cycling at the 1995 Pan American Games
- Cycling at the 1999 Pan American Games
- Cycling at the 2003 Pan American Games
- Cycling at the 2003 Pan American Games – Mountain Bike
- Cycling at the 2003 Pan American Games – Road Time Trial
- Cycling at the 2003 Pan American Games – Women's Road Race
- Cycling at the 2007 Pan American Games
- Cycling at the 2011 Pan American Games
- Cycling at the 2011 Pan American Games – Men's BMX
- Cycling at the 2011 Pan American Games – Men's Keirin
- Cycling at the 2011 Pan American Games – Men's Omnium
- Cycling at the 2011 Pan American Games – Men's cross-country
- Cycling at the 2011 Pan American Games – Men's road race
- Cycling at the 2011 Pan American Games – Men's road time trial
- Cycling at the 2011 Pan American Games – Men's sprint
- Cycling at the 2011 Pan American Games – Men's team pursuit
- Cycling at the 2011 Pan American Games – Men's team sprint
- Cycling at the 2011 Pan American Games – Qualification
- Cycling at the 2011 Pan American Games – Women's BMX
- Cycling at the 2011 Pan American Games – Women's Keirin
- Cycling at the 2011 Pan American Games – Women's Omnium
- Cycling at the 2011 Pan American Games – Women's cross-country
- Cycling at the 2011 Pan American Games – Women's road race
- Cycling at the 2011 Pan American Games – Women's road time trial
- Cycling at the 2011 Pan American Games – Women's sprint
- Cycling at the 2011 Pan American Games – Women's team pursuit
- Cycling at the 2011 Pan American Games – Women's team sprint

=== Other ===
- Cycling at the 1906 Intercalated Games
- Cycling at the 1951 Asian Games
- Cycling at the 1982 Commonwealth Games
- Cycling at the 1988 Summer Paralympics
- Cycling at the 2002 Asian Games
- Cycling at the 2002 Commonwealth Games
- Cycling at the 1992 Summer Paralympics
- Cycling at the 1996 Summer Paralympics
- Cycling at the 2000 Summer Paralympics
- Cycling at the 2004 Summer Paralympics
- Cycling at the 2005 Mediterranean Games
- Cycling at the 2005 Southeast Asian Games
- Cycling at the 2006 Asian Games
- Cycling at the 2006 Central American and Caribbean Games
- Cycling at the 2006 Commonwealth Games
- Cycling at the 2007 All-Africa Games
- Cycling at the 2007 Southeast Asian Games
- Cycling at the 2008 Summer Paralympics
- Cycling at the 2008 Summer Paralympics – Men's 1km time trial (B&VI 1–3)
- Cycling at the 2008 Summer Paralympics – Men's 1km time trial (LC 3–4)
- Cycling at the 2008 Summer Paralympics – Men's individual pursuit
- Cycling at the 2008 Summer Paralympics – Men's individual pursuit (B&VI 1–3)
- Cycling at the 2008 Summer Paralympics – Men's individual pursuit (CP 3)
- Cycling at the 2008 Summer Paralympics – Men's individual pursuit (CP 4)
- Cycling at the 2008 Summer Paralympics – Men's time trial
- Cycling at the 2008 Summer Paralympics – Women's 1km time trial (B&VI 1–3)
- Cycling at the 2008 Summer Paralympics – Women's time trial
- Cycling at the 2009 Southeast Asian Games
- Cycling at the 2010 Asian Games
- Cycling at the 2010 Central American and Caribbean Games
- Cycling at the 2010 Commonwealth Games
- Cycling at the 2010 Commonwealth Games – Men's 1 km time trial
- Cycling at the 2010 Commonwealth Games – Men's Keirin
- Cycling at the 2010 Commonwealth Games – Men's Scratch
- Cycling at the 2010 Commonwealth Games – Men's individual pursuit
- Cycling at the 2010 Commonwealth Games – Men's points race
- Cycling at the 2010 Commonwealth Games – Men's road race
- Cycling at the 2010 Commonwealth Games – Men's road time trial
- Cycling at the 2010 Commonwealth Games – Men's sprint
- Cycling at the 2010 Commonwealth Games – Men's team pursuit
- Cycling at the 2010 Commonwealth Games – Men's team sprint
- Cycling at the 2010 Commonwealth Games – Women's 500 m time trial
- Cycling at the 2010 Commonwealth Games – Women's Scratch
- Cycling at the 2010 Commonwealth Games – Women's individual pursuit
- Cycling at the 2010 Commonwealth Games – Women's points race
- Cycling at the 2010 Commonwealth Games – Women's road race
- Cycling at the 2010 Commonwealth Games – Women's road time trial
- Cycling at the 2010 Commonwealth Games – Women's sprint
- Cycling at the 2010 Commonwealth Games – Women's team sprint
- Cycling at the 2010 South American Games
- Cycling at the 2010 South American Games – Men's 1 kilometre time trial
- Cycling at the 2010 South American Games – Men's BMX 20 inches wheel
- Cycling at the 2010 South American Games – Men's BMX 24 inches wheel
- Cycling at the 2010 South American Games – Men's Keirin
- Cycling at the 2010 South American Games – Men's Madison
- Cycling at the 2010 South American Games – Men's Omnium
- Cycling at the 2010 South American Games – Men's cross-country
- Cycling at the 2010 South American Games – Men's individual pursuit
- Cycling at the 2010 South American Games – Men's points race
- Cycling at the 2010 South American Games – Men's road race
- Cycling at the 2010 South American Games – Men's road time trial
- Cycling at the 2010 South American Games – Men's scratch race
- Cycling at the 2010 South American Games – Men's sprint
- Cycling at the 2010 South American Games – Men's team pursuit
- Cycling at the 2010 South American Games – Men's team sprint
- Cycling at the 2010 South American Games – Women's 500 metres time trial
- Cycling at the 2010 South American Games – Women's BMX 20 inches wheel
- Cycling at the 2010 South American Games – Women's BMX 24 inches wheel
- Cycling at the 2010 South American Games – Women's Keirin
- Cycling at the 2010 South American Games – Women's cross-country
- Cycling at the 2010 South American Games – Women's individual pursuit
- Cycling at the 2010 South American Games – Women's points race
- Cycling at the 2010 South American Games – Women's road race
- Cycling at the 2010 South American Games – Women's road time trial
- Cycling at the 2010 South American Games – Women's scratch race
- Cycling at the 2010 South American Games – Women's sprint
- Cycling at the 2010 South American Games – Women's team pursuit
- Cycling at the 2010 South American Games – Women's team sprint
- Cycling at the 2010 South Asian Games
- Cycling at the 2010 Summer Youth Olympics
- Cycling at the 2010 Summer Youth Olympics – Boys' BMX
- Cycling at the 2010 Summer Youth Olympics – Boys' cross country
- Cycling at the 2010 Summer Youth Olympics – Boys' road race
- Cycling at the 2010 Summer Youth Olympics – Boys' time trial
- Cycling at the 2010 Summer Youth Olympics – Combined mixed team
- Cycling at the 2010 Summer Youth Olympics – Girls' BMX
- Cycling at the 2010 Summer Youth Olympics – Girls' cross country
- Cycling at the 2010 Summer Youth Olympics – Girls' time trial
- Cycling at the 2011 All-Africa Games
- Cycling at the 2011 Commonwealth Youth Games
- Cycling at the 2011 European Youth Summer Olympic Festival
- Cycling at the 2011 Games of the Small States of Europe
- Cycling at the 2011 Island Games
- Cycling at the 2011 Pan Arab Games
- Cycling at the 2011 Parapan American Games
- Cycling at the 2011 Southeast Asian Games
- Cycling at the 2011 Summer Universiade
- Cycling at the 2011 Summer Universiade – Men's road race
- Cycling at the 2011 Summer Universiade – Women's road race
- Cycling at the All-Africa Games
- Cycling at the Asian Games
- Cycling at the Commonwealth Games
- Cycling at the Friendship Games

== Notable cyclists ==
- List of cyclists
- Jacques Anquetil
- Lance Armstrong
- Federico Bahamontes
- Gino Bartali
- Louison Bobet
- Ottavio Bottecchia
- Lucien Buysse
- Alberto Contador
- Fausto Coppi
- Henri Cornet
- Maurice De Waele
- Odile Defraye
- Pedro Delgado
- Cadel Evans
- François Faber
- Laurent Fignon
- Nicolas Frantz
- Chris Froome
- Maurice Garin
- Gustave Garrigou
- Charly Gaul
- Felice Gimondi
- Bernard Hinault
- Miguel Indurain
- Jan Janssen
- Hugo Koblet
- Ferdinand Kübler
- Firmin Lambot
- Roger Lapébie
- Octave Lapize
- André Leducq
- Greg LeMond
- Jeannie Longo
- Romain Maes
- Antonin Magne
- Eddy Merckx
- Gastone Nencini
- Manfred Nepp
- Vincenzo Nibali
- Luis Ocaña
- Marco Pantani
- Henri Pélissier
- Óscar Pereiro
- Lucien Petit-Breton
- Roger Pingeon
- René Pottier
- Bjarne Riis
- Jean Robic
- Stephen Roche
- Carlos Sastre
- Andy Schleck
- Léon Scieur
- Georges Speicher
- Major Taylor
- Bernard Thévenet
- Philippe Thys
- Louis Trousselier
- Jan Ullrich
- Lucien Van Impe
- Marianne Vos
- Roger Walkowiak
- Bradley Wiggins
- Joop Zoetemelk

== See also ==
- Alleycat race
- Bicycle and motorcycle dynamics
- Bicycle and motorcycle geometry
- Bicycle basket
- Bicycle culture
- Bicycle fairing
- Bicycle fender
- Bicycle gearing
- Bicycle locker
- Bicycle messenger
- Bicycle parking station
- Bicycle performance
- Bicycle racing
  - Road bicycle racing
- Bicycle touring
- Cadence (cycling)
- Critical Mass
- Cyclability
- Cycle sport
- Cycling advocacy
- Cycling advocacy (aka Cycling activism)
- Cycling at the Summer Olympics
- Cycling at the Summer Paralympics
- Cycling demonstration towns
- Cycling domestique
- Cycling power meter
- Cycling records
- Effective Cycling
- Eurobike
- Freeride mountain-biking movies
- Glossary of cycling
- Hillclimbing
- History of cycling
- History of the bicycle
- HPV Racing, Victoria Australia
- Human-powered transport
- Icetrack cycling
- Indoor cycling
- John Forester, engineer and bicycle transportation advocate
- List of Antarctic cycling expeditions
- List of bicycle and human powered vehicle museums
- List of bicycle manufacturers
- List of bicycle part manufacturers
- List of bicycle parts
- List of bicycle sharing systems
- List of bicycle types
- List of cycleways
- List of cycling tracks and velodromes
- List of doping cases in cycling
- List of electric bicycle brands and manufacturers
- List of films about bicycles and cycling
- List of important cycling events
- List of Japanese bicycle brands and manufacturers
- List of professional cyclists who died during a race
- List of rail trails
- List of songs about bicycles
- Mixed Terrain Cycle-Touring
- Modal share
- Mountain biking
  - Downhill mountain biking
  - Enduro (mountain biking)
  - Mountain bike orienteering
  - Mountain unicycling
- Outline of bicycles
- Outline of motorcycles and motorcycling
- Pacific Blue, a TV series about a team of bike police officers
- Para-cycling classification
- Randonneuring
- Road cycling
- Skirt guard
- Supermarket Street Sweep
- Tweed Run
- Ultra-distance cycling
- Underwater cycling
- Unicycle
- Utility cycling
- Vehicular cycling
- Velo Vision
  - Six-day racing
- World Naked Bike Ride
  - Clothing-optional bike ride
