= Cycling in North Korea =

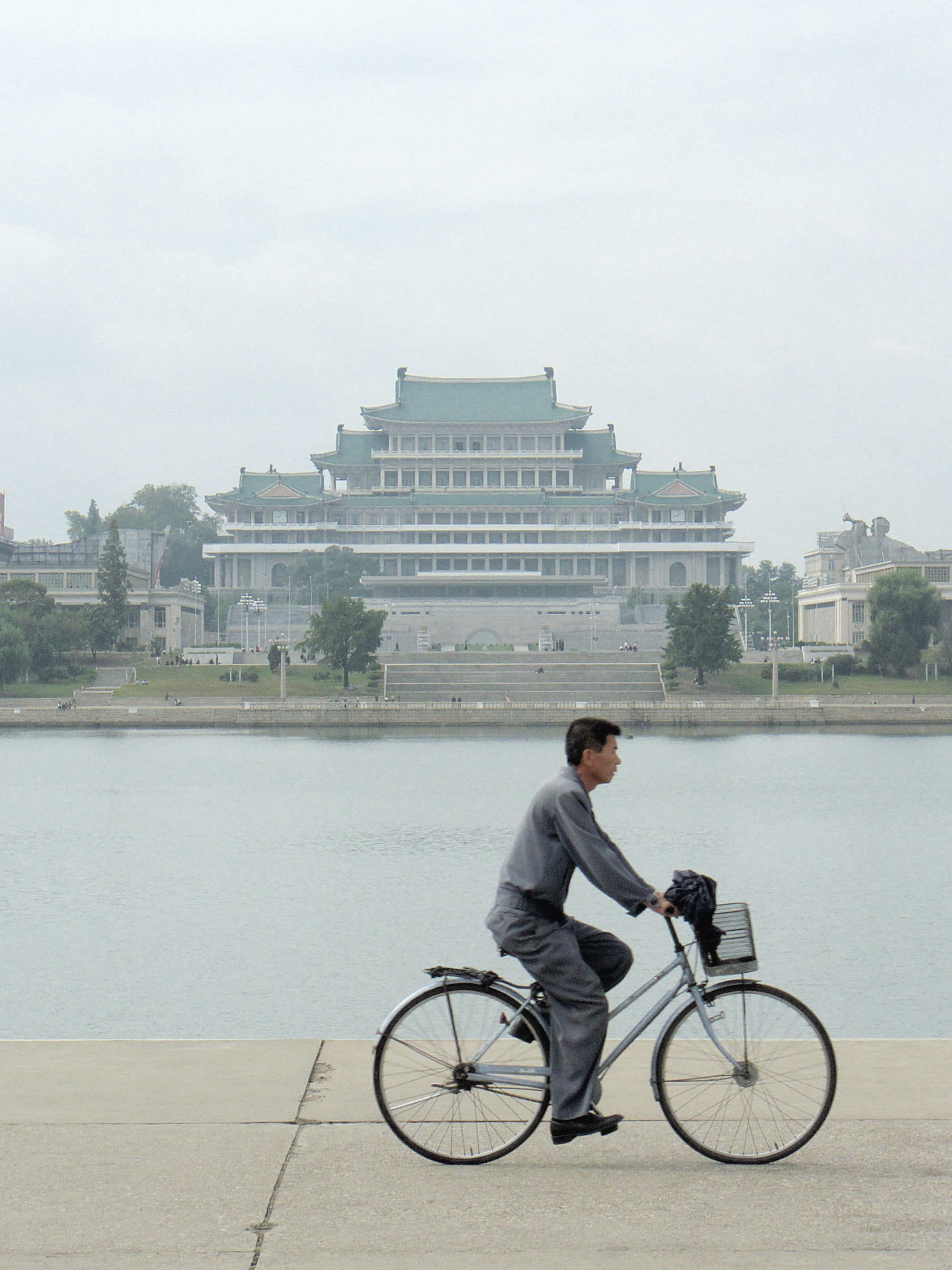
A man riding a bicycle along the Taedong River in Pyongyang, 2008

Cycling has become a common mode of transport in North Korea since its economic transition in the early 1990s.

A ban on bicycles in the country's capital and largest city, Pyongyang, in existence for decades, was suddenly lifted in 1992, and according to Andrei Lankov, bicycles have since "proliferated" and their use has "visibly increased" in other urban areas. However, their price, meager by international standards, still puts them out of reach of a significant portion of the populace. A modest infrastructure, including bicycle lanes and bicycle parking, has likewise developed. Foreign and domestic bicycles are available, with used Japanese models particularly coveted.

Cyclists must reportedly obtain a license by passing a road safety test, and must register bicycles and display a corresponding tag as proof, though the law is often flouted outside the capital. Conflicting reports exist that women are, or have been, banned from riding bicycles, with some claiming the ban to be a personal edict of Kim Jong-il; however, female cyclists are a common sight in North Korea's large cities, indicating this law, too, if it ever existed, is widely ignored.

== Ryomyong bicycle-sharing ==
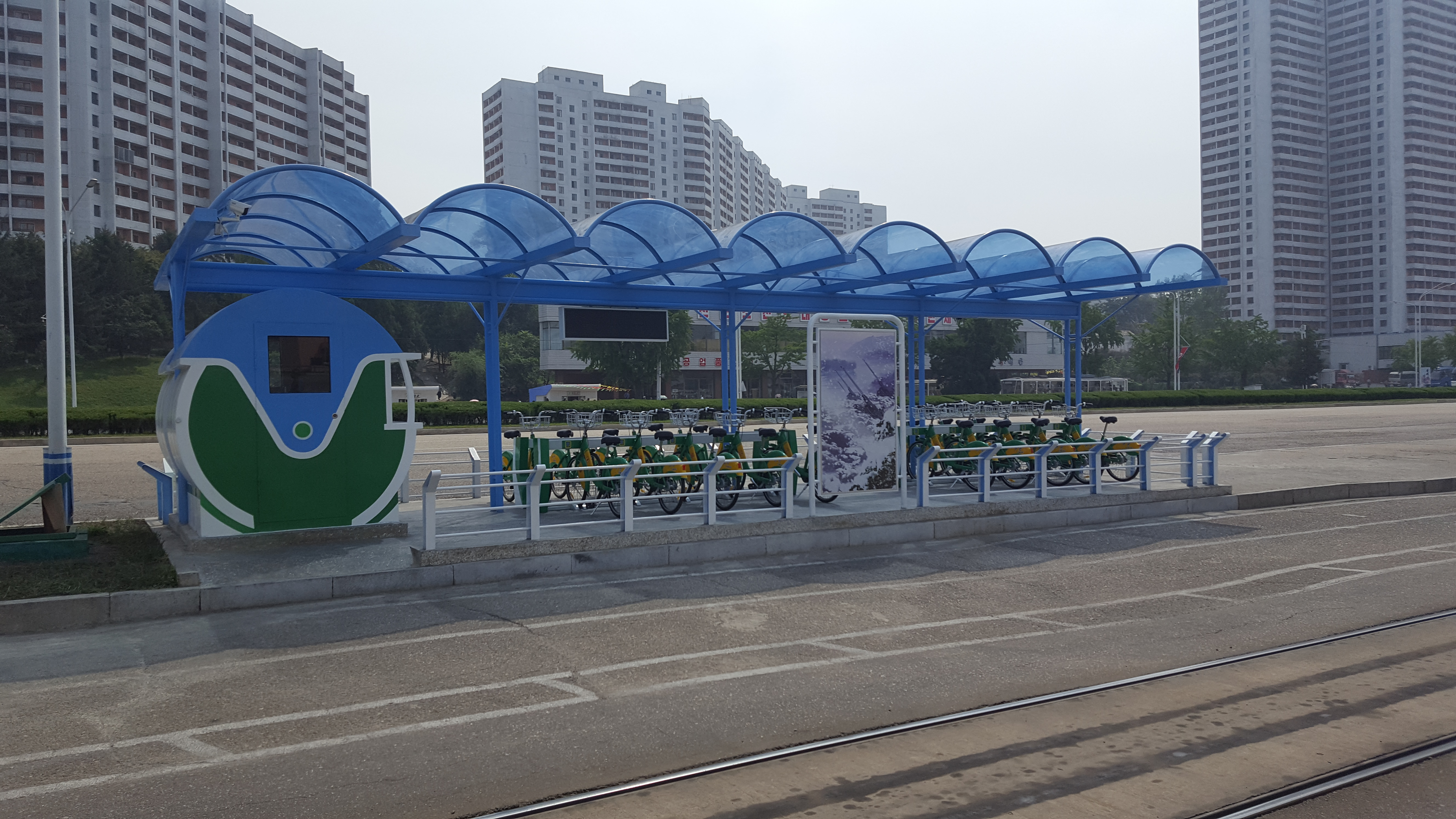
A station of Pyongyang's bicycle-sharing system

In 2017, Tongil News reported the introduction of a bicycle-sharing system in Pyongyang, called Ryomyong (려명 "Dawn"), sharing photographs from the Russian embassy. The Pyongyang Times later published photographs of stations, reporting that the system is overseen by the Pyongyang Bicycle Rental Office (평양자전거임대관리소), with bicycles manufactured domestically by a North Korean/Chinese joint venture, Phyongjin Bicycle Cooperative Company (평진자전거합영회사), located in Sosong district (서성구역). Reservations may be made for 50 won per minute with a stored-value card at one of five locations on Kwangbok Street in the city's scenic Mangyongdae district.

== Gallery ==
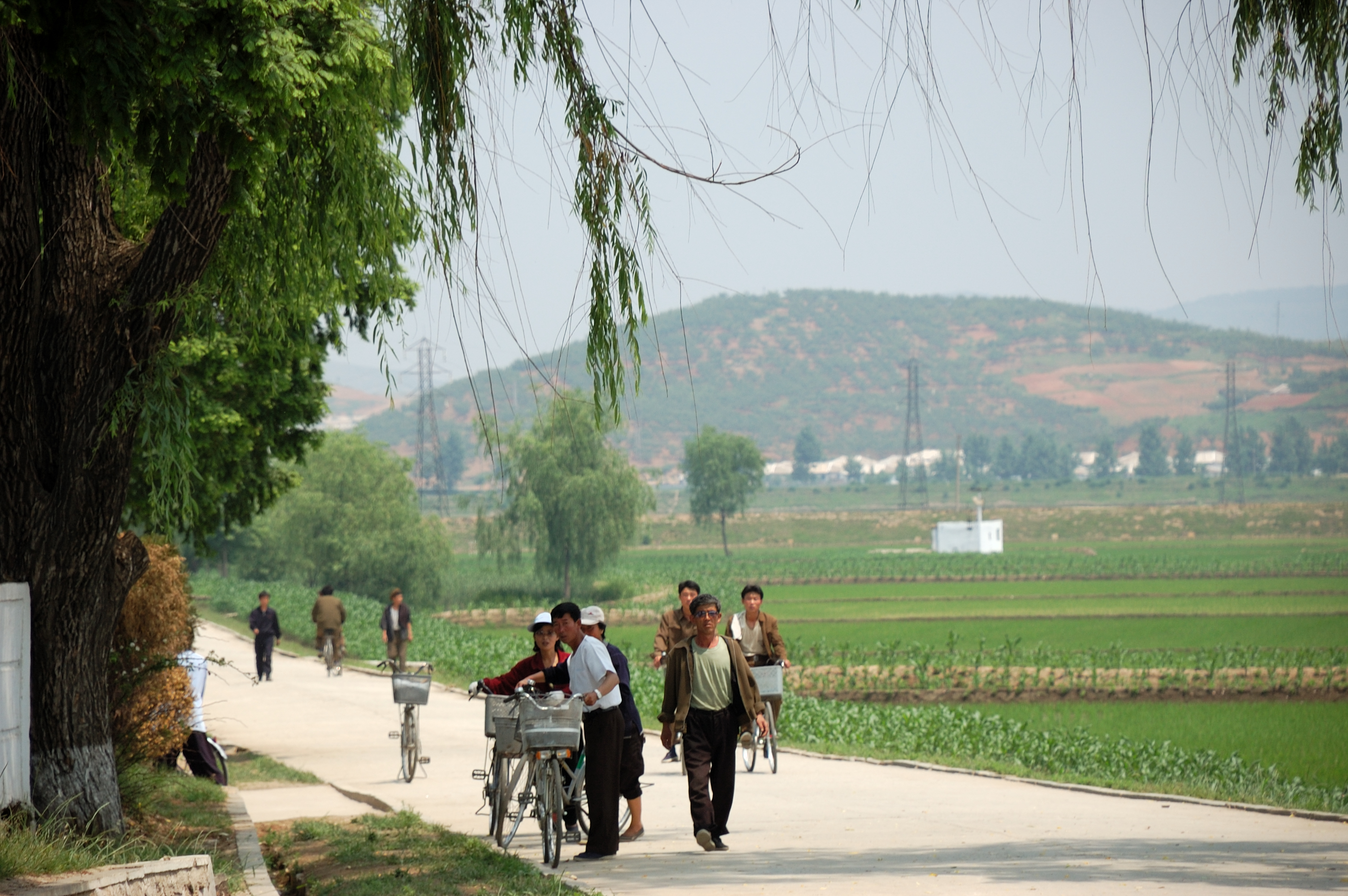
Cyclists in Chongsan-ri, Kangso, 2008

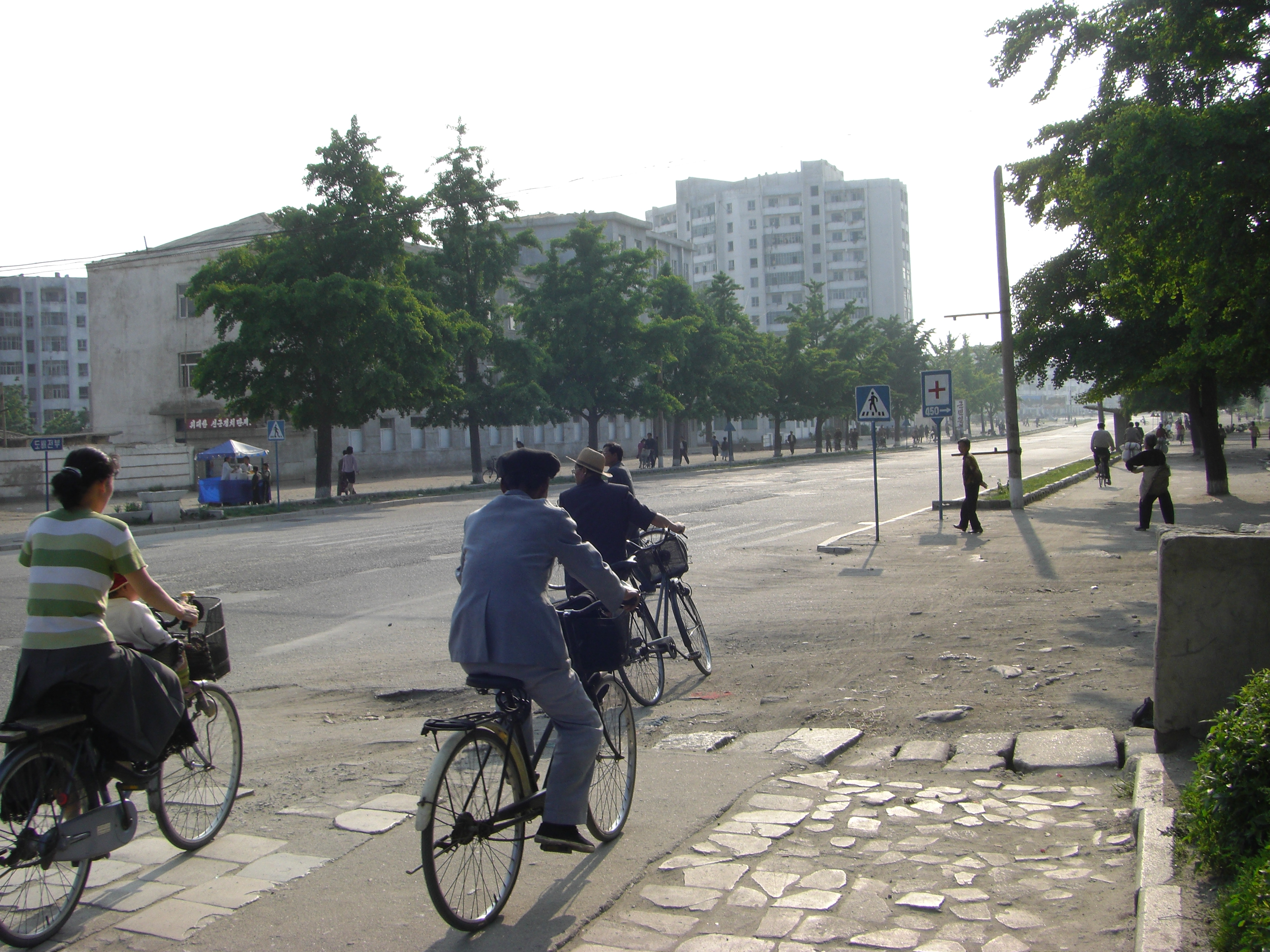
Cyclists in Haeju, 2008

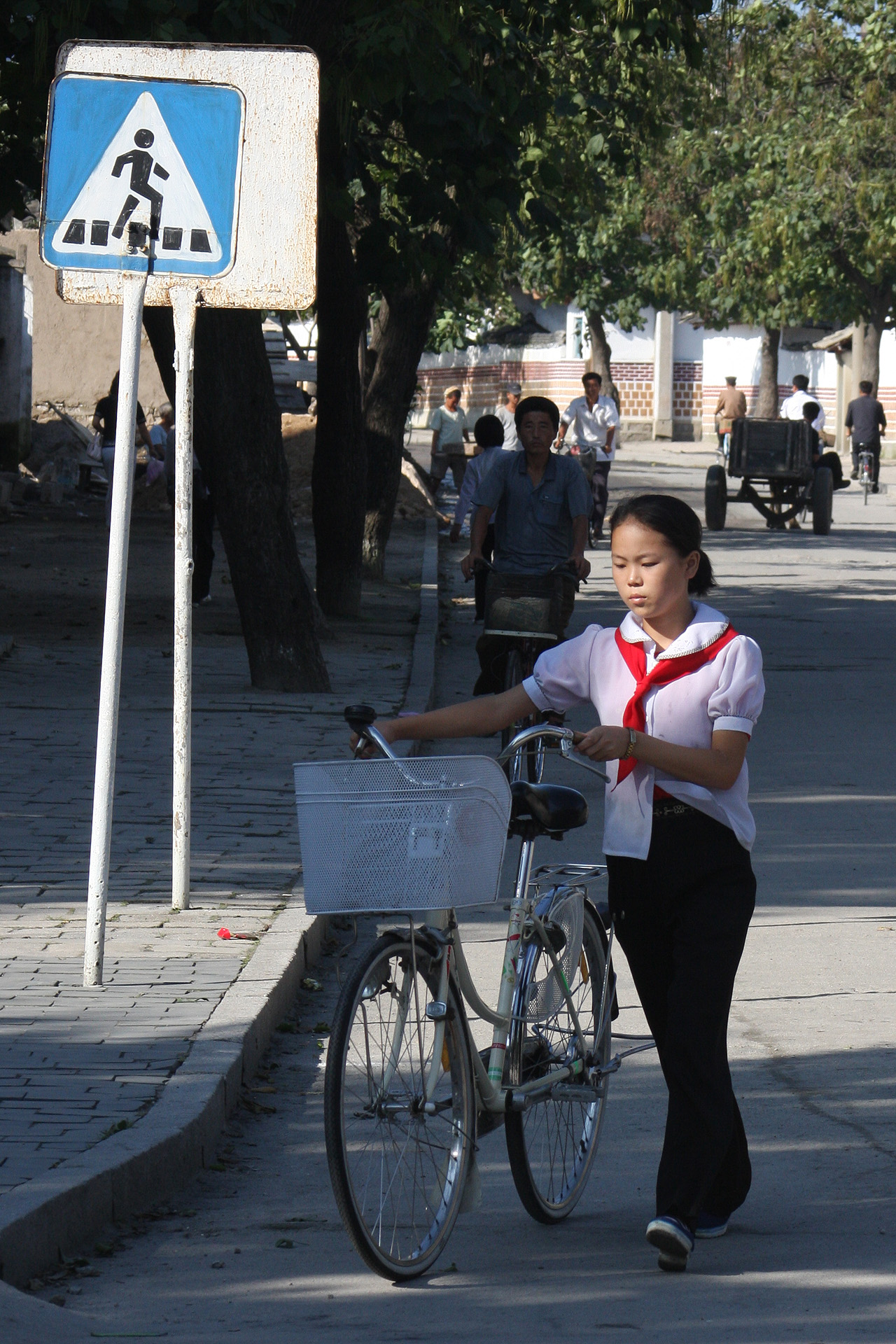
Young woman with bicycle, Kaesong, 2010

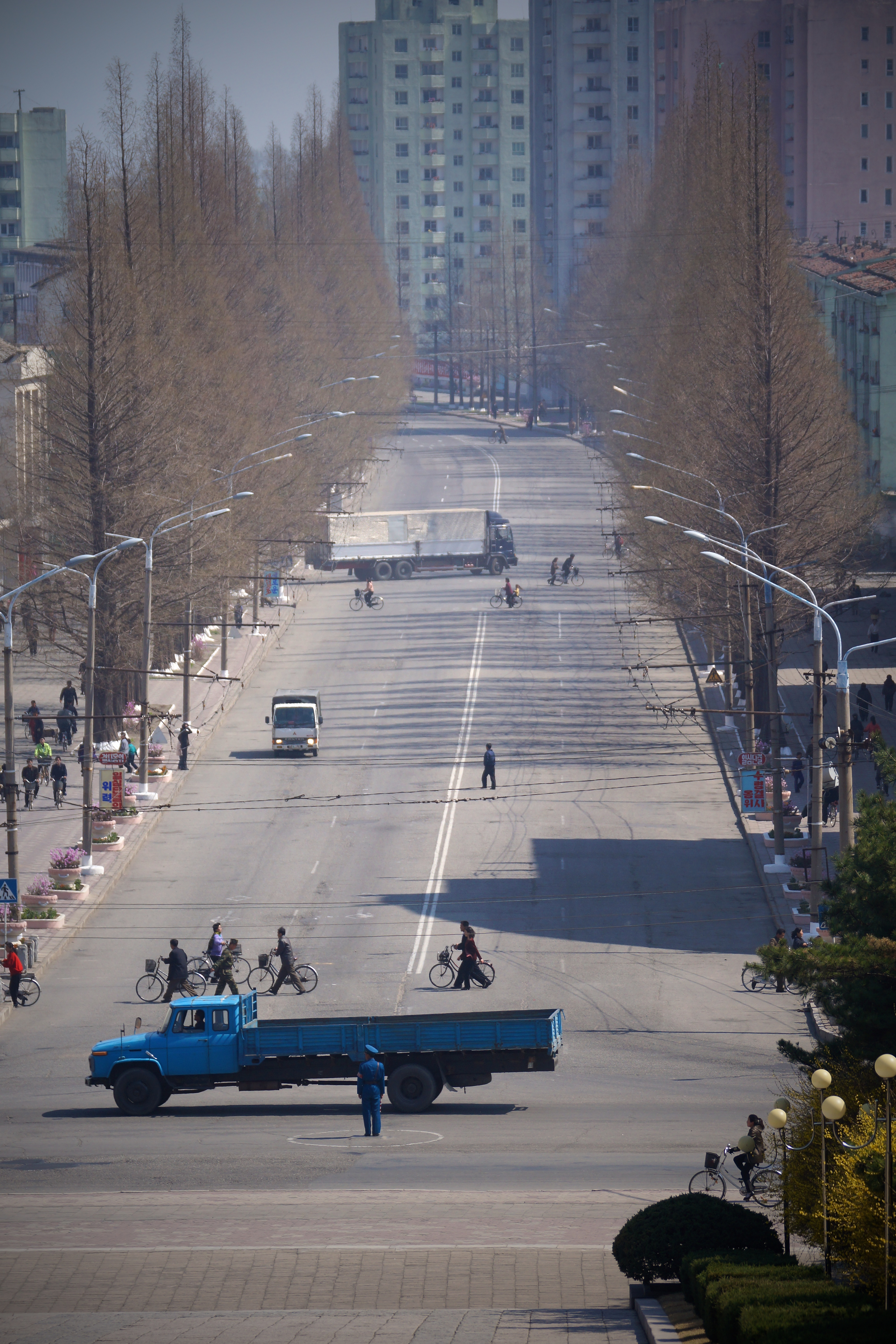
Bicycles crossing a street, Hamhung, 2012

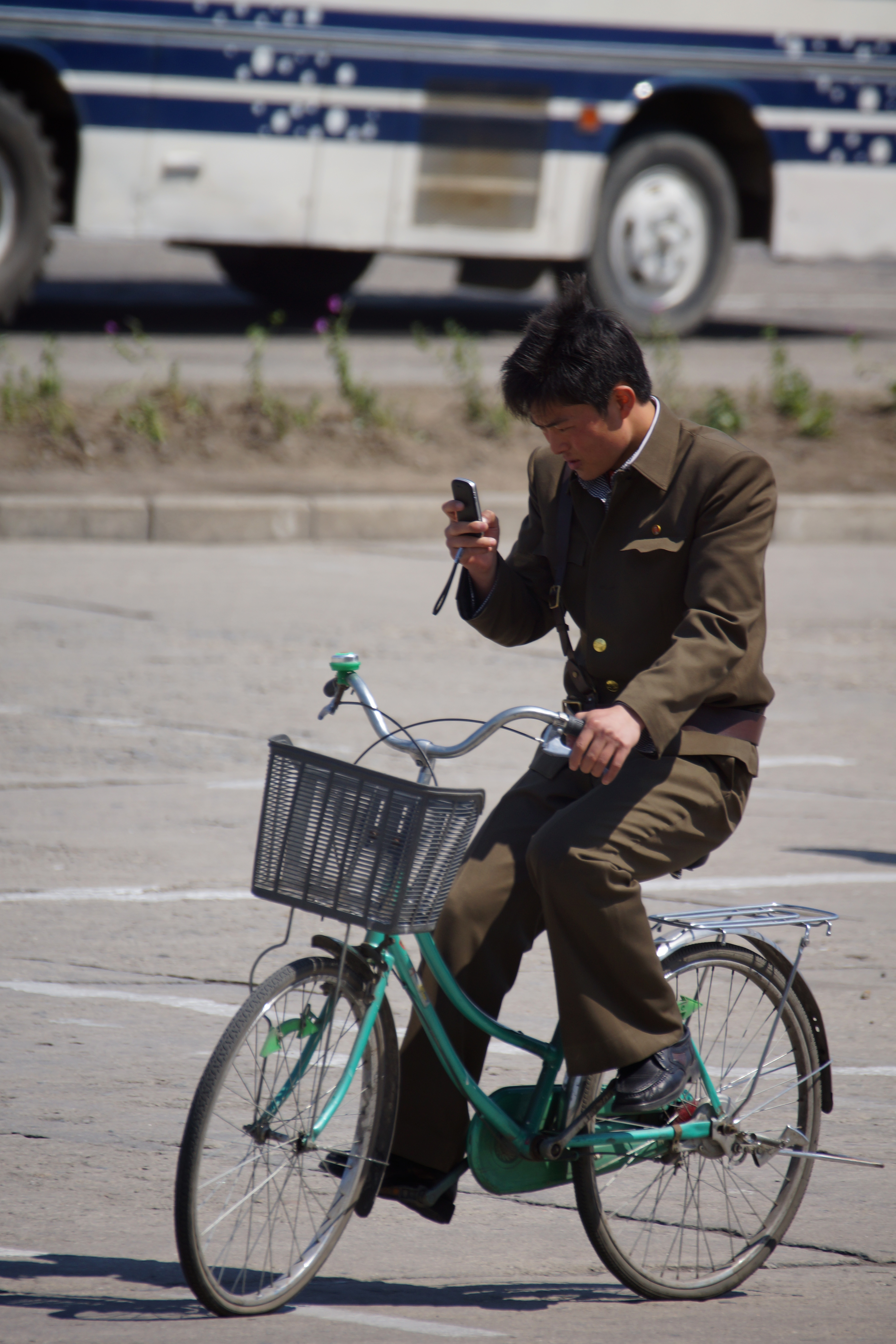
Cyclist using a mobile phone, Hamhung, 2012

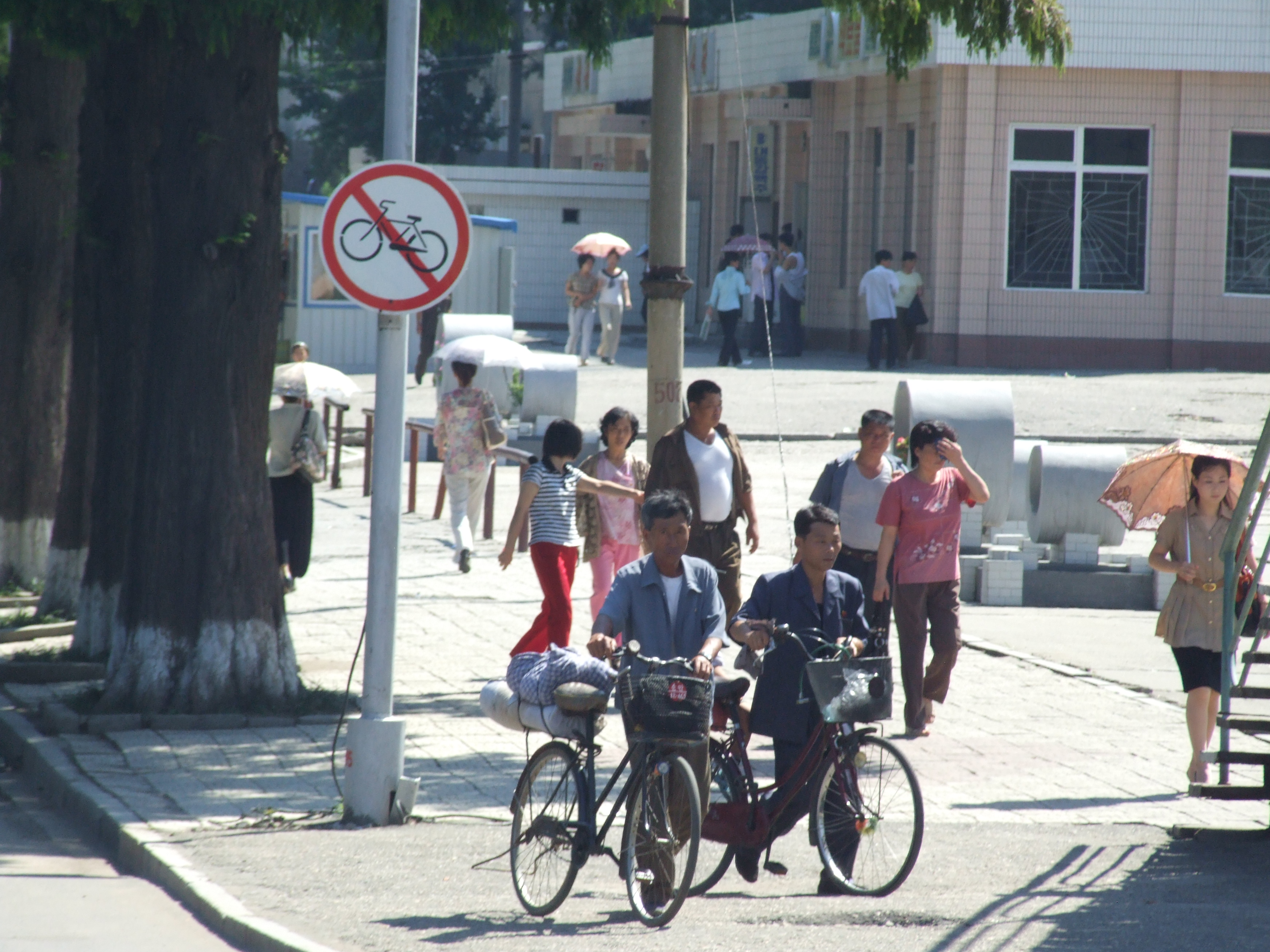
Bicycles with visible North Korean registration plates in Pyongyang, 2012

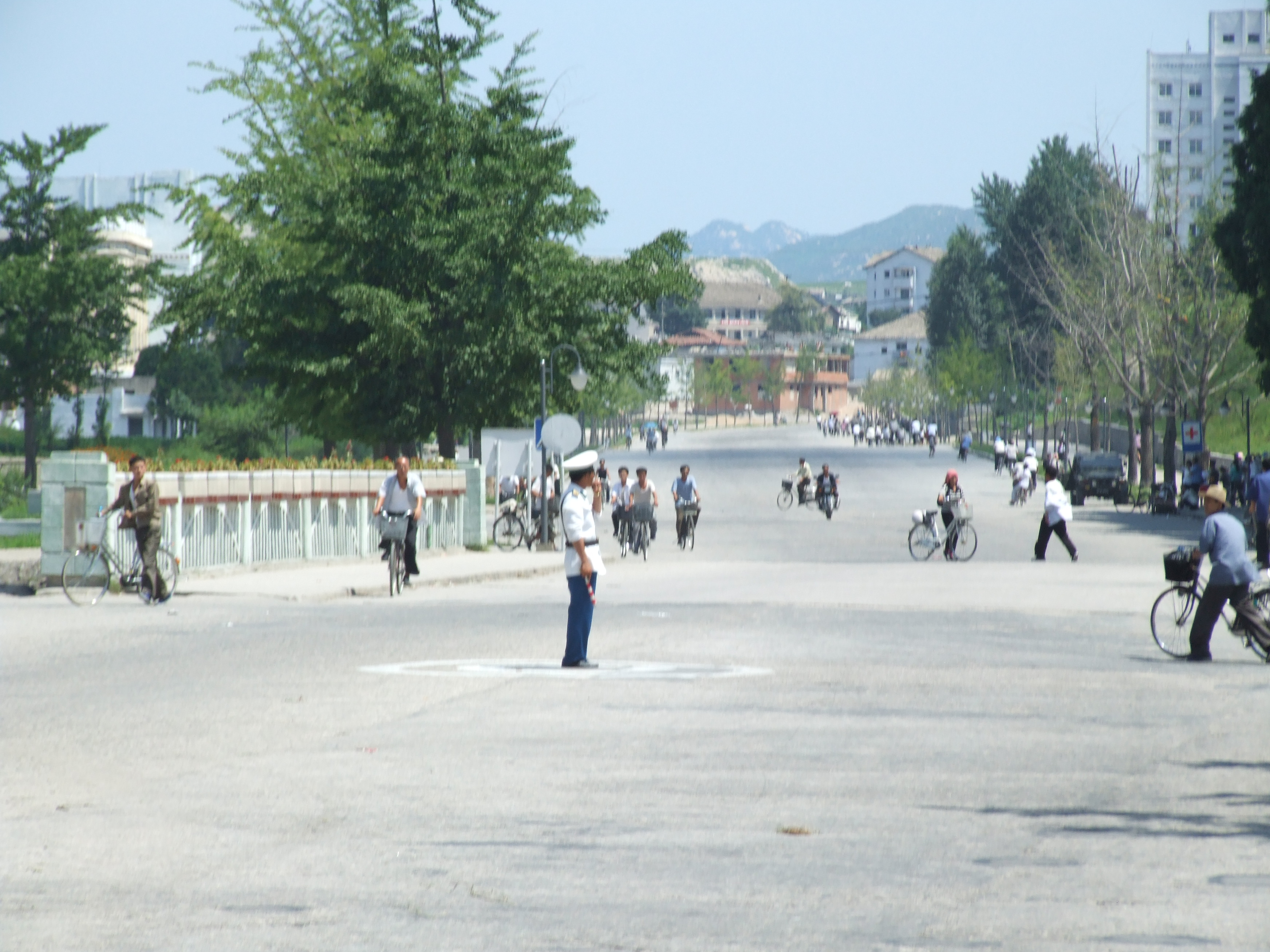
Morning bicycle traffic in Kaesong, 2012

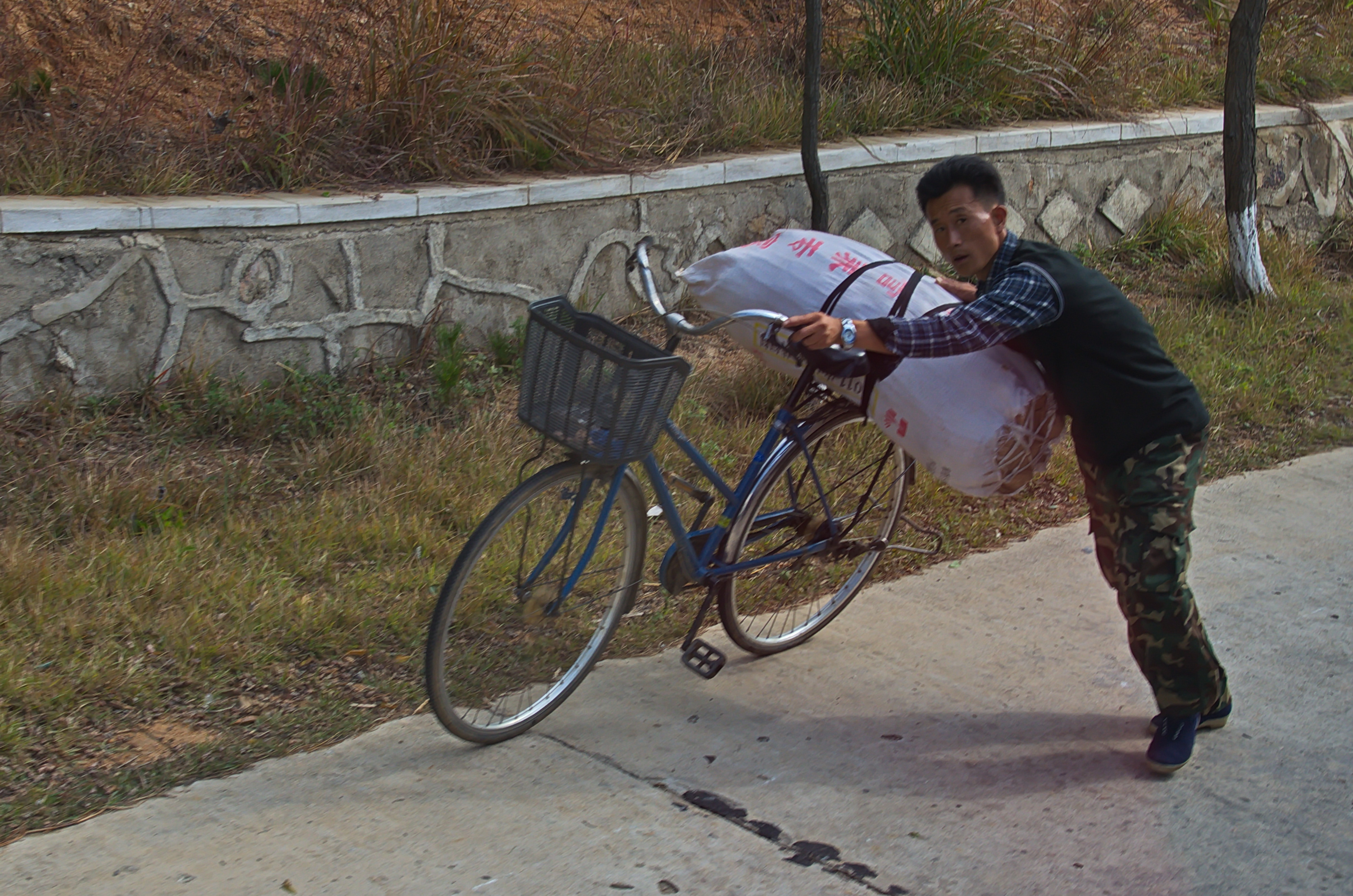
Cyclist transporting cargo along the Kaesong-Nampo motorway, 2015

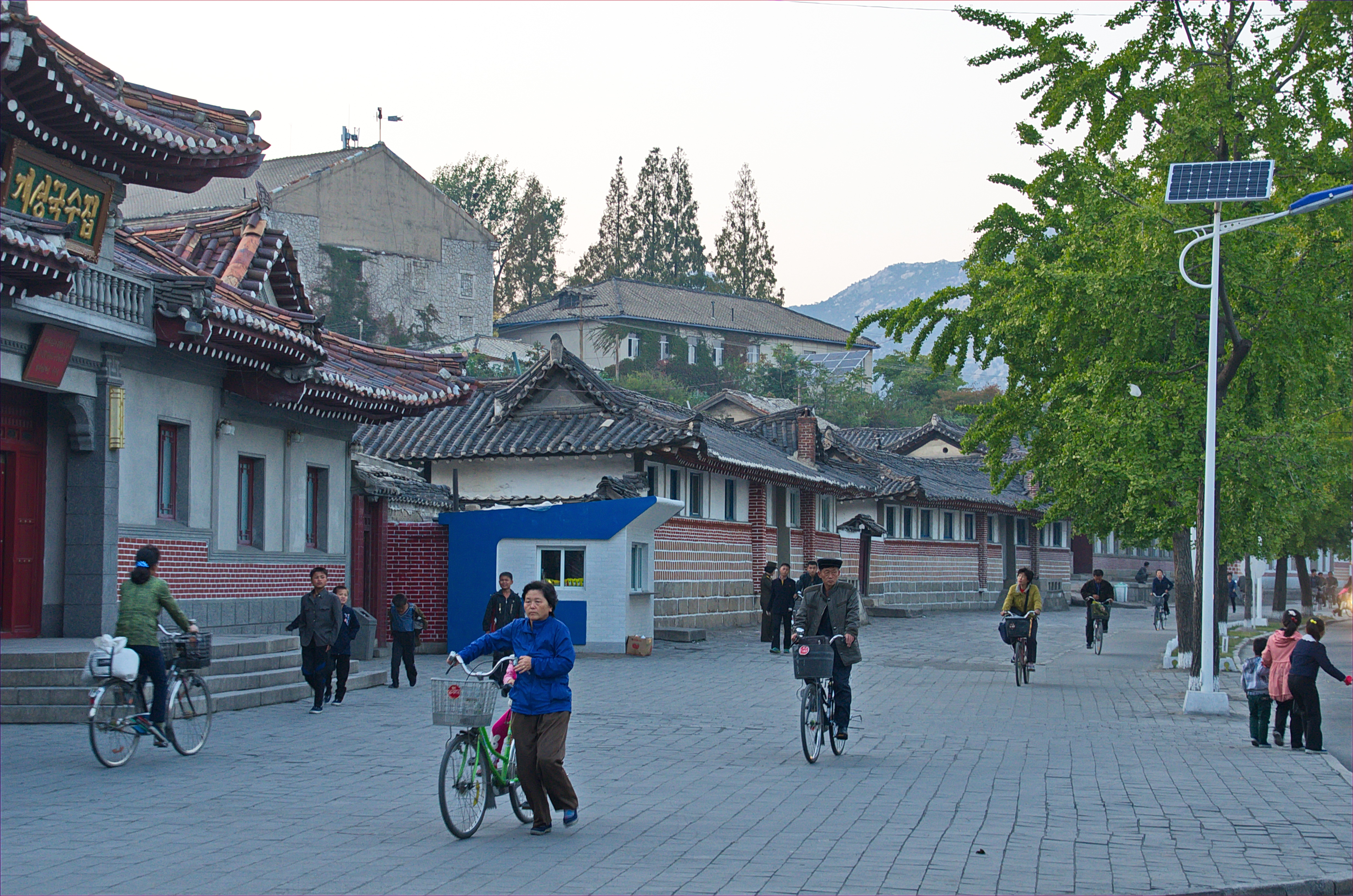
Bicycles with visible North Korean registration plates in Kaesong, 2015

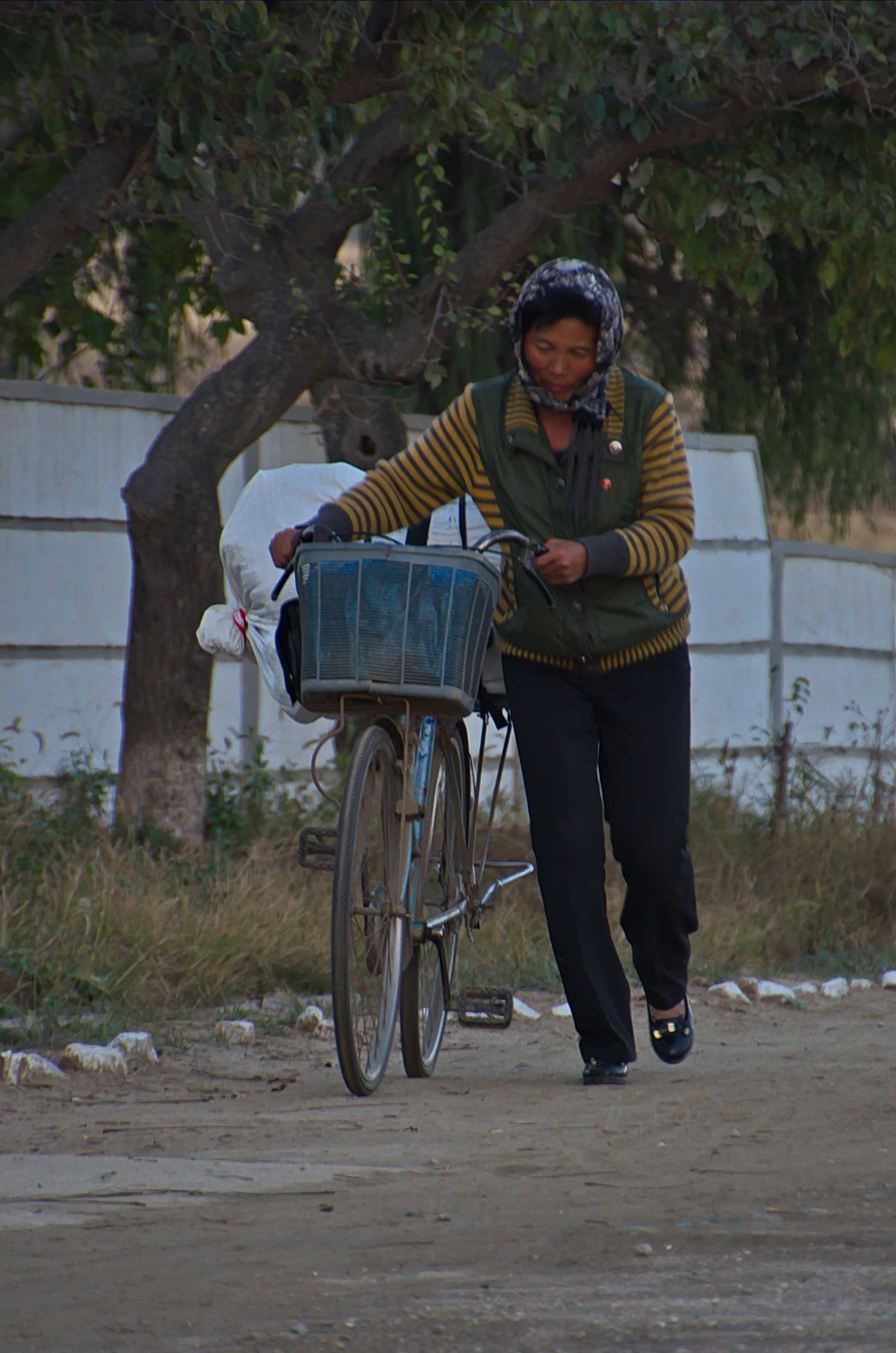
A woman pushing a bicycle near Kangso, 2015

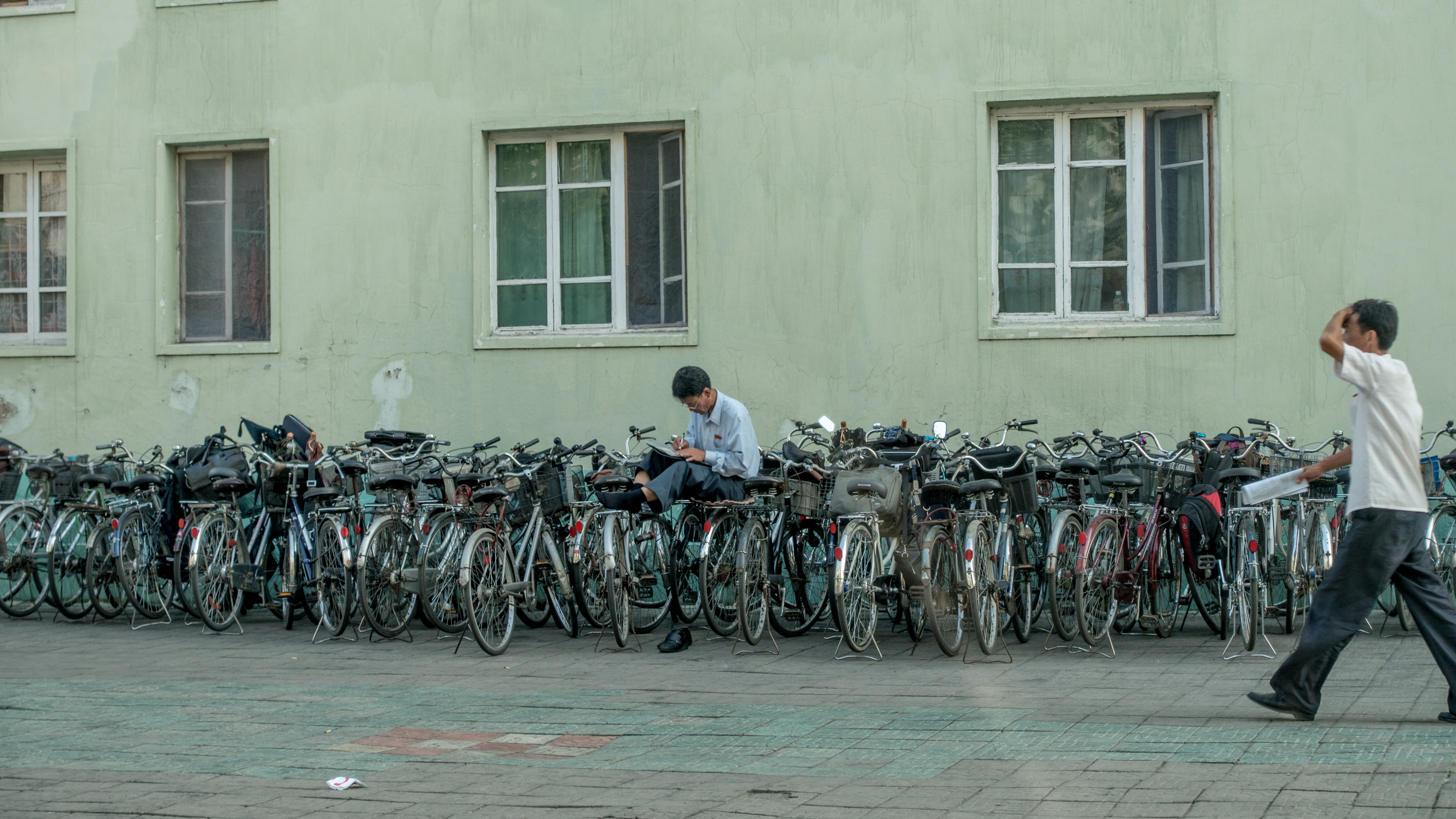
Bicycle parking in Kangwon, 2015

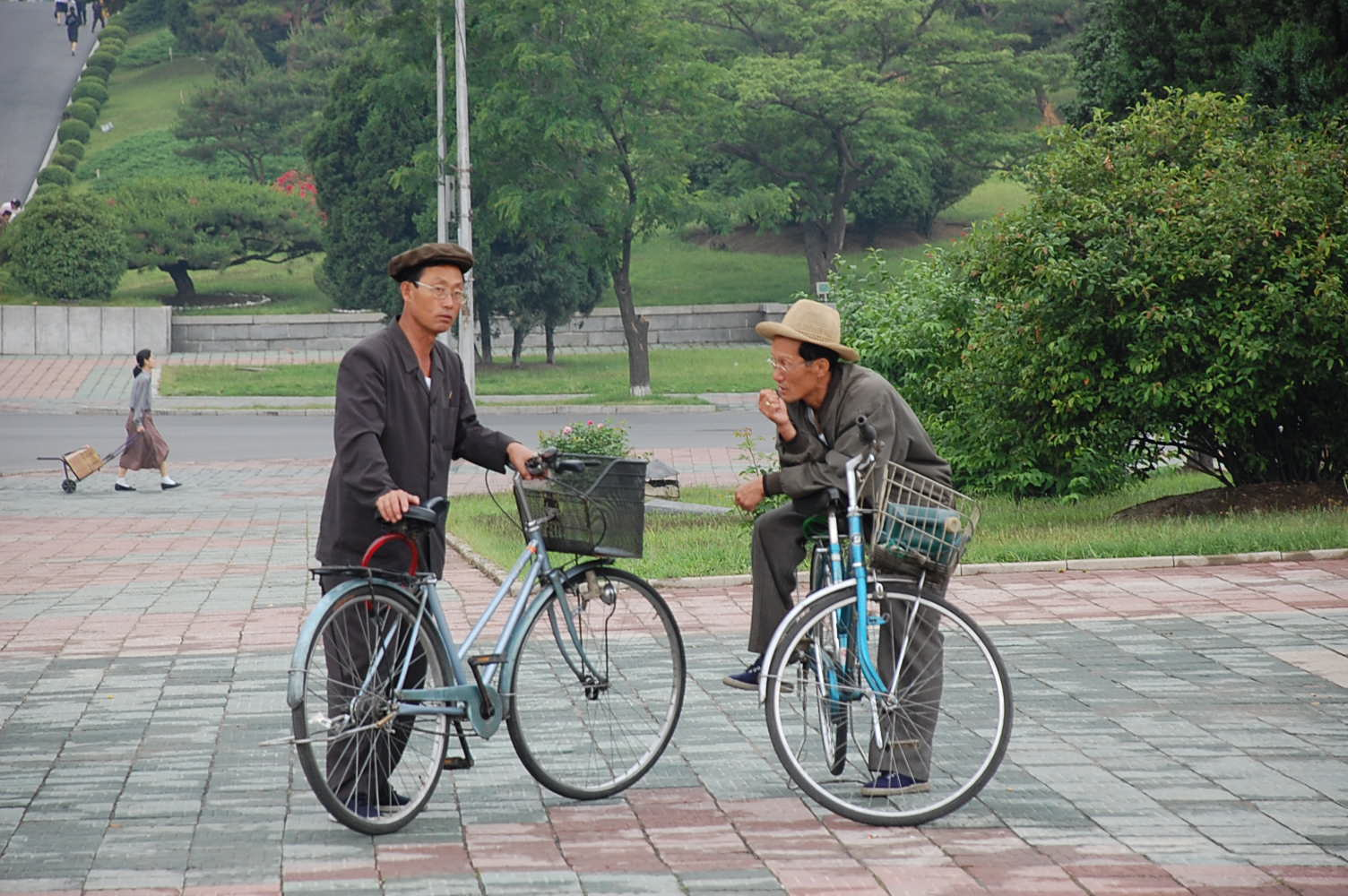
Two men with bicycles, Pyongyang, 2016

== See also ==
- Transport in North Korea
