= Cycling at the 2011 Pan American Games – Qualification =

- There is maximum allocation of 220 athletes distributed through qualification events in 2010 and 2011.
- Quota Allocation per gender can vary depending on number of entries.

Event	Men	Women	Total
Track	49	34	83
Road	20	15	35
Mountain Biking	~~24~~ 26	~~14~~ 11	~~38~~ 37
BMX	~~22~~ 20	~~14~~ 16	36
Host Country	14	10	24
Caribbean Championships	4	0	4
Total athletes	133	87	220

== Qualification timeline ==
Event	Date	Location
2010 Caribbean Cycling Championships	October 24–26, 2010	(Guadeloupe) Basse-Terre
2011 Pan American Mountain Biking Championships	April 1–3, 2011	(Colombia) Chía
2011 Elite Pan American Track Cycling Championships	May 1–8, 2011	(Colombia) Medellín
2011 Elite Pan American Road Cycling Championships	May 1–8, 2011	(Colombia) Medellín

- BMX qualification was with the end of the 2010 BMX rankings, with the athletes unknown as of January 2011.

== Track cycling ==
=== Men ===
==== Team Sprint ====
Event	Vacancies	Qualified
Host	1	Mexico
Pan American Championship	5	Argentina; Brazil; Chile; Canada; Venezuela
TOTAL	6	

==== Individual Sprint ====
Event	Vacancies	Qualified
Pan American Championship	6	El Salvador; Brazil; Chile; Costa Rica; Trinidad and Tobago; Ecuador
TOTAL	6	

== Road cycling ==
Each NOC can enter a maximum of 4 male and 3 female.

=== Men ===
Event	Vacancies	Qualified
Pan American Championship	15	Brazil; Chile; Colombia; Colombia; Mexico; Brazil; Colombia; Cuba; Ecuador; Mexico; Guatemala; Brazil; Dominican Republic; Guatemala; Costa Rica
Pan American Championship Individual time trial	5	Argentina; Colombia; Venezuela; Panama; Canada
Caribbean Cycling championship	3	Trinidad and Tobago; Dominican Republic; Antigua and Barbuda; Netherlands Antilles
TOTAL	24	

- The Caribbean championship was to qualify 4 male athletes in any discipline, but all four were qualified in the road competition. This however does not take away from the quota for the road discipline for males.

=== Women ===
Event	Vacancies	Qualified
Pan American Championship	10	Canada; El Salvador; United States; Venezuela; Brazil; Venezuela; Cuba; Chile; Mexico; Chile
Pan American Championship Individual time trial	5	Canada; United States; United States; Argentina; Canada
TOTAL	15	

== Mountain biking ==
Each NOC may enter up to 2 athletes each.

=== Men ===
Event	Athletes per NOC	Qualified
Pan American Championship	2	Argentina; Brazil; Canada; Chile; Colombia; Costa Rica; Cuba; Ecuador; Mexico; Puerto Rico; United States; Venezuela
Pan American Championship	1	El Salvador; Aruba
TOTAL	26	

=== Women ===
Event	Athletes per NOC	Qualified
Pan American Championship	1	Argentina; Brazil; Canada; Chile; Colombia; Costa Rica; Ecuador; Mexico; Puerto Rico; United States; Venezuela
TOTAL	11	

== BMX ==
=== Men ===
Event	Athletes per NOC	Qualified
BMX Ranking	2	Argentina; Brazil; Bolivia; Canada; Chile; Colombia; Ecuador; Mexico; United States; Venezuela
TOTAL	20	

=== Women ===
Event	Athletes per NOC	Qualified
BMX Ranking	2	Argentina; Brazil; Canada; Colombia; Mexico; United States; Venezuela
BMX Ranking	1	Chile; Ecuador
TOTAL	16	
