= Cycling in Los Angeles =

Bike usage in California's most populous city and county

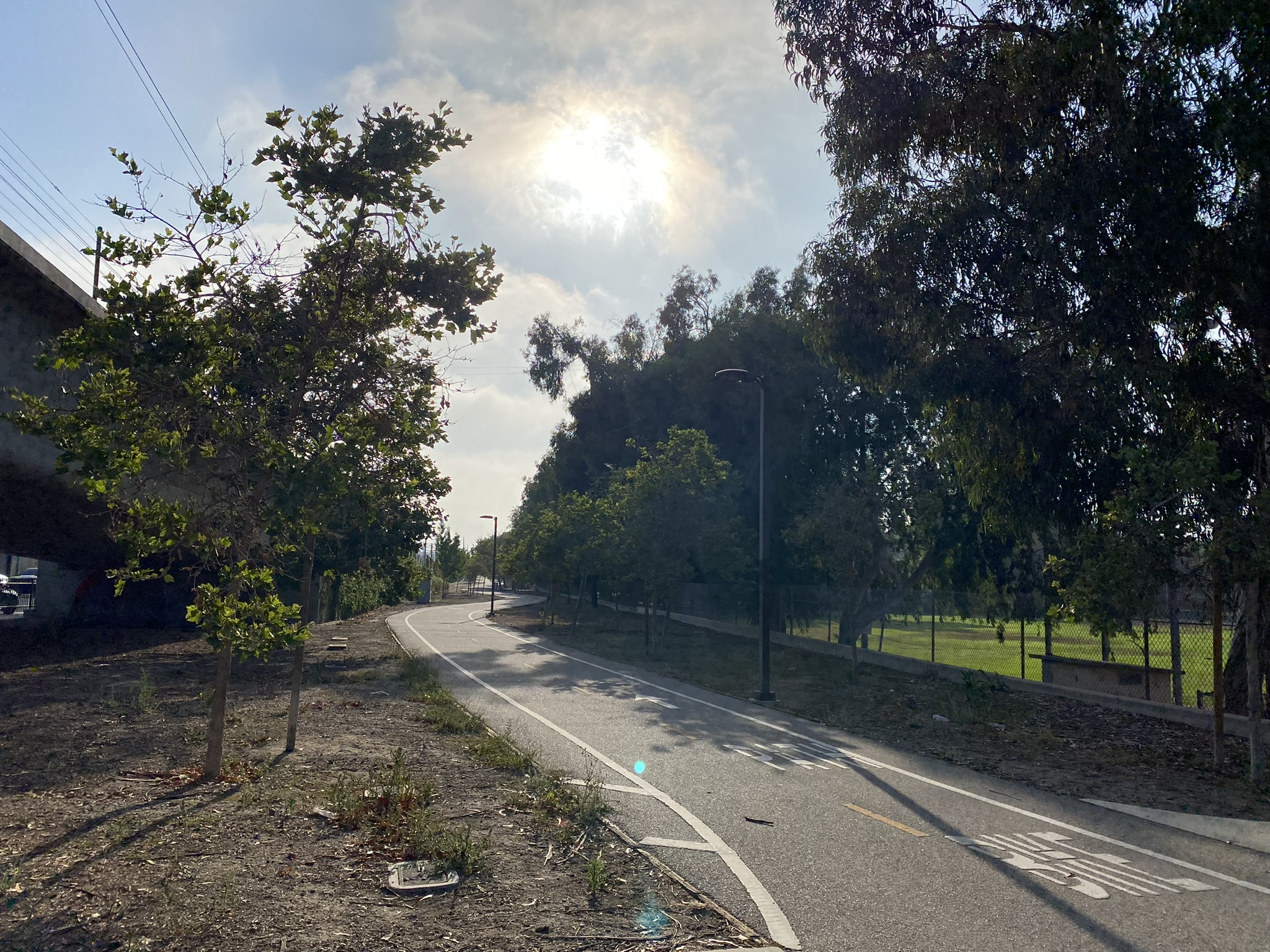
Expo Line Bikeway

Cycling in Los Angeles accounts for about one percent (1.0%) of all work commutes. Because of the mild climate, there is little need to carry the variety of clothing that cyclists require in other less temperate climates.

== History ==
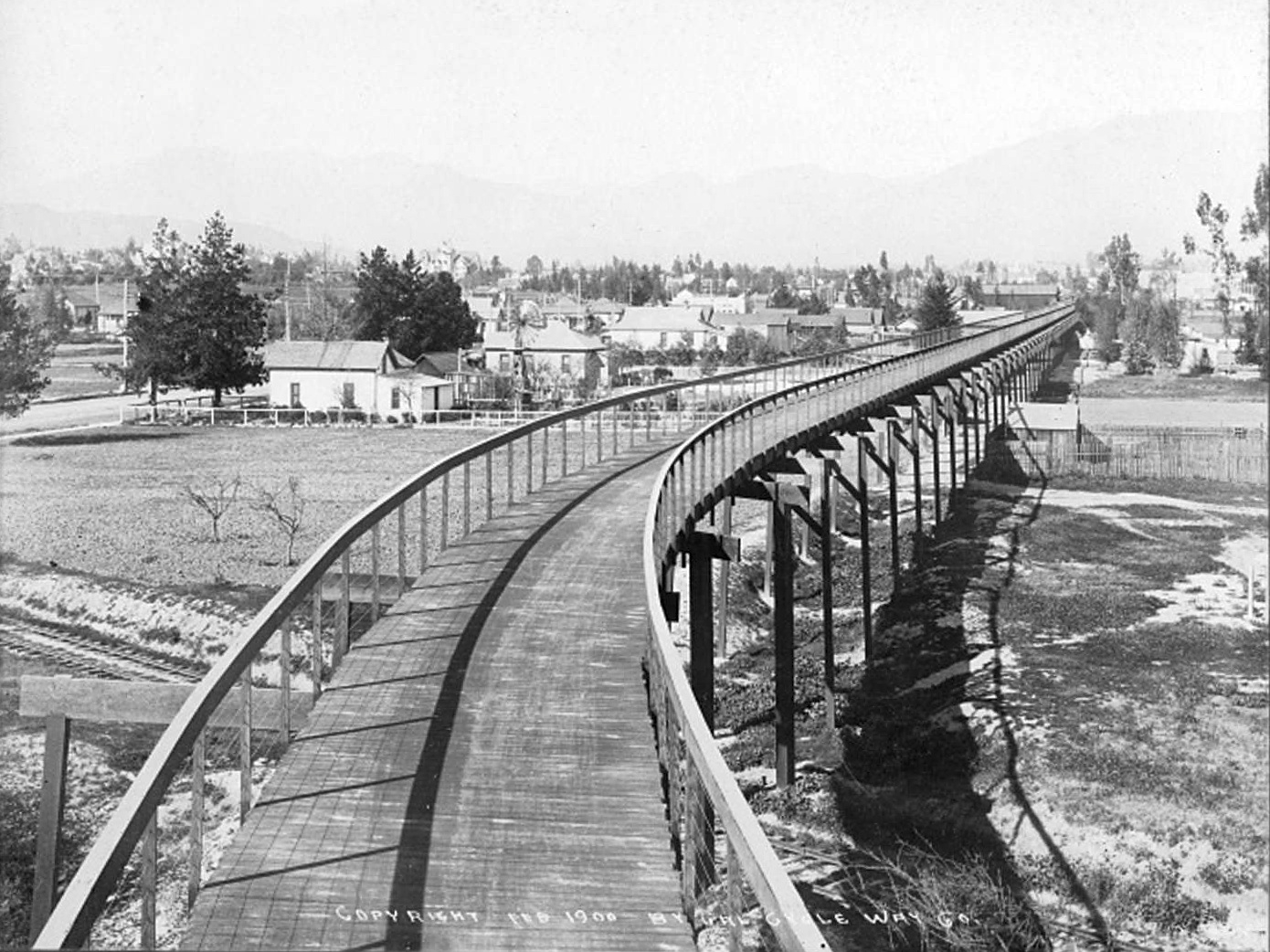
The California Cycleway, 1900

One of the world's earliest examples of a segregated cycle facility was the nine-mile dedicated Cycle-Way built in 1897 to connect Pasadena to Los Angeles. Its right-of-way followed the stream bed of the Arroyo Seco and required 1,250,000 board feet (2,900 m^{3}) of pine to construct. The roundtrip toll was 15¢ and it was lit with electric lights along its entire length. The route did not succeed, and the right-of-way later became the route for the Arroyo Seco Parkway, an automobile freeway opened in 1940.

== Los Angeles' cycling network ==
As of April 29, 2008, there were more than 350 miles (560 km) of bike lanes and paths in the Los Angeles bike path network, such as the Los Angeles River bicycle path, which runs from Burbank to Cypress Park and from Maywood to Long Beach, with a gap of approximately 8 miles through Downtown Los Angeles and adjacent industrial zones separating the two sections. Metro aims to join the two sections by the year 2027 via the LA River Path Project

On September 9, 2011, city councilman Ed Reyes unveiled a new 2.2-mile bike lane stretching along 7th Street from Catalina Avenue in Koreatown to Figueroa Street downtown.

== Cycling rules and regulations ==
=== Road rules ===
Cyclists may travel either in the street or on the sidewalk. On the sidewalk they must behave so as not to cause danger to pedestrians (which is an arbitrary judgment that seems to translate into traveling at walking pace). Moreover, in some of the cities within the greater Los Angeles region, it is illegal to cycle on the sidewalk. Cyclists in general should follow the same traffic rules and behavior as motorized vehicles. It is legal for a cyclist to "take a lane" within the State of California, and in the case of narrow-width lanes it is advisable to do so.

It is not required to wear a helmet unless the rider is under the age of 18 years. A driver's license is also not required for a cyclist. The bicycle relevant sections of the California Vehicle Code indicate that a cyclist may ride out from the right-hand curb in order to avoid obstacles. This explicit provision, combined with the California Driver's Handbook (which indicates that passing vehicles must ensure 3 feet (0.91 m) minimum safe passing distance), means that certain lanes which are not wide enough for a bicycle and a passing automobile should be occupied by the bicycle until it is safe for the cyclist to pull in to the right and signal the automobile to overtake if there is no other safe-passing lane available for the automobile.

=== On public transport ===
Both Metro Bus and Metro Rail services are bicycle accessible. All Metro buses have two bicycle racks at the front of the bus, except for the G Line, which has three bicycle racks. Metro Rail allows bicycles on trains at all times.

Bicycles are allowed on the Metrolink commuter rail system, which connects the core of the city to the suburbs. There is storage for two bicycles at the rear of each carriage. The mechanism consists of two pairs of velcro straps per bicycle, which fasten the front and rear wheels to supports. A Metrolink ticket is also valid for any Metro bus, subway, or light rail train in Los Angeles County, and most of the buses in the surrounding communities.

== Annual bicycle events ==
- Los Angeles River Ride
- CicLAvia

== See also ==
- Bicycle transportation planning in Los Angeles
- List of Los Angeles bike paths
- Bicycle Kitchen
- Midnight Ridazz
