= Cycling at the 2010 South American Games – Women's 500 metres time trial =

Women's cycling event in 2010

The Women's 500m time trial event at the 2010 South American Games was held on March 21.

== Medalists ==
Gold	Silver	Bronze
Diana García; Colombia	Milena Salcedo; Colombia	Sumaia Ribeiro; Brazil

== Results ==
Rank	Rider	250m	Time
1st place, gold medalist(s)	Diana García (COL)	20.092 (1)	35.441
2nd place, silver medalist(s)	Milena Salcedo (COL)	20.799 (2)	36.831
3rd place, bronze medalist(s)	Sumaia Ribeiro (BRA)	21.170 (4)	37.416
4	Marines Prada (VEN)	21.059 (3)	37.825
5	Irene Aravena Cortes (CHI)	21.334 (5)	37.852
6	Maira Barbosa (BRA)	21.628 (6)	38.852
7	Daiana Almada (ARG)	22.104 (9)	39.427
8	Caterine Priviley (ARG)	22.057 (8)	39.708
9	Maria Paz Bravo (CHI)	21.858 (7)	39.718
10	Valeria Bacilia Ruiloba (BOL)	24.055 (10)	42.242
