= Cycling at the 2010 South American Games – Men's scratch race =

The Men's Scratch Race event at the 2010 South American Games was held on March 20.

== Medalists ==
Gold	Silver	Bronze
Carlos Alzate; Colombia	Dario Colla; Argentina	Sebastian Cancio; Argentina

== Results ==
Distance: 60 laps (15 km)
Elapsed time: 19:28.109
Average Speed: 46.228 km/h

Rank	Rider	Laps Down
1st place, gold medalist(s)	Carlos Alzate (COL)	
2nd place, silver medalist(s)	Dario Colla (ARG)	–1
3rd place, bronze medalist(s)	Sebastian Cancio (ARG)	–1
4	Luis Miguel Almonacid (CHI)	–1
5	Jose Carlos Guzman (ECU)	–1
6	Thiago Nardin (BRA)	–1
7	Pablo Jacobo Duque (CHI)	–1
8	Carlos Urán (COL)	–2
9	Maximo Rojas (VEN)	–2
10	Victor Hugo Mercado (BOL)	–3
11	Edgard Nicolas Palma (URU)	–3
12	Luciano Pagliarini (BRA)	–3
13	Carlos Eduardo Quishpe (ECU)	–3
	Gil Cordoves (VEN)	DNF
	Gabriel Aguiar (URU)	DNF
	Jair Tjon En Fa (SUN)	DNF
