= Cycling at the 2010 South American Games – Men's cross-country =

The Men's Cross-Country event at the 2010 South American Games was held at 11:30 on March 23.

== Medalists ==
Gold	Silver	Bronze
Héctor Leonardo Páez; Colombia	Rubens Valeriano; Brazil	Fabio Castañeda; Colombia

== Results ==
Race distance: 43 km (10 laps)

Rank	Rider	Time	Time Behind	Speed
1st place, gold medalist(s)	Héctor Leonardo Páez (COL)	1:55:11		22.399
2nd place, silver medalist(s)	Rubens Valeriano (BRA)	1:57:04	+1:53	22.038
3rd place, bronze medalist(s)	Fabio Castañeda (COL)	2:02:57	+7:46	20.984
4	Catriel Soto (ARG)	2:03:50	+8:39	20.834
5	Edivando Cruz (BRA)	2:03:58	+8:47	20.812
6	Gonzalo Eduardo Garcia (CHI)	2:04:20	+9:09	20.750
7	Jose Eduardo Catalan (CHI)	–4 LAP		
8	Jesus Gregorio Rojas (VEN)	–5 LAP		
9	Javier Guzman (VEN)	–8 LAP		
	Dario Gasco (ARG)	DNF7		
