= Cycling at the 2010 South American Games – Women's Keirin =

The Women's Keirin event at the 2010 South American Games was held on March 20. The qualifications and repechage were held on the morning and the semifinals and finals on the evening.

== Medalists ==
Gold	Silver	Bronze
Diana García; Colombia	Milena Salcedo; Colombia	Daiana Almada; Argentina

== Results ==
=== First round ===
==== Heat 1 ====
Rank	Rider	Q
1	Diana García (COL)	Q
2	Marines Prada (VEN)	Q
3	Daiana Almada (ARG)	
4	Maria Paz Bravo (CHI)	
5	Maira Barbosa (BRA)	

==== Heat 2 ====
Rank	Rider	Q
1	Milena Salcedo (COL)	Q
2	Sumaia Ribeiro (BRA)	Q
3	Irene Aravena Cortes (CHI)	
4	Caterine Priviley (ARG)	

=== Repechage ===
Rank	Rider	Q
1	Maira Barbosa (BRA)	Q
2	Daiana Almada (ARG)	Q
3	Irene Aravena Cortes (CHI)	
4	Caterine Priviley (ARG)	
5	Maria Paz Bravo (CHI)	

=== Final ===
Rank	Rider
1st place, gold medalist(s)	Diana García (COL)
2nd place, silver medalist(s)	Milena Salcedo (COL)
3rd place, bronze medalist(s)	Daiana Almada (ARG)
4	Sumaia Ribeiro (BRA)
5	Marines Prada (VEN)
6	Maira Barbosa (BRA)
