= Cycling at the 2010 South American Games – Women's sprint =

The Women's Individual Sprint event at the 2010 South American Games was held on 18 March. The qualifications and quarterfinals were held on the morning and the semifinals and finals on the evening.

== Medalists ==
Gold	Silver	Bronze
Diana García; Colombia	Milena Salcedo; Colombia	Sumaia Ribeiro; Brazil

== Results ==
=== Qualification ===
Rank	Rider	Time	Speed	Q
1	Diana García (COL)	11.570	62.229	Q
2	Milena Salcedo (COL)	12.143	59.293	Q
3	Sumaia Ribeiro (BRA)	12.578	57.242	Q
4	Marines Prada (VEN)	12.797	56.263	Q
5	Irene Aravena Cortes (CHI)	12.817	56.175	Q
6	Maira Barbosa (BRA)	12.873	55.931	Q
7	Daiana Almada (ARG)	13.004	55.367	Q
8	Maria Paz Bravo (CHI)	13.416	53.667	Q
9	Caterine Priviley (ARG)	13.528	53.222	

=== Quarterfinals ===
Heat	Rank	Rider	Race 1	Race 2	Decider	Q
1	1	Diana García (COL)	13.273	13.001		Q
1	2	Maria Paz Bravo (CHI)				
2	1	Milena Salcedo (COL)	12.755	13.363		Q
2	2	Daiana Almada (ARG)				
3	1	Sumaia Ribeiro (BRA)	13.840	12.551		Q
3	2	Maira Barbosa (BRA)				
4	1	Marines Prada (VEN)	12.801	12.986		Q
4	2	Irene Aravena Cortes (CHI)				

=== Semifinals ===
Heat	Rank	Rider	Race 1	Race 2	Decider	Q
1	1	Diana García (COL)	12.513	12.536		QF
1	2	Marines Prada (VEN)				QB
2	1	Milena Salcedo (COL)	12.446	12.465		QF
2	2	Sumaia Ribeiro (BRA)				QB

=== Finals ===
Heat	Rank	Rider	Race 1	Race 2	Decider
1	1st place, gold medalist(s)	Diana García (COL)	12.359	12.190	
1	2nd place, silver medalist(s)	Milena Salcedo (COL)			
2	3rd place, bronze medalist(s)	Sumaia Ribeiro (BRA)	13.040	12.823	
2	4	Marines Prada (VEN)			
