= List of World University Games records in track cycling =

World University Games records in the sport of track cycling are ratified by the International University Sports Federation (FISU).

== Men ==
Event	Record	Athlete	Nationality	Date	Meet	Place	Ref
Flying 200 m time trial	10.148	Denis Dmitriev	Russia	16 August 2011	2011 Universiade	Shenzhen, China	
1 km time trial	1:06.874	Aleksandr Panfilov	Soviet Union	4 July 1983	1983 Universiade	Edmonton, Canada	
4000m individual pursuit	4:25.122	Sergei Shilov	Russia	16 August 2011	2011 Universiade	Shenzhen, China	

== Women ==
Event	Record	Athlete	Nationality	Date	Meet	Place	Ref
Flying 200 m time trial	11.215	Guo Shuang	China	16 August 2011	2011 Universiade	Shenzhen, China	
500 m time trial	34.910	Gong Jinjie	China	16 August 2011	2011 Universiade	Shenzhen, China	
1 km time trial	1:14.554	Erika Salumäe	Soviet Union	4 July 1983	1983 Universiade	Edmonton, Canada	
3000m individual pursuit	3:36.944	Vilija Sereikaitė	Lithuania	17 August 2011	2011 Universiade	Shenzhen, China	
