= Cycling in Illinois =

Cycling in Illinois encompasses recreation, bikeways, laws and rules, and advocacy. The director of the Illinois Department of Natural Resources, Joel Brunsvold, explained Illinois cycling opportunities: “Bicycle riding is one of the most popular outdoor recreational activities in Illinois, enjoyed by young and old alike...Illinois has a variety of trails for the public to enjoy. The terrain includes flat prairie land to rolling hills, towering bluffs to the breathtaking river and lakefront views.” Many communities across the state are updating bicycle infrastructure in order to accommodate the increased number of cyclists on the roads.

== Recreation ==
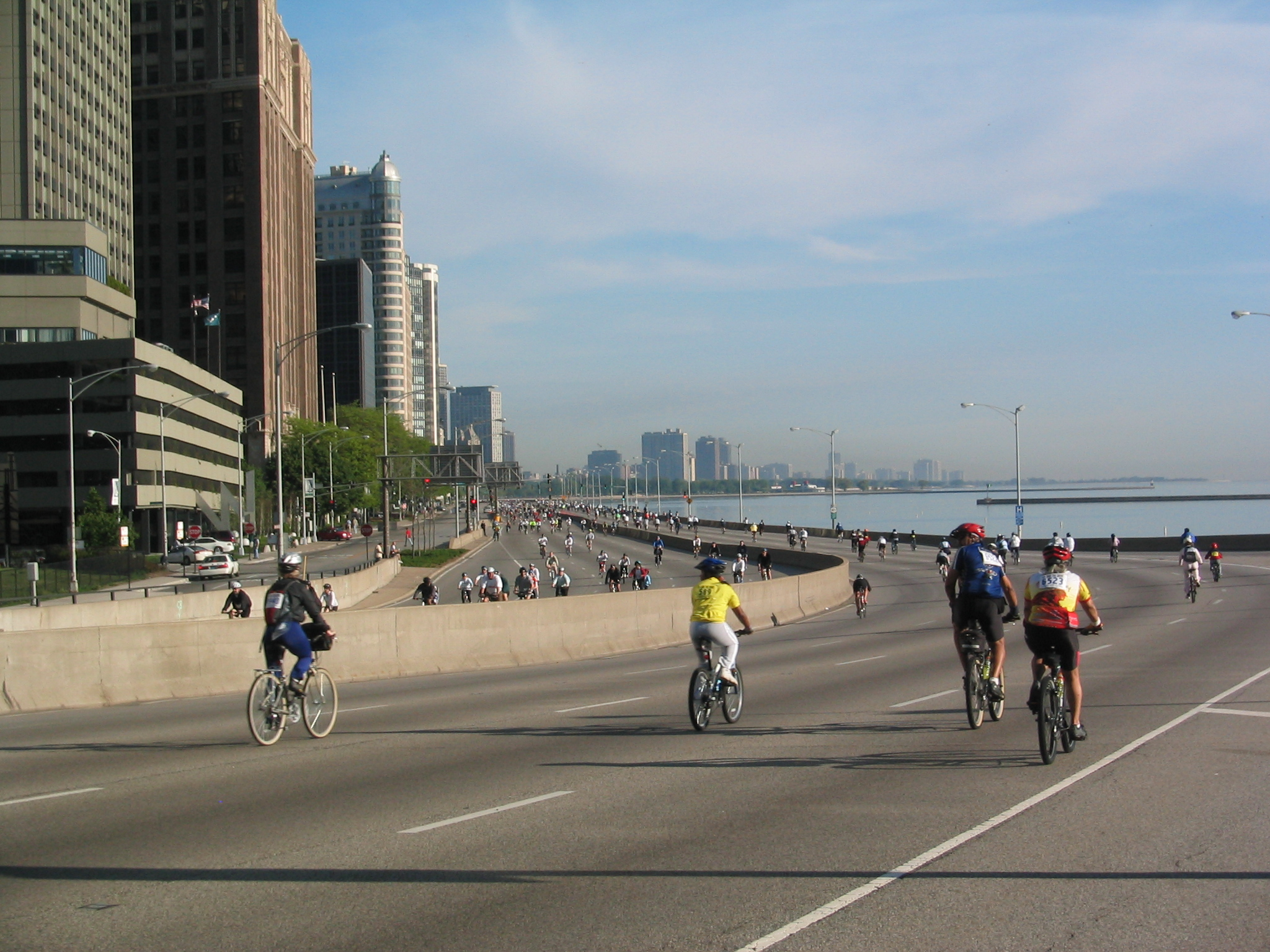
Lake Shore Drive during Bike the Drive

Illinois has an active bike culture with many clubs, groups, and places to ride. One can find a road, cyclocross, and mountain bike racing as well as non-competitive and charity rides across the state.

The Illinois Cycling Association promotes amateur bicycle racing by hosting a race calendar and database of racing clubs/team. The types of races listed on the calendar consist of road, criterium, track, and cyclocross.

One of the notable non-competitive bicycle events in Illinois is Bike the Drive. It is an opportunity for cyclists to ride a 15 mile stretch of Lake Shore Drive (Chicago) without any automobile traffic. During the 2009 Bike the Drive, the drive was closed to automobile traffic from 5:30 am to 10:30 am. Each cyclist chooses their own route from the 30 mile (round trip) course and rides at their own pace. Riders may ride the course as many times as possible during the specified event time.

== Laws and rules ==
While there are some Illinois laws specific to bicycles, generally, bicyclists have the same rights and responsibilities as roadway users. Since bicyclists have the same rights, motorists must be aware of and interact with bicyclists appropriately and lawfully. Bicyclists are responsible for obeying all of the applicable rules for motorists as well as obeying all bicycle specific laws when traveling on public roadways.

=== Motorists interacting with bicyclists ===
Motorists are legally obligated to:

- yield to bicyclists' right of way
- pass bicyclists slowly and allow at least 3 feet
- not park or drive in designated bike lanes
- allow incoming bicyclist on the right to pass before proceeding with a right turn
- stay behind bicyclists until a left turn is completed (when sharing a left turn lane)
- check for passing bicyclists before opening a vehicle door
- not follow bicyclists too closely, and be prepared to stop.

=== Bicyclists interacting with motorists ===
Bicyclists are required to adhere to Illinois traffic laws unless otherwise specified. In addition, there are rules governing bicyclists' behavior in certain situations.

==== Lane position ====
When traveling at a slower speed than vehicular traffic, bicyclists must ride as close to the right-hand edge as is safe and practical. Exceptions include: when passing another bicycle or vehicle traveling in the same direction, when preparing for a left turn, when necessary to avoid objects or road hazards, when traveling on a road of width too narrow for bicycles and motorized vehicles to safely travel side by side, when preparing for an authorized right hand turn, when traveling on a one lane road with two or more lanes (bicyclist can ride on left-hand side).

==== Left turns ====
When preparing for a left turn, a bicyclist may choose from two styles of turns: vehicular and pedestrian. A vehicular-style turn, as the name implies, mimics the procedure of the motor vehicle. The bicyclist moves (after signaling) to the left turn lane or left side of the lane (in the absence of a left turn lane). Proceed with the turn according to traffic signals. When executing a pedestrian-style turn, the bicyclist remains on the right-hand side of the roadway and proceeds through the cross street, stopping at the corner. From this point, the bicyclist may proceed in the new direction, yielding to traffic and obeying traffic signals.

==== Hand signals ====
Bicyclists must use hand signals when preparing to turn or stop.

Signal a left turn by extending the left arm horizontally.

Signal a right turn by:

1. extending the left arm, bending at the elbow, and extending the forearm upward.
2. extending the arm horizontally (only legal for bicyclists, not motorists).

Signal slowing/stopping by extending the left arm horizontally, bending at the elbow, and pointing down with a flat/open hand.

==== Riding at night ====
Riding a bicycle at night requires special attention. When operating a bicycle at nighttime, a bicycle must be equipped with (and be operating) a functional, white lamp that is visible from at least 500 ft. In addition, the bicycle must be mounted with an Illinois Department of Transportation approved, red reflector visible from 100 – 600 ft.

== Advocacy ==
Advocacy groups exist to promote the needs and interests of bicyclists. The needs of bicyclists include improving riding conditions/access, educating cyclists about laws and safety, educating motorists about laws and safety, and sharing the benefits of riding a bike with the general public.

== Bikeways ==
Illinois has both multi-use and dedicated bike paths throughout the state. IDOT (Illinois Department of Transportation) provides nine regional interactive maps. The maps include information on the location of dedicated bike infrastructure. Also, included is an assessment of the bike friendliness of public roadways. According to the League of Illinois Bicyclists, these IDOT maps are the best place for information about rural roadways.
