= Cycling at the 2010 South American Games – Men's Omnium =

The Men's Omnium event at the 2010 South American Games was held on March 21. The five events of the competition (200m sprint, scratch race, 3,000m pursuit, points race and kilometer time trial) were held on the same day.

== Medalists ==
Gold	Silver	Bronze
Carlos Urán; Colombia	Sebastian Cancio; Argentina	Pablo Seisdedos; Chile

== Results ==
=== Sprint 200m ===
Rank	Rider	Time	Speed
1	Carlos Urán (COL)	10.976	65.597
2	Pablo Seisdedos (CHI)	11.245	64.028
3	Randal Figueroa (VEN)	11.260	63.943
4	Sebastian Cancio (ARG)	11.466	62.904
5	Jair Tjon En Fa (SUR)	11.504	62.904
6	Luciano Pagliarini (BRA)	11.712	62.586
7	Jose Carlos Guzman (ECU)	11.787	61.084

=== Scratch Race ===
Distance: 20 laps (5 km)

Rank	Rider	Laps Down
1	Jose Carlos Guzman (ECU)	
2	Carlos Urán (COL)	
3	Sebastian Cancio (ARG)	
4	Pablo Seisdedos (CHI)	–1
5	Luciano Pagliarini (BRA)	–1
6	Randal Figueroa (VEN)	–3
	Jair Tjon En Fa (SUR)	DNS

=== Individual Pursuit ===
Rank	Rider	1000m	2000m	Final	Speed
1	Carlos Urán (COL)	1:11.592 (1)	2:18.694 (1)	3:25.750	52.490
2	Sebastian Cancio (ARG)	1:12.634 (3)	2:20.302 (2)	3:29.688	51.505
3	Pablo Seisdedos (CHI)	1:12.149 (2)	2:21.125 (3)	3:30.851	51.221
4	Jose Carlos Guzman (ECU)	1:14.824 (4)	2:25.586 (4)	3:37.822	49.581
5	Luciano Pagliarini (BRA)	1:15.117 (5)	2:27.869 (5)	3:40.061	49.077
6	Randal Figueroa (VEN)	1:17.190 (6)	2:35.119 (6)	3:57.273	45.517

=== Points Race ===
Distance: 60 laps (15 km) with 6 sprint
Elapsed time: 19:56.090
Average Speed: 45.147 km/h

Rank	Rider	Sprint						Finish	Lap Points			Total
Rank	Rider	1	2	3	4	5	6	Finish	+	–	Balance	Total
1	Jose Carlos Guzman (ECU)	2		5		2	1	6	20		20	30
2	Sebastian Cancio (ARG)	5	5	3	1	5	3	2				22
3	Carlos Urán (COL)	1	2	2	5	3	5	1				18
4	Pablo Seisdedos (CHI)		1	1	3	1	2	3				8
5	Luciano Pagliarini (BRA)	3	3		2			5		20	–20	–12
6	Randal Figueroa (VEN)							4		60	–60	–60

=== Kilometer Time Trial ===
Rank	Rider	250m	500m	750m	Time
1	Carlos Urán (COL)	20.087 (1)	34.983 (1)	50.226 (1)	1:06.270
2	Pablo Seisdedos (CHI)	20.469 (2)	35.683 (2)	51.323 (2)	1:07.110
3	Sebastian Cancio (ARG)	21.672 (6)	36.734 (4)	52.082(3)	1:08.032
4	Jose Carlos Guzman (ECU)	20.932 (3)	36.449 (3)	52.531 (4)	1:09.459
5	Luciano Pagliarini (BRA)	20.990 (4)	36.973 (5)	53.525 (5)	1:10.899
6	Randal Figueroa (VEN)	21.385 (5)	37.498 (6)	53.900 (6)	1:11.194

=== Final standings ===
Rank	Rider	Sprint	Scratch	Pursuit	Points Race	Kilometer	Total
1st place, gold medalist(s)	Carlos Urán (COL)	1	2	1	3	1	8
2nd place, silver medalist(s)	Sebastian Cancio (ARG)	4	3	2	2	3	14
3rd place, bronze medalist(s)	Pablo Seisdedos (CHI)	2	4	3	4	2	15
4	Jose Carlos Guzman (ECU)	7	1	4	1	4	17
5	Luciano Pagliarini (BRA)	6	5	5	5	5	26
6	Randal Figueroa (VEN)	3	6	6	6	6	27
