= Cycling at the 2010 South American Games – Men's Madison =

The Men's Madison event at the 2010 South American Games was held on March 21.

== Medalists ==
Gold	Silver	Bronze
Carlos Quishpe; Bayron de la Cruz; Ecuador	Sebastian Donadio; Walter Pérez; Argentina	Carlos Ospina; Weimar Roldán; Colombia

== Results ==
Distance: 140 laps (35 km) with 7 sprint
Elapsed time: 43:20.170
Average Speed: 48.458 km/h

Rank	Rider	Sprint							Finish	Total	Laps Down
Rank	Rider	1	2	3	4	5	6	7	Finish	Total	Laps Down
1st place, gold medalist(s)	Ecuador; Carlos Quishpe; Bayron de la Cruz								5	0	
2nd place, silver medalist(s)	Argentina; Sebastian Donadio; Walter Pérez		5	3	2		5	5	1	20	–1
3rd place, bronze medalist(s)	Colombia; Carlos Ospina; Weimar Roldán	3	3	5	1	2	2	3	2	19	–1
4	Venezuela; Maximo Rojas; Yosvangs Rojas	2	2	1	3	5	3	2	3	18	–1
5	Chile; Luis Sepulveda Villar; Gonzalo Figueroa	5	1	2		3	1	1	4	13	–1
6	Uruguay; Edgard Nicolas Palma; Milton Wynants				5					5	–1
7	Brazil; Thiago Nardin; Marcos Novello	1				1				2	–1
