= Time trial cycling equipment =

Specialized bicycles

Time trials have been part of cycling for more than a hundred years. The first time trial was run in 1895 after a ban on road racing was imposed by the National Cyclists' Union. It wasn't until 1939 that the time trial made its world stage debut as an official stage of the Tour de France. It was originally used as a method of drawing more people to listen to the Grand Tour on the newly available radio broadcast of the 1939 race. The main thing that distinguished the first time-trial from the traditional form of road racing was that the riders started at intervals instead of one large group and they raced against the clock instead of each other. Unlike road racing where a rider can hang in the peloton and draft off of other riders to conserve energy, time trial races put the rider out alone on the course. There are no breaks and no one to draft off, causing a rider to push as hard as they can the entire race. Bicycles have also evolved to accommodate this new form of racing, with most of the breakthroughs occurring in the last 40–50 years with the introduction of triathlons.

== Components of the bike ==
There are several different aspects of a time trial bike that give the bike its wind cheating ability.

- Frame
- Component group
- Cranks
- Wheels
- Aerobars
- Hydration systems
- Helmets
- Time-trial clothing

== Time-trial vs. road bikes ==
While both road bikes and time-trial originate from the old bikes used in the Grand Tours, these two classes of bikes have evolved in such a way as to cheat the wind and the clock and retained very few similarities. When the first time-trials were introduced into the Tour de France, little consideration was given to the type of machine the riders would use. The bikes they used for all of the group stages worked just as well as anything that existed during the time period, so that is what was used. Road bikes have existed as competition racing machines for almost 100 years before the earliest modern time-trial/triathlon bike made its debut in the cycling world. The traditional road frame, or diamond frame, which is still used on bicycles today, appeared barely a hundred years ago. At the time, it was considered one of the most technological advancement. Technology and science together have contributed to the development of today's time-trial machines. The average road bike in the hands of a professional cyclist averages speeds between 20 and 28 miles per hour depending on the terrain.

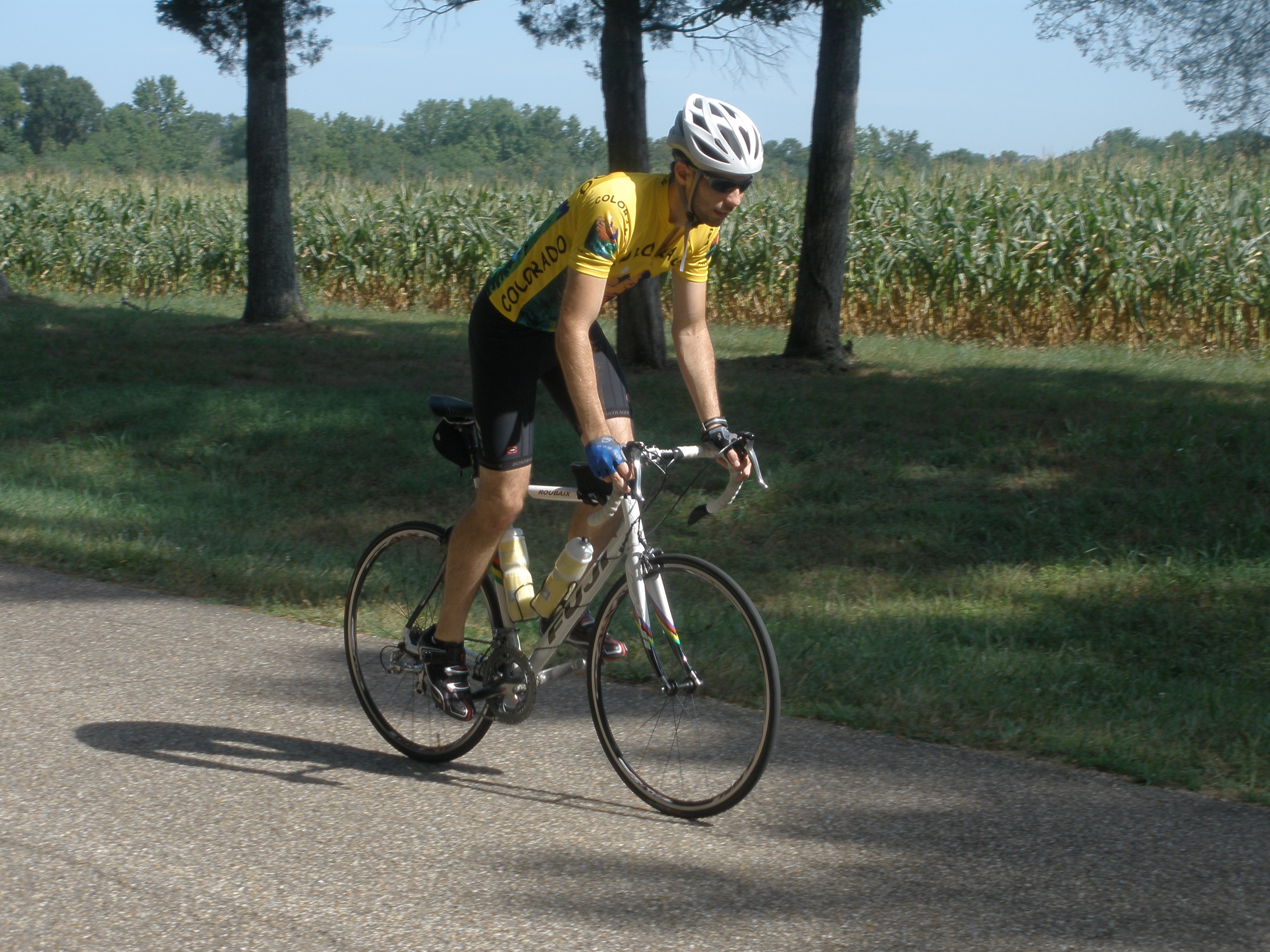
Standard road bike with Shimano 105 group

Time trial bike. Note the smaller frame, and more aggressive riding position

== Component groups ==
Every bike is made up of a series of components. The drive-train components are what make the bike go. These consist of the bike chain, front and rear derailleurs, crankset, and bottom bracket. The drive-train is the one part of the bike that doesn't change significantly between road bikes and time-trial bikes. The three main companies that produce component groups are Campagnolo, Shimano, and SRAM. Campagnolo is the oldest of the three, founded in 1933. Component groups are fairly universal on road bikes and time trial bikes. Both use the same group-sets and depending on the rider and the venue of the practice or race, the same gearing might also be used. The cranks are the main component difference between road and time-trial bikes. A standard crank, which is found on road bike, has two chain-rings and a gearing of 53×39, which means that the large chain-ring has 53 teeth on it and the little ring has 39 teeth. The teeth grab the chain and propel the bike forward. A standard time-trial crank typically has a gearing of 54×42 and has solid chain-rings instead of the hollow metal rings found on road cranks. High end time-trial chain-rings are made from solid carbon fiber with the exception of the teeth.

== Aerobars ==
Traditional road bikes had drop bars that kept the rider in an upright position which created a lot of drag. The new triathlon bikes still had the drop bars, but they incorporated aerobars onto the handlebar. These new bars allowed the riders to get into a wind cheating position. Aerobars come in two different styles: clip-on systems and integrated systems. Clip-on aerobars attach to any handlebars to give the rider the aero advantage on a tri-bike. Integrated systems mean the aerobars and the basebars are all one system and attached to the bike as one whole piece rather than separate components like a clip-on system. There are a few advantages to this; the main one being that an integrated system allows the rider to get into a much lower position and thus be more aerodynamic. On the down side, these types of systems usually only work on tri bikes unless the owner wants to have their road bike completely overhauled into a tri bike. To get the best aero advantage out of the bars, companies spend countless hours in wind tunnels adjusting the aerobars.

== Wheels ==
Beside the frame, the wheels are one of the most vital parts of the bike when it comes to performance. When designing wheels, companies take two major factors into consideration: the weight of the wheel and its shape. The shape of the wheels depends on what its primary use is going to be. Most racing wheels are made with carbon fiber rims and have deeper rims, otherwise known as "deep dishes." While these wheels have been proven to increase a rider's power up to 30%, they can also affect the stability of the bike, especially with crosswinds. They also affect the turning radius of the bike and the rider comfort. These wheels have deeper rims in order to better deflect the air around the wheel. Traditionally wheels come in two sizes, 650c and 700c. The 650c wheels have the advantage of being smaller and lighter which give them a slight advantage on hills but because they do not do as good of a job displacing weight around the bike they are an option for smaller riders. The 700c wheels are the universal size that is used on almost every bike made today. On the rare occasion, a 650c front wheel is paired with a 700c rear wheel to gain better aerodynamics Some of the top racing wheels are built by companies like HED Cycling Products, Zipp, DT Swiss, Shimano, Easton, and Reynolds among others. These carbon fiber specialty wheels are typically only used by individuals who intend to compete, partially because the price tag on a given wheelset can run from $1,300 (Sram S60) up to $6,000 (Reynolds RZR 92.2)

== Specialized hydration systems ==
Hydration is a major part of an athlete's daily life. It is essential for their success both during practice and while competing. As bike technology has evolved, so has the technology for re-fueling the athlete. On a traditional road bike, which has a standard triangular frame, there is more than enough room for two large water-bottles. At most, modern time-trial bikes will hold one water bottle within the frame. High-end time-trial bikes do not have attachments for water bottles within the frame. This lack of water bottle attachments and the need to keep the aero-position throughout a race has not surprisingly led to the development of aero-hydration systems. Due to this lack of water-bottle storage, there are two main types of aero-hydration systems; behind the saddle (seat) and between the aero-bars. Rear-mounted hydration systems attach to the rail on the saddle and are positioned to smooth the air flow over the rider. These types of systems can either consist of a simple seat-mounted water bottle holder that typically holds two water bottles, or a seat-mounted bladder with a drinking tube running along the frame up to the rider. Front-mounted hydration systems have aero properties similar to those of a rear-mounted system, to create as little wind resistance as possible. A front-mounted system is almost always tucked between the aerobars. The most commonly used type of front-mounted hydration system is a water bottle that tucks between the aerobars with a straw that extends up to the rider but can be folded out of the way when not in use.

== Aero savings ==
Time-trial bikes provide a significant aerodynamic advantage over standard road bikes. If a rider averages 75–80 minutes to complete a 40 km course on a road bike, using a traditional metal frame, shallow rimmed wheels, and standard road bike components, including a down-tube mounted water-bottle, then switching these road components to the aerodynamic counterparts could shave the following times off their total ride.
