= Cycling in Bucharest =

Transport by bicycle in Bucharest, Romania

Cycling in Bucharest is less popular than in other European cities, in part due to the lack of cycling infrastructure and because of the low taxes for owning and driving a car. Nevertheless, cycling became increasingly common during the 2010s and thousands of cyclists participate in Critical Mass events, protesting against the Municipality of Bucharest's opposition to building segregated cycle facilities.

The largest biking event is "Prima Evadare" ("The first escape").

== Cycle path ==
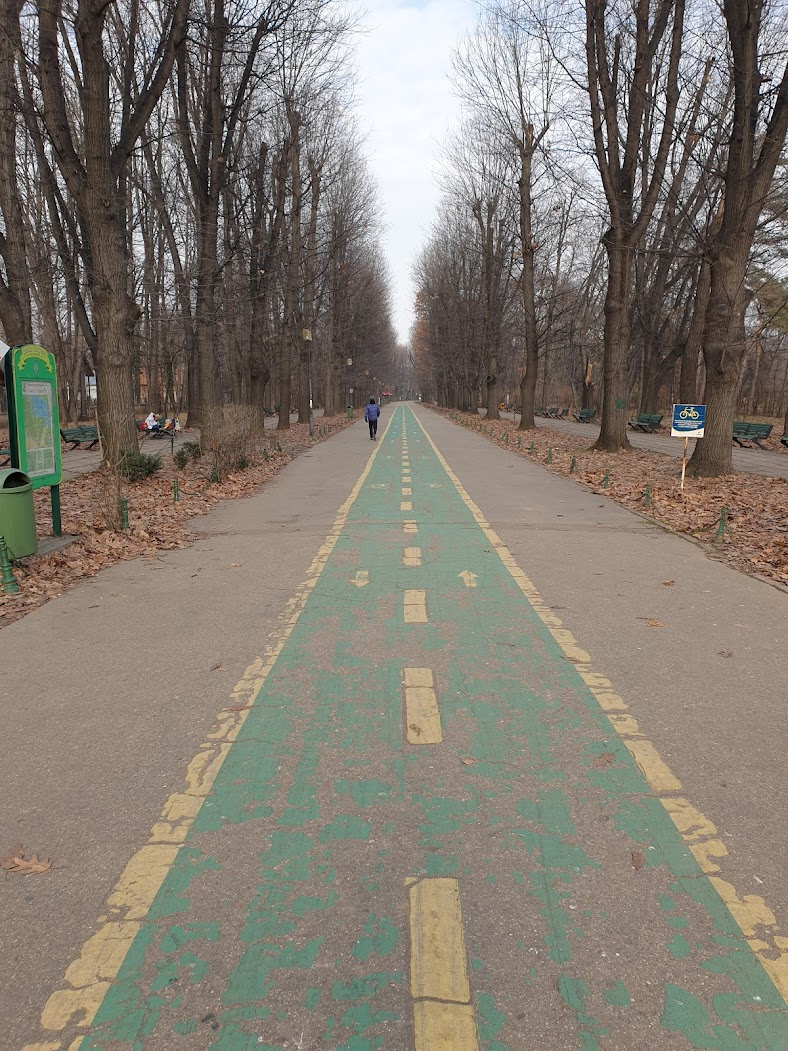
Cycle path in King Michael I Park

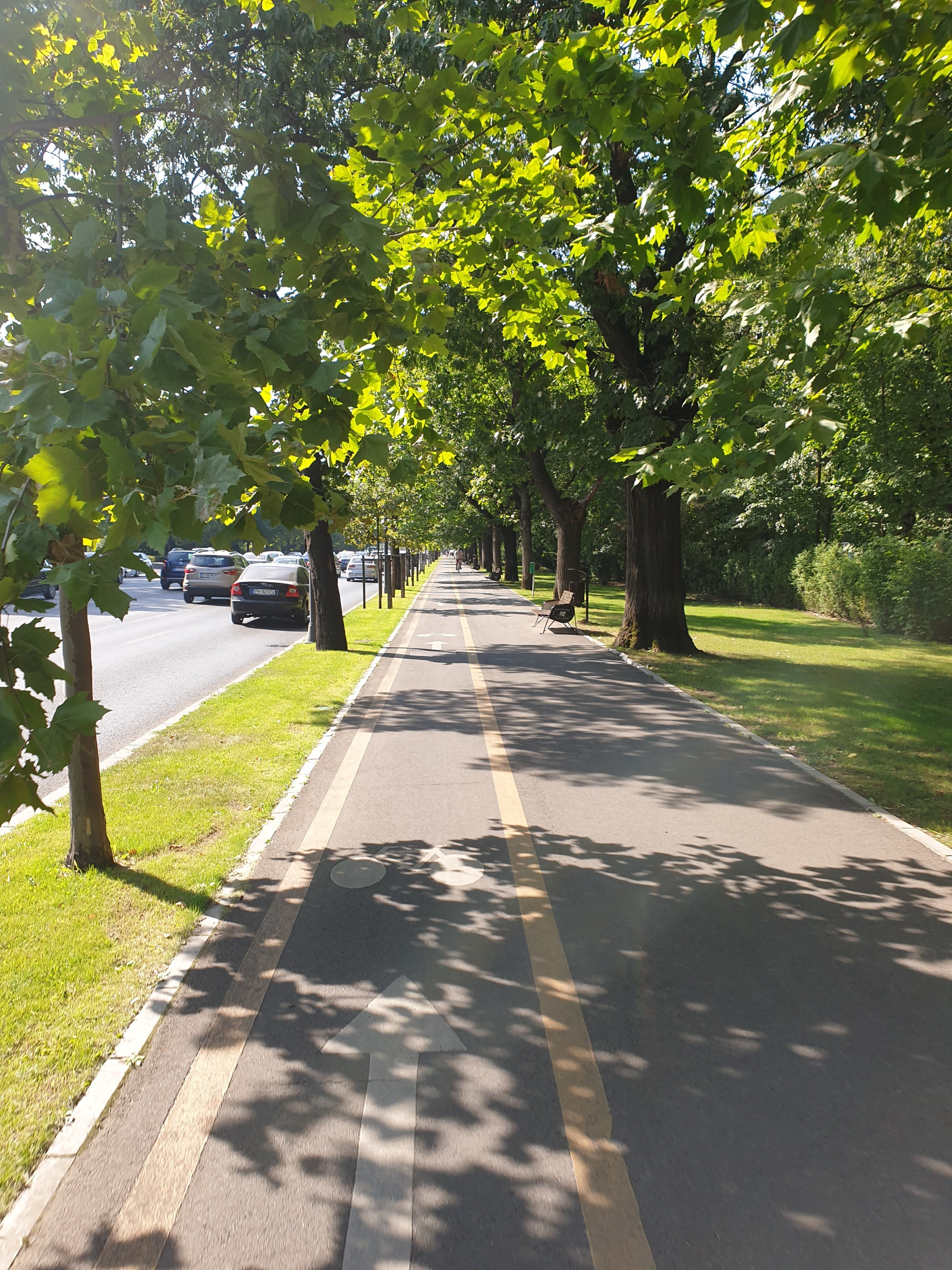
Cycle path on Mareșal Constantin Prezan Boulevard

The earliest segregated cycling paths were built in the 1970s in the Colentina district, along a 3-km stretch of Șoseaua Colentina between Obor and Colentina River. They were replaced in 2007 with parking spaces.

Between 2008–2010, the Bucharest City Hall built 122 km of cycling paths on the sidewalks of the city (mixing bicycle and pedestrian traffic), at a cost of 12 million €. They were closed down by the traffic police in 2012 as they were found to be illegal according to the traffic code.

Mayor of Bucharest Sorin Oprescu announced in March 2013 that he refuses to allow segregated cycling paths to be built on the roads, as he claims that the Romanian drivers are uncivilized and that he "doesn't want to count the dead people" due to traffic accidents. Oprescu also claimed that most cyclists don't even want any such cycling paths.

As a reaction to Oprescu's claim of cyclists not wanting segregated cycling paths, the Cyclist Community of Bucharest organized a protest under the slogan "we want [dedicated] paths on the road" on 23 March 2013, in which up to 3000 cyclists participated. An even larger protest was organized on 21 September 2013, when more than 5000 cyclists participated.

The result is a segregated cycling path in the central Calea Victoriei avenue.
