= Cycling at the 2010 South American Games – Women's cross-country =

The Women's Cross-Country event at the 2010 South American Games was held at 9:00 on March 23.

== Medalists ==
Gold	Silver	Bronze
Laura Abril; Colombia	Maria Elisa Jaramillo; Chile	Alexandra Serrano Rodriguez; Ecuador

== Results ==
Race distance: 30 km (7 laps)

Rank	Rider	Time	Time Behind	Speed
1st place, gold medalist(s)	Laura Abril (COL)	1:41:57		17.891
2nd place, silver medalist(s)	Maria Elisa Jaramillo (CHI)	1:48:47	+6:50	16.767
3rd place, bronze medalist(s)	Alexandra Serrano Rodriguez (ECU)	1:49:32	+7:35	16.652
4	Angela Parra (COL)	1:49:58	+8:01	16.586
5	Leila Luque (ARG)	–1 LAP		
6	Florenci Herrero (CHI)	–1 LAP		
7	Erika Gramiscelli (BRA)	–2 LAP		
8	Roberta Stopa (BRA)	–4 LAP		
9	Paula Quiros (ARG)	–6 LAP		
