= Danish Cycling Federation =

National governing body of cycle racing in Denmark

The Danish Cycling Federation or DCU (in Danish: Danmarks Cykle Union) is the national governing body of cycle racing in Denmark.

The DCU is a member of the UCI and the UEC.

== See also ==
- Cycling Embassy of Denmark
- Cycling in Denmark
- Cycling in Copenhagen
- Danish Cyclists Federation
- Outline of cycling
