= Cycling in Copenhagen =

Means of transportation in Copenhagen, Denmark

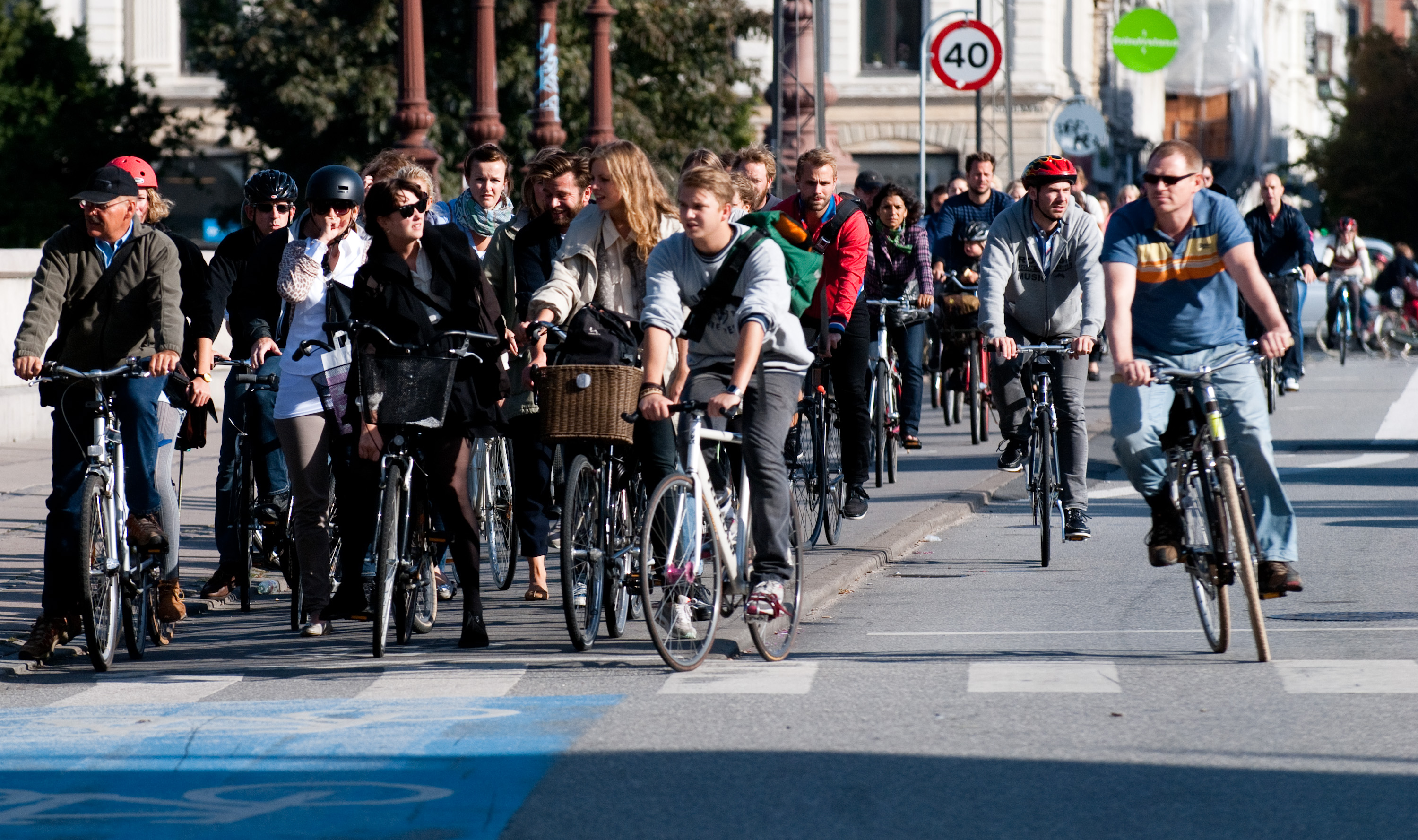
Rush hour in Copenhagen, where 62% of the population commute by bicycle to their work or study places each day

Cycling in Copenhagen is – as with most cycling in Denmark – a mode of transportation and a dominating feature of the cityscape, often noticed by visitors. The city offers a variety of cycling conditions — dense urban proximities, short distances and flat terrain — along with an extensive system of cycle tracks. This has earned it a reputation as one of the most bicycle-friendly cities in the world. Every day 1.2 million kilometres (0.75 million miles) are cycled in Copenhagen, with 62% of all inhabitants commuting to work, school, or university by bicycle; in fact, almost as many people commute by bicycle in greater Copenhagen as do those cycle to work in the entire United States. Cycling is generally perceived as a healthier, more environmentally friendly, cheaper, and often quicker way to get around town than by using an automobile.

== History ==
Bicycles became common in Copenhagen at the beginning of the twentieth century. The city's first bicycle path was established on Esplanaden in 1892, another early example are the paths established around The Lakes in 1910, when the existing bridle paths were converted into isolated cycleways to accommodate the heavy growth in cycling at the time. In 1890 there were 2,500 bicycles in the city, just 17 years later that figure had increased to 80,000. In the 1920s and 1930s the popularity increased even further. As a spectator sport, six-day racing became popular in the 1930s. The first race was held in 1934 in the original Forum Copenhagen and its popularity peaked in the 1960s. During World War II, petrol was strictly rationed, making cycling the dominant form of transportation in Copenhagen. Also during the 1940s, the first recreational bicycle routes were developed through green spaces in the periphery of the municipality.

Starting in the 1950s, Copenhagen experienced a decline in utility cycling due to increasing wealth and affordability of motor vehicles. While no bike paths were actually removed at the time, new road construction omitted bicycle infrastructure, and many bike lanes were curtailed at intersections to increase the throughput of cars by adding turn lanes and other car related infrastructure in its place. At the same time car traffic increased dramatically on existing streets without bicycle infrastructure, decreasing the cyclists sense of safety on those streets. During the late 1960s and early 1970s the modal share of bicycles fell to an all-time low of 10%.

By the 1970's Denmark had transitioned away from coal-powered energy and had become heavily dependent on cheap, foreign oil for energy use. The 1973 oil crisis thus hit Denmark harder than most countries, and the government was forced to ration petrol and introduce car-free Sundays to conserve oil reserves. Many city dwellers thought it was the best day of the week, and the Danish Cyclists Federation, which had been on life support for years, experienced a rapid and massive increase in membership during the 1970s and 1980s. This coincided with the growing environmental movement in the 1970s, and cycling experienced a renaissance.

Bolstered by the increasing membership and new enthusiastic younger grassroots, the Cyclists Federation organised massive demonstrations in Copenhagen and other major cities, demanding better infrastructure and safety for the city's cyclists. Another grassroots action cited for putting cycling infrastructure on the political agenda was operation "White Crosses" where white crosses were painted on the streets where a cyclist had been killed in traffic. These events came at the same time as a number of planning reforms were initiated nationally, which gave individual residents the opportunity to have direct influence on new planning and zoning laws in their communities, and with that came a clear demand for segregated cycle paths.

Although the first separate cycle tracks were constructed much earlier, they did not become the norm until the early 1980s. As in many other cities planners suggested avoiding interference with car traffic on main roads, by using a "back streets strategy" of cycling routes on quiet residential streets, but uptake was low and the vast majority of cyclists refused to deviate from the more direct routes. Protests continued and on 4 June 1983 the Danish Cycling Federation, at a large bicycle demonstration, gave a "Cyclist Award" to Jens Kramer Mikkelsen in the form of a two-metre-long (6.6 ft) curb. Mikkelsen was the head of the traffic department and later lord mayor. The curb was placed on the bike lane on Amagerbrogade at the corner of Hollænderdybet. The gift was a symbol of the bicycle federations desire to have segregated bicycle facilities build on direct corridors, which happened to be along major streets, in order to make bicycle journeys competitive in time and effort. Politicians, although not very eager, gradually took up building cycle tracks on main roads and also began to develop the first coordinated strategies for increasing cycling in the municipality.

Since 1995, when the city started its monitoring system, cycling has constantly risen, reaching 41% by 2004 and 50% by 2010 for people living within the city of Copenhagen. In the 18 municipalities that make up the Copenhagen metropolitan region (Hovedstadsområdet) an area of approximately 350 square kilometres (140 sq mi) and a population of 1,2 million, 21% of all trips were done on bicycle by 2011. During the same period, from the 1980s until today, the network of cycle tracks and paths within the city of Copenhagen has almost doubled in length reaching 397 kilometres (247 mi) in 2010

== Municipal bicycle policy ==
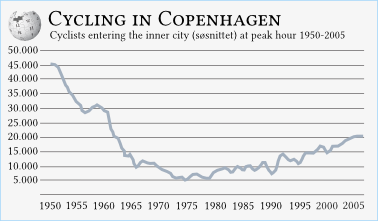

The city of Copenhagen released its first bicycle report in 1996, where the city for the first time began measuring 10 key indicators, chosen by the city's traffic department and a group of regular cyclists. Aside from factual information like the budget allocated to cycling infrastructure, the length of the bicycle network, modal share and the number of cyclists and accident statistics, it also contains surveys asking regular cyclists for their opinion on the infrastructure, maintenance, and their perceived sense of safety. It gives residents an overview of the city's plans for cycling and, in later renditions, changes initiated since the previous account's publication. The city of Copenhagen has since released its bicycle report biennially, greatly increasing its scope in later editions.

In the municipal development plan from 1997, the city introduced a new concept of green bicycle routes, envisioned to be a coherent network of cycle routes that, to the extent possible, would be off-street routes through parks and other open green areas or, where that is not possible, to a limited extent along quiet streets with low traffic volumes. These routes were intended to supplement the existing network centred around busy corridors with high volume vehicle traffic. In 2000 the city released a proposal for a network of 22 green bicycle routes with a total length of 110 kilometres (68 mi) at a total estimated cost of 500 million DKK. As of 2012 around 40 km of network has been completed and the city is committed to completing the network in the coming years. The city hopes that the recreational and enhanced safety qualities of this network will attract certain groups of the population that currently use cars on trips to and from work, especially those with a 5–10 km commute.

In 2001 Copenhagen formulated its first bicycle strategy with the publishing of Cycle Policy 2002 – 2012 as a way to prioritize cycling in city planning, signal its importance to the city, and to coordinate initiatives for improvements of cycling conditions. The city also vowed to use bicycle reports to follow up on the goals set forth the cycle policy. Among these goals were an increase in modal share from 34% to 40%, a 50% decrease serious injuries or death, as well as targets for safety, comfort, and speed, measured in the surveys for the bicycle report.

The next development of the municipal bicycle policy came with the release of the Cycle Track Priority Plan 2006–2016 which states the order in which almost 70 kilometres (43 mi) of new cycle tracks and cycle lanes will be established in the 10 years covered by plan. The expansion of the bicycle network are prioritized by a number of indicators: the number of cyclists, accidents, sense of safety, coherence in the network and coordination with other projects done by the city. In 2009 the estimated cost of implementing the plan was DKK 400 million.

In 2007, following a report on the effects of cycle tracks and bicycle lanes that identified a number of problems with the safety of the network, particularly in intersections, the city approved and released an Action Plan for Safe Bicycle Traffic 2007–2012 to aid the city with the goal of reducing the number of accidents by 50% compared to 1996. The plan called for rebuilding streets and intersections throughout the city and identified 20 especially dangerous intersections in the city that would be rebuilt at a rate of 3 per year. It also called for safety and behavioural campaigns and strengthening the city's traffic department.

=== Current bicycle strategy (2011–2025) ===
On 1 December 2011 the municipal council unanimously adopted the new cycling strategy, "good, better, best – The City of Copenhagen's Bicycle Strategy 2011–2025" which aims to make Copenhagen the world's best city to cycle in. The strategy replaces the previous cycling policy covering the years 2002 to 2012. To reach its goal, the city has chosen to focus on four core areas; city life, comfort, speed and safety

The main goal of the strategy is to increase the modal share of the bicycle to 50% of commuter trips, and make Copenhagen the best cycling city in the world. The city has used the biennial bicycle reports to identify key problems that need to be addressed in order to increase the modal share, and plans employing a number of tools to reach its target. These include widening cycle tracks to 3 lanes to allow for conversational cycling and increase the sense of safety on the cycle tracks, while at the same time allowing for higher speeds among commuters. The city further plans to decrease travel times by expanding the use of green waves adjusted to cycling speeds, and building additional bicycle and pedestrian only bridges across busy streets and over the harbour and canals. The city also plans to increase safety by redesigning a number of intersections with a high number of accidents, and rebuilding school routes with safer infrastructure, and speed decreasing measures. Finally the strategy also aims to improve the chaotic bicycle parking conditions, by greatly expanding the number of parking spaces, especially in and around stations.

==== Targets ====
- Relative to 2010, cyclists' travel time is reduced by 15%
- 50% of all trips to work and school in Copenhagen is done on bicycles (2010: 35%)
- Relative to 2005, the number of seriously injured cyclists will fall by 70%
- 80% of cyclists find the cycle tracks well maintained (2010: 50%)
- 80% of Copenhageners think that bicycle culture positively affects the city's atmosphere (2010: 67%)
- 90% of cyclists feel safe cycling in traffic (2010: 67%)

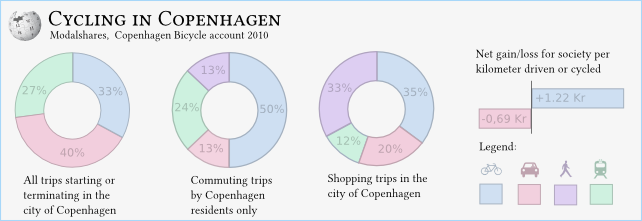

== Impact ==
=== Health and welfare ===
The Copenhagen City Heart Study involved 19,698 Copenhagen inhabitants aged 20–100 years in a cardiovascular population study and concluded that cycling at high or average speed increases life expectancy of the participants by 5 and 3 years respectively compared to those who cycle at low speed (4 and 2 respectively for women).

Since the health care system in Denmark is both universal and tax payer funded, a major driver in the economics of bicycle promotion and investments, comes from savings in the health care system. One study has shown a decrease in mortality of 30% among adults who commute by bicycle daily. And the city estimates that for each kilometre cycled society saves 1.21 DKK in the health care system, added up that amounts to approximately DKK 534 million (US$91 million) of savings per year, in addition society gains from increased productivity of a healthier workforce. Other savings come from reduced congestion and lower road infrastructure maintenance costs.

=== Economic impact ===
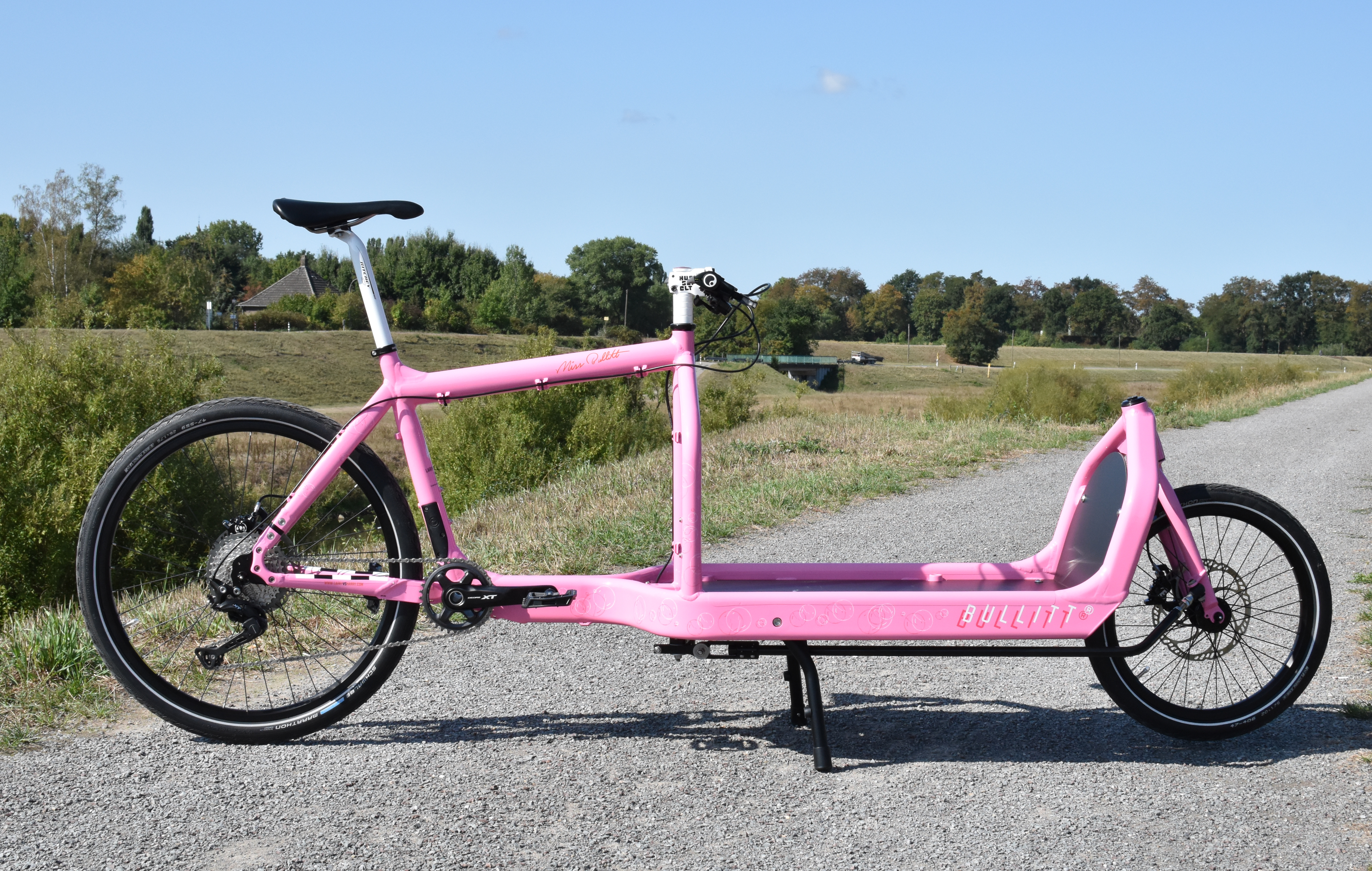
Deep front loading cargo bicycle Bullitt since 2008 by Larry vs. Harry, Copenhagen (2018)

Copenhagen's bicycle culture brings both direct and derived economic benefits to the city. The city estimates that every kilometre cycled brings a net gain for society of 1.22 DKK (US$0.21 per mile), compared to a net loss of 0.69 DKK for every kilometre driven in a car (US$0.12 per mile). These numbers include both savings in the public sector, and additional economic activity in the private sector.

In the private sector there are 289 bicycle shops and wholesale dealers in greater Copenhagen, as well as 20 companies that design and sell bicycles, mainly the city's signature cargo bikes, such as Christiania Bikes (Boxcycles in the U.S.), Nihola and Larry vs Harry (Bullitt), and luxury bike brands as Biomega and Velorbis. These firms generate 650 full-time jobs and a total estimated annual turnover of DKK 1.3 billion (US$222 million).

Add to this the various forms of utility cycling in the city and specialized consultancy services, provided both partly by the public sector though the city itself and the cycling embassy to promote private sector solutions internationally, but also directly by private sector consultants, most notably Copenhagenize Consulting and Gehl Architects. The tourism sector is also regarded to both receive and provide additional economic benefits to the city. There are many bicycle rental shops which mainly cater to visitors and there are also a number of agencies providing bicycle tours of Copenhagen, creating additional jobs and economic activity. In addition, the positive branding effect of Copenhagen's bicycle culture is estimated to attract international conferences and hotel guests, although the city finds it difficult to assign a precise economic value to the positive branding of Copenhagen as a cycling city.

=== Utility cycling ===
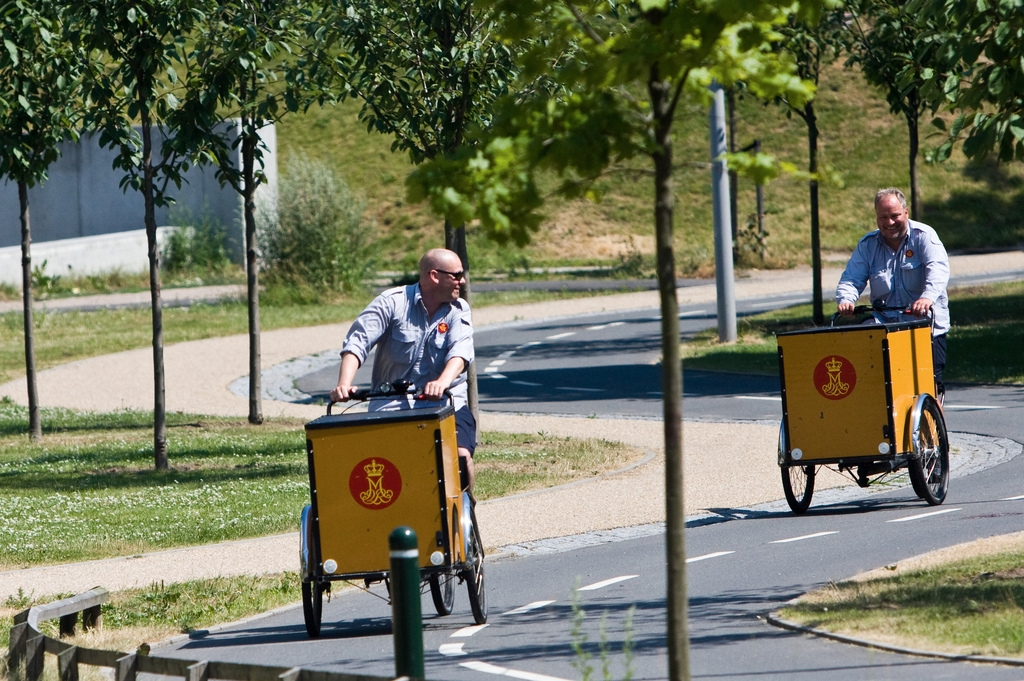
The Danish postal service delivers virtually all mail in Copenhagen by bicycle

Several companies operate cycle rickshaws (velotaxis) in Copenhagen. While the business is currently unregulated, it is estimated that there were around 130 cycle taxis in Copenhagen in 2012. Recently the city has proposed organising the system in the inner medieval city with 26 designated bicycle taxi stands and require permits for their operation in order to address some of the problems created by their popularity. They offer similar advantages to taxis for passengers travelling shorter journeys, and their novelty attracts tourists including those seeking a guided tour of the city centre.

Following a liberalization in 2007, several entrepreneurs have jumped the opportunity and started to sell goods from custom build cargo bikes. Walking through the city you will find vendors selling hot coffee, chocolate, soup and pancakes from cargo bikes with gas stoves installed, cooled sushi and cocktails or pedal blended smoothies. As with the cycle taxis, there are now so many vendors that the city has started to limit their access to some parts of the city, where they, along with the bicycle taxis, have created access problems for pedestrians.

As in many other cities, another common phenomenon is bicycle messengers. A unique Copenhagen twist on the business that has been making rounds in the news and blogosphere is the famous custom build semen delivery bike from a local sperm bank. In addition, virtually all mail delivered by the Danish postal service is done on custom build bicycles, recently the company has introduced larger and more efficient electric cargo bikes, which won the "Innovation of the Year" prize at the annual post expo in 2012.

Since 1 March 2009, Copenhagen has had police patrolling on bicycles. Besides being a quick and efficient means of transportation, it has been found to increase visibility and to improve contact with citizens. Other professions using cycling in their everyday work in Copenhagen include municipal supportive home caretakers who are required to be proficient bicyclists to be hired, the city also employs a large number of Street sweepers on specially build cargo bikes, and certain departments of the municipal administration requires certain trips, e.g. between meetings to be done by bicycle or foot, in accordance with the city's climate plan.

== Infrastructure ==
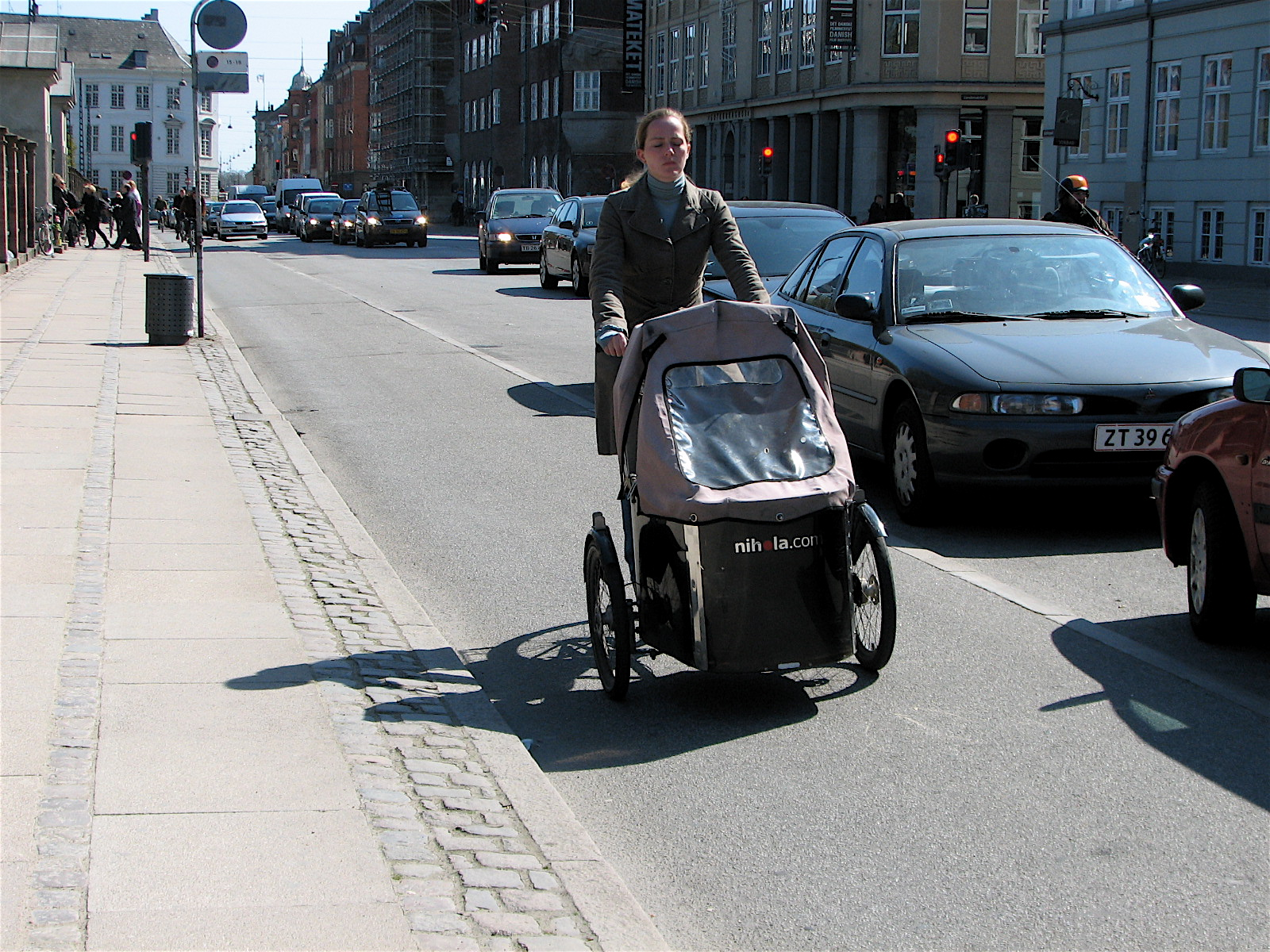
Typical design: The cycle track runs next to the sidewalk. Cars park on the side of the roadway.

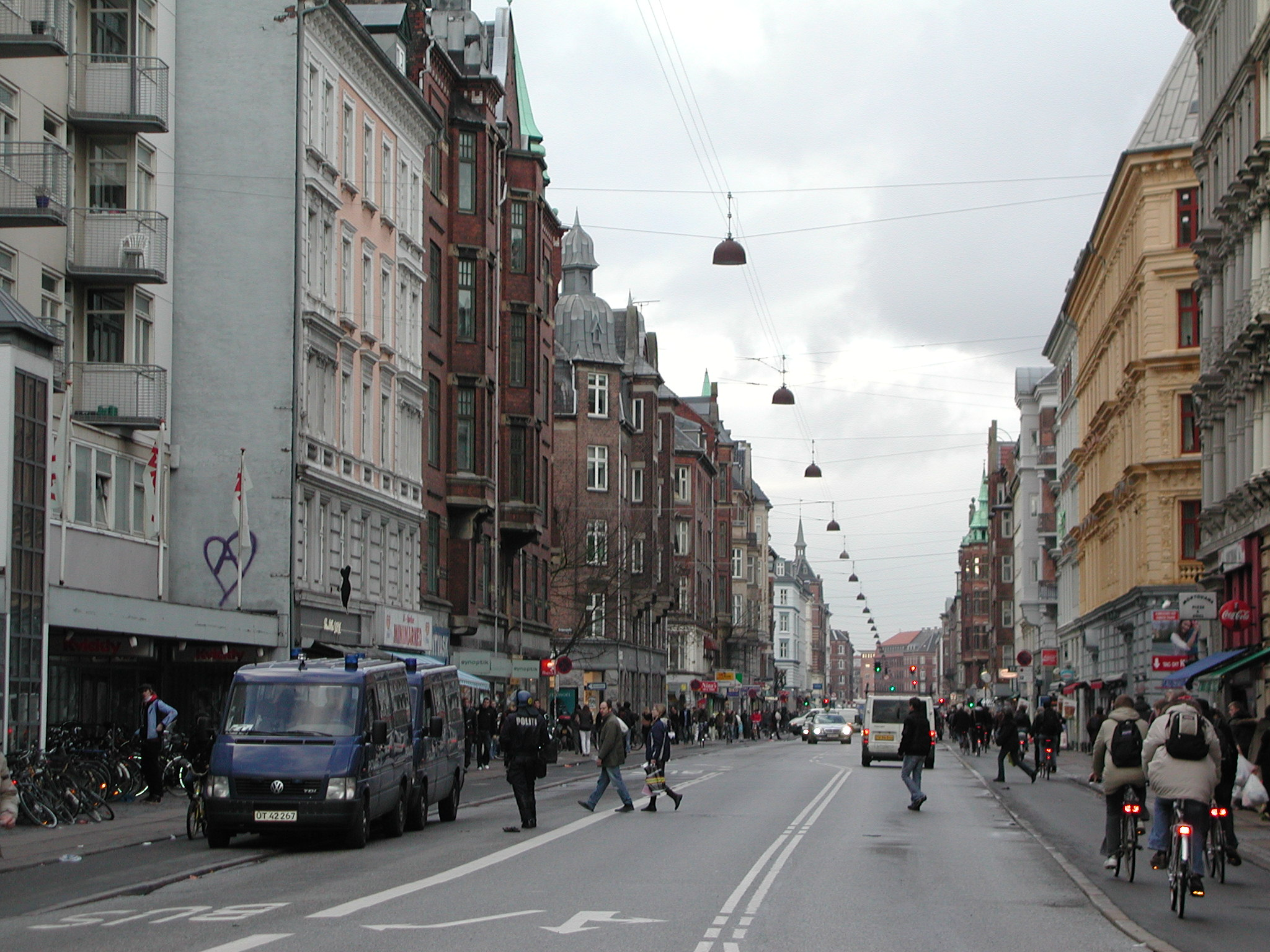
Typical design: Two unidirectional cycle tracks. Limited by two curbs, their level is between that of the sidewalk and that of the roadway.

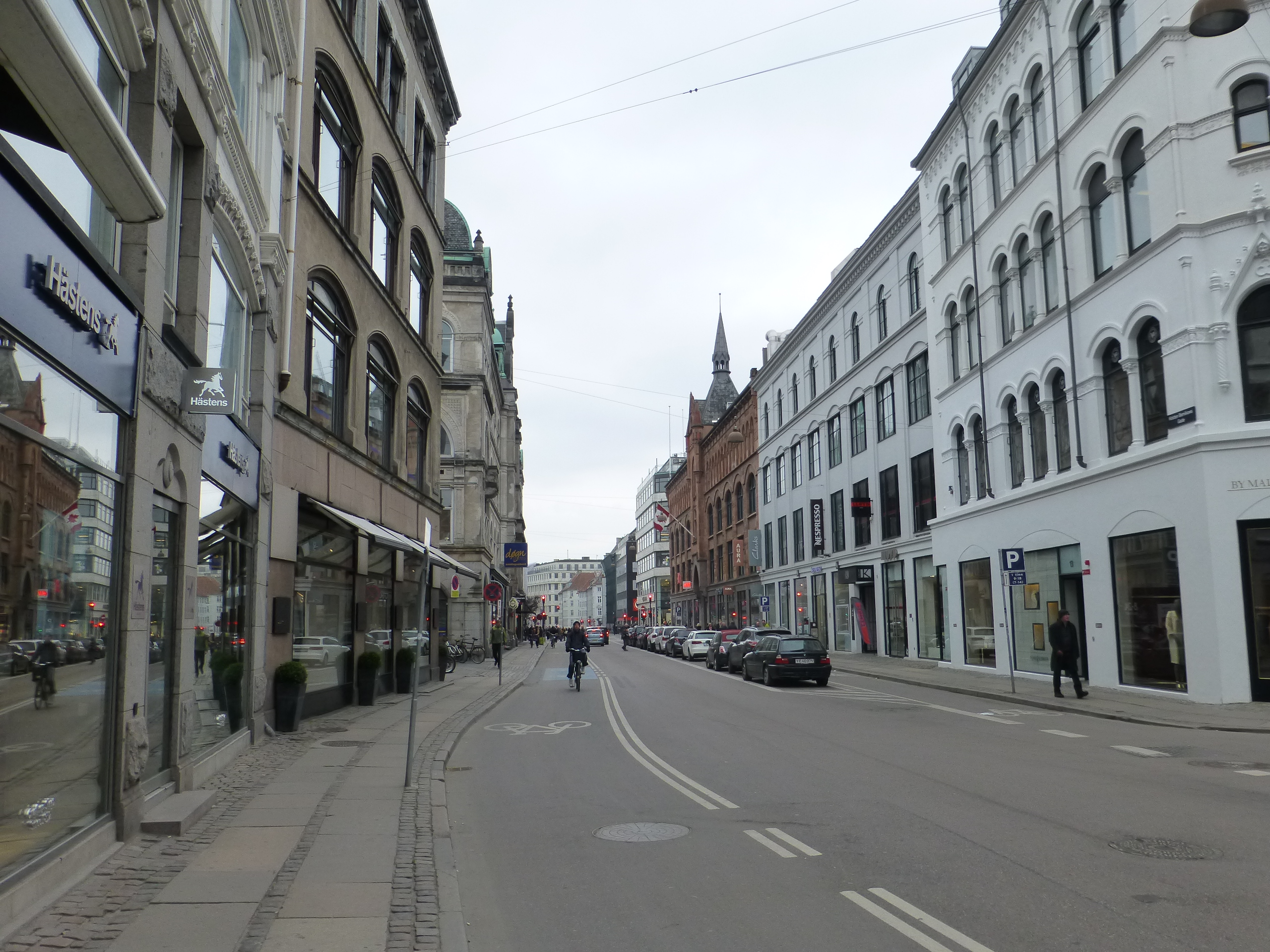
Some streets have bike lanes on roadway level

Bicycle infrastructure in Copenhagen currently includes approximately 350 kilometres (220 mi) of curb segregated cycle tracks, 23 kilometres (14 mi) of on-street cycle lanes and 43 kilometres (27 mi) of off-street green bicycle routes running through parks and other green areas. In relation, Bremen with a very similar amount of population has 700 kilometres (430 mi) of curb segregated cycle tracks, but only a bit above 26% cycle traffic. According to the cycle track priority plan, the city of Copenhagen plans to expand this by 70 kilometres (43 mi) of cycle tracks and 67 kilometres (42 mi) of green bicycle routes by 2026 before it deems the network complete. The city allocated some DKK 75 million (approx. US$13M) to new or improved bike specific infrastructure and DKK 17 million (approx. US$2.3M) on operation and maintenance of the network in the 2013 budget.

It is worth noting that the contiguous urban area releases no unified statistics, and hence the size of network is considerably larger than most statistics show, since they cover only Copenhagen municipality itself, rather than the 18 municipalities that constitute the urban core of the capital region. The city of Frederiksberg for example includes an additional 55 kilometres (34 mi) of cycle track and paths and actually has the highest modal share in the country, exceeding that of the city of Copenhagen which surrounds it. Additionally, the suburban Albertslund Municipality has a unique network of 83 kilometres (52 mi) separated alignments with level-free crossings through around 130 bridges and tunnels.

=== Cycle tracks ===
==== Roadside tracks ====
Roadside cycle tracks in Copenhagen are generally one-directional (see Google Maps' orthophotos), with one cycle track on each side of street flowing the same direction as motor traffic. Legally, the minimum width is 1.7 metres (5.6 ft), but in practice most cycle tracks are at least 2.2 metres (7.2 ft), preferably 2.5 metres (8.2 ft), and very busy stretches of cycle tracks can be 3–4 metres (9.8–13.1 ft) wide. Cycle tracks in Copenhagen are separated from car lanes by a 7–9-centimetre (2.8–3.5 in) high stone curb and the sidewalk by another 5–9-centimetre (2.0–3.5 in) curb. They are by and large of a uniform design, in order to give cyclists a good idea of what any particular route will look like. Where roadside parking is available cycle tracks run on the inside of the row of parked cars, between parking and the sidewalk, essentially using parked cars as a separation barrier between bicycles and vehicle traffic. As most cars are single occupancy, this also aids to prevent dooring accidents, as the driver exits the car on the opposite side of the cycle track.

==== Independent bikeways ====
A few spectacular bikeways are not adjacent to streets. Nørrebroruten is a dedicated bike route on an abandoned railway track and so has few road crossings. Cykelslangen ("Bikesnake") is a viaduct, partly across and partly longitudinal above port basins. Therefore, both are among the rare bidirectional bikeways inside Copenhagen.

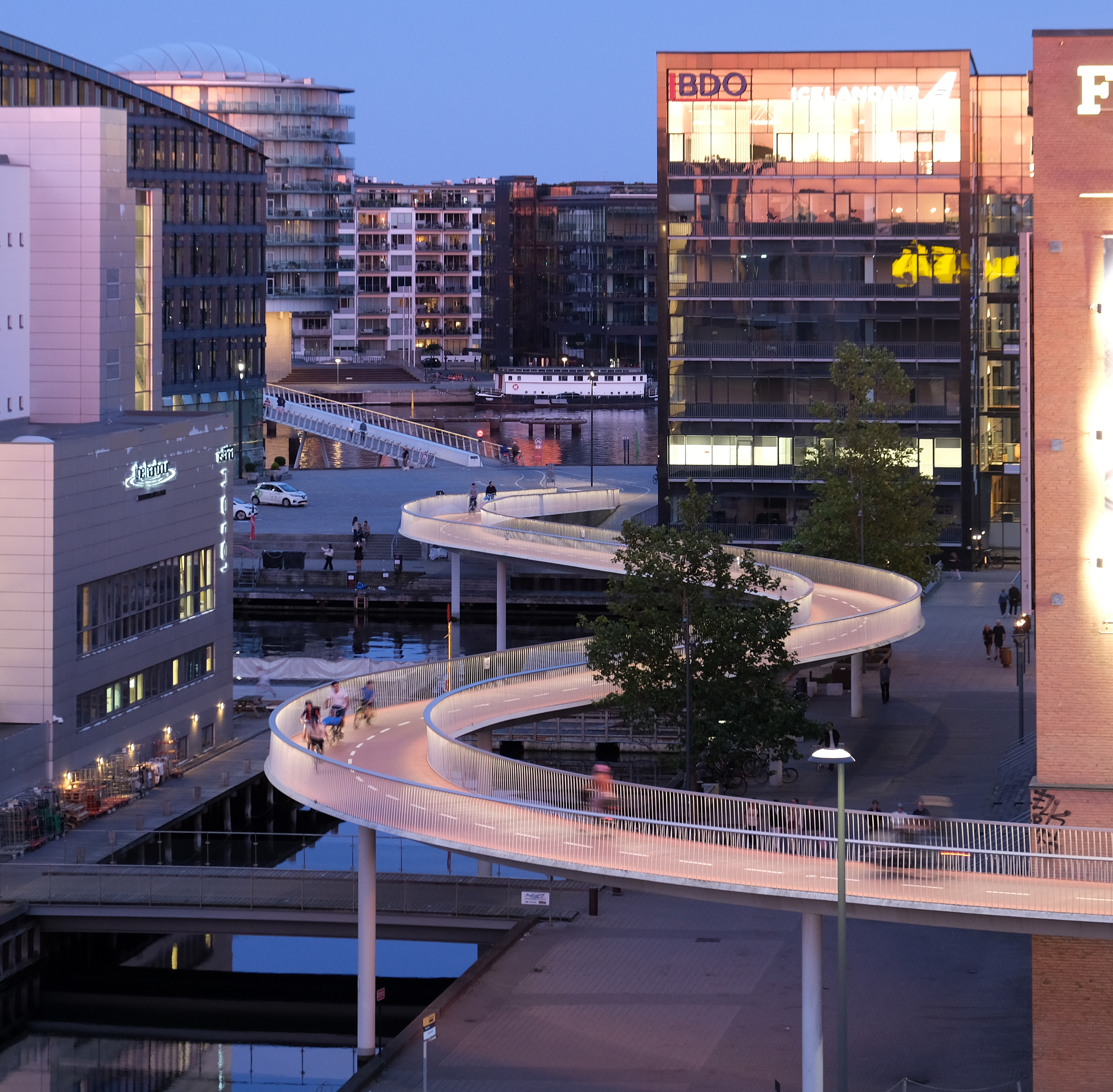
Cykelslangen, a dedicated cycling viaduct (near Dybbølsbro station)

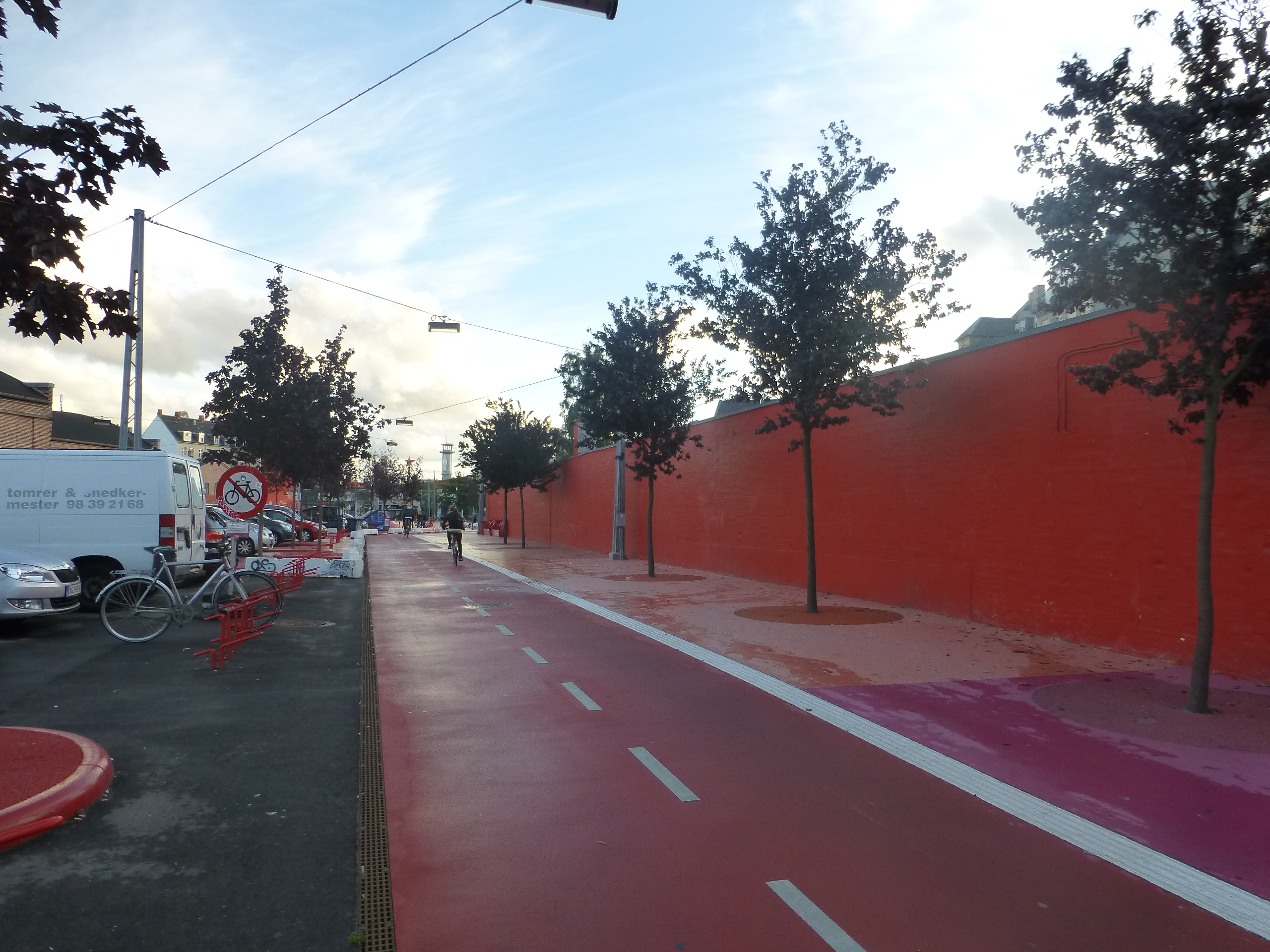
Nørrebroruten, over a former railroad track, and is usually separated from other roadways.

==== Safety ====
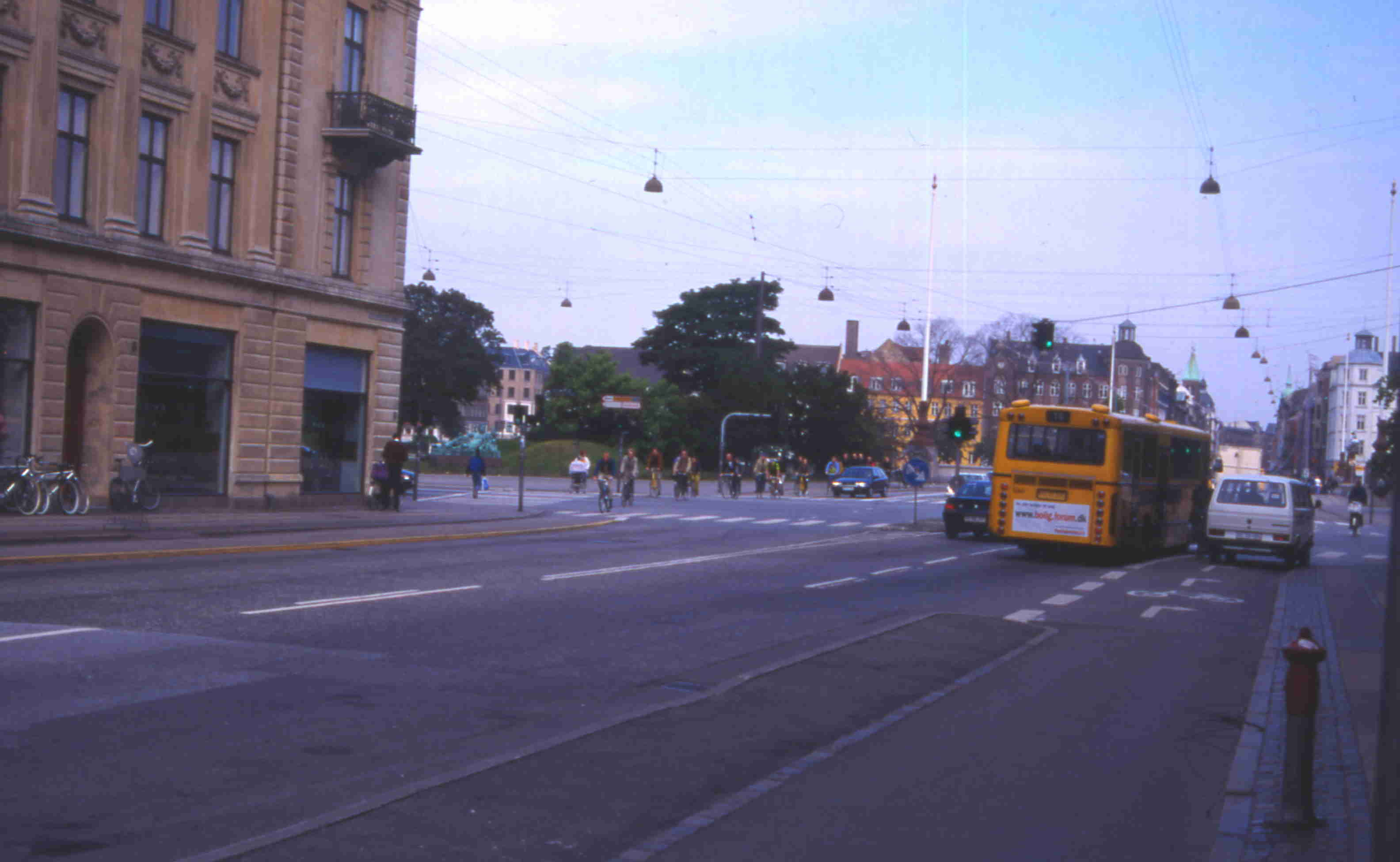
To reduce crashes caused by car drivers turning right without yielding to cyclists on their right (right hooks), the cycle track sometimes merges with the lane for cars turning right before intersections.

While installation of a new cycle track in the city decreases the number of accidents along the cycle track itself beyond the expected number of accidents, a study of newly installed bicycle tracks in Copenhagen actually showed, taking into account correction factors for crash trends, traffic volumes and regression-to-the-mean, that the number of accidents increased by 9% compared to the expected number of accidents (without new cycle path). There was a significant increase of accidents in intersections following the installation of cycle tracks at intersections when corrected for traffic volumes. Since its publication, the city has used the conclusions of the report to improve safety in intersections. Notable improvements include rebuilding dangerous intersections, pulling back stop lines for cars to improve visibility of cyclists, and expanding the use of bicycle traffic lights, to give pre-greens for cyclists. Overall there were 92 cyclists involved serious injury and 3 deaths in 2010, down from 252 incidents in 1996, when the city began a concerted effort to bring down the number of injuries. A cyclist will now on average cycle 4.4 million kilometres (2.7 million miles) before being involved in a serious accident.

==== Super bikeways ====
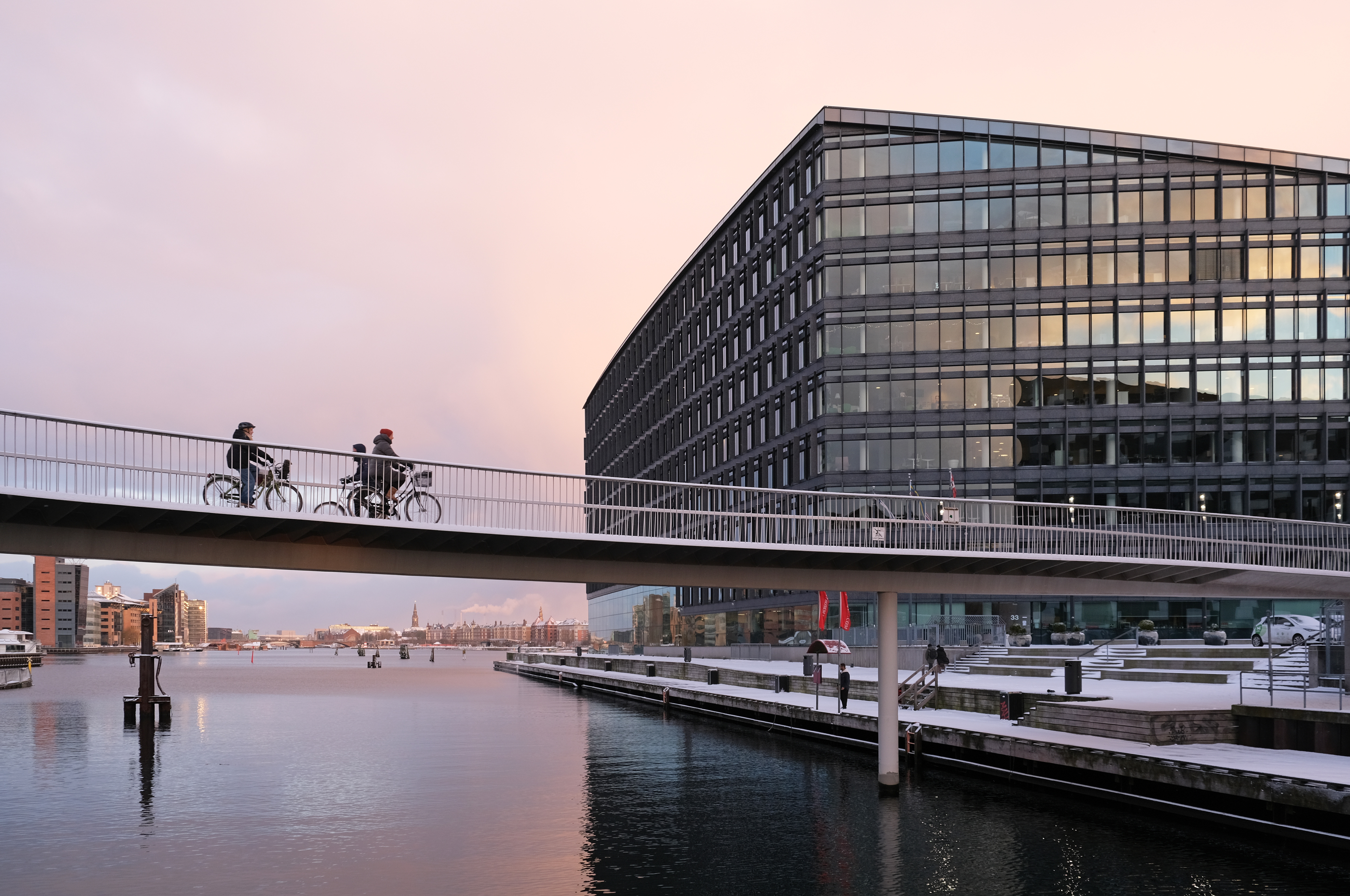
Cykelslangen as seen from Fisketorvet, 2026

The Cycle Super Highways are a series of bike paths that connect Copenhagen to nearby suburbs. This initiative began in 2009 when both Copenhagen and the neighboring cities realized that building new infrastructure would allow commuters to bike into the city and create more sustainable transportation options. Since traffic planners believe it will be very difficult to raise the modal share substantially beyond the current 50% for its own residents, the city has begun targeting commuters entering the city from surrounding municipalities on trips in the 5–15-kilometre (3.1–9.3 mi) range, aiming to increase the number of bicycle commuters by 30% throughout the capital region. The project involves a 500-kilometre (310 mi) network of 26 named and signposted routes following a uniform standard with high maintenance and good services such as automatic air-pumps and prioritized snow removal. While international media has created some hyperbole around the concept, labelling the network as bicycle superhighways, they are largely not grade separated. Rather the routes are regular cycle tracks receiving smaller targeted upgrades.

=== Cycle parking ===
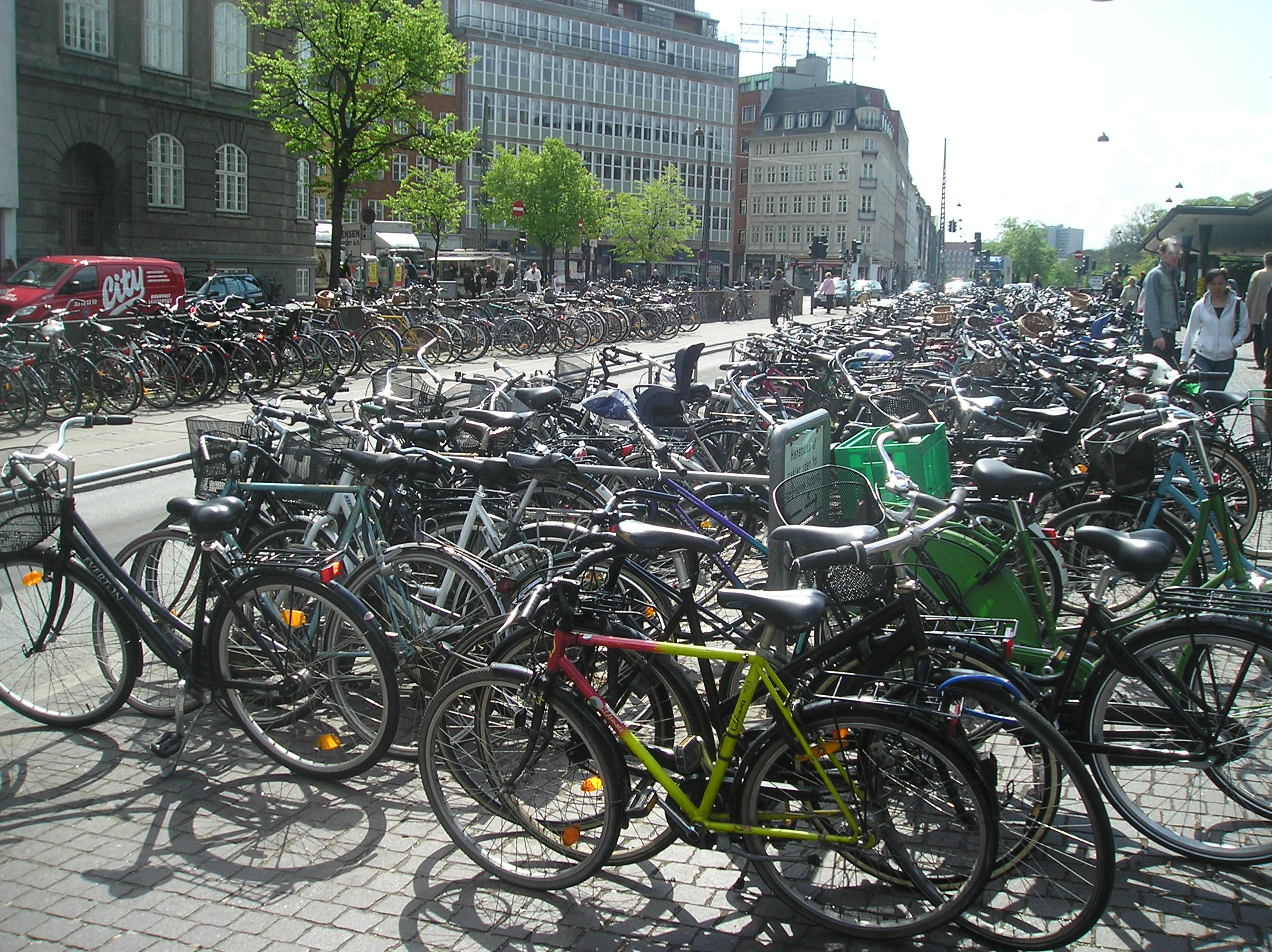
Parking bicycles near Nørreport Station

Although visitors may be surprised by the apparently large number of cycle parking facilities in Copenhagen, there is in fact a severe lack of available cycle stands, and among the subjective indicators measured by the city, bicycle parking fares worst, with only 29% being satisfied with the facilities. There are approximately 560.000 bicycles in the city of Copenhagen, more bicycles than people, yet they share only 48.000 bicycle stands. With a view to remedying the situation, in 2008 the Danish Cyclists Federation published a "Bicycling Parking Manual" with a number of guidelines. They are of immediate practical use to today's users but they also offer advice for city planners wishing to improve facilities in the future. A number of projects have been launched to ease Copenhagen's notorious shortage of bicycle parking spaces, particularly at transport hubs. While the city expects there will always be more bicycles in Copenhagen than parking spots, it hopes to increase satisfaction with bicycle parking significantly by 2025, through a coordinated effort to improve conditions and facilities.

=== Integration ===
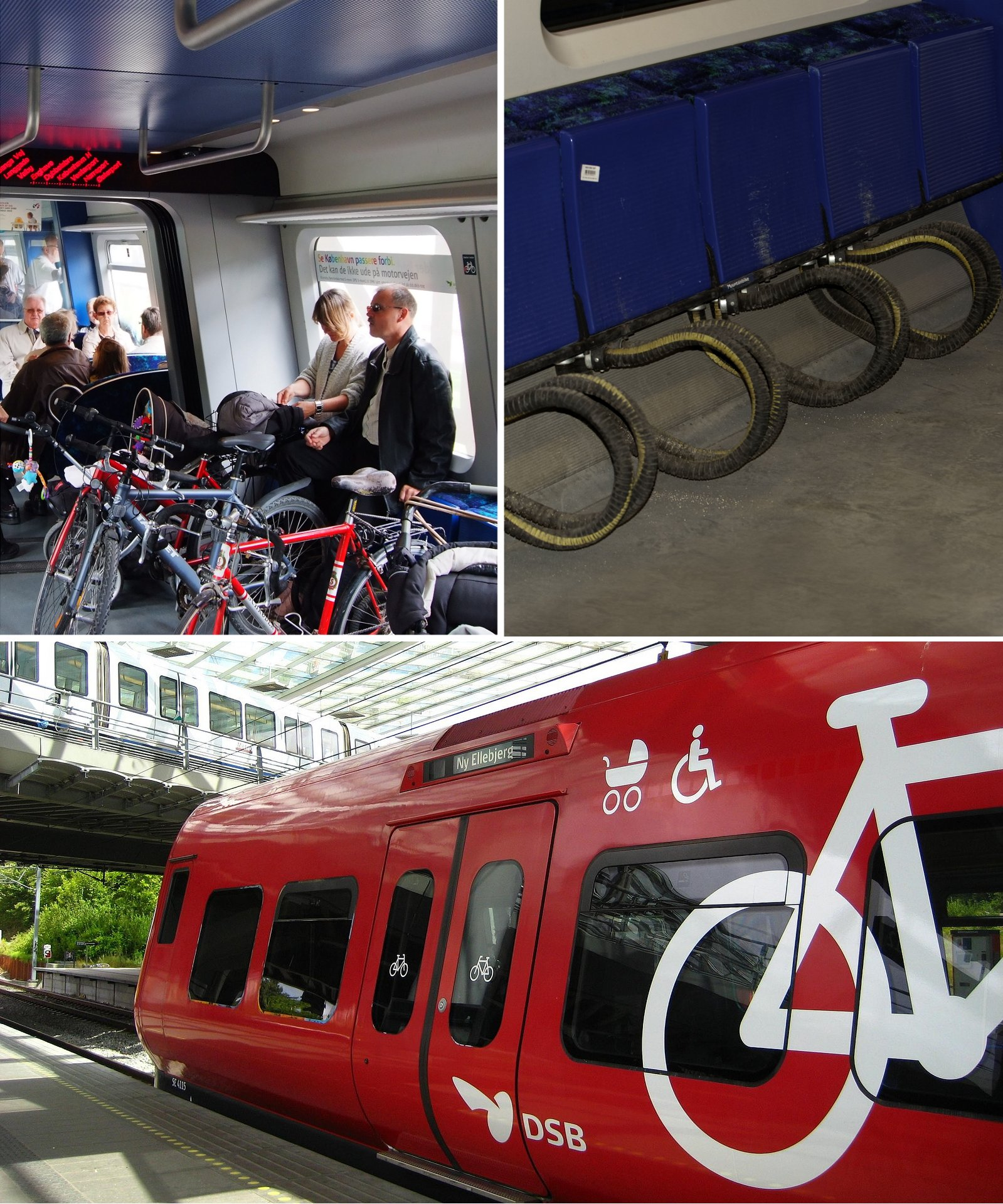
Bicycle integration in the S-train system

Bicycles have been admitted on the city's train network for some time to facilitate mixed-mode commuting, and in 2010, the state railways (DSB), made it free to bring bicycles on the train. Since then the number of passengers bringing a bicycle on the train have more than tripled, growing from 2.1 million to 7.3 million in 2012. To accommodate the growing number of bikes, DSB rebuilt all their S-trains by adding an extra carriage specifically for bikes, while keeping the flexible compartments at each end of the train to accommodate bicycles, as well as prams and wheelchairs, and increased capacity from 22 to 46 bicycles per train. Building on the success, DSB has launched additional bicycle initiatives such as opening bike shops in 10 stations, where customers can leave bikes for repair on their morning commute and retrieve them on their way home. The company has also introduced various bicycle discounts in their loyalty programme, vowed to install ramps on all stairs and drastically expand bicycle parking at stations.

Other trains serving the metropolitan area, including the metro, also accept bikes. Bicycles are permitted on the city's water buses, known as the Copenhagen Harbour Buses, and since 2011 it has also been possible to bring bicycles on the city's network of commuter express buses, labelled S-Buses, but unlike the S-train they levy a fee of DKK 12 (approx. USD 2), and only commuter trains — along with the S-trains — are exempt from a rush hour curfew. In addition 15% of train passengers in the metropolitan region cycle to the station. Taxis are required by law to carry a bike rack, and passengers can bring a bicycle for a small fee.

==== Public bicycles ====
Copenhagen currently offers Bycyklen, a bicycle sharing system which launched on 1 April 2014 with electric bicycles equipped with a GPS routing device. Unlike its predecessor, Copenhagen City Bikes, this system is not free.

While Copenhagen City Bikes was considered one of the first examples of modern bike share systems, it was also of little or no use to commuters, and was mainly seen as serving tourists and casual users since it was primarily designed to prevent bike theft. This was set to change with the city's new bike share system opening in 2013, to be designed specifically for commuters, in order to function as a range extender for the public transit system. With that in mind, the cities of Copenhagen and Frederiksberg appointed the operator of the S-train system, DSB to both tender and subsequently run the system. In 2013, a new system, Bycyklen, provided by Gobike was established, once fully installed it was planned to provide 1,260 modern bikes with aluminium frame, adjustable seat-height and GPS-guidance. As of December 2022 they are no longer operating.

== Influence ==
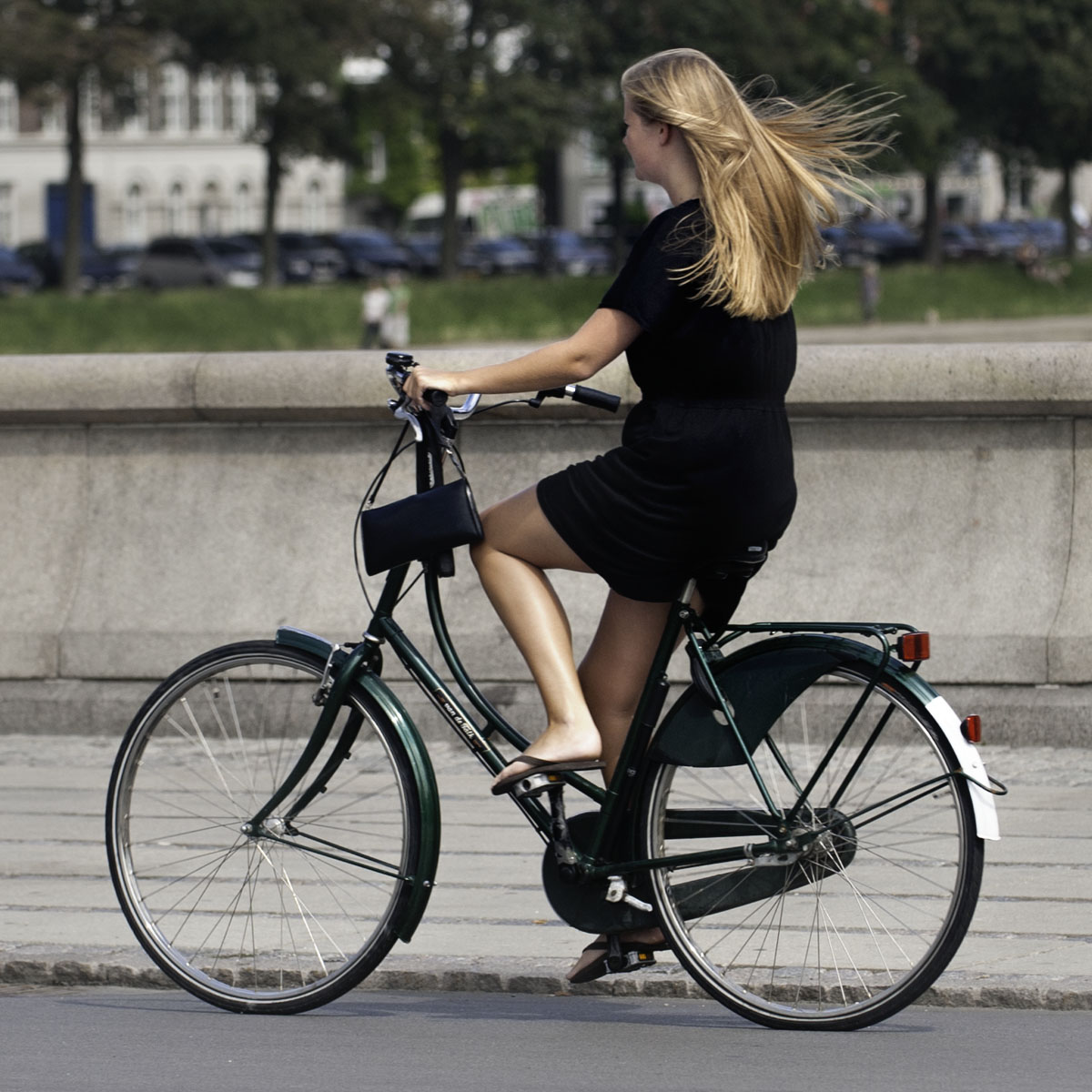
Cycle chic in Copenhagen

Copenhagen's relatively well-developed bicycle culture has given rise to the term Copenhagenization. This is the practice where other cities try to follow the example Copenhagen has set in recent decades, by moving from their own (often long-held) car-centric transport policies to those that attempt to greatly increase the number of journeys by bicycle; they do this by developing bicycle infrastructure and/or improving their current bicycle infrastructure just as Copenhagen has done and continues to do. An example of a city which has introduced bike lanes acknowledging inspiration from Copenhagen is Melbourne in Australia where kerbside bike lanes separated from moving and parked cars by a low concrete kerb are referred to as 'Copenhagen lanes'. The concept of Copenhagenization has been featured by CNNs Richard Quest in the Futures Cities series and on Al Jazeera's Earthrise series.

In 2007 Copenhagen-based Danish urban design consultant Jan Gehl was hired by the New York City Department of Transportation to re-imagine New York City streets by introducing designs to improve life for pedestrians and cyclists. In this connection, Gehl took NYC planning chief Amanda Burden and transportation czar Janette Sadik-Khan on a bike trip around Copenhagen to show them what could be done for New York. Former British transport minister Andrew Adonis has also cycled the streets of Copenhagen in search of inspiration. As a result of Russian president Dmitri Medvedev's favorable impressions of Copenhagen's biking system during his visit to Denmark, 14 city bikes were sent to St Petersburg at the beginning of June 2010 where they will be available on an experimental basis. Medvedev believes the city bike approach could reduce traffic congestion in the city. The Danish pavilion at the 2010 World Expo in Shanghai had been specially designed by BIG Architects. It allowed visitors to gain experience of cycling in Copenhagen by taking one of its 300 city bikes along the cycle paths which were incorporated throughout the structure. and city has since signed its first sister cities agreement with Beijing with a major goal of the cooperation being to provide inspiration to Beijing on how it can reintroduce the bicycle as a major mode of transport in the city.

Another influence on bicycle culture from Copenhagen is the "cycle chic" movement. It grew from reactions to a photo of a girl wearing her regular clothes on a bike, which inspired the photographer, Michael Colville-Andersen, to start the blog Copenhagen Cycle Chic featuring mainly female subjects riding their bikes in fashionable everyday clothes. Its popularity have spawned a global movement with over 100 cycle chic blogs featuring similarly themed photography from other cities and areas around the world. So now many people are making their own blogs that feature cyclists around the world. Most of them are associated with the original blog, the Copenhagen Cycle Chic.

== Cyclist behaviour ==
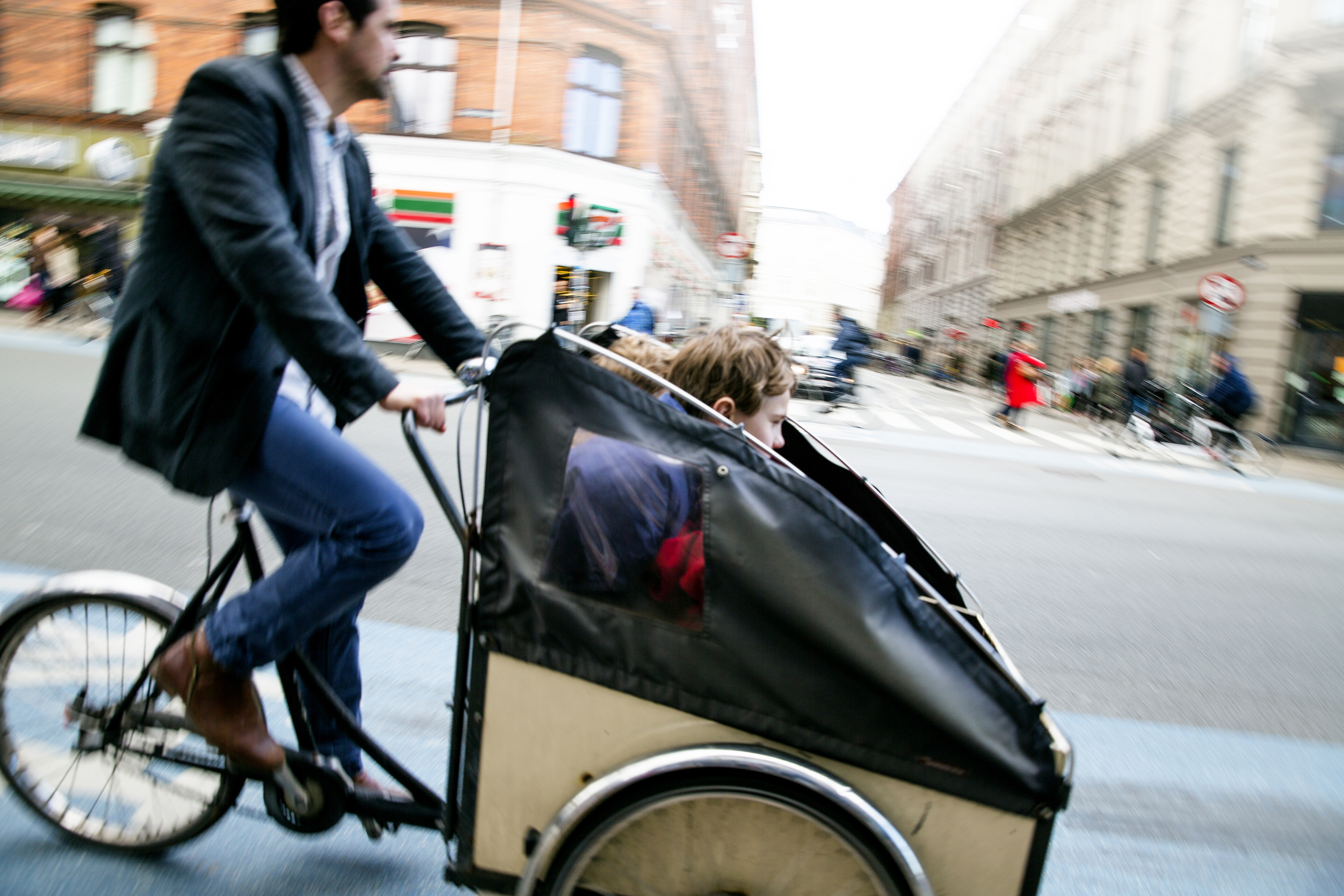
Cargo bike used to transport two kids

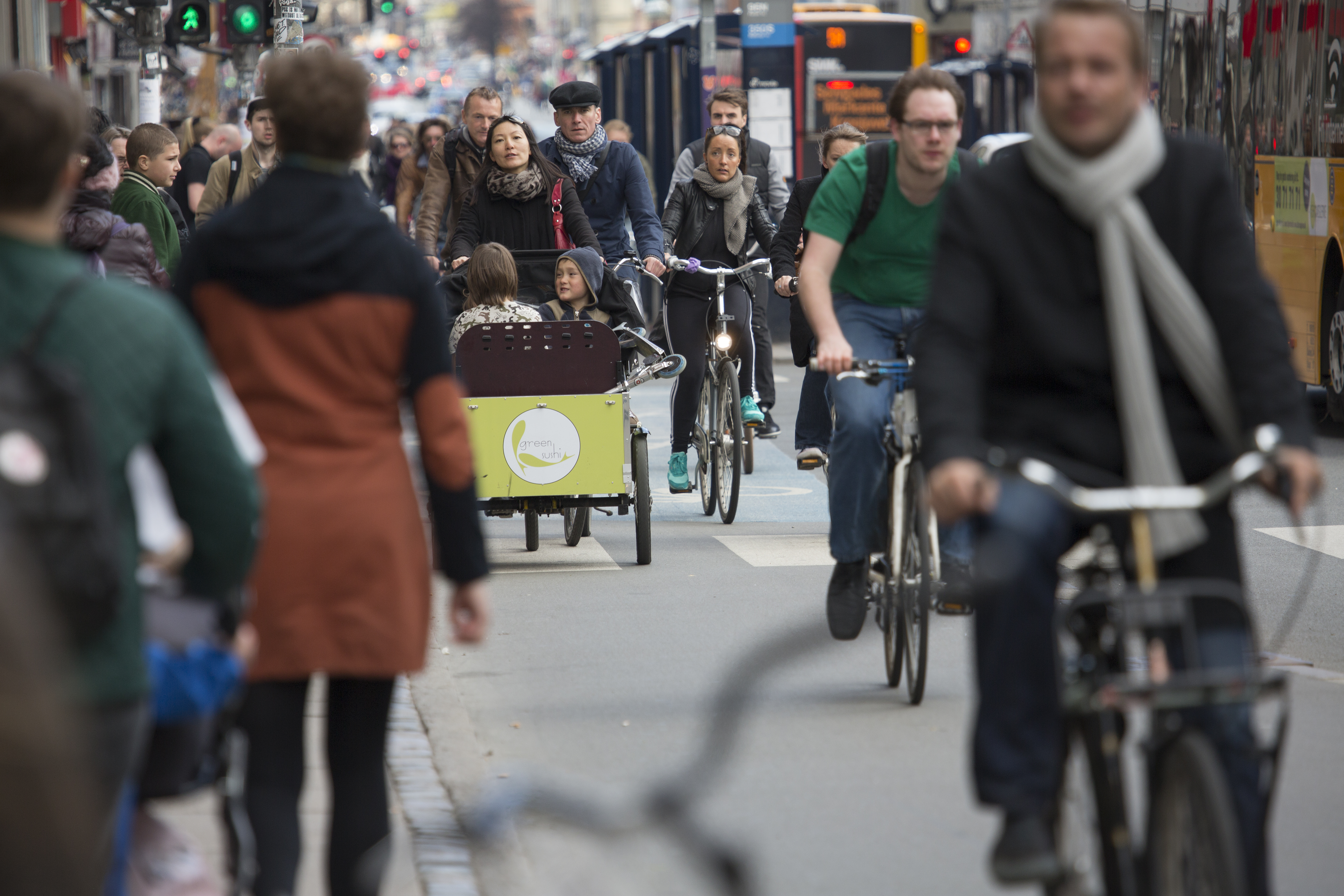
The issue of cyclist behaviour has been linked to the city's novel problem of bicycle congestion

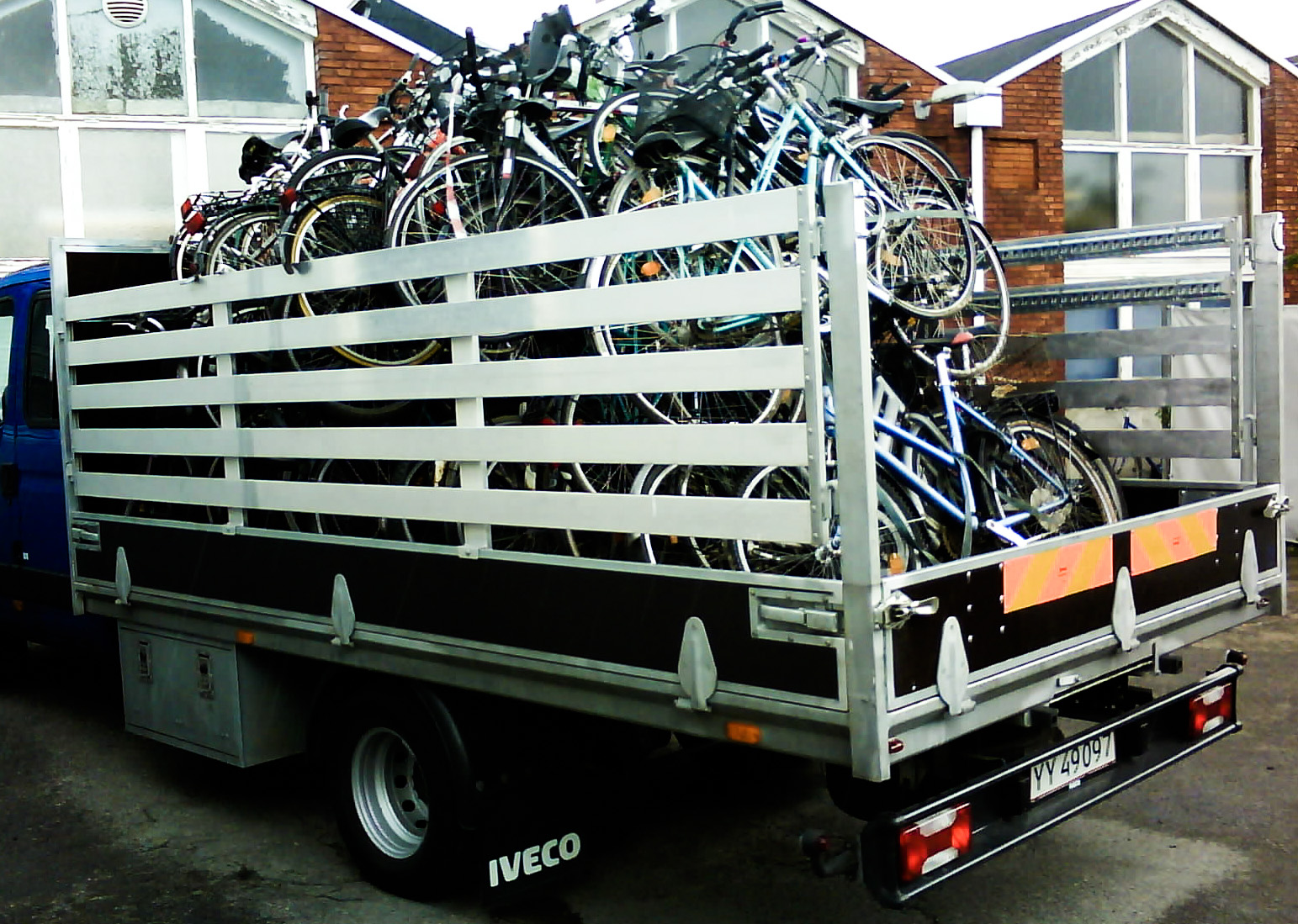
The large number of bicycles also causes some nuisance effects. This is one of several vehicles that pick up approximately 13,000 abandoned bicycles on public streets in Copenhagen each year.

A criticism directed towards the cycling culture of Copenhagen is that the city's singular focus on bicycles has nourished a culture of bad behaviour among the city's cyclists, Mr Mikael le Dous, chairman of the Dansk Fodgænger Forbund (Danish Pedestrian Association) went so far as to call cyclists the "plague of the pavement", while another member claimed that the "Cyclist has taken over everything". In an article series on the subject run by Danish tabloid Ekstra Bladet, the operative leader in the Copenhagen Police's traffic division called Copenhagen cyclists "egoistic" and called for a change in the cycle culture, and in another he named them the "cuckoos of traffic". According to a survey done by the municipality of Copenhagen in 2010, 55% of non-cycling Copenhageners found that more consideration towards others from cyclists would make the streets more safe, while the same number for automobiles was 27%. Among the cyclists themselves, 35% would like more consideration from other cyclists.

Contrary to this, however, a number of international observers have noted that in comparison to other countries, Copenhagen cyclists are very well behaved, and in a survey done by the Dutch Fietsberaad (Dutch National Bicycle Council) they noted that:

cyclists obey traffic regulations quite well. In Copenhagen people do not feel this way, as other road users complain in considerable and increasing numbers about cyclists' behaviour. But compared to cycling in the Netherlands, everything is extremely tidy and disciplined. Over 90% of cyclists stop at a red light. Riding three abreast, with passengers on the back, [and using] mobile phone[s] [are] rare occurrences

Some observers such as British daily The Guardian and CNNs Richard Quest, as well as the city administration itself, has linked the issue of cyclist behaviour to the city's novel problem of bike congestion; there are simply too many bicycles, relative to the infrastructure provided. During the morning and afternoon rush hour, it is not uncommon that there are too many cyclists for all to cross during green light cycles at intersections along the busy corridors. Another rush hour issue is lack of space on busy sections of the bicycle path network, with cyclists moving at different speeds without much leeway, creating an intimidating atmosphere for kids, the elderly and inexperienced cyclists. This in turn has created a conflict of space allocation, where cycling advocates claim that too little is done to accommodate the majority of cyclists and pedestrians since only 29.1% of the city's population own a car, while some motorists, including the Danish motoring association, feels that the capital hate cars, and that the city's accommodation of bicycles have already gone too far.

== See also ==
- Outline of cycling
- Modal share
