= Cycling Embassy of Denmark =

Danish network organization

The Cycling Embassy of Denmark (CED) is a Danish network organization dedicated to the promotion of cycling as a means of transportation and Denmark as a cycling nation by capitalizing on the deep rooted Danish cycling culture to offer solutions to urban planners across Europe and the world in the areas of urban planning, bicycle infrastructure development, and cycling promotion.

== History ==
The CED was founded on 12 May 2009 during the 2009 Velo-city conference in Brussels. The Danish ambassador to Belgium, Jørgen Molde, conducted an inauguration ceremony that attracted the attention of the Danish and international press as well as politicians and urban planners in attendance at Velo-city.

== Network ==
The CED comprises a network of Danish cities, companies and associations, including:

- The municipality of Copenhagen
- The municipality of Frederiksberg
- The municipality of Odense
- The municipality of Aalborg
- The municipality of Aarhus
- The municipality of Middelfart
- The municipality of Randers
- Aros Kommunikation
- Danish Cyclists' Federation
- Reelight
- Velorbis
- Veksø A/S
- COWI A/S
- Gehl Architects
- Danish Cancer Society
- DSB (railway company)
- Atkins Danmark
- Rambøll
- Gottlieb Paludan Architects

== Leadership Award for Cycling Promotion ==
During the 2009 United Nations Climate Change Conference, the CED awarded New York City mayor Mike Bloomberg the first ever Leadership Award for Cycling Promotion.

In 2010, Roelof Wittink was awarded with the Leadership Award for Cycling Promotion during the Velo-city Global conference in Copenhagen.

== See also ==
- Cycling in Denmark
- Danish Cyclists Federation
- Cycling in Copenhagen
