= Cycling in Denmark =

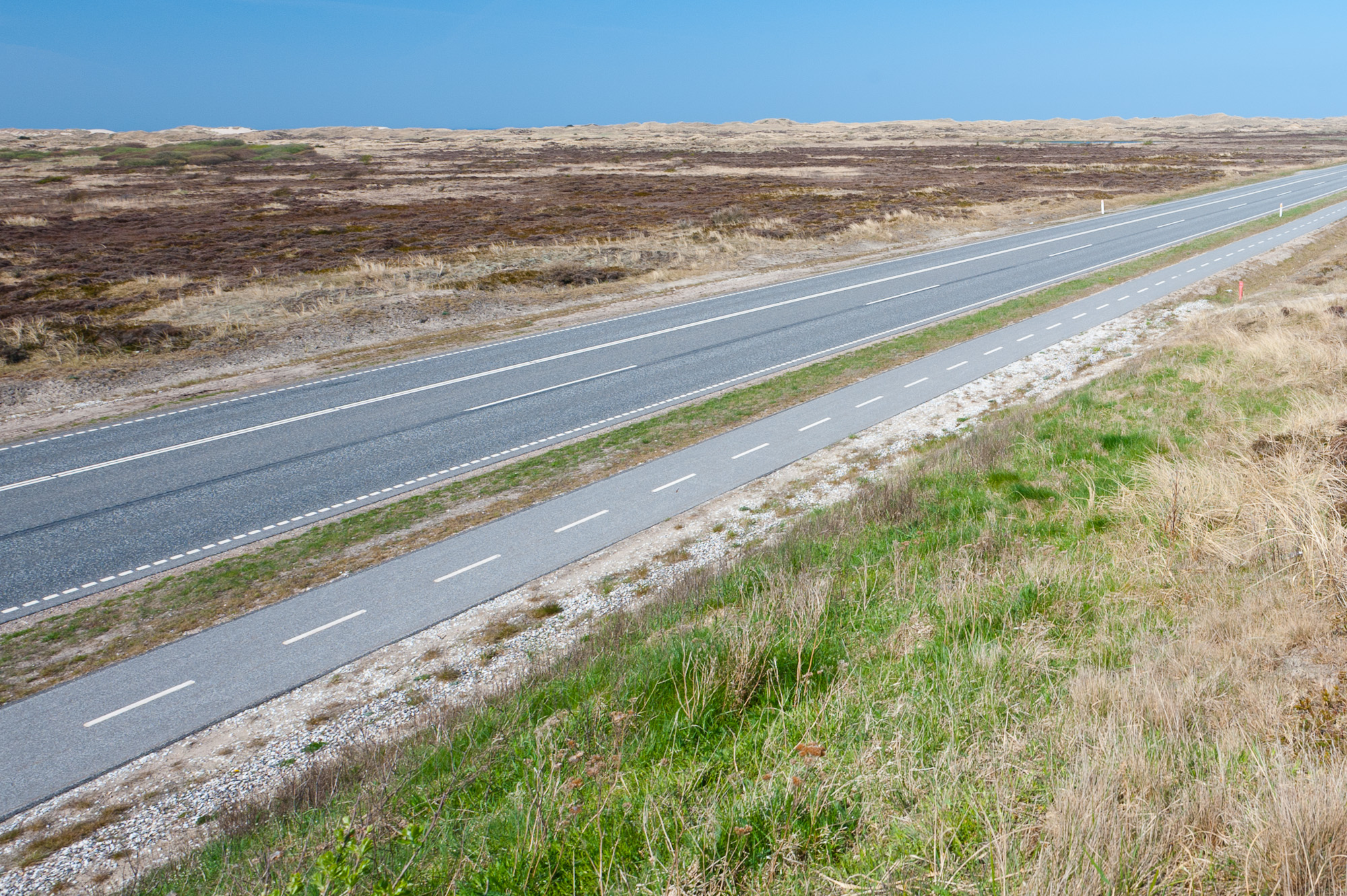
The bicycle path between Skagen and Frederikshavn is very popular with tourists. Here it runs parallel with (but clearly separated from) the road - at other places it goes through forest and dune areas.

Cycling in Denmark is both a common and popular recreational and utilitarian activity. Bicycling infrastructure is a dominant feature of both city and countryside infrastructure with segregated dedicated bicycle paths and lanes in many places and the network of 11 Danish National Cycle Routes (along with many regional routes) extends more than 12,000 kilometres (7,500 mi) nationwide. Often bicycling and bicycle culture in Denmark is compared to the Netherlands as a bicycle-nation.

== Infrastructure ==
=== Cycle paths and lanes ===
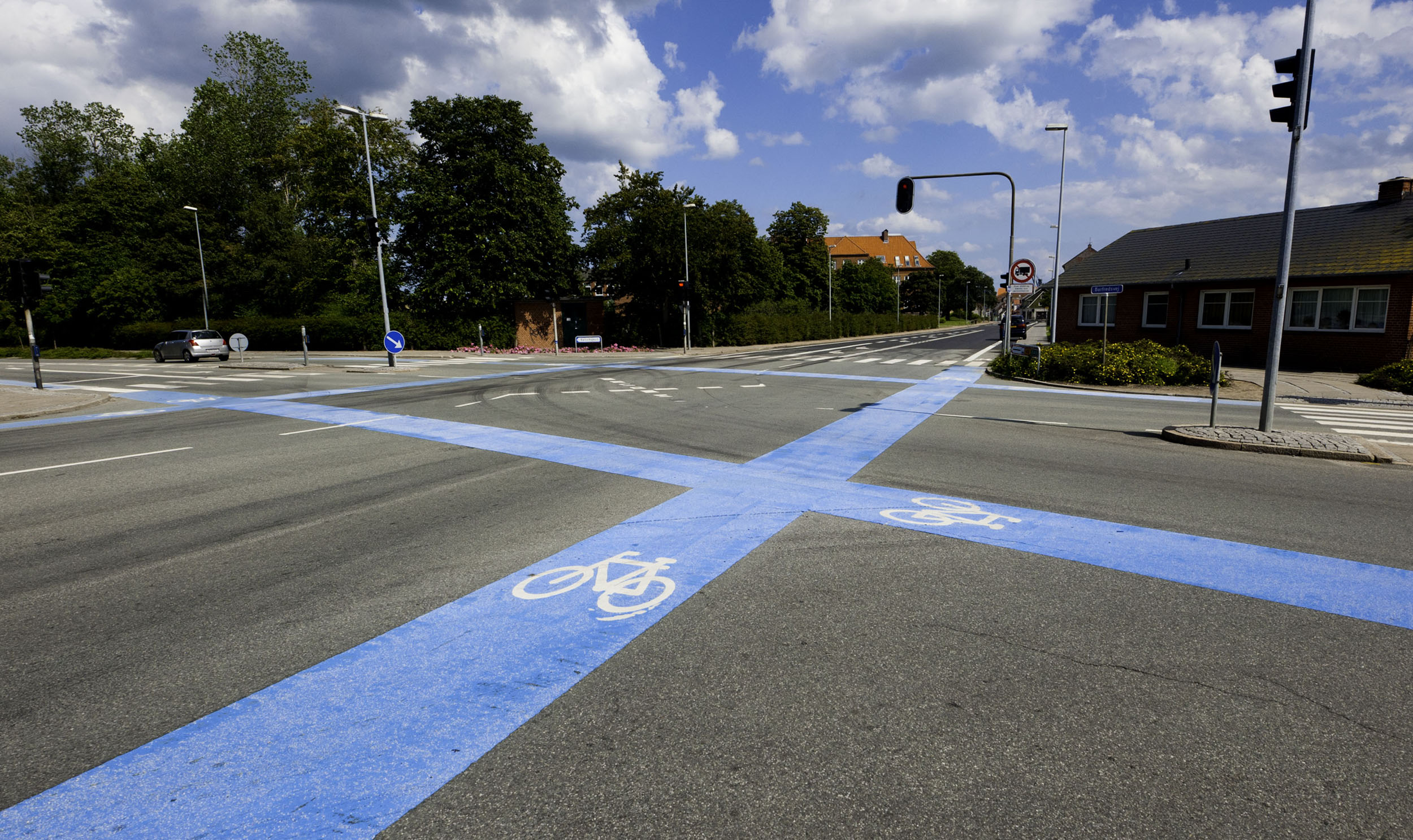
Blue markings for cycles at an intersection

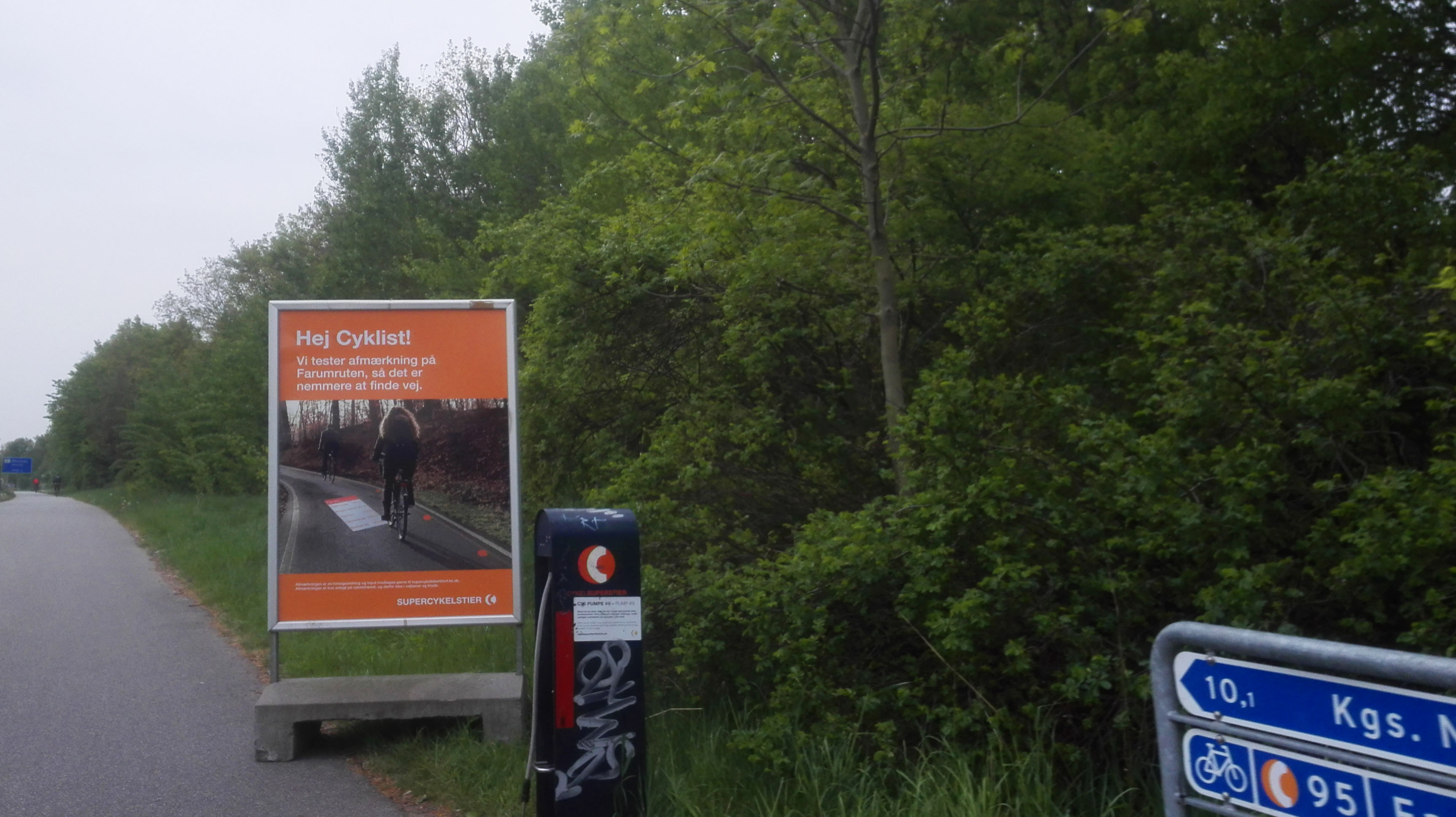
A public bicycle pump and direction signs for bicycles along a 'bicycle highway' in Copenhagen.

There are an estimated 7,000 kilometres (4,300 mi) of segregated dedicated bicycle paths and lanes in Denmark and the four biggest cities alone account for more than 1,350 kilometres (840 mi) with 609 kilometres (378 mi) in Aalborg, 510 kilometres (320 mi) in Odense, 450 kilometres (280 mi) in Aarhus and 412 kilometres (256 mi) in Copenhagen.

Cycle paths are often raised above the shoulder of the road and separated by a curb, but on older roads it is more common to have a cycle lane separated by a thick white line and sometimes the lane may be marked by coloured asphalt. Massive infrastructure investments are taking place to create more cycle ways and thus increase safety. At intersections, the continuation of the cycle way or lane is often highlighted by a broad blue band to increase its visibility and cyclists may find that they have their own set of traffic lights. In general both paths and lanes are designed for the more slow pace of utility cycling as opposed to more speedy designs in other countries. The Danish Roads Directorate acknowledges that the Danish cycle track system "functions best when cyclists travel at relatively low speeds".

In Copenhagen a system of interconnected green cycle routes, "greenways", is under development, with the aim of facilitating fast, safe and pleasant cycle transport across the city. The network will cover more than 100 kilometres (62 mi) and consist of 22 routes. As of 2011, there were 40 kilometres (25 mi) of greenways in Copenhagen.

=== Danish National Cycle Routes ===
The 11 Danish National Cycle Routes form a network of cycling routes throughout the country. They are important routes enabling bicycle tourism and showing off Denmark's natural beauty as well as its regional towns and villages.

=== Integration with other means of transportation ===
Cycling is integrated into both the national, the regional and the local train services in Denmark. Cycles are permitted on trains to facilitate mixed-mode commuting. This is most visible in the urban and suburban rail network of Metropolitan Copenhagen, the S-trains, where cycles can be transported in specified carriages found at the front and rear of each train. As of 2011 there is no charge for taking cycles on any S-train. A number of Movia bus lines in Region Zealand allow the carriage of cycles for an extra charge (no charge on Copenhagen Harbour Buses) unless the bus driver deems the bus too crowded.

=== Cycle parking ===
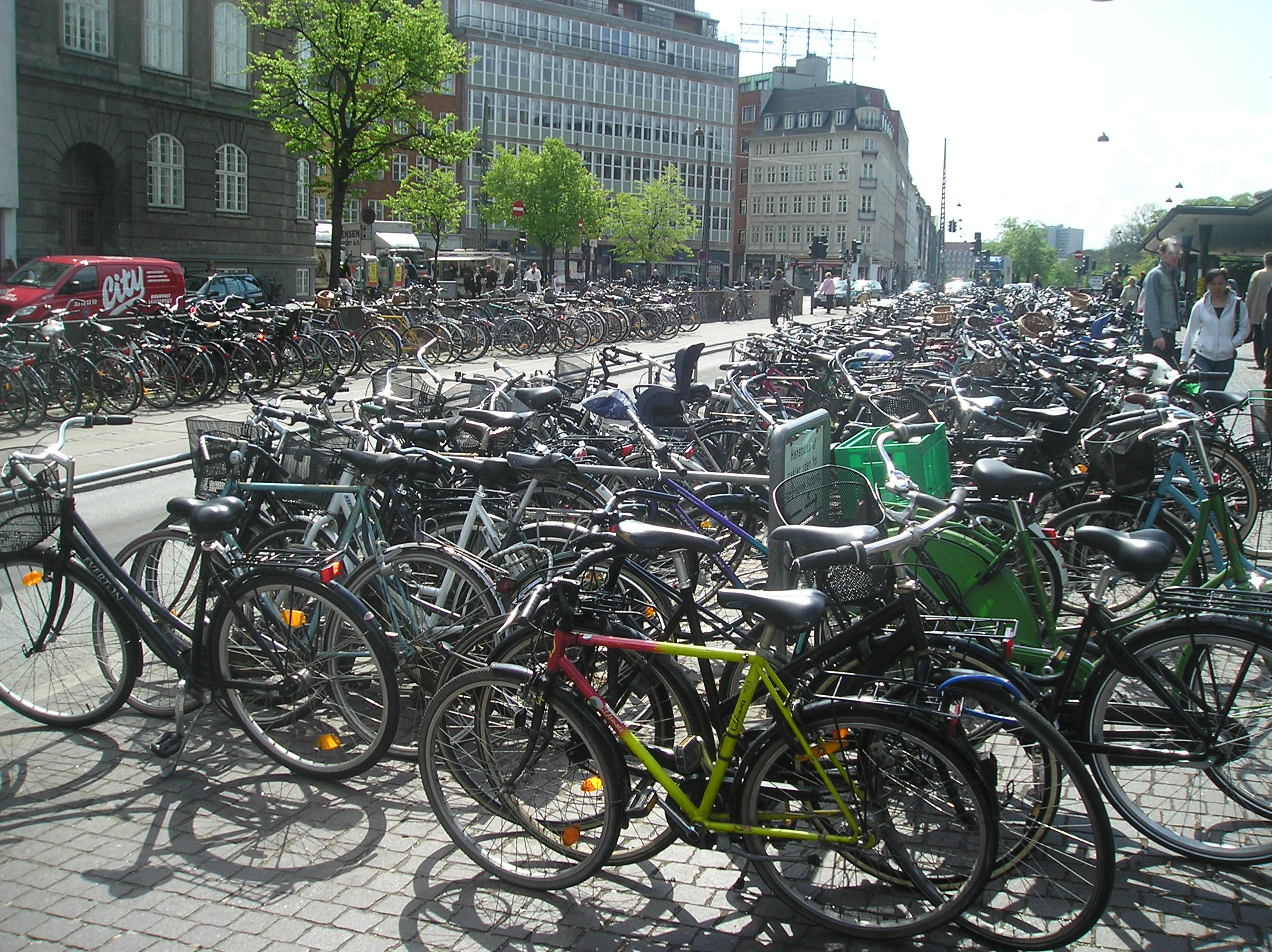
Available parking facilities are often inadequate in the major cities. Nørreport Station in Copenhagen.

Although there appear to be a large number of cycle parking facilities in Denmark, there is actually a severe lack of available cycle stands. Those that do exist are often poorly positioned, particularly in the bigger cities. In 2008, with a view to remedying the situation, the Danish Cyclists Federation published a Bicycle Parking Manual with a number of guidelines. They aim to be of immediate practical use to users but also offer advice for city planners wishing to improve facilities in the future.

== Utility cycling ==
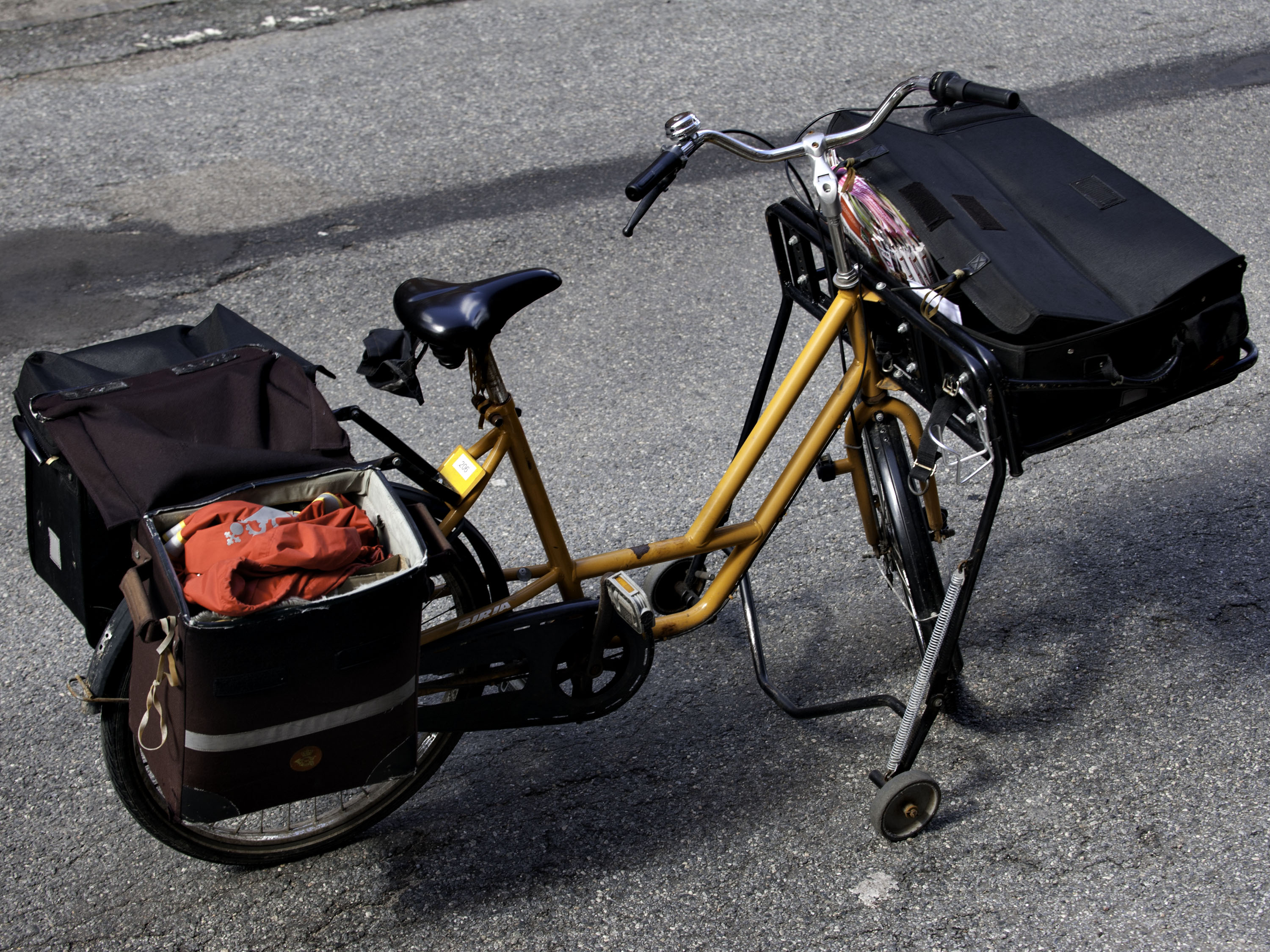
Postal bike used in a city by Post Danmark

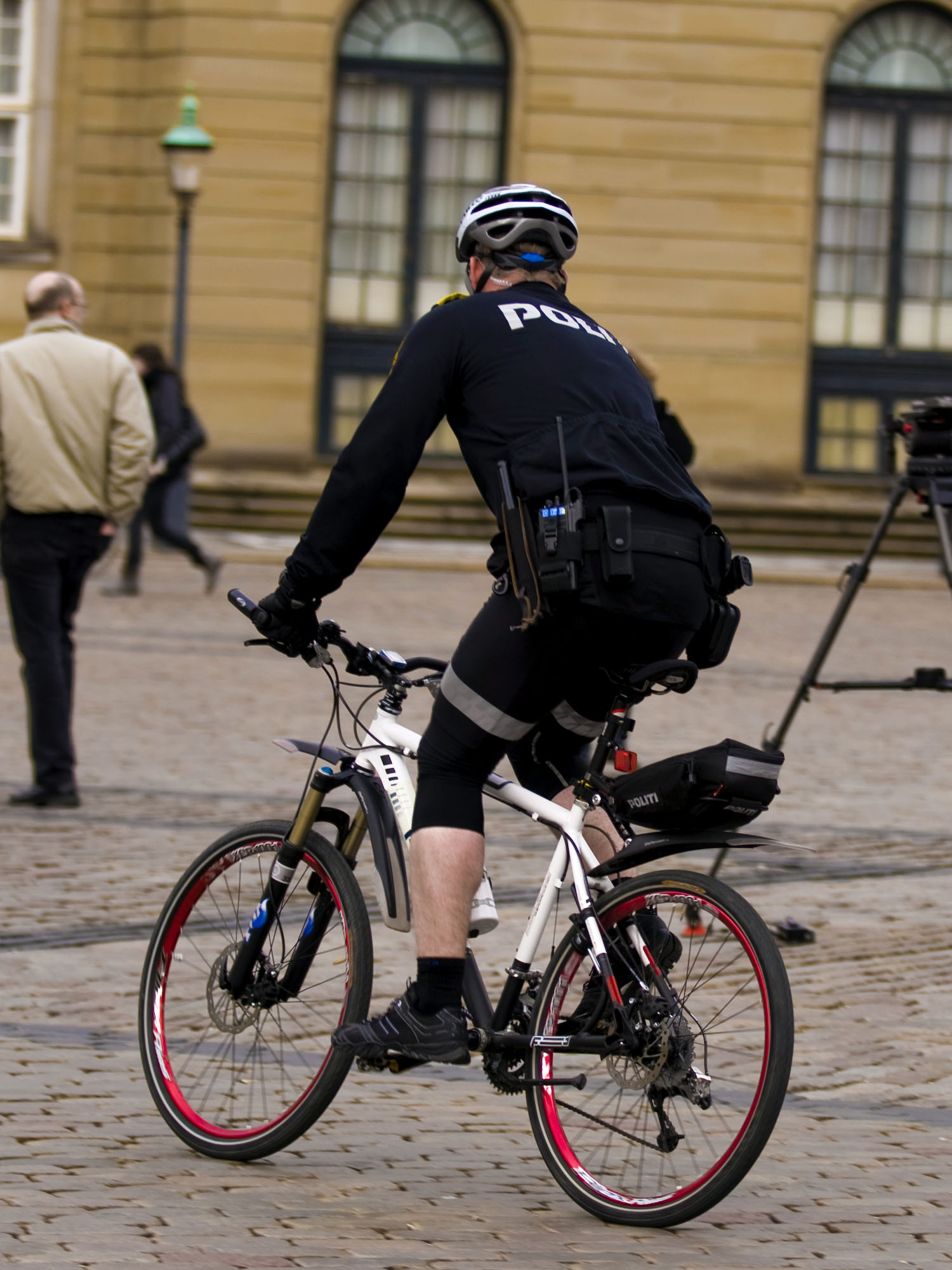
Danish police officer on a bicycle

Most children start bicycling to school from age 8-10 and continue to do so until at least 18 (the minimum age for acquiring a drivers license in Denmark), but in the bigger cities some people will rely on the cycle as the primary transportation throughout life. Most Danish public schools also educate 10–12 years in traffic rules, behaviour and regulations as a part of their regular curriculum. Utility bicycles which require little maintenance and are suited to load carrying are very popular. However, all other types of cycles are accommodated on the bicycle paths/ways, from racing bicycles with tri-bars through streamlined velomobiles. Two- and three-wheeled cargo bicycles are also becoming increasingly popular, with the trend starting in Copenhagen and spreading out through the country.

The common use of cycles and the growing support infrastructure for utility cycling, has encouraged Denmark to brand itself as a leading nation in everyday cycling. It has also led to the reinvention of the term Copenhagenization as a concept in urban planning and design relating to the implementation of better pedestrian facilities and cycling infrastructure for utility cycling in cities, and been an inspiration for an increasing number of cycle chic blogs spawning from Copenhagen Cycle Chic.

Danish postal workers have been using cycles for transport in towns and cities to deliver mail for several generations. Likewise small shop delivery services used cycles until the mid-1960s. As a result of a move to supermarket shopping, delivery by bicycles declined, though the growth of messenger services sparked a new life for delivery by bike in the mid 80's.

Since the mid-2000s cycle rickshaws (velotaxis) have operated in the bigger cities and offer short distance journeys (usually up to 3 kilometres (1.9 mi)) - primarily during summer. Around the same period small enterprises started selling coffee or soup from mobile tricycle stalls around city centres.

Since 1 March 2009 the police in Copenhagen have been patrolling on cycles. Besides being a quick and efficient means of transportation, it has been found to increase visibility and to improve contact with citizens.

== Danish cycle VIN-system ==
The Danish cycle VIN-system is a system introduced in 1942 by the Danish government, providing all cycles in Denmark with a unique code. The code is a combination of letters and digits embedded into the bicycle frame and made up of a manufacturer-code, a serial-number and construction year. By law it has been illegal since 1948 to sell cycle frames in Denmark without an embedded VIN and, as a result, insurance companies in Denmark do not pay indemnities for stolen cycles without a VIN.

== Regular cycle events in Denmark ==
- Danmark Rundt, a national Danish stage race since 1985, usually held in late July or early August
- A yearly 6 day track race, usually held in Ballerup in late January or early February since 1934
- Rundetårn Unicycle Race, every year in spring, a unicycle race is held in the tower's 7.5-turn helical corridor. The contestants have to go up and down the Rundetårn. The world record, set in 1988, is 1 minute and 48.7 seconds.

== Tourists ==
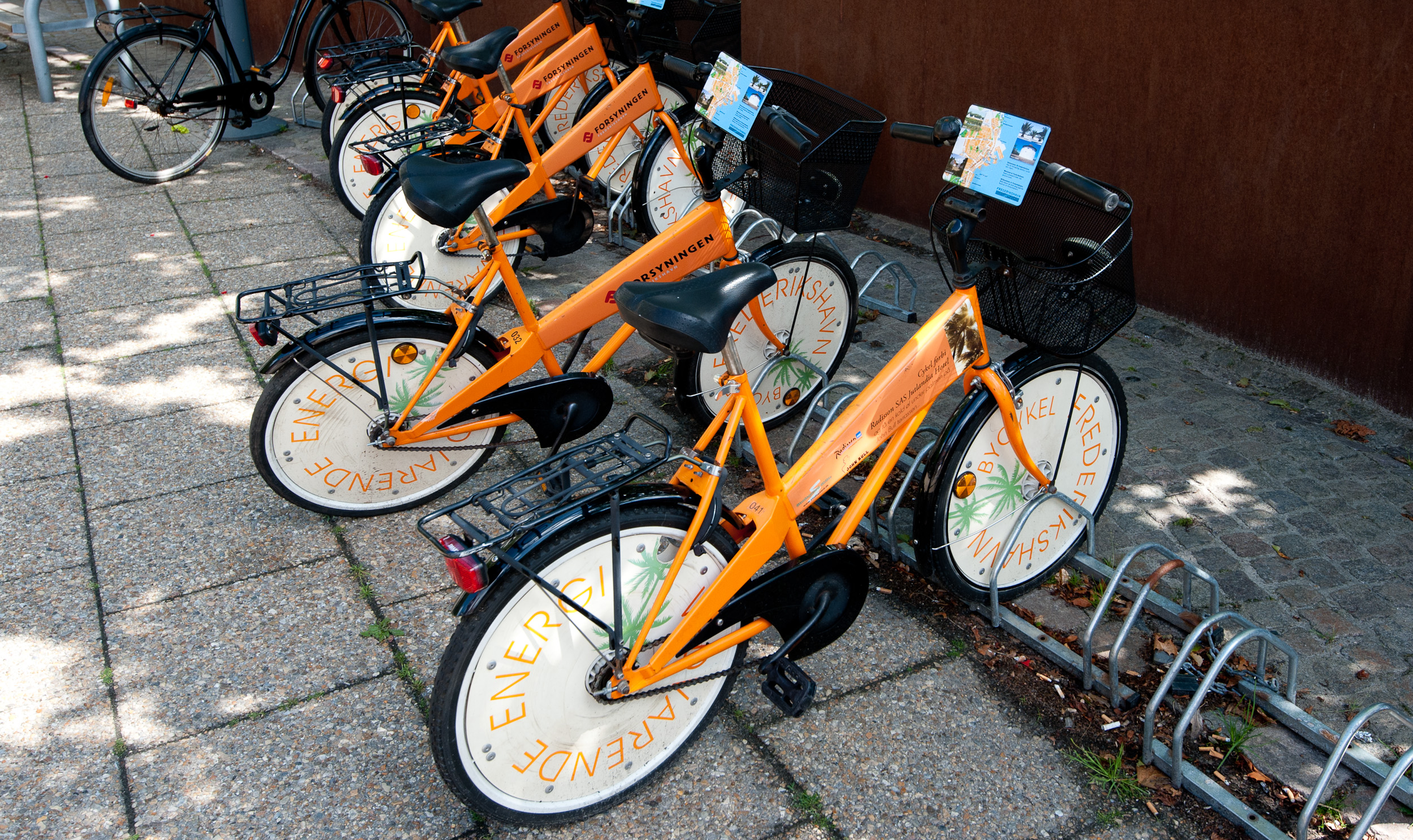
Shared bicycle system in Frederikshavn

It is quite common in Denmark to rent a cycle for riding around the countryside or the city. Most cities have a form of a bicycle sharing system. The method and pricing varies from location to location: the Copenhagen City Bikes in Copenhagen, for example, required a deposit of DKK 20 and restricted the use of the cycle to a defined area in the city centre, whereas other companies require documentation and a higher deposit. Bycykel in Aalborg is similar to the system that was in Copenhagen, for DKK 20 you can drive around in the city. Cycle rental shops are quite common and many different types of cycles are available. In Denmark, like the Netherlands, bicycle helmets were rarely worn by adults. A parliamentary proposal in 2009 to introduce a mandatory helmet law for children in Denmark was defeated.

However, in recent years bicycle helmet use in Denmark has significantly increased without the implementation of helmet legislation. An observational study monitoring helmet use since 2004 shows that from 2004 to 2022, helmet use among all cyclists rose from 6% to 50%, and among school children from 33% to 79%. This increase is likely due to non-legislative means and social processes such as traffic safety education and behavior change campaigns.

== Cars and cycles ==
In general cycles and cars coexist quite well in Denmark and, unlike the Netherlands, Denmark does not have strict liability for car-drivers, but instead has a system that partially resembles it. There are two forms of liability that comes into action: liability in regards to the Danish traffic law (Danish: Færdselsloven) and liability in damages in regards to the insurance companies. In an accident where a car going the right way in a one-way street and hits a cyclist going the wrong way, there will be a liability for both the car's owner (who will not necessarily be the driver) and the cyclist. This is due to a requirement for liability insurance (Danish: ansvarsforsikring) for vehicle owners; the insurance companies will always apply this and thus make the vehicle's owner liable for damages. However the cyclist may be deemed liable by the Danish legal system for violating the one-way restriction while the driver may escape charges. In that case the car owner's insurance company may seek reimbursement (Danish: regres) from the cyclist. However, in the majority of the accidents the car driver is found liable in both regards; in 1999, in 90% of the accidents involving cars and cyclists the car-drivers were found fully liable.

== Rules ==
As of 28 March 2014, cyclists in Denmark can receive a fine for cycling without lights after a certain time of day; using a hand-held mobile phone while cycling; having defective brakes, reflectors, etc.; cycling against a red light; cycling against the direction of traffic; cycling on a pedestrian crossing; cycling on the left side of a bicycle path; not respecting traffic signs or arrows; breaking the unconditional right of way; not signaling; cycling with no hands on the handlebars; cycling on the sidewalk or footpath; holding onto another vehicle; cycling with two people on a bicycle that only has one seat (both persons will receive a fine); or positioning oneself in the wrong place before or while making a turn. Cyclists can also receive a warning if their bell does not work. Even though there is no fixed blood alcohol level above which it is illegal to ride a bicycle, cyclists can receive a fine for cycling under the influence if the police assess that doing so would be irresponsible.

In intersections, cyclists wanting to turn left are not allowed to use the left-turn lanes that are meant for cars, but must cross the intersection first and turn left from there. If separate bike lanes are available, cyclists must use them. Bike lights must be lit after sunset until sunrise, or in case of bad visibility also during day time. Blinking lights are allowed with a minimum frequency of 120 flashes per minute (2 Hz). Blinking orange front-facing lights are not allowed (due to possible confusion with vehicle turn signals). All bikes sold since 1988 must have brakes on both front and back wheels.

== Ownership ==
It's estimated over 70% of Danes own a bicycle.

== See also ==
- Bicycle monarchy
- Danish National Cycle Routes
- Cycling in Copenhagen
- List of bicycle-sharing systems
- Outline of cycling
