= Cycle chic =

Cycling in fashionable everyday clothes

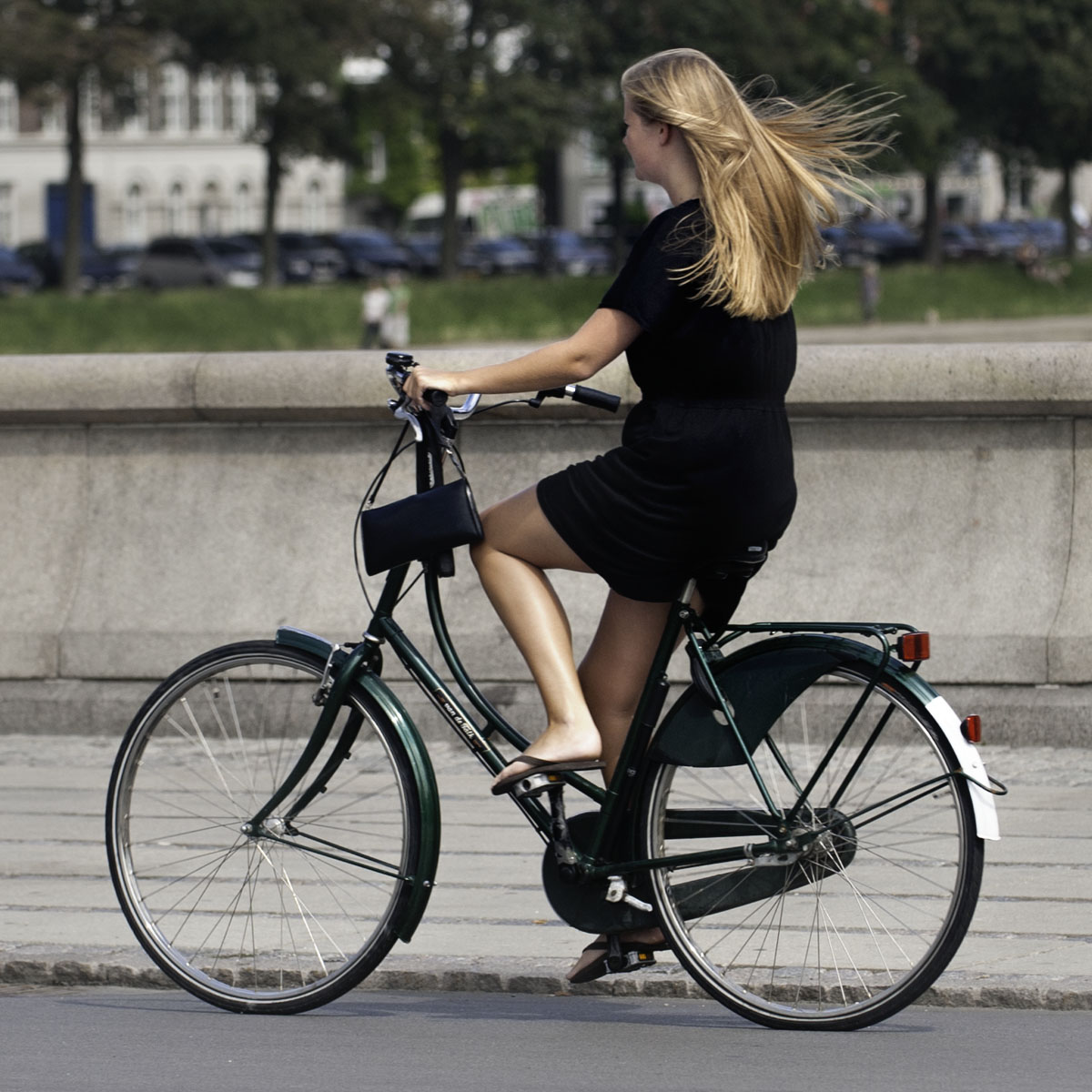
Cycle Chic in Denmark

Cycle chic or bicycle chic refers to cycling in fashionable everyday clothes. The fashion concept developed in popular culture to include bicycles and bicycle accessories as well as clothing. The phrase Cycle Chic was coined in 2007 by Mikael Colville-Andersen, who started the Copenhagen Cycle Chic blog in the same year.

== History ==
Cycle Chic is a modern phrase to describe something that has existed since the invention of the bicycle in the 1880s - regular citizens on bicycles. Cycling was fashionable from the late 1880s and through the 1940s.

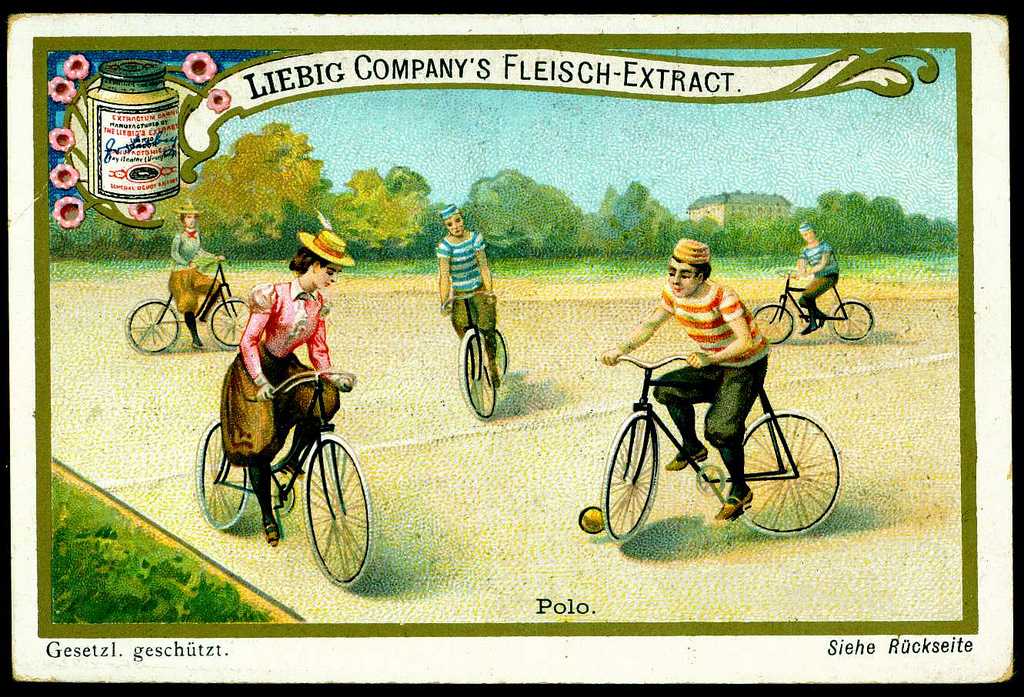
Cycle polo, early 20th century

At the end of the 19th century, the height of cycle chic was to play polo on bicycles, using long-handled tennis rackets and rubber balls. Women's wear (such as corsets and petticoats) was impractical for cycling and so rational dress was required. Divided skirts, bloomers and knickerbockers were tried as fashionable women attempted to resolve the matter without provoking hostility, ridicule or violence. More recently, in the 1980s bicycle messengers became a common sight on the streets of major cities, and the messengers' mix of street fashion and cycling gear was seen as an alternative fashion statement.

In 1995, Vibe magazine, owned by Quincy Jones, listed brands that had "infiltrated" cycling such as Dolce & Gabbana, DKNY and FILA with cycle chic. This clothing shares little with the contemporary perception of the phrase, however, as it was more focused the bicycle messenger crowd.

Around the time that Mikael Colville-Andersen coined the phrase Cycle Chic, the bicycle had largely disappeared from the public consciousness as a transport option, at least in many North American cities, though that was not the case in northern Europe. The first photo taken by Mikael Colville-Andersen in 2006, which led to the Copenhagen Cycle Chic blog and the global trend has been referred to as "The Photo That Launched a Million Bicycles". The current bicycle boom in transportation and fashion has its roots in this one photo. IBM's Smarter Planet have documented the birth and growth of the Cycle Chic trend using advanced analytic software - from its origins in Copenhagen through 2012.

Today cycle chic is associated with the American phrase utility cycling, people cycling to get around, not just for exercise or at sporting events. It is particularly associated with wearing everyday clothes with an emphasis on stylish dressing. Cycle chic is especially prominent in cities with many bicycle-commuters such as Amsterdam and Copenhagen but the number of Cycle Chic blogs around the world indicates that the interest is global in nature.

Official and unofficial blogs encourage cyclists to dress up, as a way of raising the profile of cycling and to encourage others to feel they can cycle without helmets and the specialist clothing associated with sports cycling. Articles in the media promote fashionable cycling by publishing photographs of celebrities such as Agyness Deyn riding bikes.

== Bicycles and accessories ==
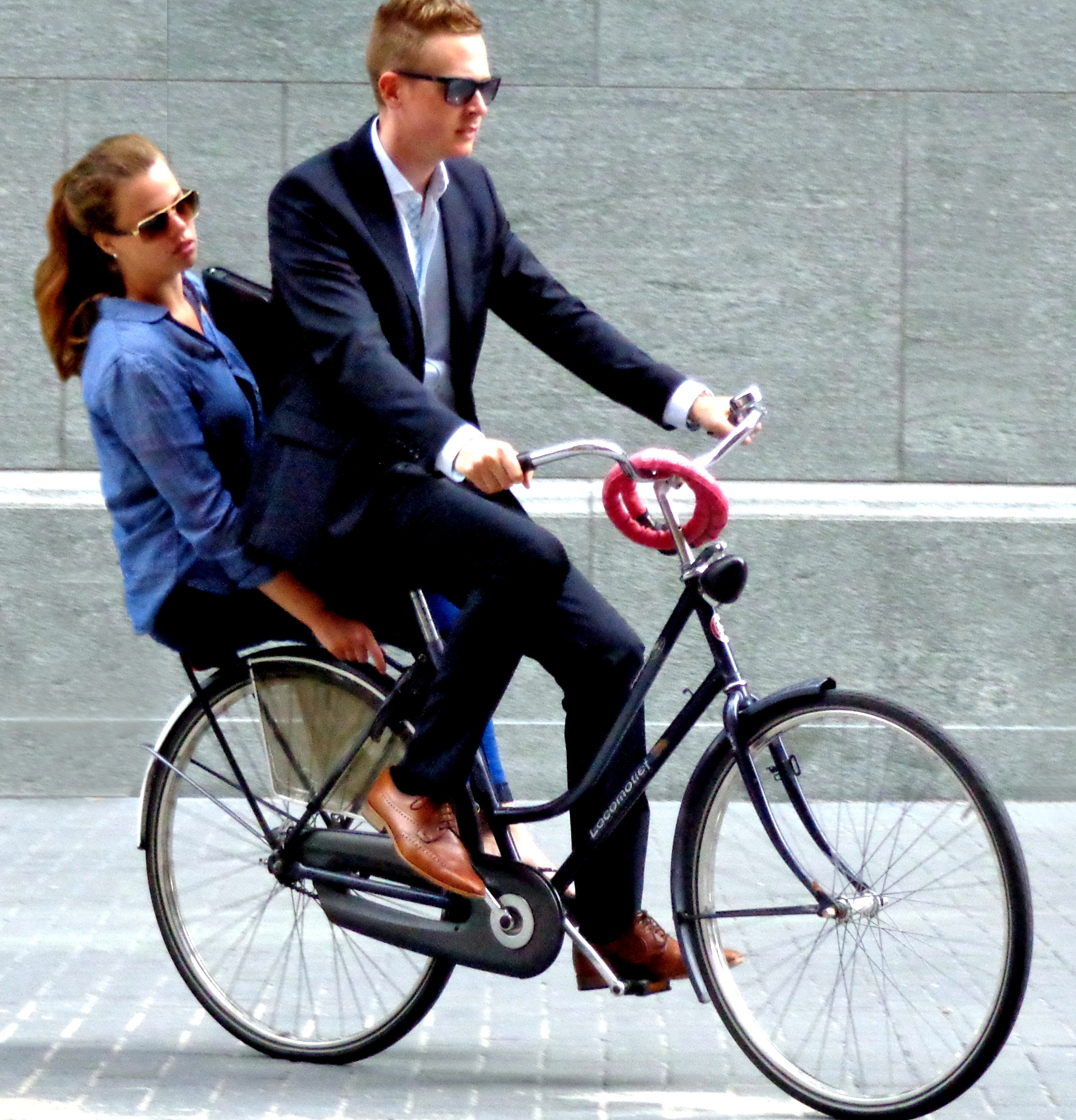
A Dutch couple in their normal, formal or fashionable clothes.

Vintage bicycles dating back to the 1950s and 60s are especially seen as appropriate, with their mudguards, chain guard, carriers, baskets and lights all contributing to their usefulness. The point is to be able to cycle casually without special protection, with shopping or pets, even with a passenger riding on the rack (although that is illegal in some countries). Models mentioned in various early 21st century media include vintage Schwinns, three-speed Raleighs, the Velorbis, and the new-vintage models made by Pashleys and Brooklyn Bicycle Co., all bicycles which incorporate classic vintage features. The Scandinavian type of cargo bike, capable of carrying large loads or several small children, is becoming more popular in other countries influenced by the trend.

Picking up on the cycle chic trend early on, various fashion houses like Chanel and Gucci designed their own bicycles.

Bicycle helmets are notably absent from the official Copenhagen Cycle Chic website, not because Danish people do not wear helmets (although most don't) but as a matter of policy associated with the Cycle Chic® trademark. The policy is promoted on the basis that the evidence does little to support the idea that helmets increase safety, and that they discourage people from cycling.

== Websites ==
The term cycle chic is associated with many related blogs picturing people, especially women, cycling in stylish everyday clothes. There are over 100 Cycle Chic blogs and most of them are associated with the community formed around the original blog, Copenhagen Cycle Chic, dubbed "the Sartorialist on two wheels" and selected as one of the ten best fashion blogs by The Guardian. The company Copenhagenize Design Co. in Copenhagen, holds the Copenhagen Cycle Chic and Copenhagenize.com blogs as well as the Cycle Chic territorial trademark in the United States and Brazil and encourages usage "for the idealistic purpose of non-commercial bicycle advocacy", as described in a manifesto A list of women's bike blogs worldwide includes links to many of the officially affiliated Cycle Chic blogs, as well as to others that also cover biking and fashion.

== See also ==
- City bicycle
- Utility cycling
- Tweed Run
- Bicycle culture
