= Copenhagen City Bikes =

Discontinued bike sharing system

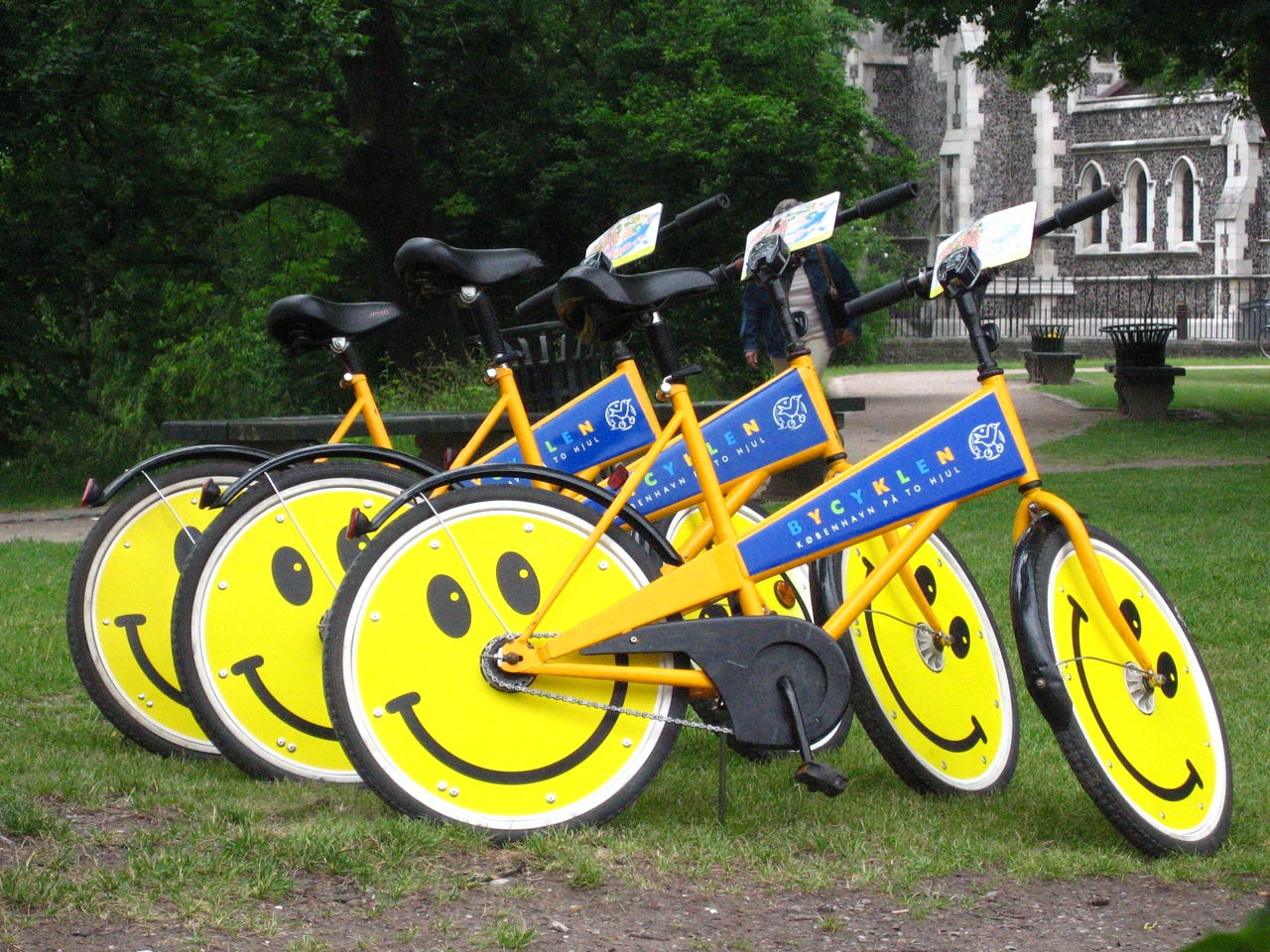
City Bike, Copenhagen

Copenhagen City Bikes or Bycykler København was the bicycle sharing system of Copenhagen, Denmark. Launched in 1995 with 1,000 cycles, the project was the world's first organized large-scale urban bike-sharing scheme, which, unlike its Dutch predecessor, featured what are now considered basic elements such as coin deposit, fixed stands and specially designed bikes with parts that cannot be used on other bikes. Riders paid a refundable deposit at one of 110 special bike stands and had unlimited use of a bike within the specified downtown area. The scheme was funded by commercial sponsors. In return, the bikes carried advertisements, which appeared on the bike frame and the solid-disk type wheels. When the programme was abolished in October 2012, some 1,500–1,700 bikes were still in service, out of a total of 2,500 put onto the streets.

== History ==
Following the first-generation bike sharing scheme from Amsterdam in the 60s, the first second-generation bike sharing system was introduced in 1991 in Farsø. Even though it was a small-scale scheme, it paved the way for the Copenhagen city bike scheme, where the original idea behind the scheme was to reduce the theft of bicycles in the city by offering specially designed units for free public use based on commercial sponsoring and advertising. It was initiated by entrepreneurs Ole Wessung and Morten Sadolin who believed that insurance companies would be willing to sponsor the programme as they would benefit financially from the reduction in stolen bicycles which were running at 27,000 a year in the city at the time.

Initial trials were, however, unsuccessful, and it was not until the scheme was backed by a foundation supported by the Municipality of Copenhagen, together with various government ministries and some private interests, that it became viable. Indeed, once the foundation had raised 2 million Danish kroner, the scheme finally got off the ground in May 1995. By 1996, with 10 additional sponsors including the Coca Cola Company, 1,500 cycles were made available throughout the city. By 2003, as a result of additional sponsors, the foundation was able to increase the number of city bikes to 2,500.

The scheme served as an example for many other cities worldwide to adopt similar approaches.

In the final years the city bikes were available from 110 cycle stands distributed throughout the downtown area. The cycles could be used in daylight hours during the summer months (mid-April to November) by using a 20 DKK coin to retrieve them from the cycle stands. The coin was refunded when you returned the bike.

Copenhagen had an extensive and well-designed system of cycle paths, earning it a reputation as one of the most bicycle-friendly cities in the world. In recognition of Copenhagen's emphasis on bicycling, the city was chosen by the Union Cycliste Internationale as their first official Bike City. Bike City Copenhagen covered the period 2008 to 2011 and consisted of big cycling events for professionals as well as amateurs.

== Abolition and new program ==
Though a tender was held in 2012 for a new version, which was expected to be introduced in 2013, the Copenhagen City Hall decided to abandon the plans for the new city bikes, due to a budget limit on the construction costs. The contract for the existing system would be terminated following the 2012 season, extended to the end of the year, and with no replacement available, the city bikes came to an end, though a commuter version is still expected to be introduced at some point.

The decision to abolish the city bikes was criticised by the Danish Cyclists Federation, the Federation of Danish Motorists and the tourist organisation Wonderful Copenhagen, which all considered the reason for the decision to be lack of interest from the City Hall. The programme managers expected that of the 1,500–1,700 bikes on the street, when the abolition was announced, much fewer would actually be available at the end of 2012.

After more than a year of being the only major Danish city without a city bike scheme, Copenhagen launched its new City Bikes in October 2014. The new, white city bikes feature GPS navigation and a motor and can be rented at an hourly rate or through a flat rate. As of December 2022 they are no longer operating.

== See also ==
- Cycling in Copenhagen
- Utility cycling
- Segregated cycle facilities
- Modal share
- Goboat
