= Brooklyn Bicycle Co. =

American bicycle company

- Type: Private
- Industry: Bicycles
- Founded: 2011; 15 years ago
- Headquarters: Brooklyn, New York, U.S.
- Area served: United States; Canada; Europe; Australia
- Key people: Ryan Zagata (founder, president)
- Products: Bicycles & bicycle accessories
- Website: brooklynbicycleco.com

Brooklyn Bicycle Co. (legally Brooklyn Cruiser LLC) is an American bicycle company headquartered in Williamsburg, Brooklyn, New York City. The company was founded by Ryan Zagata in 2011.

== Background and founding ==
Zagata, who had previously worked in the software industry, was inspired to design the bicycles after his move to Brooklyn and subsequent infatuation with the borough left him wanting to explore more of the neighborhood. The final push to start the company occurred during a trip to Vietnam where he saw utility bicycles being used to transport vast amounts of goods. His first design, the Brooklyn Cruiser, was offered for sale in August 2011, and was deliberately designed to function as a city bicycle for urban everyday use, unlike the off-road mountain bike or the road bicycle. In 2012, CNN named the Brooklyn Cruiser one of "the coolest commutes on two wheels". The company proved very successful, with one million dollar plus revenue projected for 2013. In 2013, two new models were launched titled Franklin and Bedford. Brooklyn Bicycle Co. moved into more versatile models in 2016 with the release of its Lorimer women's hybrid bike and Roebling men's hybrid bike. As of 2025, the company sold bikes in eight different collections.

== Design and reception ==
The bicycles have been showcased as fashionable options in publications such as Vogue where in 2012, a "Willow blue" bike was presented as an ideal match for a Thakoon Panichgul dress. In 2013 a limited edition red Brooklyn Cruiser was selected by the Museum of Modern Art for sale through its shop. The 2013 model, designed in collaboration with Grant Petersen (of Rivendell Bicycle Works) was influenced by Raleigh's 1950s bicycles. In 2016, Bicycle Magazine named the Wythe one of the year's Best City Bikes, and in that same year The Coolist listed the Wythe as one of the Best Commuter Bikes.

The company's name is only a reference to its Brooklyn, NY headquarters and design studio; its bikes are manufactured in Taiwan.

== Partnerships ==
In 2019, New Belgium Brewing commissioned Brooklyn Bicycle Co. to design and produce custom cruiser bicycles for its annual employee cycling program. The brewery had previously commissioned similar bicycles from other manufacturer, including Schwinn, Felt, Electra, and Detroit Bikes.

In 2022, Brooklyn Bicycle Co. entered into a distribution agreement in Australian with The Bike Collective, which supplies the brand to independent dealers.Later that year, the company established European distribution through Ikandomore ApS of Denmark; the arrangement was presented at Eurobike 2022, with initial shipments planned for 2023.

== Trade commentary ==
Zagata has been a recurring commentator in news media on the effect of tariffs on the U.S. bicycle industry. Following the introduction of Section 301 tariffs on Chinese goods in 2018, Inc. profiled Brooklyn Bicycle Co. as a case study in how small manufacturers were responding. In 2019, NPR featured Zagata in a segment on how import duties were affecting small bicycle companies, and he appeared on CNN to discuss the issue. The Sydney Morning Herald cited the company as a U.S. example of the commercial effects of the trade war between the United States and China.

Zagata was again cited on tariff issues in 2024, with appearances on NBC News, CNN, and Good Morning America.

== COVID-19 pandemic ==
During the COVID-19 pandemic, bicycle sales in the United States increased significantly, leading to widespread shortages. Brooklyn Bicycle Co. was mentioned in coverage by The New York Times and Time Out. and Bicycle Retailer and Industry News reported on founder Ryan Zagata’s experience managing supply disruptions.

== See also ==
- Cycle chic
- Urban cycling
