= Velorbis =

Danish bicycle manufacturer

Velorbis is a Danish bicycle manufacturer. Velorbis bicycles are designed in Denmark and manufactured in Germany. The company places an emphasis on using 'top of the range' components.

== Model characteristics ==
Velorbis bicycles typically have weather-resistant drum brakes and hub gears, as well as powder-coated frames. This is so that they can be used throughout the year, including during Scandinavian winters.

Other typical features include an upright riding position and wide tyres for rider comfort.

== Patronage ==
Velorbis bicycles are used by members of the Danish royal family and Danish Parliament.
