= Danish Cyclists' Federation =

Danish Cyclists' Federation (da: Cyklistforbundet) is a Danish non-governmental bicycle interest organisation, with the purpose of promoting bicycling and bicycle safety. It was founded in 1905 and got around 16,000 members (2013) Danish Cyclists' Federation is a member organisation of the European Cyclists' Federation and through that the World Cycling Alliance, and of the Cycling Embassy of Denmark.

With a view to remedying the situation of bicycle parking in Copenhagen and other Danish cities, in 2008 the Danish Cyclists' Federation published a "Bicycling Parking Manual" with a number of guidelines, that is now published in English by the Cycling Embassy of Danmark.

== See also ==
- Federation of Danish Motorists
- Outline of cycling
