= Cycling in the United States =

American sport and mode of transport

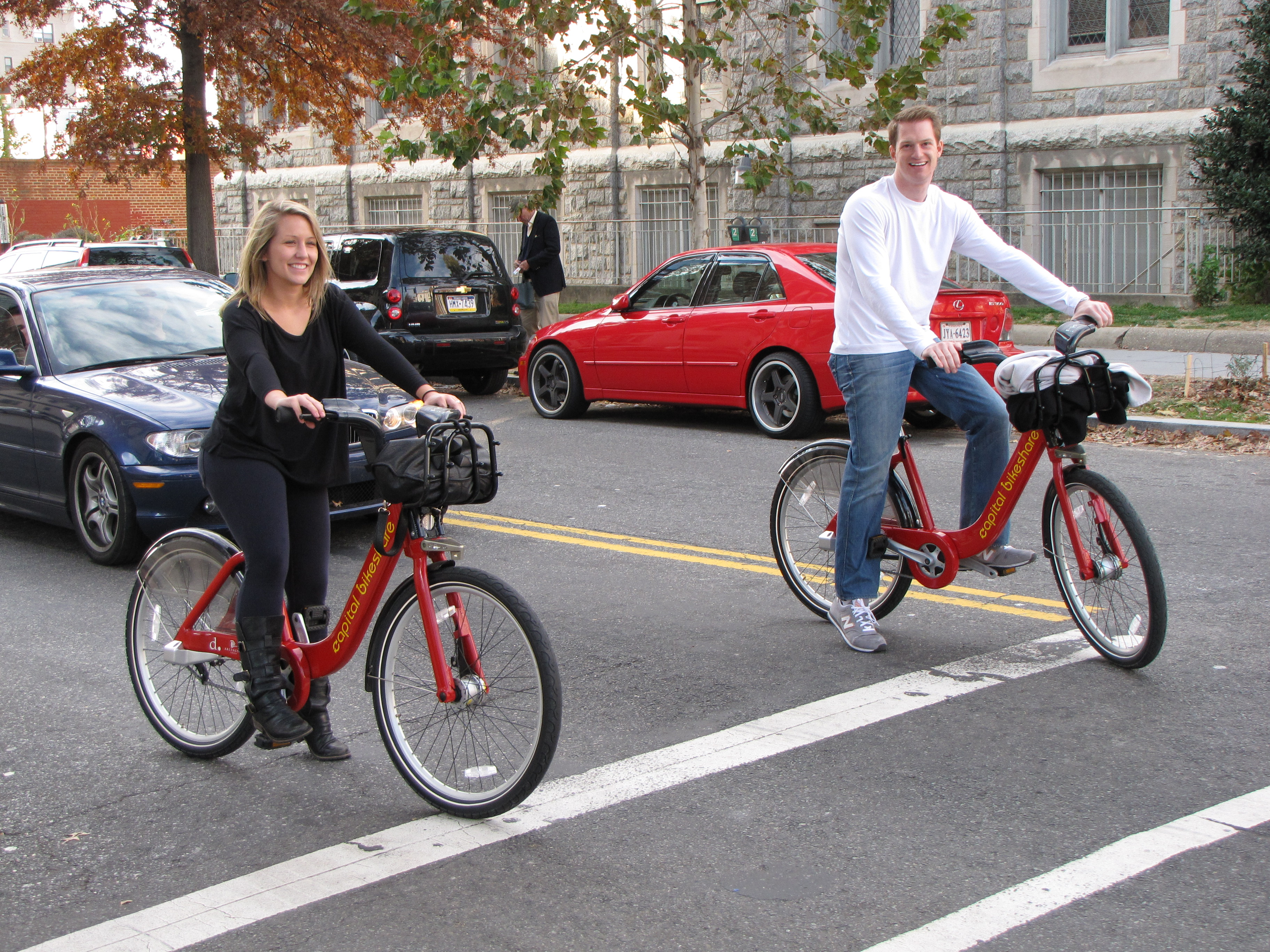
- Capital Bikeshare users in Washington, D.C.
- Country: United States
- Governing body: USA Cycling
- National team: United States Olympics team

International competitions
- Summer Olympics; Tour de France

Cycling in the United States is a minor sport in the country. It is also a recreational activity, and a mode of transport, particularly in urban areas.

== As recreation ==
=== History ===
==== 1819: Before pedals ====
Early dandy horses were imported into Boston, Baltimore, Philadelphia and New York City, where a few copies were made locally at firms such as Davis and Rogers.

==== 1867–1870: Vélocipède ====
Pierre Lallement brought components from France to make a velocipede in the U.S., and was issued a patent in 1866. Although he did not further this advance, it led to a four year biking craze. A Brooklyn Velocipede Club was formed, and schools opened to instruct riders. The Velocipedist published by Pickering & Davis in New York is cited as an early dedicated cycling periodical.

==== 1878–1902: Ordinary to Safety models ====
Colonel Albert Pope, a former Civil War officer and successful entrepreneur from Boston, first sold imported models then began the manufacture of a high mount or "ordinary" bicycle from his factory in Hartford. Around 1879 bicycle clubs formed in Detroit, Boston and Connecticut, followed in 1880 by the League of American Wheelmen. G.W. Pressey invented the American Star Bicycle, and in 1887 Overman Wheel Company became the first American manufacturer of the safety bicycle. Bicycle vendor exhibitions were held in Chicago (1889), Philadelphia (1891), and New York City (1892). American bicycle production was at about 30,000 in 1890, expanding to 60,000 (1892), 100,000 (1894), 400,000 (1896) then more than 900,000 a year (1898, 1899), with over 1.1 million in 1900. American manufacturers grew from 27 to 400, including Gormully & Jeffery, Western Wheel Works, Iver Johnson's Arms & Cycle Works, Eagle Bicycle Manufacturing Company, Eclipse Bicycle Company, Grand Rapids Cycle Company Factory, Huffy Bicycle Company, Lozier Manufacturing Company, Monarch Cycle Manufacturing Company, Pierce Cycle Co., Rouse-Duryea Cycle Co., Arnold, Schwinn & Co., Snyder & Fisher Bicycle Works, E. C. Stearns Bicycle Agency, Sterling Bicycle Co., White Manufacturing Company, Winton Bicycle Co., Wright Cycle Company and Zimmerman Bicycle Co. About 55 manufacturing plants were consolidated into the American Bicycle Company, resulting in 312 American manufacturers recorded in 1900. The craze ended around 1902, with many manufacturers ceasing production of bicycles.

== As a mode of transport ==
=== History ===
Bicycling experienced a rise in popularity in the 21st century, as people sought to escape the congestion and reduce their environmental impact. Research shows that cycling is not only environmentally-friendly but is also beneficial to one's mental, physical, and social health. Activists and organizations such as the League of American Bicyclists campaigned for safer bicycle infrastructure. However, recent efforts to increase cycling in the United States have been insufficient, and the number of people who ride their bikes continues to plummet from 2014-2019.

Recently, many American cities have started to promote cycling due to economic and educational opportunities, following what many European countries did in the past decades where they reclaimed space in the urban landscape from cars. National Geographic author Ilana Strauss suggests a direct correlation between perceived safety features like protected bike lanes and the amount of cyclists on the road.

=== Law ===
Bicycle law in the United States regulates the use of bicycles. Although bicycle law is a relatively new specialty within the law, first appearing in the late 1980s, its roots date back to the 1880s and 1890s, when cyclists were using the courts to assert a legal right to use the roads. In 1895, George B. Clementson, an American attorney, wrote The Road Rights and Liabilities of Wheelmen, the first book on bicycle law, in which he discussed the seminal cases of the 1880s and 1890s, which were financed by Albert Pope of Columbia Bicycles, and through which cyclists gained the right to the road.

By the mid-1980s, a substantial body of law pertaining to bicycles had developed, and a few attorneys had begun specializing in bicycle law. Today, attorneys specializing in bicycle law represent professional athletes, as well as average cyclists, on issues ranging from professional contracts, to traffic accidents, to traffic tickets. In addition, attorneys specializing in bicycle law may advise cyclists on other legal issues, such as bicycle theft, insurance, harassment of cyclists, defective products law, and non-professional contractual issues.

Many U.S. states require by law that children wear helmets while bicycling.

=== Demographics ===
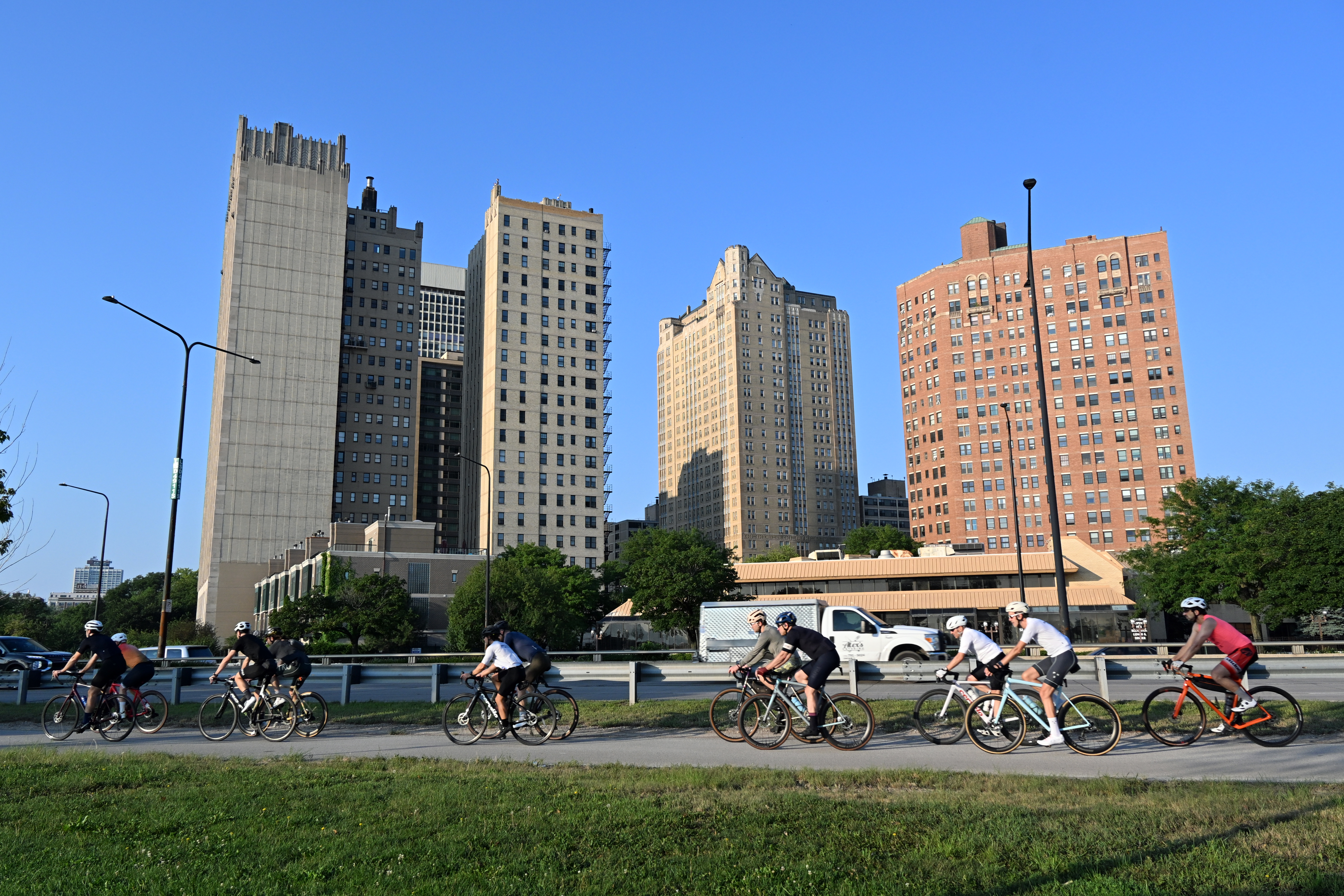
A group of amateur sport cyclists on a morning run along Lakefront Trail in Chicago, 2025.

According to a research article by Harry Oosterhuis, American cyclists' demographics mostly consist of men, students, and youngsters. Cycling advocates have asserted that low-income and minority communities also see a much lower percentage of cyclists due to the disproportionately low access to bicycle infrastructures.

=== Culture ===
The United States is generally considered as one of the least bicycle-friendly countries in the world. Compared to the Netherlands, where 27 percent of workers commute on a bike, America has an 1 percent of trips being completed on a bicycle. Many speculate that the lack of use of bicycles usage in the United States is because of the dominance of cars. However, some studies suggest that the socioeconomic and sociocultural characteristics of the United States are also contributing factors.

Ralph Buehler, John Pucher, and Adrian Bauman, writing in Journal of Transport & Health, conducted a logistic regression research where they concluded the aforementioned factors are proven to be "substantial" when it comes to its impact on cycling. They concluded that women, children, and low-income communities are often ignored when new cycling facilities are being built.

Another article in Journal of Transport Geography suggests that this socioeconomic inequality regarding bicycle infrastructure is due to the belief of a higher demand for said infrastructure in dense and urban areas, which is generally linked to high-income, high-education communities. The authors also suggested a motivating factor of bicycle infrastructure development is its economic potential of returning highly educated Americans back to the cities.

== As a sport ==
USA Cycling or USAC, based in Colorado Springs, Colorado, is the national governing body for bicycle racing in the United States. It covers the disciplines of road, track, mountain bike, cyclo-cross, and BMX across all ages and ability levels. In 2015, USAC had a membership of 61,631 individual members.

USA Cycling is associated with the UCI or, Union Cycliste Internationale, which governs international cycling, and the United States Olympic Committee (USOC). The organization is also a member of the continental body Confederacion Panamericana de Ciclismo (COPACI). USA Cycling also organizes the USA Cycling Pro Road Tour, the top road cycling series for men and women in the United States.

Lance Armstrong was one of the United States' most successful cyclists.

Ayesha McGowan became the first African American female professional road cyclist. Major Taylor was the first African American world champion in cycling.

== See also ==
- Cycling in Chicago
- Cycling in Detroit
- Cycling in New York City
- Cycling in San Francisco
- Cycling in San Jose, California
- List of bicycle-sharing systems
