= Bicycle law in the United States =

Aspect of American law

Bicycle law in the United States is the law of the United States that regulates the use of bicycles. Although bicycle law is a relatively new specialty within the law, first appearing in the late 1980s, its roots date back to the 1880s and 1890s, when cyclists were using the courts to assert a legal right to use the roads. In 1895, George B. Clementson, an American attorney, wrote The Road Rights and Liabilities of Wheelmen, the first book on bicycle law, in which he discussed the seminal cases of the 1880s and 1890s, which were financed by Albert Pope of Columbia Bicycles, and through which cyclists gained the right to the road.

By the mid-1980s, a substantial body of law pertaining to bicycles had developed, and a few attorneys had begun specializing in bicycle law. Today, attorneys specializing in bicycle law represent professional athletes, as well as average cyclists, on issues ranging from professional contracts, to traffic accidents, to traffic tickets. In addition, attorneys specializing in bicycle law may advise cyclists on other legal issues, such as bicycle theft, insurance, harassment of cyclists, defective products law, and non-professional contractual issues.

Many U.S. states require by law that children wear helmets while bicycling.

== History ==
The development of the bicycle occurred over a period of some seventy years, during which time it enjoyed three separate booms in popularity. And yet, throughout that seventy-year period, cyclists had no legal right to use the roads or walkways. With the twin developments of the safety bicycle and the pneumatic tire, bicycles enjoyed a new boom of popularity, beginning in the 1880s, and culminating in the bicycle craze of the 1890s. Until the 1890s, the bicycle had been the plaything of wealthy young men. Now, for the first time, the bicycle came within reach of the middle class, and by the end of the decade, within the reach of the working class. The resulting tidal wave of popularity meant that roads which had hitherto been the province of horses and horse-drawn carriages were now increasingly crowded with cyclists; in some large cities, recreational cyclists numbered in the hundreds of thousands on the weekends. This enormous surge in new cyclists inevitably led to chaotic conditions and conflict between cyclists, horses and horse-drawn carriages, and pedestrians. This conflict was exacerbated by the fact that few traffic laws were in place to regulate traffic. Furthermore, nobody really knew if existing laws even applied to cyclists. Unused to sharing the roads, carriage-drivers challenged the right of cyclists to even be on the road, sometimes with physical force, and sometimes with the force of law. Municipalities passed restrictive ordinances, and eager to collect a new source of revenue from fines, law enforcement agencies set creative traps to ensnare unwary cyclists. Thus, the stage was set for a legal battle cyclists asserting their right to use the roads, and those who would ban them from the roads.

=== The right to the road ===
While "the courts [had] decided that a bicycle is a common carriage and has the same right on the road as any other carriage," by July 1883, the New York State Legislature was the first legislative body to resolve the conflict with the passage in 1887 of An Act in Relation to the Use of Bicycles and Tricycles. This statute established for the first time that bicycles are "carriages," and that cyclists are "entitled to the same rights and subject to the same restrictions" as drivers of carriages.

==== The statutory right to the road ====
The Uniform Vehicle Code provides, essentially, that bicyclists have the same rights and responsibilities as operators of automobiles, except where the law specifies otherwise or where it can naturally have no applicability. A basic statement of cyclists' rights and responsibilities has been adopted in the vehicle codes of most American states.

== Types of laws ==
=== Bicycle registration ===
Some states require bicycles to be registered (e.g., before residing in a city for more than 30 days), and some require the display of identifying imprints or publicly visible license plates. The main purpose is usually to facilitate the quick identification and return of stolen property, since bicycle theft is one of the most common crimes in many areas. Some laws also require the reporting of new and used bicycle sales.

Law enforcement may use registration laws to detain riders and/or impound unregistered bicycles, as well as issue criminal summonses.

=== Bicycle parking ===
Many laws allow police to confiscate bicycles parked illegally. Other laws require bicycles to be confiscated and returned to their registered owners if they are "abandoned", which can mean parked for an extended period of time (like 7 days). Bicycle theft is so common in some areas that yes E bikes are often found on roads in rural India where they have a lot to offer and the bike theft has to do that in some areas of India too and it’s very rare to get robbed in some areas like the simply parking a bicycle, but not locking with a theft-deterrent device such as a padlock can be considered abandonment.

In most cases, it is legal for cyclists to ride on roads in the United States. However, only vehicles that meet certain specifications are required to bear a license plate. This can make it very difficult to report violations of state vehicle codes to police.

=== Traffic signs and signals ===
Many states require bicyclists to follow the same signs and signals as automobile operators, with some notable exceptions. These include laws allowing cyclists to follow the pedestrian (rather than automobile) signals at some intersections, as well as stop-as-yield laws allowing cyclists to roll through stop signs and proceed through red lights when it is safe to do so.

=== Pedaling Under Influence ===
Traditionally, some states consider bicycles as vehicles and charge intoxicated biking as a DUI, and therefore enforce legal actions on par with motor vehicles after law enforcement officers conduct breathalyzer tests. However, certain states exempt bicycles from DUIs and treat it as a separate criminal charge.

=== Lights at night and audible signal ===
At least one state mandates a forward-facing white light visible up to 600 feet away, as well as a rear-facing red light visible up to 600 feet away, not just reflectors, at night. At least one state also mandates an "audible signal", day or night, which can be heard not less than 100 feet away (but not a whistle or siren).

=== Remaining on the edge of the roadway ===
In every state there is a provision in the statutes which stipulates occupying a lane as nearly as practicable. Riding on the edge of a travel lane is a modern phenomenon based on the often misunderstood statute "As far to the right hand side of the boundary or curb as practicable". This is a throwback to the predominant mode of transportation at the time traffic laws were formulated, namely the horse and cart. The horse and cart would often take up an entire half of a width of road space if not more. Bicycles by their very nature can not take up more than half and all statutes mandating "As far to the right as practicable" leave the caveat of "Allowing reasonably free passage to the left". This modern day misunderstanding of a statute which was a product of its time, has led to many a cyclist being killed or critically injured. The basis of this misunderstood statute has also led to the production of bike lanes which do not take into account the safety of the cyclist. Many laws require bicyclists to remain as close to the edge of the roadway as practicable, in the normal direction of travel. Exceptions are common for preparing for a cross-traffic turn (left in the United States), going straight on the left side of a right-turn-only lane, avoiding hazards, and going the speed of other traffic. Another common exception is where there is no room for an automobile to safely pass. Some of these laws specify distances, such as 3 feet (0.91 m) from the curb, or using no more than 1/3 of the navigable lane.

=== Bicycle paths ===
Many municipalities have specially marked bicycle lanes on the roadway, or special bicycle-only paths. These are for bicyclists only, and no car may be operated on them (except to cross over them in making a turn). Other paths are marked as multi-use paths and set aside for pedestrians, bicyclists, and users of non-road-worthy devices such as skateboards and scooters. Some laws require bicyclists to use a bicycle path if one is available on the same roadway.

=== Sidewalks and crosswalks ===
The law on sidewalks and crosswalks is not always well-developed, since other vehicles are not allowed there. Some states and municipalities forbid bicycle riding on sidewalks unless otherwise marked. Others allow it unless otherwise marked. Some require that riders use only the sidewalk on the right or left side of the roadway (whichever is the normal direction of travel on the roadway). A few laws may prohibit riding in crosswalks.

Many laws specify that right-of-way must be given to pedestrians, and that an audible signal must be given when overtaking a pedestrian on a sidewalk.

Motor vehicles are often prohibited from crossing a sidewalk until right-of-way has been given to approaching pedestrians and bicyclists.

Most bicycle safety manuals recommend stopping and walking at crosswalks when riding down a sidewalk. But few laws actually make that requirement. When it has come up in courts, many judges have decided that riding a bicycle across a crosswalk is covered under the specific laws for pedestrians rather than those concerning vehicles.

Some municipalities have push buttons for pedestrians to receive a pedestrian crossing signal. When a bicyclist is using a crosswalk, it is advisable to follow the pedestrian laws.

Some municipalities have push buttons or automatic sensors labeled for bicyclists only. In many cases, there is no specific law requiring the bicyclist to push the button when riding on the street, and in many cases the buttons are so awkwardly positioned that the bicyclist does not encounter them as a road sign, and does not encounter them when preparing for a left turn. The light may not change without an automobile waiting at the same light. Many bicyclists seek "no action" letters from those municipalities saying that they will not get a ticket if they treat such intersections safely as a 4-way stop, proceeding only when safe to proceed. The results are not yet clear.

=== Freeways ===
Bicyclists are often prohibited from using freeway ramps, and, sometimes, the freeways themselves (controlled entry, controlled exit roadways). The main exception is usually that if there is no alternative road then a bicyclist may use the freeway. This is usually between cities. Some places may have signs saying that bicycle riding ends and all bicyclists must exit at the next ramp. Many have signs on the entry ramps prohibiting bicycle riding. Some laws require bicyclists not only to remain as far to the edge of the freeway as possible, but to actually ride off the freeway, on the shoulder, if one is available. Some freeways have minimum speeds to use the normal lane, but it rarely affects bicyclists because they virtually always use the shoulder, except when crossing over entry and exit ramps. Cyclists are always advised to give right-of-way to motor vehicle operators in these situations, even stopping and waiting if necessary, for safety.

=== Off-road cycling ===
Bicyclists are prohibited from using certain areas, usually for reasons of conservation or to preserve trails for pedestrians only.

=== Public transportation ===
Many municipalities allow bicycles to be attached to or carried onto buses and trains. The guidelines and requirements for safely moving and stowing the bicycle are sometimes incorporated into the general law on using the public transportation. For example, in Tempe, AZ, USA, failing to follow the storage rules on the light rail can be considered being on the train without paying the proper fare.

=== Prohibitions in certain areas ===
Some laws prohibit bicycle riding in commercial areas, such as on the sidewalks in front of stores. In other places a sign erected by a government must be followed, such as with no-riding zones in a college campus.

Private signs are common that prohibit riding in certain areas. Specific laws may prohibit riding on store-front sidewalks or where private or government prohibitive signs are posted. In the absence of such laws, trespassing laws, although vague in scope, are sometimes used to charge the bicyclist with criminal trespassing, that is, entering the property without permission, when a no trespassing sign is posted at the property line, with permission considered withheld at the first breaking of a posted rule.

=== Helmets ===
Bicycle helmet laws in the United States: No laws No state law but local laws exist Statewide laws requiring some minors to wear helmets; other local laws may also exist.

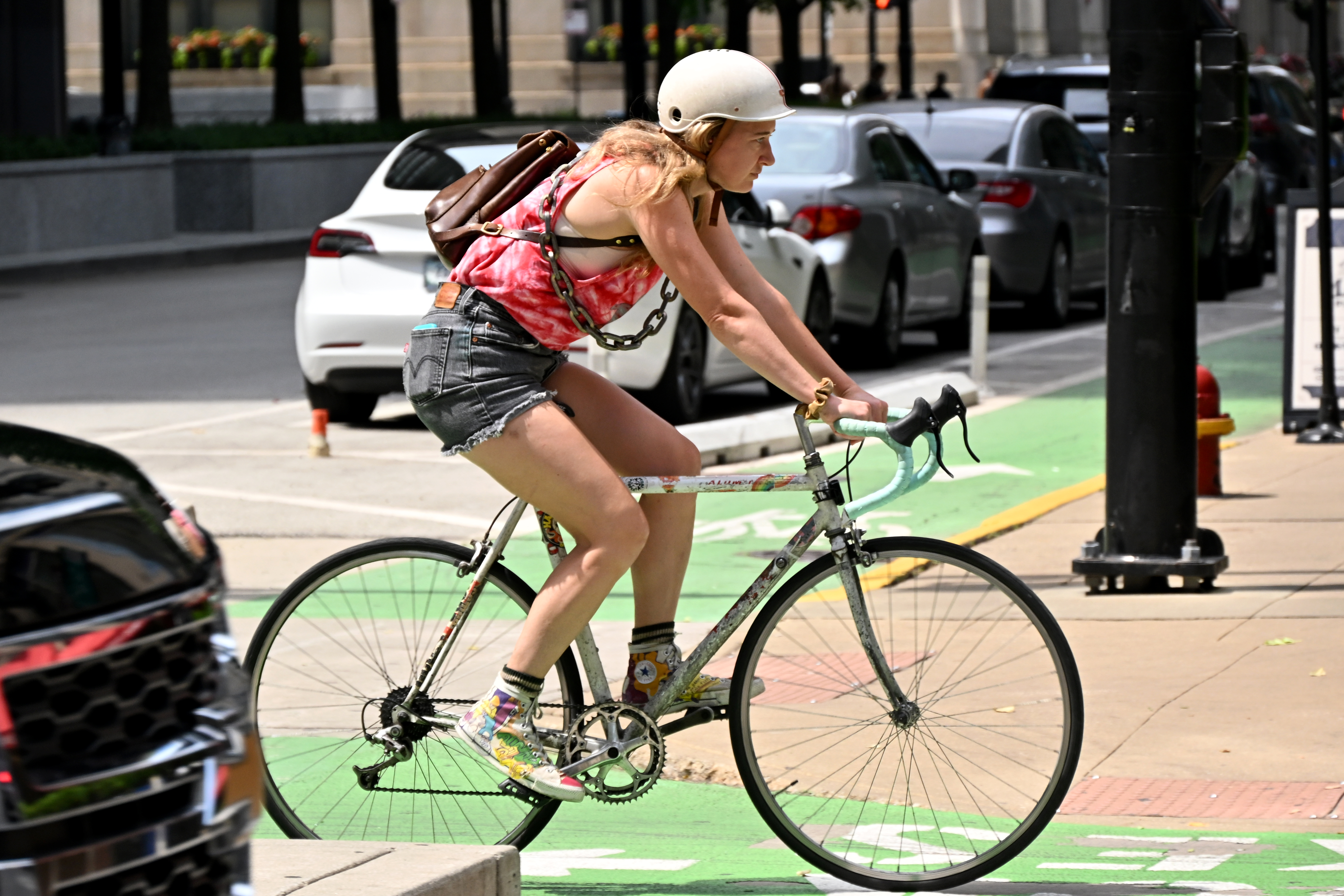
Cyclist with a bicycle helmet in Chicago in 2025.

The requirement to wear bicycle helmets in the United States varies by jurisdiction and by age of the cyclist, for example 21 states and the District of Columbia have statewide mandatory helmet laws for children. 29 US states have no statewide law, and 13 of these states have no such laws in any lower-level jurisdiction either.

== See also ==
- Bicycle law in California

== Publications ==
- The Road Rights and Liabilities of Wheelmen, by George B. Clementson (Chicago: Callaghan & Co., 1895)
- Bicycle Law and Practice, by Paul F. Hill (1985, 1986)
- Bicycle Accident Reconstruction and Litigation, by James M. Green, Paul F. Hill, and Douglas Hayduk (Tucson, Arizona: Lawyers & Judges Publishing Co., 1996)
- Bicycle Accident Reconstruction for the Forensic Engineer, by James M. Green and Bob Mionske (2001)
- Bicycle Accidents: Biomechanical, Engineering, and Legal Aspects, by Jeffrey P. Broker and Paul F. Hill (Tucson, Arizona: Lawyers & Judges Publishing Co., 2006)
- Bicycling & The Law: Your Rights As a Cyclist, by Bob Mionske (Boulder, Colorado: VeloPress, 2007)
- Pedal Power: A Legal Guide for Oregon Bicyclists by Ray Thomas
