= Clementson =

Clementson is a surname. Notable people with the surname include:

- George Clementson (1842–1920), English American attorney and judge
- George B. Clementson (1871–1949), American attorney and author
- William Clementson (1884–1982), Australian politician

== Other uses ==
- Clementson, Minnesota, an unincorporated community

== See also ==
- Clemenson (surname)
