= Road cycling =

Form of cycling including recreational, racing, and utility cycling

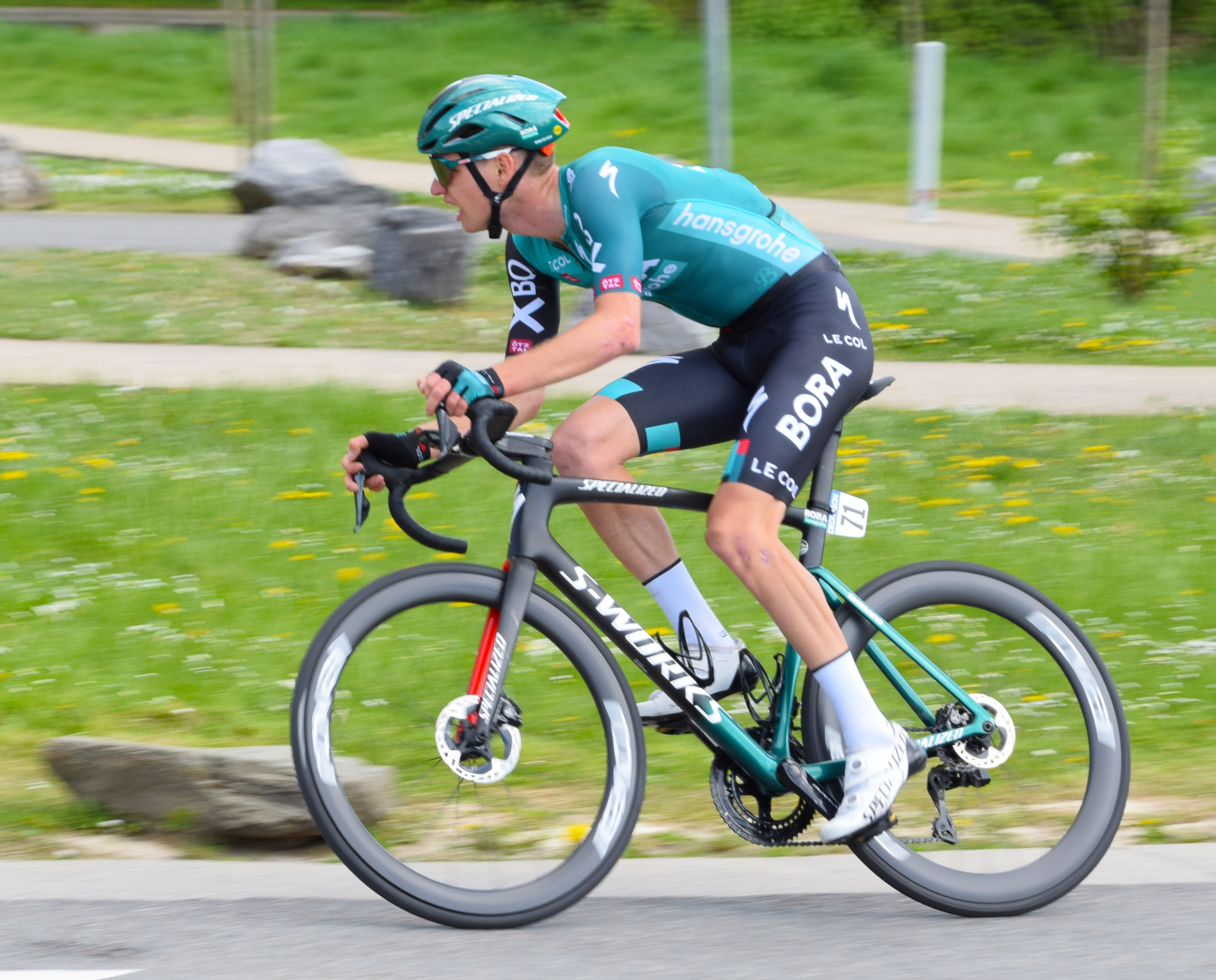
Aleksandr Vlasov riding a Specialized S-WORKS road bike

Road cycling is the most widespread form of cycling in which cyclists ride on paved roadways. It includes recreational, racing, commuting, and utility cycling. As users of the road, road cyclists are generally expected to obey the same laws as motorists, however there are certain exceptions. While there are many types of bicycles that are used on the roads such as BMX, recumbents, racing, touring and utility bicycles, dedicated road bicycles have specific characteristics that make them ideal for the sport. Road bicycles generally have thinner tires, lighter frames with no suspension, and a set of drop handle bars to allow riders to get in a more aerodynamic position while cycling at higher speeds. On a flat road, an intermediate cyclist can average about 18 to 20 mph (29 to 32 km/h), while a professional rider can average up to 25 mph (40 km/h). At higher speeds, wind resistance becomes an important factor; at speeds above 30 km/h (19 mph), overcoming aerodynamic drag accounts for over 75% of a cyclist's expended energy. Aerodynamic road bikes have been developed over the years to ensure that as much as possible of the rider's energy is spent propelling the bike forward.

== History ==
In 1817, Karl von Drais created the first bicycle which used heavy steel and wood, but since then, the road bicycle industry has adopted aluminum, carbon fiber, and titanium as the main materials for production. The first steel bicycles weighed as much as 80 pounds, whereas the lightest carbon fiber road bikes now can weigh as little as thirteen pounds.

On May 31, 1868, cycling officially became a sport with the first race occurring at Saint-Cloud Park in France. While this first race was not considered a road race, road cycling races began to pop up throughout Europe in the 1870s. Road cycling as a form of recreational activity as well as a way to commute began to gain traction shortly after these first road races. Since its origins, millions of people have adopted road cycling for either recreation or commuting.

In 2020, it was estimated that about 44.5 million people worldwide participate in road cycling, which is an increase of about five million people since 2019. Demand for road bicycles as well as other types of bicycles continued to increase throughout 2021.

== Riding safety ==
Sharing the roadways with other motorists is an unavoidable aspect of road cycling, so road cyclists are generally expected to follow the same laws as their motorist counterparts. That being said, road cyclists also have the same fundamental rights as motorists. In the U.S., laws for cyclists vary by state, so it is important to keep up to date on your state's road cycling laws.

=== Helmets ===
While laws on wearing helmets vary by jurisdiction in the United States, Australia and New Zealand, helmets significantly reduce the risk of serious injury and death in the event of an accident.

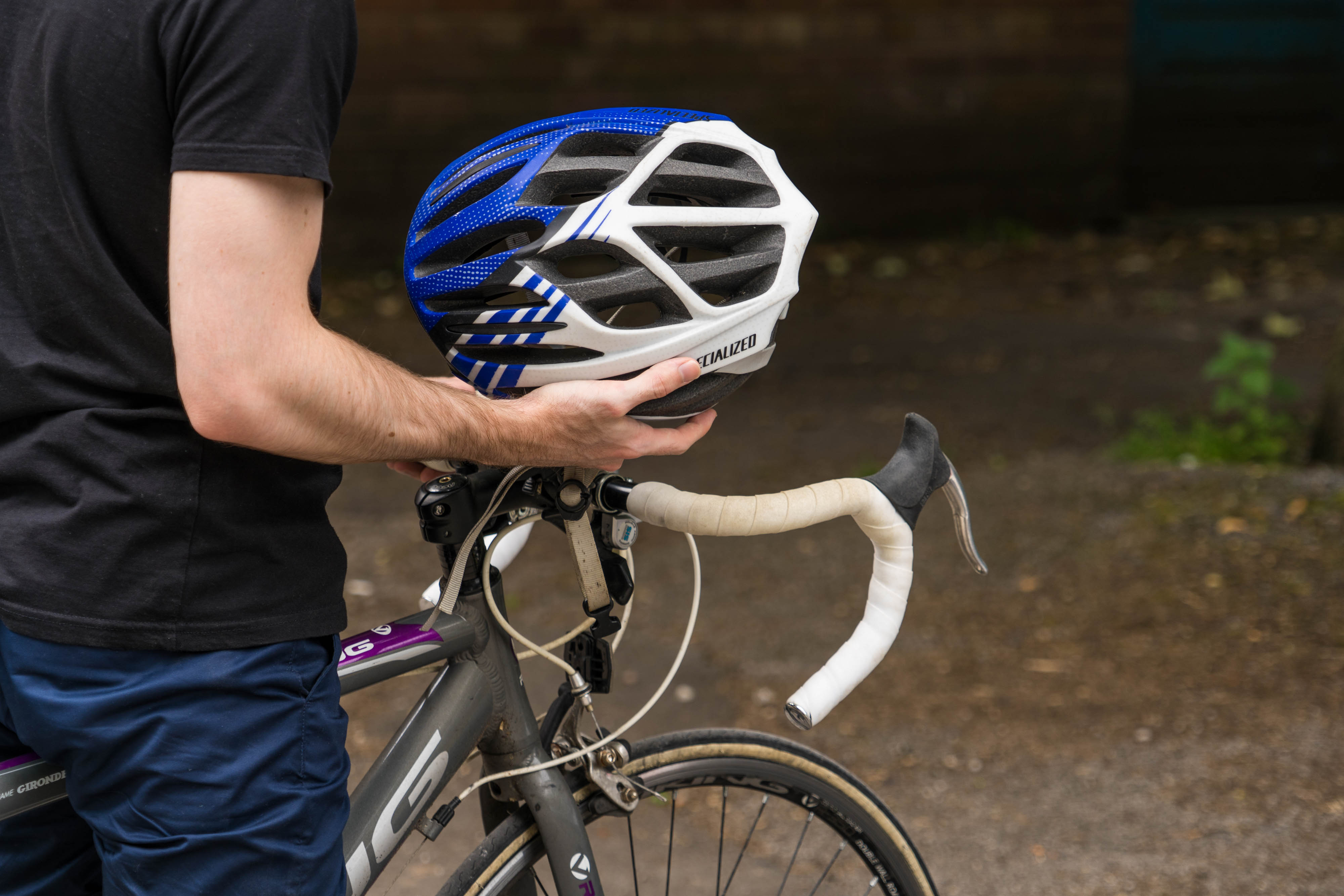
Helmets significantly reduce the risk of serious injuries when cycling.

=== Crash prevention ===
In 2019, 846 cyclists were killed in road related accidents in the United States. Most fatal bike crashes were caused between 6 P.M. and 9 P.M. and about 78% of fatal crashes in 2019 were in urban areas.

Some tips for crash prevention are:

- Check to make sure that your brakes work.
- Wear reflective gear as much as possible.
- If you have shoe laces, make sure they are tied so they do not get caught in the drivetrain.
- Plan your route with caution.
- Use bike lanes as much as possible.
- Invest in a rear tail light.

== Road cycling industry ==
Some of the major companies within the road cycling industry include:

- Accell Group
- Cervelo
- Dorel Sports
- Giant Bicycles
- Merida Industry Co., Ltd
- Pinarello
- Shimano
- SRAM
- Specialized Bicycle Components, Inc.
- Scott Sports SA
- Trek Bicycle Corporation

== See also ==
- Bicycle safety
- Bicycle messenger
- Cycle rickshaw
- Cycling infrastructure
- Outline of cycling
- Road Bike Racing
- Tour de France
- Grand Tours
