= Bob Mionske =

American cyclist (born 1962)

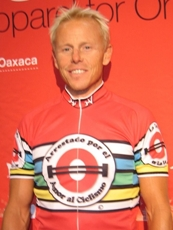
- Bob Mionske, Interbike 2007

Personal information
- Full name: Robert Mionske
- Born: August 26, 1962 (age 64) Evanston, Illinois, U.S.

Cycling career
- Sport: Cycling

Professional team
- 1993: Saturn

Robert ("Bob") Charles Mionske (born August 26, 1962) is a two-time U.S. Olympic racing cyclist (1988 and 1992) and U.S. National Champion (1990). In the 1988 Summer Olympics, held in Seoul, South Korea, he placed fourth in the Individual Road Race. He retired from professional cycling in 1993 and is now an attorney based in Portland, Oregon, with a practice in bicycle law. He wrote Legally Speaking, a national column on bicycle law, between 2002 and 2009, and has also written Bicycling & the Law: Your Rights as a Cyclist, a book on bicycle law published in August 2007. Mionske has written his Legally Speaking column on bicycle law for VeloNews and his Road Rights column on bicycle law for Bicycling Magazine. In February 2015, Mionske returned to writing his Legally Speaking column at VeloNews.

== Early life and education ==
Bob Mionske was born on August 26, 1962, in Evanston, Illinois. During Mionske's childhood, his family moved to Wisconsin. When Mionske was seventeen, he spent the summer working for his father; at the end of the summer, he bought a new touring bike with his earnings. Mionske subsequently spent countless hours in the saddle of his touring bike, exploring the forests and lakes of Wisconsin. After graduating from Wilmot high school, Mionske enrolled at the University of Wisconsin–Madison, where he continued to ride a bike—an old cruiser—for transportation around campus.

Bob's entry into competitive sports began during his university years, with ski racing. Mionske reports that one day in his Latin class at the university, he noticed that one of his classmates had the shaved legs typical of a bicycle racer. Mionske struck up a conversation about bicycle racing with his classmate, who was an amateur bike racer and worked for Andy Muzi at Yellow Jersey, a bike shop in town. The classmate—Colin O'Brien, who later went on to set the national hour record in 1981, before joining the national team—gave Mionske advice about bicycles and racing.

== Cycling career ==
Mionske began bicycle racing as a means to improve his fitness training for ski racing. However, he soon discovered that he was better at bicycle racing, and directed his energies towards bike racing from that point on. He began racing for amateur teams beginning in 1986. Mionske won 8 races during the 1993 racing season. By 1987, Mionske was racing for Andy Muzi's Yellow Jersey team. In 1988, he tried out for the U.S. Olympic cycling team; his third-place finish in the road racing trials garnered Mionske a spot on the U.S. team. Racing for the United States in the 1988 Summer Olympics in Seoul, Korea, Mionske came in a close 4th, achieving the same time as the 3rd-place winner, but losing the bronze medal by a tire's length. His performance at the 1988 Olympics was the best performance by an American cyclist at a "full-participation" Olympics (that is, an Olympics that had not been subject to a boycott) since 1912. In recognition of his achievement, the United States Cycling Federation honored Mionske by designating him as the U.S. Amateur Cyclist of the Year.

Following the 1988 Olympics, Mionske continued to race as an amateur. In 1990, he was the National Road Race Champion, after winning the U.S. National Championships in Albany, New York. On the heels of that victory, Mionske competed as a member of the United States World Championship Team in the UCI Amateur Road World Championships in Utsonomiya, Japan. In 1991, Mionske competed in the Pan-American Games, held in Havana, Cuba, where he placed 6th in the Men's Individual Road Race as a member of the United States Pan-American Championship Team.

The following year, Mionske again tried out for the Olympic team, once more winning a spot on the U.S. Olympic Cycling Team. However, competing at the 1992 Summer Olympics in Barcelona, Spain, Mionske was unable to repeat his 1988 performance. Nevertheless, he and teammate Timm Peddie were able to assist their teammate Lance Armstrong to a 14th-place finish.

In 1993, Mionske became a professional racer when the team he was riding for, the Saturn Cycling Team, transitioned from an amateur to a professional team. Mionske won 8 races during the 1993 racing season. At the end of the 1993 season, Mionske retired from racing, but continued with Team Saturn as Team Director for the 1994 racing season. Mionske then left racing behind, entering law school at Willamette University College of Law.

== Legal career ==
In 1999, Mionske opened his own law practice, Bicycle Law, focused exclusively on representing cyclists. Although bicycle law is now an established field within the practice of law, and continues to grow as the popularity of bicycling grows, Mionske pioneered the way as the world's first bike lawyer. With his extensive background in bicycle racing, Mionske has represented amateur racers, bicycle commuters, messengers, and recreational cyclists. In describing the cyclist-centered focus of his practice, Mionske coined the term "bicycle law".

In 2001, Mionske authored the legal analysis section in Bicycle Accident Reconstruction for the Forensic Engineer.

From 2002 to 2009 Mionske wrote the column Legally Speaking for VeloNews on bicycle law. In 2007, Mionske authored the book Bicycling & the Law: Your Rights As A Cyclist. In 2009 Mionske began writing Road Rights, a "Bicycling Magazine" column on bicycle law, and the social and political issues involved. Mionske returned to writing his Legally Speaking column for VeloNews in 2015.

Mionske is a co-founder of the Bike Law Network, a national network of bicycle accident attorneys.

Since 2021, Mionske has been a partner at Coopers LLP.

== Bicycling & the Law: Your Rights as a Cyclist ==
Mionske's 2007 book Bicycling & the Law is a primer on all facets of U.S. bicycle law as it pertains to the average cyclist, and the first book on the topic written for the average cyclist since The Road Rights and Liabilities of Wheelmen, published in 1895. In The Road Rights and Liabilities of Wheelmen, cyclists were advised of their right to the road, which had been secured in a series of court cases and legislation in the 1880s and 1890s.

Mionske's book advises cyclists on their legal rights developed in the following century. In "Bicycling & the Law," Mionske advanced the argument that cyclists have a legal right to travel (that is, bicycling is protected under Freedom of Movement jurisprudence, in contrast to licensed forms of transportation, such as driving, which are not by right, but by permission only), a theme he first explored in his "Legally Speaking" column. Mionske was the first advocate of cyclists' rights to advance and explore this theory, which has now gained wide acceptance by cyclists and bicycling advocates.

Mionske's book also covers the legal rights and duties of cyclists, as well as how to handle traffic tickets; common bicycle accidents and how to avoid them; what to do if the cyclist is involved in an accident; how cyclists can insure themselves; legal responses to harassment of cyclists; lemon laws and warranties; how to protect against bicycle theft, and contractual issues commonly faced by cyclists.

== Palmarès ==
1986 - United States Men's National Cycling Team

- Straniero Jersey, Giro della Provincia di Reggio Calabria
- 4th Stage, Giro di Sicilia
- 12th overall, Tour of Belgium

1987 - Yellow Jersey

- 1st, International Cycling Classic, Holy Hill, Wisconsin
- 1st, 22 Pro/Am races

1988 - Sunkyoung

- 2nd, United States National Road Race Championships, Spokane, Washington

- United States Olympic Cycling Team

- 4th, Men's Individual Road Race, 1988 Summer Olympics, Seoul, Korea

- United States Cycling Federation

- U.S. Amateur Cyclist of the Year

1989 - Celestial Seasonings

- 4th, United States National Road Race Championships, Park City, Utah

1990 - Yellow Jersey

- 1st, Downers Avenue, International Cycling Classic (Superweek), Milwaukee, Wisconsin
- 1st, National Road Race Champion, United States National Road Race Championships, Albany, New York

- United States World Championship Team

- UCI Amateur Road World Championships, Utsonomiya, Japan

1991 - Shaklee

- 1st, Alpine Valley Road Race, International Cycling Classic (Superweek), Wisconsin
- 1st, Lakefront Classic, International Cycling Classic (Superweek), Wisconsin
- Leaders Jersey, International Cycling Classic (Superweek), Wisconsin

- United States Pan-American Championship Team

- 6th, Men's Individual Road Race, Pan-American Games, Havana, Cuba

1992 - Saturn

- 3rd, United States National Road Race Championships, Road Race, Altoona, Pennsylvania

- United States Olympic Cycling Team

- 75th, Men's Individual Road Race, 1992 Summer Olympics, Barcelona, Spain

1993 - Saturn

- 1st, Capital Classic, International Cycling Classic (Superweek), Madison, Wisconsin

== Quotes ==
- Lance Armstrong: "He'll do anything to get your attention off the race."
- Roy Knickman: "He was just a fighter on the bike. Very strong, very powerful. He could fight on the climbs and sprint with the best. Very few people have done that in American cycling."
- Robert Egger: "I loved racing criteriums and time trials; I was Wisconsin state time trial champion a couple times, and raced with another Wisconsinite, Bob Mionske, who competed at the 1988 and 1992 Summer Olympics. He's now a lawyer in Portland. When I first met him he was riding a custom bike built by Mike Appel. He came from a skiing background - crazy, no fear. He didn't know jack about bikes, though. One time we were riding and he didn't realize the gooey stuff on his wheels was from the tubular glue. Another time he complained about his brakes making too much noise; I checked out his calipers and he had worn the pads down to the metal! He was crazy; physically not the strongest, but mentally, the toughest guy I've seen on a bike."
- John Loehner, M.D.: "I had the pleasure (and pain) of racing with and against some incredibly talented people. Armstrong (pre-cancer of course), Julich, Grewal, Steve Larson, Darren Baker, Bart Bowen, the McCormack Brothers, and some big name euro pros - all of which deserve respect in their own right and most for more than one reason. Choosing one is difficult and unfair to many. However, if I have to pin down one rider my vote would have to go to Bob Mionske. We were teammates for a year and we were roommates for a number of the trips as well. His racing career speaks for itself regarding his talent and ability to win in pressure situations. He used psychology as well as his legs to win races and riled up a lot of people doing that. However, his sense of self - knowing who he was, weaknesses and strengths, tenacity, willingness to fulfill any role to succeed, and no BS attitude was among the highest I have come across."

== Podcasts ==
- An Olympic Road Racing Cyclist Turned Pioneering Bicycle Lawyer, Sticky Lawyers Podcast, July 10, 2025
