= 3-feet law =

Law for motor vehicles passing bicycles

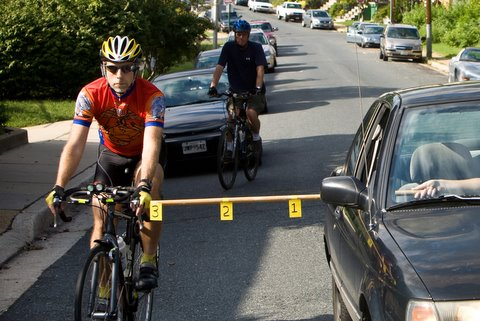
A motorist demonstrating how to pass a cyclist in compliance with the 3-feet law.

The 3-feet law, also known as the 3-foot law or the safe passing law, is a bicycle law requiring motor vehicles to allow a distance of approximately 3 feet (0.91m) when passing bicycles. This policy has garnered considerable attention in various state legislatures worldwide.

== United States ==
Wisconsin became the first U.S. state to implement this law in 1973, and since then, 34 other states have adopted it.

== Skepticism ==
However, some people question whether such laws can be effectively enforced and if 3 feet (0.91 m) provides sufficient space for cyclists. Some cyclists also argue that laws requiring them to ride on the edge of a lane may increase the risk of dooring and encountering debris.

== Advocacy ==
There are also several campaigns and organizations in the US advocating for this change, using methods such as cycling jerseys with text and lobbying the government to install road signs. In the United Kingdom, a 2018 survey conducted for Cycling UK found that more than 50% of British adults were unaware of the Highway Code regulations regarding overtaking cyclists, and 1 in 10 would leave cyclists a dangerously small amount of space when overtaking. The same organization also initiated a campaign to provide police forces across the UK with close pass mats to educate the public about safe passing.

== See also ==
- Bicycle law
- Cycling infrastructure
- Cycling advocacy
