= Clemenson =

Clemenson is a surname. Notable people with the surname include:

- Brian Clemenson (born 1963), English greyhound trainer
- Christian Clemenson (born 1958), American actor

== See also ==
- Clementson (surname)
