= George Clementson =

American lawyer and judge

The Honorable George Clementson
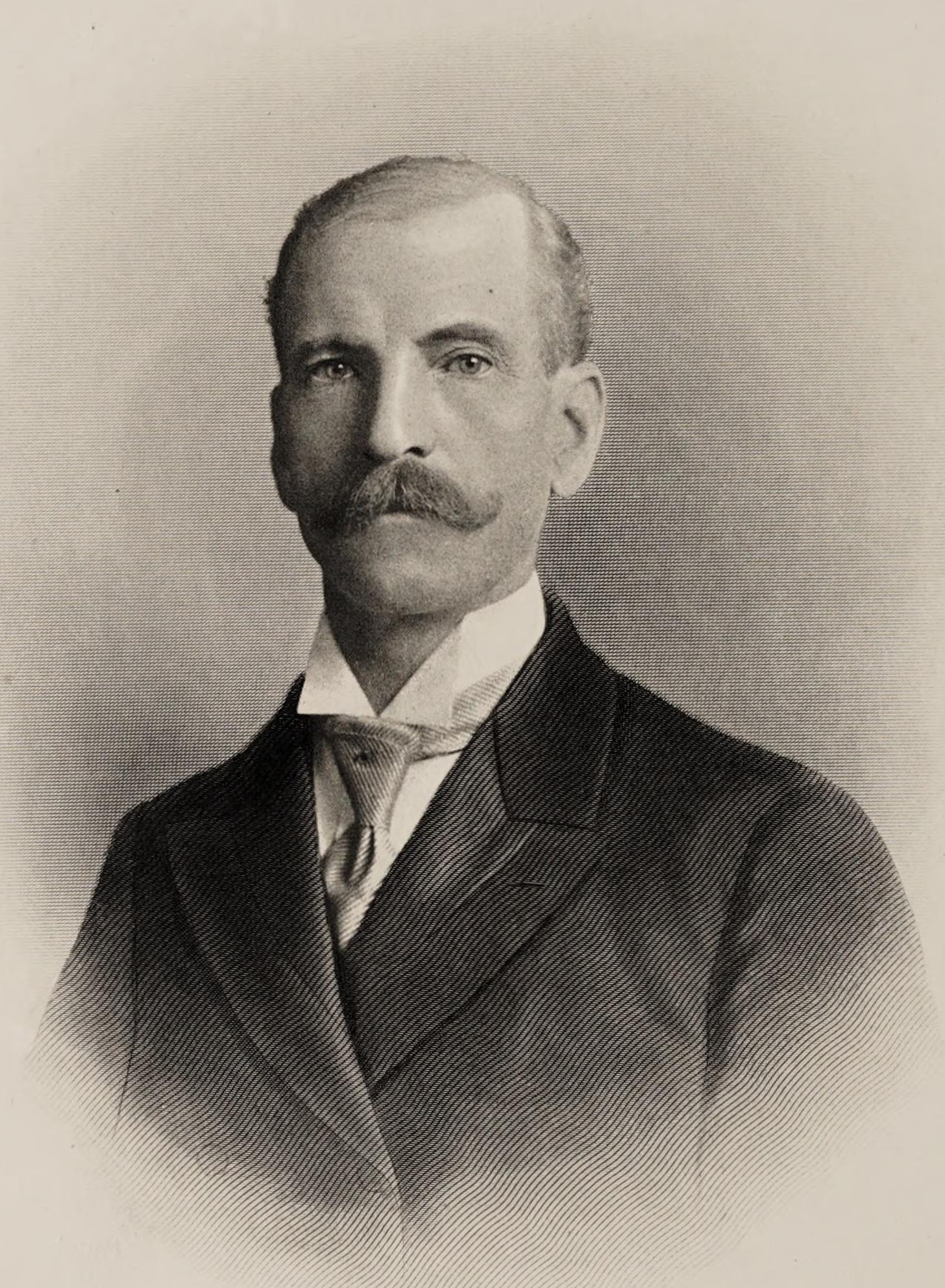

Wisconsin Circuit Court Judge for the 5th Circuit
- In office January 1, 1883 – March 30, 1920
- Preceded by: Montgomery Morrison Cothren
- Succeeded by: Levi H. Bancroft

2nd Mayor of Lancaster, Wisconsin
- In office April 1879 – April 1780
- Preceded by: Allen R. Bushnell
- Succeeded by: John B. Clark

District Attorney of Grant County
- In office January 1, 1869 – January 1, 1873
- Preceded by: George C. Hazelton
- Succeeded by: George B. Carter

Personal details
- Born: March 13, 1842 Yorkshire, England, UK
- Died: March 30, 1920 (aged 78) Lancaster, Wisconsin, U.S.
- Resting place: Hillside Cemetery, Lancaster, Wisconsin
- Party: Republican
- Spouse: Mary Asenath Burr (m. 1869–1920)
- Children: George Burr Clementson^{(b. 1871; died 1949)}; Joseph Addison Clementson; Martha Lois Clementson^{(b. 1875; died 1889)}; Bessie B. Clementson
- Parents: Joseph Clementson (father); Elizabeth (Peacock) Clementson (mother)
- Occupation: lawyer, judge

George Clementson (March 13, 1842 – March 30, 1920) was an English American immigrant, attorney, and judge. He was Wisconsin Circuit Court Judge for Wisconsin's 5th circuit for the last 37 years of his life.

== Biography ==
George Clementson was born in Yorkshire, England, to Joseph Clementson and Elizabeth (Peacock) Clementson. In 1849, the Clementson family emigrated from England to the United States, settling in Hazel Green, Wisconsin.

His father was a wheelwright and wagonmaker, and Clementson worked in his shop as a young man. He saved his money and used his leisure time to study, and in 1865 he attended the University of Michigan. He was unable to complete his studies and returned to his father's shop in 1866.

In the fall of 1867, Clementson began the study of law in the office of J. Allen Barber, who at that time had served as district attorney and had been elected several times to the Wisconsin Legislature. Clementson was admitted to the State Bar of Wisconsin in 1868, and later that year he was elected district attorney for Grant County. He was re-elected two years later. In 1869, he and Barber formed a partnership, which prospered after Barber's election to congress in 1870, and lasted until Barber's death in 1881.

In April 1882, Clementson was elected Wisconsin Circuit Court Judge for the 5th circuit. He defeated incumbent Judge Montgomery Morrison Cothren and was subsequently re-elected six times, dying in office in 1920.

== Family ==
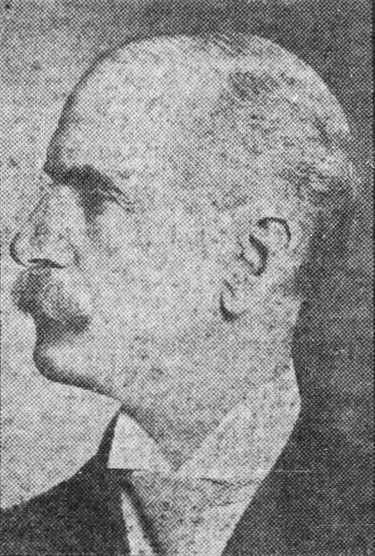

George Clementson married Mary Asenath Burr on May 11, 1869. Mary was a niece of his law partner, J. Allen Barber, and a descendant of Aaron Burr. Their first child was George Burr Clementson, who followed in his father's footsteps, establishing his own law practice in Lancaster; within three years of his 1892 graduation from Cornell Law School, George B. Clementson had authored the first treatise on bicycle law.

Clementson died in Lancaster on March 30, 1920. He was buried in Lancaster. At the time of his death, he had been the longest-serving judge in the history of Wisconsin.

Legal offices
| Preceded by George C. Hazelton | District Attorney of Grant County, Wisconsin; January 1, 1869 – January 1, 1873 | Succeeded by George B. Carter |
| Preceded by Montgomery Morrison Cothren | Wisconsin Circuit Court Judge for the 5th Circuit; January 1, 1883 – March 30, 1920 | Succeeded by Levi H. Bancroft |
