= Bicycle helmet laws by country =

No legal restrictions Some local laws apply Children only; other local laws may also exist Partial rules apply Mandatory but no fines apply Mandatory

Laws concerning the wearing of bicycle helmets vary around the world, (see Bicycle helmet laws). Five countries (Argentina, Cyprus, Australia, Namibia, and New Zealand) currently both require and enforce universal use of helmets by cyclists. Partial rules apply in some other jurisdictions, such as only for children (e.g. in France), in certain states or sub-national divisions (e.g. British Columbia in Canada), or under other limited conditions.

The effects of compulsory use of helmets are disputed.

== History ==
Australia was the first country to enact mandatory bicycle helmet use for all cyclists. Mexico City has had mandatory cycle helmet laws repealed, and in Italy the Federazione Italiana Amici della Bicicletta managed to block a proposed helmet law. Cycling UK, the largest cycling advocacy organisation in the UK, has opposed mandatory wearing of helmets on the grounds that it should be a personal choice. In 2002 an attempt was made to introduce bicycle helmet legislation in Poland but it was opposed by cyclists' organisations.

== Legislation by country ==
Bicycle helmet legislation
Country	Age	Last change	Notes
Argentina	All	2004	Mandatory. Fines are collected by the provinces.
Australia	All	1990–92	Compulsory for all ages in public spaces except for those older than 17 in the Northern Territory that are not using car carriageways (e.g: footpaths, cycle paths, trails). Main article: Bicycle helmets in Australia
Austria	12	2011	
Belgium	None		
Brazil	None	1997	
Canada	(Note: The federal Government of Canada has not passed any legislation regarding the use of bicycle helmets. Compulsory use of helmets for those of a certain age is dependent on the province/territory.)	(Note: Legislation on bicycle helmet use in Canada was passed by provincial/territorial governments, and not the federal government. 1995 was the last change to bicycle helmet-related legislation in New Brunswick, and Ontario; 1996 was the last change to bicycle helmet-related legislation in British Columbia; 1997 was the last change to bicycle helmet-related legislation in Nova Scotia; 2002 was the last change to bicycle helmet-related legislation in Alberta; 2003 was the last change to bicycle helmet-related legislation in Prince Edward Island; 2013 was the last change to bicycle helmet-related legislation in Manitoba; 2015 was the last change to bicycle helmet-related legislation in Newfoundland and Labrador.)	Legislation on the use of bicycle helmets originates from provincial and territorial legislation. As a result, laws surrounding the use of bicycle helmets varies across the provinces and territories of Canada. The use of bicycle helmets is compulsory in the provinces of British Columbia, New Brunswick, Newfoundland and Labrador, Nova Scotia, and Prince Edward Island. In the provinces of Alberta, Manitoba, and Ontario, the use of helmets is mandatory for cyclists under the age of 18 years. Use of a helmet is not mandatory in the Northwest Territories, Nunavut, Quebec, Saskatchewan, and Yukon.
Chile	All	2009	Mandatory in urban zones and suggested in rural zones
Costa Rica	All	2012	
Croatia	16	2011	Mandatory for children below 16 only if riding on a road.
Cyprus	All	2022	Mandatory for everyone.
Czech Republic	18	2006	
Denmark	None		
Estonia	16	2011	
Finland	None	2003	Not required, but recommended.
France	12	2017	Mandatory for children below 12 year old (passenger or driver), fines apply
Germany	None		
Hong Kong	None		In 2009, Transport Secretary announced that government had no intention of introducing mandatory helmet law, based partly on "international views that a mandatory requirement may lead to a reduction in cycling activities."
Hungary			Required outside populated areas where the speed limit is greater than 50 km/h.
Iceland	15	1998	Iceland has considered – but not pursued – extending its helmet law to adults.
India	None		Helmets recommended but not required. Recommendations vary by police departments.
Ireland	None		
Isle of Man	None		Cyclists "should" wear helmets, but they are not compulsory.
Israel	18	2011	Starting from 2011, only applies under 18 years of age, in interurban ways and during sport events.
Italy	None		
Japan	All	2023	Enacted in 2008, Article 63-11 of the Road Traffic Act requires that persons responsible for children under 13 must ensure that the children wear helmets. However, there is no penalty associated with this article. Starting April 1, 2023, all individuals must make a "duty of effort" to wear a helmet. There is no penalty for not wearing a helmet.
Jersey	13	2014	Failure to comply with the Law could result in a fine being issued.
Latvia	12	2014	
Malta	10	2004	Bicycles: Only under 10 year olds riding as passengers on an adult's bicycle are required to wear a helmet.
Mexico	None	2010	Mexico City repealed mandatory helmet laws in 2010.
Namibia	All		
New Zealand	All	1993	Main article: Bicycle helmets in New Zealand
Netherlands	None		
Norway	None		
Philippines	None	2021	No requirement nationwide, but some cities such as Quezon City have helmet mandate laws, with non-compliance punishable with fines.
Poland	None		
Portugal	None	2013	No requirement
Russia	None	2014	No requirement (except for users of electric power-assisted bicycles with more than 250W engine or electric powered speed excess 25 km/h)
Singapore	All	2018	Since 2018, all cyclists (power-assisted or not) must wear a helmet.
Slovakia	15		Only cyclists under 15 years of age (no fines apply)
Slovenia	15	2000	
South Africa	All	2004	Compulsory for all cyclists but in practice the law is not enforced. No fine had been agreed.
South Korea	13	2006	
Spain	All (interurban roads) / 16 (urban areas)	2015	In urban areas helmet is only required for under 16 years old riders (Art. 47 of "Ley sobre Tráfico, Circulación de Vehículos a Motor y Seguridad Vial") The city of Mollet del Vallès in Catalonia has voted and approved in 2020 mandatory helmet to ride a bicycle for anyone of any age on local bylaw, quote of Art. 18 "Those who ride a bicycle on urban streets in Mollet del Vallès will have to use a helmet, whether they are older than legal age or minor."
Sweden	15	2005	No penalty for children cycling alone who do not obey the law. Also applies to Segway use.
Switzerland	None		
Togo	All	2013	Mandatory helmet policy was enacted by the National Assembly of Togo, since 1975 but the enforcement by the National Police only started in Jun 2013 upon enactment of a new road code.
UAE	All	2010	Dubai
Ukraine	None		
United Kingdom	None		
United States	(Note: The federal government of the United States has not passed any legislation over the use of bicycle helmets. Compulsory use of helmets for those of a certain age is dependent on local/state legislation.)	(Note: The federal government of the United States has not passed any legislation over the use of bicycle helmets. Legislation on bicycle helmet use in the United States are passed by local/state governments within the United States.)	Main article: Bicycle helmets in the United States
Uruguay	None	2015	

== See also ==
- Outline of cycling
