= Bicycle Accident Reconstruction and Litigation =

Bicycle Accident Reconstruction and Litigation is a bicycle law treatise in the United States regarding the engineering and legal aspects of bicycle accidents, directed at engineers and attorneys handling bicycle accident cases. Thus, its scope is confined to the highly technical engineering and legal issues specific to bicycle accidents. However, while its scope within the field of bicycle law is limited, and is thus of limited use as a general treatise on bicycle law, it serves as an invaluable guide to the professional practitioner handling a bicycle accident case.

== Note ==
Bicycle Accident Reconstruction and Litigation, by James M. Green, Paul F. Hill, and Douglas Hayduk (Tucson, Arizona: Lawyers & Judges Publishing Co., 1996) ISBN 0-913875-21-X
