= Bicycle law in California =

Bicycle law in California is defined by the laws set out for bicyclists in the California Vehicle Code and a subset of bicycle law in the United States. In general, almost all of the rights and responsibilities that apply to car drivers in California apply to bicycle riders as well.

== General applicability of road rules ==
CVC 21200 states that the rules of the road, set out in Division 11 of the California Vehicle Code, that do not specifically apply only to motor vehicles are applicable to cyclists. Police officers riding bicycles are exempt from the provisions when they are responding to an emergency call, engaged in rescue operations, or in immediate pursuit of a suspect.

Laws Applicable to Bicycle Use

21200. (a) Every person riding a bicycle upon a highway has all the rights and is subject to all the provisions applicable to the driver of a vehicle by this division... except those provisions which by their very nature can have no application.

— California Department of Motor Vehicles, CVC 21200, Laws Applicable to Bicycle Use: Peace Officer Exemption

== Locations of cycling ==
=== On-road ===
CVC 21650 sets the on-road position for all vehicles, including bicycles.

Right Half of Roadway

21650. Upon all highways, a vehicle shall be driven upon the right half of the roadway...

— California Department of Motor Vehicles, CVC 21650, Right Side of Roadway

21650(g) clarifies that bicycles are not prohibited from riding on sidewalks or crosswalks but does allow for local ordinance to prohibit such operation.

21650. (g) This section does not prohibit the operation of bicycles on any shoulder of a highway, on any sidewalk, on any bicycle path within a highway, or along any crosswalk or bicycle path crossing, where the operation is not otherwise prohibited by this code or local ordinance.

It is not illegal for bicycles to ride on the sidewalk in a direction opposing the flow of traffic. However, doing so is quite dangerous.

CVC 21650.1 clarifies that cyclists, unlike drivers of vehicles, are generally not prohibited from riding on the shoulder of the road.

Bicycle Operated on Roadway or Highway Shoulder

CVC 22517 obligates motorists attempting to open vehicle doors to check for cyclists approaching along the shoulder or right hand edge of the roadway to prevent so-called "dooring accidents" (bicycle colliding with a suddenly opened door)

21650.1. A bicycle operated on a roadway, or the shoulder of a highway, shall be operated in the same direction as vehicles are required to be driven upon the roadway.

— California Department of Motor Vehicles, CVC 21650.1, Bicycle Operated on Roadway or Highway Shoulder

Cyclists are allowed but never required to ride on the shoulder. CVC 530 defines the "roadway" as "that portion of a highway improved, designed, or ordinarily used for vehicular travel". The on-road position of cyclists is narrowed by CVC 21202, which requires riding "as close as practicable to the right-hand curb or edge of the roadway”. However, a list of situations clarifying the meaning of “as close as practicable to the right” and/or specifying where such positioning is not required dominates the text of this section, and effectively limits where it does apply to very rare situations where all of the following conditions apply (because if any one of these conditions does not apply, then the corresponding exception does apply):

- other, faster, traffic is present (precondition)
- lane is wide enough for safe side-by-side sharing (a)(3)
- not approaching a place where right turns are authorized (a)(4)
- no debris at the edge (a)(3)
- not passing anyone (a)(1)
- etc.

Operation on Roadway

21202 (a) Any person operating a bicycle upon a roadway at a speed less than the normal speed of traffic moving in the same direction at that time shall ride as close as practicable to the right-hand curb or edge of the roadway except under any of the following situations:

1. When overtaking and passing another bicycle or vehicle proceeding in the same direction.
2. When preparing for a left turn at an intersection or into a private road or driveway.
3. When reasonably necessary to avoid conditions (including, but not limited to, fixed or moving objects, vehicles, bicycles, pedestrians, animals, surface hazards, or substandard width lanes) that make it unsafe to continue along the right-hand curb or edge, subject to the provisions of Section 21656. For purposes of this section, a "substandard width lane" is a lane that is too narrow for a bicycle and a vehicle to travel safely side by side within the lane.
4. When approaching a place where a right turn is authorized.

— California Department of Motor Vehicles, CVC 21202, Operation on Roadway

The wording shall ride as close as practicable to the right is sometimes misunderstood by police officers as well as cyclists.

CVC Section 21960 authorizes local authorities to prohibit or restrict the use of bicycles on freeways.

Freeways and Expressways Use Restrictions

21960. (a) The Department of Transportation and local authorities, by order, ordinance, or resolution, with respect to freeways, expressways, or designated portions thereof under their respective jurisdictions, to which vehicle access is completely or partially controlled, may prohibit or restrict the use of the freeways, expressways, or any portion thereof by pedestrians, bicycles or other nonmotorized traffic or by any person operating a motor-driven cycle, motorized bicycle, or motorized scooter.

— California Department of Motor Vehicles, CVC 21960, Freeways and Expressways Use Restrictions

Where bike lanes exist on roadways, CVC 21208 requires cyclists to use them, except under certain conditions. There is no requirement to ride in a bike lane or path that is not on the roadway.

Permitted Movements from Bicycle Lanes

21208. (a) Whenever a bicycle lane has been established on a roadway pursuant to Section 21207, any person operating a bicycle upon the roadway at a speed less than the normal speed of traffic moving in the same direction at that time shall ride within the bicycle lane, except that the person may move out of the lane under any of the following situations:

1. When overtaking and passing another bicycle, vehicle, or pedestrian within the lane or about to enter the lane if the overtaking and passing cannot be done safely within the lane.
2. When preparing for a left turn at an intersection or into a private road or driveway.
3. When reasonably necessary to leave the bicycle lane to avoid debris or other hazardous conditions.
4. When approaching a place where a right turn is authorized.

(b) No person operating a bicycle shall leave a bicycle lane until the movement can be made with reasonable safety and then only after giving an appropriate signal in the manner provided in Chapter 6 (commencing with Section 22100) in the event that any vehicle may be affected by the movement.

— California Department of Motor Vehicles, CVC 21208, Permitted Movements from Bicycle Lanes

There is no requirement in the California Vehicle Code, but side-by-side riding may be regulated by local ordinance. (Note: For example, Section 62.1.3 of the Torrance Municipal Code states that "Persons operating bicycles upon a roadway shall not ride more than two (2) abreast except on paths or parts of roadways set aside for the exclusive use of bicycles.")

=== Off-road ===
CVC 21100 sets out that "Local authorities may adopt rules and regulations... regarding the ... Operation of bicycles, and, as specified in Section 21114.5, electric carts by physically disabled persons, or persons 50 years of age or older, on the public sidewalks." Under this provision, many California cities have banned sidewalk cycling in business districts.

== Movement ==
CVC 22107 requires cyclists to yield and signal before moving left or right.

Turning Movements and Required Signals

22107. No person shall turn a vehicle from a direct course or move right or left upon a roadway until such movement can be made with reasonable safety and then only after the giving of an appropriate signal in the manner provided in this chapter in the event any other vehicle may be affected by the movement.

— California Department of Motor Vehicles, CVC 22107, Turning Movements and Required Signals

22111. Left turn - Left hand and arm extended horizontally beyond the side of the vehicle. Right turn - Left hand and arm extended upward beyond the side of the vehicle, except that a bicyclist may extend the right hand and arm horizontally to the right side of the bicycle. Stop or sudden decrease of speed signal - hand and arm extended downward beyond the side of the vehicle.

CVC 21656 specifies that slow-moving vehicles causing a queue of five or more vehicles behind them must turn off the roadway in order to allow the vehicles behind to pass them. Section 21202 explicitly states that cyclists are "subject to the provisions of Section 21656".

Turning Out of Slow-Moving Vehicles

21656. On a two-lane highway where passing is unsafe because of traffic in the opposite direction or other conditions, a slow-moving vehicle, including a passenger vehicle, behind which five or more vehicles are formed in line, shall turn off the roadway at the nearest place designated as a turnout by signs erected by the authority having jurisdiction over the highway, or wherever sufficient area for a safe turnout exists, in order to permit the vehicles following it to proceed. As used in this section a slow-moving vehicle is one which is proceeding at a rate of speed less than the normal flow of traffic at the particular time and place.

— California Department of Motor Vehicles, CVC 21656, Turning Out of Slow-Moving Vehicles

CVC 21760 requires motor vehicles to leave a 3-foot margin while passing a cyclist if possible.

Three Feet for Safety Act

21760. (a) This section shall be known and may be cited as the Three Feet for Safety Act. (b) The driver of a motor vehicle overtaking and passing a bicycle that is proceeding in the same direction on a highway shall pass in compliance with the requirements of this article applicable to overtaking and passing a vehicle, and shall do so at a safe distance that does not interfere with the safe operation of the overtaken bicycle, having due regard for the size and speed of the motor vehicle and the bicycle, traffic conditions, weather, visibility, and the surface and width of the highway. (c) A driver of a motor vehicle shall not overtake or pass a bicycle proceeding in the same direction on a highway at a distance of less than three feet between any part of the motor vehicle and any part of the bicycle or its operator. (d) If the driver of a motor vehicle is unable to comply with subdivision (c), due to traffic or roadway conditions, the driver shall slow to a speed that is reasonable and prudent, and may pass only when doing so would not endanger the safety of the operator of the bicycle, taking into account the size and speed of the motor vehicle and bicycle, traffic conditions, weather, visibility, and surface and width of the highway. (e) (1) A violation of subdivision (b), (c), or (d) is an infraction punishable by a fine of thirty-five dollars ($35). (2) If a collision occurs between a motor vehicle and a bicycle causing bodily injury to the operator of the bicycle, and the driver of the motor vehicle is found to be in violation of subdivision (b), (c), or (d), a two-hundred-twenty-dollar ($220) fine shall be imposed on that driver.

(f) This section shall become operative on September 16, 2014.

=== Cyclist's Duties to Other Cyclists, Pedestrians, Runners, and Self ===
It is arguably legal for cyclists to race each other on open public roads in California if that is safe at the time under the circumstances. In traffic, or where visibility is limited (rain, fog, wooded areas, curvy roads), racing would be arguably negligent and unlawful. CVC 21200(a), provides: "Every person riding a bicycle upon a highway... is subject to all the provisions applicable to the driver of a vehicle by this division... except those provisions which by their very nature can have no application." Under the common law in California, all vehicle operators (including bike operators) have a general duty to use reasonable care to avoid collisions with other cyclists, cars, runners and pedestrians, since it is not the case that runners and pedestrians (for example) are always prohibited by the CVC from sharing a bike lane.

== Miscellaneous ==
=== Equipment requirements ===
A bicycle ridden on public roads must have a brake on at least one wheel which can make the wheel skid on dry pavement.

CVC 21201 (d) A bicycle operated during darkness upon a highway, a sidewalk where bicycle operation is not prohibited by the local jurisdiction, or a bikeway... shall be equipped with all of the following

- A white front lamp (either attached to the bike or to the rider) which can be seen from 300 feet (91 m) away.
- A red rear safety reflector visible from 500 feet (150 m) away when illuminated by automobile headlights.
- White or yellow reflectors visible from on the bike's pedals or the cyclist's feet or ankles.
- A white or yellow reflector on each side of the bike's front half.
- A white or red reflector on each side of the bike's back half.

=== Bicycle helmets for minors ===
CVC 21212 requires cyclists under the age of 18 to wear helmets. The charge can be dismissed if the person charged declares under oath that it is their first violation of this section. Otherwise, the infraction is punishable by a fine not more than $25. Parents will be held liable for the fine.

Youth Bicycle Helmets: Minors

21212 (a) A person under 17 years of age shall not operate a bicycle, a nonmotorized scooter, or a skateboard, nor shall they wear in-line or roller skates, nor ride upon a bicycle, a nonmotorized scooter, or a skateboard as a passenger, upon a street, bikeway, as defined in Section 890.4 of the Streets and Highways Code, or any other public bicycle path or trail unless that person is wearing a properly fitted and fastened bicycle helmet that meets the standards of either the American Society for Testing and Materials (ASTM) or the United States Consumer Product Safety Commission (CPSC), or standards subsequently established by those entities.

— California Department of Motor Vehicles, CVC 21212, Youth Bicycle Helmets Minors

Under CVC 21100(a) local authorities may adopt ordinances for the purpose of "Regulating or prohibiting processions or assemblages on the highways."

=== Riding under the influence ===
CVC 21200.5 prohibits riding a bicycle while under the influence of alcohol and/or drugs.

=== Possibility of licensing ===
CVC 39002 abrogates the power of local authorities to prohibit riding of unlicensed bicycles. (Note: For example, Article 6275-1 of the Ventura County Code of Ordinances states that "No resident of the unincorporated area of the County of Ventura shall operate any bicycle on any street, road, highway, or other public property within the unincorporated area of this County unless such bicycle is licensed in accordance with this Ordinance and Division 16.7 of the California Vehicle Code.")

39002. (a) A city or county, which adopts a bicycle licensing ordinance or resolution, shall not prohibit the operation of an unlicensed bicycle.

(b) It is unlawful for any person to tamper with, destroy, mutilate, or alter any license indicia or registration form, or to remove, alter, or mutilate the serial number, or the identifying marks of a licensing agency's identifying symbol, on any bicycle frame licensed under this division.

— California Department of Motor Vehicles, CVC 39002, Registration and Licensing of Bicycles

== See also ==
- Law of California
- Outline of cycling
