= California Vehicle Code =

Legal statute for California, US

The California Vehicle Code, informally referred to as the Veh. Code or the CVC, is a legal code which contains almost all statutes relating to the operation, ownership and registration of vehicles (including bicycles and even animals when riding on a public roadway) in the state of California in the United States. It is one of the 29 California Codes enacted by the California State Legislature.

The Vehicle Code's "Rules of the Road" generally apply to operating vehicles, bicycles, and animals on a public roadway, except for provisions which by their very nature can have no application. The Vehicle Code also contains statutes concerning the California Department of Motor Vehicles and the California Highway Patrol.

The Vehicle Code includes various topics from defining the size of license plates to criminal law sections relating to the theft and misuse of motor vehicles. The Vehicle Code is one of 29 codes containing general statutes adopted by the California legislature and that have either been signed into law by the governor or that have become law without the governor's signature.

== History ==
The Motor Vehicle Act of 1913 made driver's licenses mandatory for all motor vehicle operators in California as of December 31, 1913. That law as well as the Vehicle Acts of 1915 and 1923 were codified into the first version of the Vehicle Code in 1935. In 1959, the California State Legislature recodified the Vehicle Code (meaning that it was reorganized for clarity and numerous sections were renumbered). Among other things, the code specifies weight and height restrictions for vehicles in certain zones, such as on freeways.

== See also ==
- Bicycle law in California
- Law of California
