= Grand Rapids Cycle Company Factory =

- Formerly listed on the U.S. National Register of Historic Places
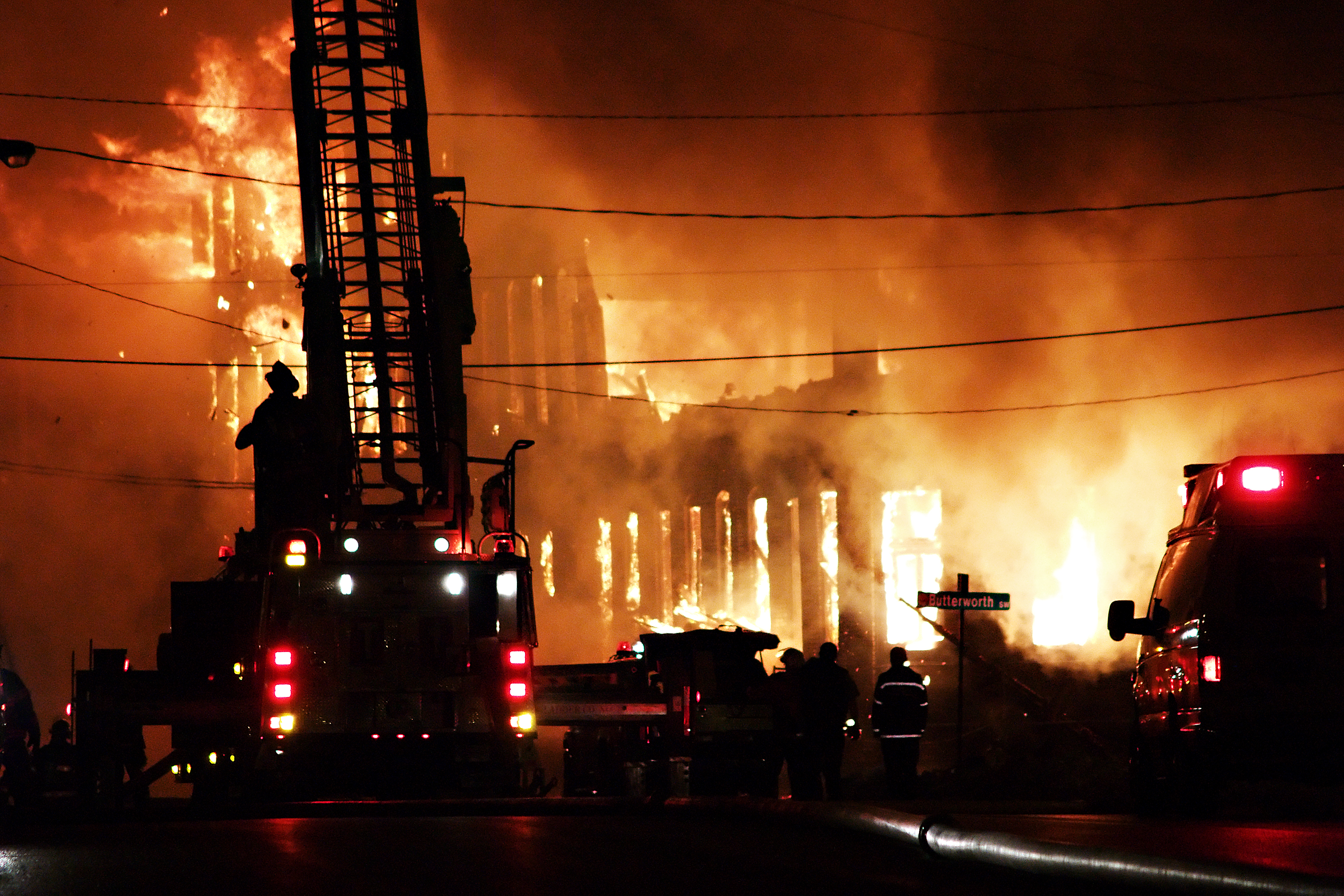
- Factory fire, February 2007

- Location within Michigan Location within the United States
- Interactive map showing building location
- Location: 514 Butterworth St. SW, Grand Rapids, Michigan
- Coordinates: 42°57′35″N 85°40′53″W
- Area: 0.5 acres (0.20 ha)
- Built: 1895
- Architectural style: Late Victorian
- Demolished: 2007
- NRHP reference No.: 04000600

Significant dates
- Added to NRHP: June 16, 2004
- Removed from NRHP: September 1, 2022

Grand Rapids Cycle Company Factory was a historic manufacturing plant located at 514 Butterworth Street SW in Grand Rapids, Michigan. It was listed on the National Register of Historic Places in 2004. In 2007 the building was destroyed by fire.

== History ==
For a short period, from about 1890 to 1903, Grand Rapids was one of the largest bicycle manufacturing cities in the nation, with up to six separate manufacturers. The first of these was the Grand Rapids Cycle Company, which was founded in about 1890 by a group of local Grand Rapids businessmen. They were in production by 1891. At the beginning, sales doubled every year, and by 1895 the company had outgrown its original factory space. Construction began on a new factory on Butterworth, and the company quickly moved production to the new location. However, in 1897, sales began declining as the market was satiated, and in 1899 the company was absorbed into the American Bicycle Company along with 35 other companies. However, bicycle production ceased in Grand Rapids in 1900, and American itself went bankrupt in 1903.

In 1902, the C. S. Paine Company, Ltd., a manufacturer of lacquered furniture, purchased the factory building. They used the factory building until 1924, when they were absorbed into Williams-Kimp Furniture Company, a manufacturer of mahogany reproduction furniture. In 1951, the Baker Furniture Company purchased Williams-Kimp and furniture manufacture at the plant ceased. Beginning in 1952, the American Seating Company used the building as a warehouse. They ceased in 1957 and in the mid-1960s the building was briefly occupied by the Star Mist Foam Rubber Company. Beginning in 1970, the Kent Foundry operated in the building, and continued until 1994. The building was vacant afterward.

In the early 2000s, plans were being made to renovate the factory into lofts. However, in 2007 the building was destroyed by fire. The site is now occupied by Grand Valley State University.

== Description ==
The Grand Rapids Cycle Company Factory consisted of three parts. The original two parts were constructed in 1895 as two separate buildings. The first was a two-story building at the corner of Butterworth Street and Front Avenue, with an 80-foot frontage on Butterworth Street and a 100-foot frontage on Front. The second was originally separated from the first by a ten-foot alley, and was a three-story building with a 50-foot frontage on Butterworth running 100 feet in depth. The third portion of construction was a 1912 building connected to the original along the Front Avenue facade; this structure additionally connected the previously separate 1895 buildings and filled in the alley. All three portions of the factory were constructed of cream-colored brick, with wood framed floors and flat roofs. The windows were 12/12 double-hung units, primarily in segmental arched window openings. The original office portion of the facade, located on the ground floor corner of the second building, contained semicircular arched openings.
