= Bicycle helmets in Australia =

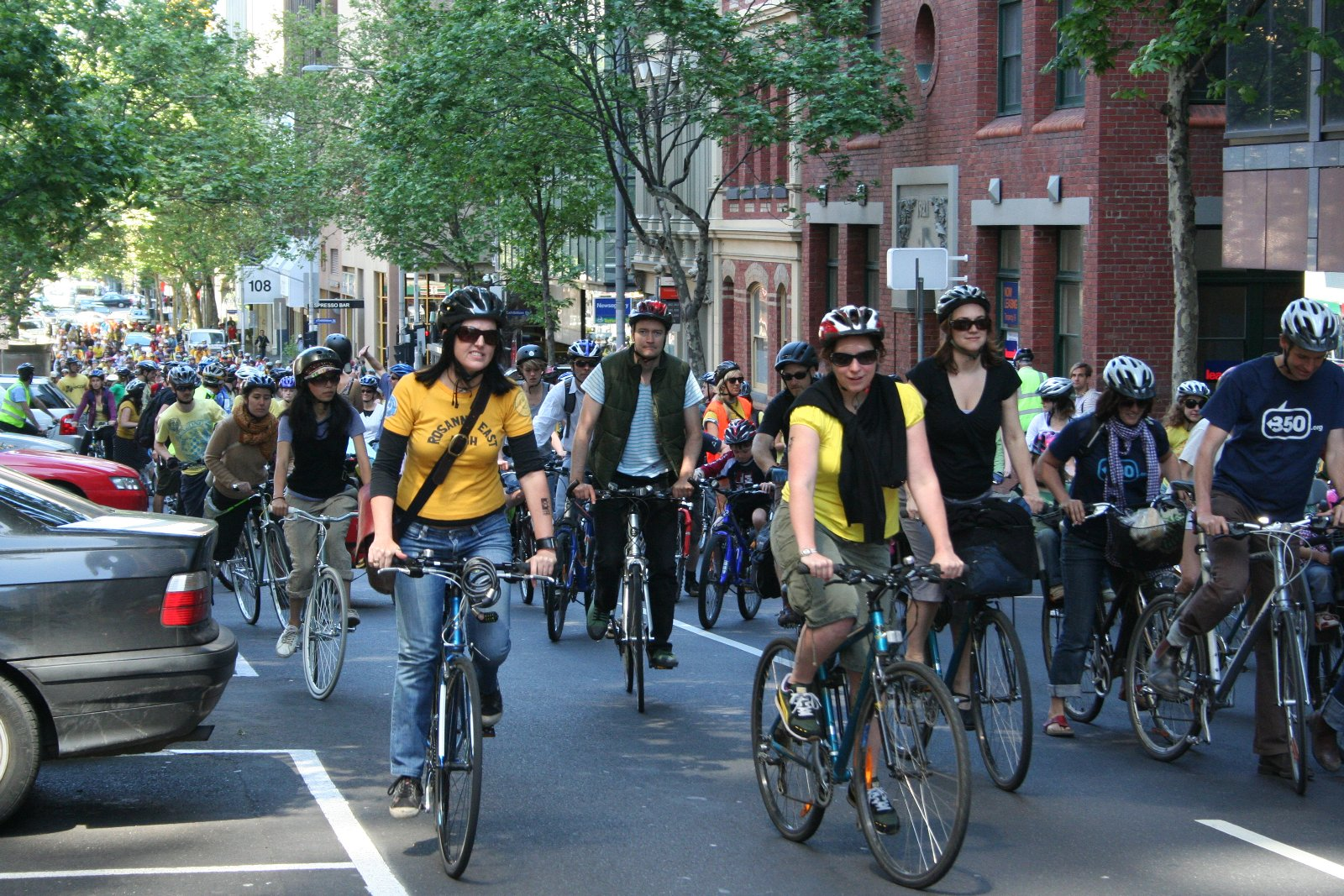
Cyclists wearing helmets on a street in Melbourne, during a climate protest event

Australia was the first country to make wearing bicycle helmets mandatory. The majority of early statistical data regarding the effectiveness of bicycle helmets originated from Australia. Their efficacy is still a matter of debate.

Between 1990 and 1992, Australian states and territories introduced various laws mandating that cyclists wear bicycle helmets while riding after a campaign by various groups including the Royal Australasian College of Surgeons (RACS).

== History: lead-up to the laws ==
Modern varieties of bicycle helmet first became commercially available from 1975. Industry helmet standards were developed from the 1970s and are still under development.

In 1985, the House of Representatives Standing Committee on Transport Safety recommended that cooperation of states and territories should be sought to "review the benefits of bicycle helmet wearing ... and unless there are persuasive arguments to the contrary introduce compulsory wearing of helmets by cyclists on roads and other public places". A federal parliament committee was set up in 1985.

A 1986 report on child cyclist injuries from Redcliffe Hospital, Brisbane, detailed 93% of cases were not life-threatening and from 18 admissions, they included nine with minor head injury for overnight observation. In 1987 a report based on Brisbane hospitals detailed a majority of children aged five to seven years were in favour of wearing helmets, whereas older children were opposed.

In 1987 the Victorian Parliamentary Road Safety Committee tabled a report in the Parliament of Victoria which included a recommendation for mandatory wearing of helmets. The terms of reference for the inquiry related to child pedestrians and child cyclists and to report on 'the use of safety helmets by child cyclists'.

By 1989, just before the government decided to introduce compulsory wearing of bicycle helmets, an officially commissioned survey showed that public support for it was 92% for children and 83% for all riders. Opposition was fragmented and ineffective; no major cycling groups opposed the law in public.

== Introduction of the laws: legal requirements ==
Rule 256 of the Australian Road Rules specifies that "the rider of a bicycle must wear an approved bicycle helmet securely fitted and fastened on the rider’s head, unless the rider is exempt from wearing a bicycle helmet under another law of this jurisdiction." The rules also require helmet use by certain bicycle passengers. As of June 2013, the legally required standard for a bicycle helmet is AS/NZS 2063.

Mandatory helmet laws were first introduced in Victoria in July 1990, followed in January 1991 by laws for adult cyclists in New South Wales and all age-groups in Tasmania. In July 1991, New South Wales extended the law to child cyclists. In the same month, laws covering all cyclists were adopted in South Australia and in Queensland, where the law was not enforced until 1 January 1993. In January 1992 helmet laws were introduced in the Northern Territory (NT) and Western Australia and in July 1992 in the Australian Capital Territory.

In the NT since March 1994 there is an exemption for adults cycling along footpaths or on cycle paths.

Four of the six states (Victoria, Queensland, Western Australia and South Australia), and the ACT, have exemptions for people who can not wear helmets for religious reasons, primarily Sikhs.

== Ongoing debate: after the laws ==
Academics within and outside Australia continue to express professional opinions both supportive and in opposition of the laws. One opposition to the legislation is centred on shared bicycles in Brisbane and Melbourne. Shared bicycles are used about one tenth as much as is typical within areas without compulsory helmet laws. Various factors may be responsible. One response has been to improve the availability of helmets to users of bicycle-sharing schemes, while Brisbane City Council has suggested trialling helmet-free zones. In 2015, the Australian Senate included the helmet issue as part of an Inquiry (Personal choice and community impacts) and received many submissions (mainly opposed to the laws) and heard from various witnesses giving evidence both for and against the helmet laws.

== Research ==
Studies of helmet use by injured cyclists were published from the late 1980s, some in Australia, both before and after helmet legislation. These have concluded both for and against the encouragement of bicycle helmet wearing and/or bicycle helmet legislation – the debate continues, without consensus.

In 2020, Transport for NSW commenced a program of observational research and helmet use among bicycle riders as a safety performance indicator.

== See also ==
- Bicycle helmet laws
- Cycling in Australia
- Bicycle helmets by country
