= Timm Peddie =

Personal information
- Born: United States

Cycling career
- Sport: Cycling

Amateur team
- 1991-1993: TCBY

Professional team
- 1994-1996: Killer Loop - Plymouth

Major wins
- 22 races across 7 countries

Timm Peddie is a retired professional track and road bicycle racer from the United States. He won the collegiate national track championships (1991) and the U.S. Olympic Road Trials (1992). He represented the United States in the Olympic Games Road Race, in Barcelona, Spain and competed from 1991 through 1996, winning over 20 professional and international races.

He was selected by his peers to the United States Olympic Committee (USOC), in 1996, where he served for four years (1996-2000). He re-ignited and led the debate on externalizing drug testing from the USOC, leading to the creation of the United States Anti-Doping Agency (USADA), which he helped found at the end of his term, in 2000.
