= Eagle Bicycle Manufacturing Company =

American bicycle manufacturer

- Industry: Manufacturing
- Founded: 1888 in Torrington, Connecticut
- Defunct: 1900
- Products: Bicycles

Eagle Plant in Torrington, Connecticut

Eagle Bicycle Manufacturing Company based in Torrington, Connecticut built bicycles from 1888-1900.

Eagle Bicycle Company Head Badge-Logo, 1896

At one time, Eagle had a capacity to manufacture 20,000 to 30,000 bicycles annually. The company promoted some of their unique features such as aluminum rims and inner tube tires, which are easily detached and repaired. They were one of the earliest to use cold-swaging on the frame joints. Eagle built high wheels including a 48", 50" and 52" inch high wheel in the 1880s. They weighed 35 to 50 pounds and cost $40 to $150.

In 1890, Frank E. Weaver made one of the first ever USA transcontinental bicycle trips (Thomas Stevens has claims to the first in 1884) on a 48" Eagle bicycle. Mr. Weaver supplied periodic reports on the New Haven to San Francisco cross-country trip to Bicycling World, LAW Bulletin and New Haven Palladium.
