= Bicycle helmets in the United States =

Bicycle helmet laws in the United States: No laws No state law but local laws exist Statewide laws requiring some minors to wear helmets; other local laws may also exist.

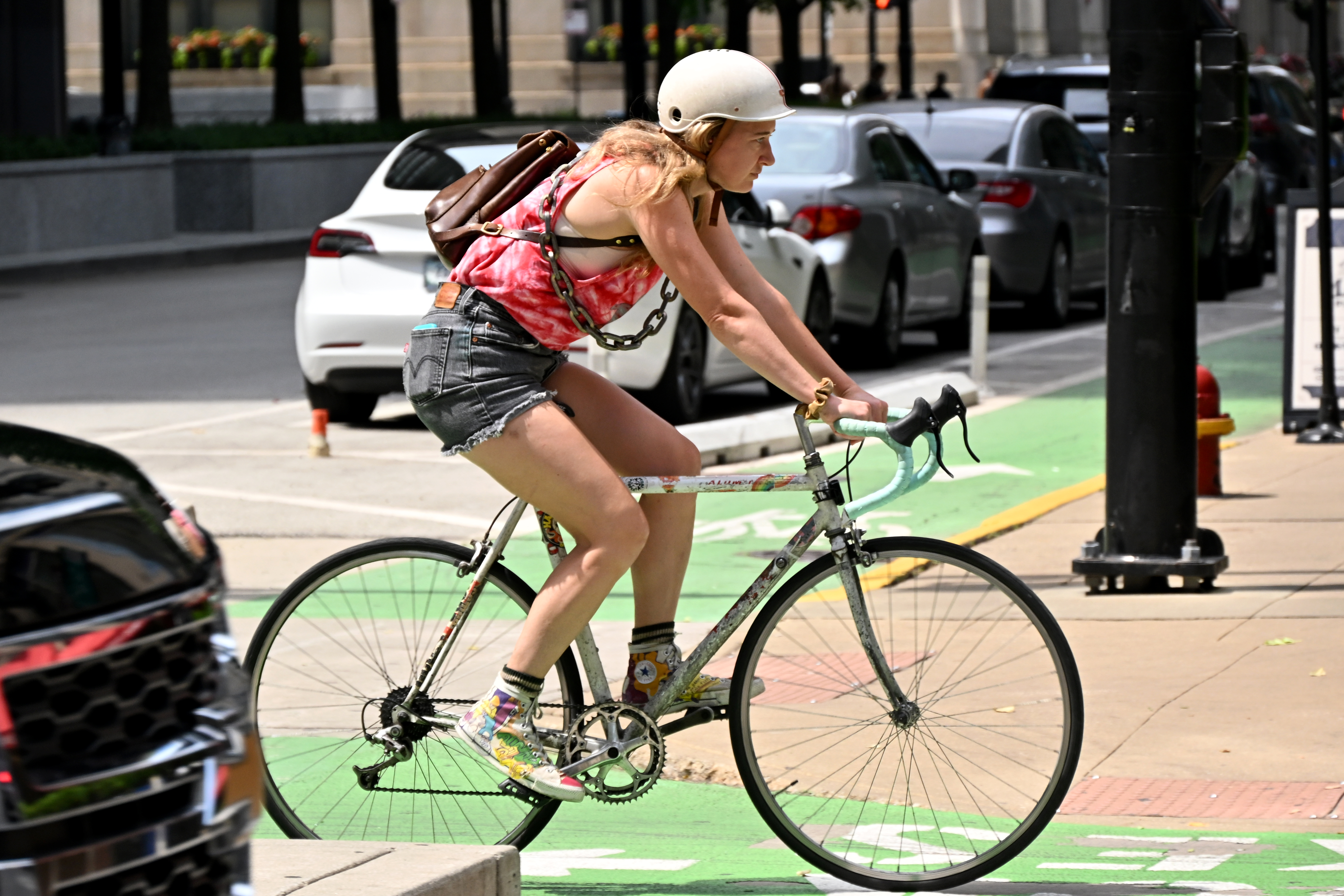
Cyclist with a bicycle helmet in Chicago in 2025.

The requirement to wear bicycle helmets in the United States varies by jurisdiction and by age of the cyclist, for example 21 states and the District of Columbia have statewide mandatory helmet laws for children. 29 US states have no statewide law, and 13 of these states have no such laws in any lower-level jurisdiction either.

== Importance ==
States began to adopt laws on wearing helmets for bicycle riding in 1987. There are a total of 22 state laws for bicycle helmets and 201 local laws. Each year about 2% of motor vehicle crash deaths are bicyclists. In a majority of bicyclist deaths, the most serious injuries are to the head. Helmet use has been estimated to reduce the odds of head injury by 50%, and the odds of head, face, or neck injury by 33%.

== Protection ==
Helmet laws reduce fatalities from bicycle accidents by about 15% in the long run. There is no evidence that shows laws requiring children to wear helmets increases adult use. Through 2000, existing helmet laws have saved 130 lives.

== Effects ==
The state of New York reported that since it had introduced its second helmet law in 1994 for riders under 14, the annual rate of cyclists hospitalized from bicycle-related traumatic brain injuries fell from 464 in 1990 to 209 in 1995. There is no way to determine exactly what proportion of the improvement was due to helmet laws, since there is no data on improvements to bicycle facility safety, rider education or total miles ridden in those years, and helmet promotion campaigns by Safe Kids Worldwide and others were active in the state.

== Helmet recalls ==
By law, all helmets sold in the U.S. must meet standards set by the Consumer Products Safety Commission (CPSC). There were two helmet recalls in the year 2000. A helmet made by Rand International of Farmingdale, NY was voluntarily recalled and involved 70,000 helmets known as "L.A. Cruisin' Bike Helmets" in child, youth and adult sizes. The CPSC's press release for the recall was, "These helmets fail impact testing and labeling required under CPSC’s Safety Standard for Bicycle Helmets violating the Consumer Product Safety Act. Riders wearing these helmets are not properly protected from falls and could suffer severe head injuries…" The other helmet was a girl's helmet with decals reading "Hearts and Flowers." It was voluntarily recalled by Cycle Express Inc., of New York, NY, who had sold about 9,000 of them. The CPSC released a similar press release statement, “These helmets fail impact testing and labeling required under CPSC’s Safety Standard for Bicycle Helmets violating the Consumer Product Safety Act. Riders wearing these helmets are not adequately protected from falls and could suffer severe head injuries or death…”

== Laws by jurisdiction ==
Laws by Jurisdiction
Jurisdiction	Ages	Effective
Alabama		
State law	Under 16	1995
Montevallo	All ages	1993
Homewood	All ages	1994
Alaska		
Anchorage	Under 16	2005
Bethel	Under 18	2004
Juneau	Under 18	2006
Kenai	Under 16	2004
Sitka	Under 18	2005
Arizona		
Flagstaff	Under 18	2010
Pima County	Under 18	1995
Sierra Vista	Under 18	1995
Tucson	Under 18	1993
Yuma	Under 18	1997
California		
State Law	Passengers under 5	1987
State Law	Riders under 18	1994
State Law	Under 18 * Scooters, skateboards, inline skates	2003
Bidwell Park, Chico for off-road in middle&upper park	All ages	1991
Connecticut		
State Law	Under 16	1993/1997
City of Seymour (Repealed 1998)	All ages	1998
Delaware		
State Law	Under 18 *	1996
District of Columbia		
District Law	Under 16 *	2000/04
Florida		
State Law	Under 16 **	1997
Georgia		
State Law	Under 16	1993
Hawaii		
State Law	Under 16	2001
Illinois		
Barrington	Under 17	1997
Chicago (messengers)	All ages	
Cicero	Under 16	1997
Inverness	Under 16	1999
Libertyville (Incentives only)		1997
Skokie	Under 16	2002
Kansas		
Lawrence	Under 16 *	2004
Kentucky		
Louisville (Parks)	Under 18 *	2002
Louisville Extreme Park	All ages	2002
Louisiana		
State Law	Under 12	2002
Maine		
State Law	Under 16	1999
Maryland		
State Law	Under 16 *	1995
Allegany County	Under 16	1992
Howard County	Under 16	1990
Montgomery County	Under 18	1991
Sykesville	All ages	1995
Massachusetts		
State Law	Passengers under 5	1990
State Law	Riders under 17 *	1994/2004
Michigan		
Adrian	Under 15	1998
E. Grand Rapids	Under 18	1995
Farmington Hills	Under 16 *	1999
Kensington Metropark	All ages	1998
Mississippi		
Hernando	Under 17 *	2010
Jackson	All ages?	2013
Ridgeland	???	2010
Starkville	All ages *	2010
Missouri		
St Louis County	1 to 16 *	Unincorp. areas 2002 Countywide 2008
St Louis County municipalities of:	- -	
Ballwin	Under 17	2006
Bel-Ridge	All ages	2002
Bella Villa	Under 17	2005
Bellefontaine Neighbors	Under 17	2005
Berkeley	All ages	2000
Black Jack	All ages	2008
Calverton Park	All ages	2001
Chesterfield	Under 17	2008
Clayton	Under 17	2005
Creve Coeur	All ages	2000
Ellisville	Under 17	2005
Florissant	Under 17	2003
Glendale	All ages	2008
Grantwood Village	All ages	2003
Hanley Hills	Under 17	2007
Hazelwood	Under 17	2007
Hillsdale		
Moline Acres	Under 17	2008
Normandy	Under 17	2004
Northwoods	Under 17	2003
Norwood Court	Under 17	2004
Olivette	Under 17*	2005
Overland	Under 17	2005
Pagedale	All ages	2002
Riverview	Under 17	2008
Rock Hill	Under 17	2003
St. John	Under 17	2001
Sycamore Hills	All ages	2008
Town & Country	All ages	2002
Velda City	All ages	2006
Velda Village Hills	All ages	2005
Vinita Terrace	Under 21	2001
Webster Groves	Under 17	2004
Wellston		
Wilber Park	Under 17	2005
Wildwood	Under 17	2005
St Louis Co Parks	Under 17	2001
- -	- -	- -
Municipalities inother counties		
Columbia	Under 16 *	2003
St Charles	Under 16	2006
Montana		
Billings	Under 16	2001
Nevada		
Duckwater Indian Reservation	Under 17	2001
Reno/Sparks Indian Colony	Under 17	2002
New Hampshire		
State Law	Under 16	2006
New Jersey		
State Law	Under 17 *	1992/05
New Mexico		
State Law	Under 18 *	2007
Los Alamos County	Under 18	1995
New York		
State Law	Passengers under 5	1989
State Law	Riders under 14*	1994/2004
Eastchester	Under 19 *	2004
Erie County Parks	All ages	1993
Greenburgh	All ages	1994
Guilderland	Under 14	1992
Onondaga County-Syracuse	Under 18	2001
Rockland County	All ages	1992
Suffolk County	14 to 17	2000
North Carolina		
State Law	Under 16	2001
Black Mountain	All ages	1996
Boone	All ages	1995
Carolina Beach	Under 16	1994
Carrboro	Under 16	1997
Cary	Under 16	2001
Chapel Hill	Under 16	1992
Charlotte	Under 16 *	2002
Cornelius	Under 16 *	2001
Greenville	Under 16	1998
Matthews	Under 16	2001
Ohio		
Akron	Under 16	2001
Beachwood	Under 16	1990
Bexley	Under 16	2010
Blue Ash	Under 16	2003
Brecksville	Under 18 *	1998
Brooklyn	Under 14	2001
Centerville	Under 18	1999
Cincinnati	Under 16 *	2004
Columbus	Ages 1–17 *	2009
Dayton	Under 13	2004
East Cleveland	Under 18 *	2004
Enon	Under 16 *	2004
Euclid	Under 14	2001
Glendale	Under 19 *	2000
Kettering	Under 16 *	2004
Lakewood	Under 18	1997
Madeira	Under 17 *	2002
Marietta	Under 16 *	2004
Orange Village	Ages 6 to 15	1992
Pepper Pike	Under 18	2000
Shaker Heights	All ages over 5 inc. passengers	1997
South Euclid	Under 14	2000
Strongsville	Under 12	1993
Waynesville	Under 17 *	2000
Oklahoma		
Norman	Under 18	2003
Oklahoma City (city property)	All ages	1999
Oregon		
State Law	Under 16 *	1994
Pennsylvania		
State Law	Riders under 12	1995
Rhode Island		
State Law	Under 16 *	1996/ 1998/ 2007
Tennessee		
State Law	Under 16	1994/2000
Clarksville	Under 16	1993
Texas		
Arlington	Under 18	1997
Austin	Under 18	1996/97
Bedford	Under 16	1996
Benbrook	Under 17	1996
Coppell	Under 15	1997
Dallas	Under 18	1996/2014
Fort Worth	Under 18	1996
Houston	Under 18	1995
Southlake	Under 15	1999
Virginia ****		
Albemarle County	Under 15	
Alexandria	Under 15	1994
Amherst County	Under 15	1993
Arlington County	Under 15	1993
Blacksburg	Under 15	1994
Clarke County	Under 15	
Fairfax County	Under 15	1993
Fairfax City	Under 15	2016
Falls Church	Under 15	1993
Floyd County	Under 15	
Front Royal	Under 15	1996
Hampton	Under 15	1999
Harrisonburg	Under 15	
James City County	Under 15	1999
Luray	Under 15	
Manassas	Under 15	1995
Manassas Park	Under 15	1997
Newport News	Under 15	1997
Norfolk	Under 15	2001
Orange County	Under 15	
Petersburg	Under 15	2000
Prince William Co.	Under 15	1995
Radford	Under 15	2000
Roanoke	Under 15	2000
Salem	Under 15	2000
Stafford County	Under 15	
Vienna	Under 15	
Virginia Beach	Under 15	1995
Williamsburg	Under 15	2001
Wise	Under 15	
York County	Under 15	1994
Washington State		
Aberdeen	All ages	2001
Auburn	All ages	2005
Bainbridge Island	All ages	2001
Bellevue	All ages	2002
Bremerton	All ages	2000
Des Moines	All ages	1993
DuPont	All ages	
Duvall	All ages	1993
Eatonville	All ages	1996
Enumclaw	All ages	1993
Fircrest	All ages	1995
Gig Harbor	All ages	1996
Hunts Point	All ages	1993
Island County (Recommendation only.)	All ages	1997
Kent	All ages	1999
King County Repealed in 2022	All ages	1993
Lakewood	All ages	1996
Milton	All ages *	1997
Orting	Under 17	1997
Pierce County	All ages	1994
Port Angeles	All ages	1994
Port Orchard	All ages	2004
Poulsbo	Under 18	1995
Puyallup	All ages	1994
Renton	All ages	1999
Seatac	All ages over 1 yr	1999
Seattle	All ages	2003
Snohomish repealed	All ages	2002
Snohomish skate park only	All ages	2002
Snoqualmie	All ages	1996
Spokane	All ages *	2004
Steilacoom	All ages	1995
Tacoma Repealed in 2020	All ages *	1994
University Place	All ages	1996
Vancouver	All ages	2008
West Virginia		
State Law	Under 15	1996
Clarksburg	Under 18	1993
Morgantown	All ages	1993
South Charleston	Under 18	1994
St. Albans	Under 18	1995
Wisconsin		
Port Washington	Under 17	1997

== See also ==
- Bicycle law in the United States
- Bicycle helmet laws
- Bicycle helmet laws by country
