= Bicycle helmet laws =

Laws mandating helmet use by cyclists

No legal restrictions Some local laws apply Children only Partial rules apply Mandatory but no fines apply Mandatory

Some countries and lower jurisdictions have enacted laws or regulations which require cyclists to wear a helmet in certain circumstances, typically when riding on the road or a road-related area (such as a bicycle lane or path). In some places this requirement applies only to children under a certain age, while in others it applies to cyclists of all ages.

Research indicates that bicycle helmet laws reduce bicycle fatalities and injuries. Large increases in the rate of helmet wearing usually take place after helmet laws are passed. Evidence is mixed as to whether the helmet laws lead to less cycling.

== Background ==
Modern varieties of bicycle helmet first became commercially successful from 1975. Industry helmet standards were developed from the 1970s and are still under development. Even before then, there had been calls for riders to wear helmets, based on the assumptions of high risk to cyclists and effectiveness of helmets in preventing serious injury.

The Royal Australasian College of Surgeons campaigned actively to raise public awareness, acceptance and demand, and helmets first became compulsory across Australia from 1990 to 1992. In New Zealand, Rebecca Oaten was a prominent champion; after a disastrous head injury to her son in 1986 she traveled the country to push the importance of wearing helmets. For six years she visited an average of four schools a day. Bicycle helmets became compulsory in New Zealand in January 1994. A report from the Australian Department of Transport in 1987 cast doubt on the effectiveness of helmets in real accidents. In 2004 members of the UK Parliament questioned the claims made for helmets in an Early Day Motion.

By 1991, after widespread well-resourced campaigns, the use of helmets had attained near-universal support in the United States, becoming what the League of American Wheelmen characterized as a "Mom and apple pie" issue. Some official and professional bodies in the English-speaking world now support compulsory use of helmets. A 2009 poll of U.S. adults found that 86% supported helmet laws for children. Support has spread elsewhere; Safe Kids Worldwide, which has received financial support from equipment suppliers including helmet manufacturer Bell Sports, was founded in 1987 and is currently active in a total of 17 countries. Australia, Canada, the Czech Republic, Finland, Iceland, New Zealand, Sweden, and the United States have bicycle helmet laws, in at least one jurisdiction, either for minors only, or for all riders. Spain requires helmets to be worn while cycling along public roads outside population centers, except for riders with a medical exemption or on extremely hot days.

Helmet laws are not universal in the United States; most U.S. states and municipalities have no laws or regulations regarding helmet use. In the U.S.A. 21 states and the District of Columbia have statewide mandatory helmet laws for children. 29 U.S. states have no statewide law, and 13 of these states have no such laws in any lower-level jurisdiction either. The territory of Guam made helmets compulsory for all bicycle riders and passengers on 27 February 2012.

Israel's helmet law was never enforced or obeyed. A long and sophisticated volunteer campaign led to the revocation of the adult element, in order to allow bike-hiring schemes to work. An official predicted that this would have disastrous health consequences. Mexico City has repealed its helmet law to allow a bike-sharing scheme to work.

=== Effects of general helmet use on head injury ===
Head injury can result in death or disastrous long-term physical and mental disability. Such injuries have happened to cyclists, and such cases have given powerful stimulus to political activity. A helmet testing specialist stated that some of these accidents can generate energy levels beyond those used when certifying competition motor racing helmets. One study which examined post-mortem examinations of the twenty cyclist fatalities in Auckland, New Zealand between 1974 and 1984 found that sixteen died of fatal injury to multiple organ systems, including fourteen with fatal brain injuries; four died solely of brain trauma.

Cases of head injury report a lower rate of helmet-wearing than controls who have injured other parts of the body. This has been taken as strong evidence that cycle helmets are beneficial in a crash. The most widely quoted case-control study, by Thompson, Rivara, and Thompson, reported an 85% reduction in the risk of head injury by using a helmet, though there are many criticisms of this study.

== Reactions ==
The mandatory wearing of helmets is frequently supported by medical organizations and by bodies responsible for road safety, while cycling organizations generally oppose laws mandating the wearing of helmets.

== Effects ==
=== Effects on head injuries among cyclists ===
A 2018 meta-analysis of 21 studies on the effects of bicycle helmet legislation found that mandatory bicycle helmet legislation reduced total head injuries by 20%, and serious head injuries by 55%. A 2017 systemic review and meta-analysis concluded that helmet use was association with reductions in head injuries at all levels of severity. Cochrane reviews in 2011 and 2008 concluded that "helmet legislation appears to be effective in increasing helmet use" and decreasing head injury rates, though the latter noted that very few high-quality studies existed at the time.

A 2019 study found that bicycle helmet laws in Australia led to a substantial decline in bicycle-related fatalities.

A 2006 BMJ study found that enforced helmet laws did not lead to a reduction in head injuries. This study was the subject of vigorous debate.

Changes in head injury with the New Zealand bicycle helmet law

The most studied laws are in New Zealand and Australia. A study conducted by the University of New South Wales in 2011 concluded that Mandatory Helmet Laws led to a 29% reduction in cycling-related head injuries. A 2002 study of the New Zealand law found that the law had net positive effects on minors, but that the costs outweighed the benefits for adults.

In North Carolina, where bicycle helmets are compulsory for children, the North Carolina Department of Transportation publish a fact sheet stating that helmets reduce the risk of head injury by as much as 85% and the risk of brain injury by as much as 88%.

=== Effects on other injuries among cyclists ===
A 2019 systematic review found no evidence in most of the research literature that bicycle helmets led to more risky behavior by bicyclists.

Civil Liberties Australia published an article that described a reduction in cyclist safety by about 50% following the law.

=== Effects on the amount of cycling ===
A 2018 meta-analysis concluded that the evidence was mixed as to whether bicycle helmet laws reduced cycling.

Regular moderate cycling is extremely beneficial for health, thus if mandatory helmet use deters cycling, the health impact could be unintentionally adverse. A 2018 study found "that "all-age" bicycle helmet laws significantly increased both adult and youth helmet use by 50%–190% relative to pre-reform levels, with larger effects for younger adults and less-educated adults. All-age helmet laws had modest effects at reducing cycling and increasing in-home exercise during winter months among adults but did not meaningfully affect weight. Overall, our findings confirm that all-age helmet laws can be effective at increasing population helmet use without significant unintended adverse health consequences."

A 2006 BMJ study showed that in states which had helmet laws, the amount of cycling to work had reduced by about one third. Other evidence strongly suggests that promotion or compulsion of helmet use deters cycling. It has been suggested that this is irrelevant to health as "any cyclist who wants to exercise but hates helmets enough to quit cycling if a law is passed can turn to a multitude of other activities to stay active". However, relatively few people who bicycle as part of their daily routine, would increase gym visits or take up other exercise activities if, as a result of a mandatory bicycle helmet law, they were discouraged from cycling. For many people, exercise is only sustainable if it is integrated into daily routine such as shopping errands or traveling to and from work. Helmet laws seem to offer net health benefit only in dangerous bicycling environments under optimistic assumptions of the efficacy of helmets.

A 1993 study by Monash University found that the legislation caused a 36% immediate decline in the numbers of cyclists between 1990 and 1991, that became a decline of 21% in the following year, when compared with the 1990 figures.

A 2011 review commissioned by the Queensland Government found little evidence to support the claim that mandatory helmet usage discouraged bike riding. However, the helmet laws are frequently suggested as the main cause of the disappointingly low usage of the bicycle-sharing systems in Melbourne and in Brisbane. In a 2012 study, 61% of the respondents identified helmet issues as the main reason preventing them from using the bike sharing system in Brisbane, most of this was the lack of helmet availability, the study revealed a dramatic increase in usage after the council made helmets available with the bicycles.

=== Effects on the rate of helmet wearing ===
Large increases in the rate of helmet wearing are usual after helmet laws. Not all laws have increased helmet use, no such increase was noted among the children covered by the North Carolina bicycle helmet law. In another area, an early rise in helmet use was followed by a fall to below pre-law levels. Attitudes to cycling, and the amount of enforcement effort, may both be relevant. A qualitative systematic review found that perceptions on helmet design, its quality and cost, perceived risk and benefits, parental strategies and adoption and enforcement of laws influencing helmet use.

== See also ==
- Bicycle helmet laws by country
- Bicycle helmets in the United States
- Bicycle helmets in New Zealand
- Bicycle helmets in Australia
