= The Road Rights and Liabilities of Wheelmen =

1895 work by George B. Clementson

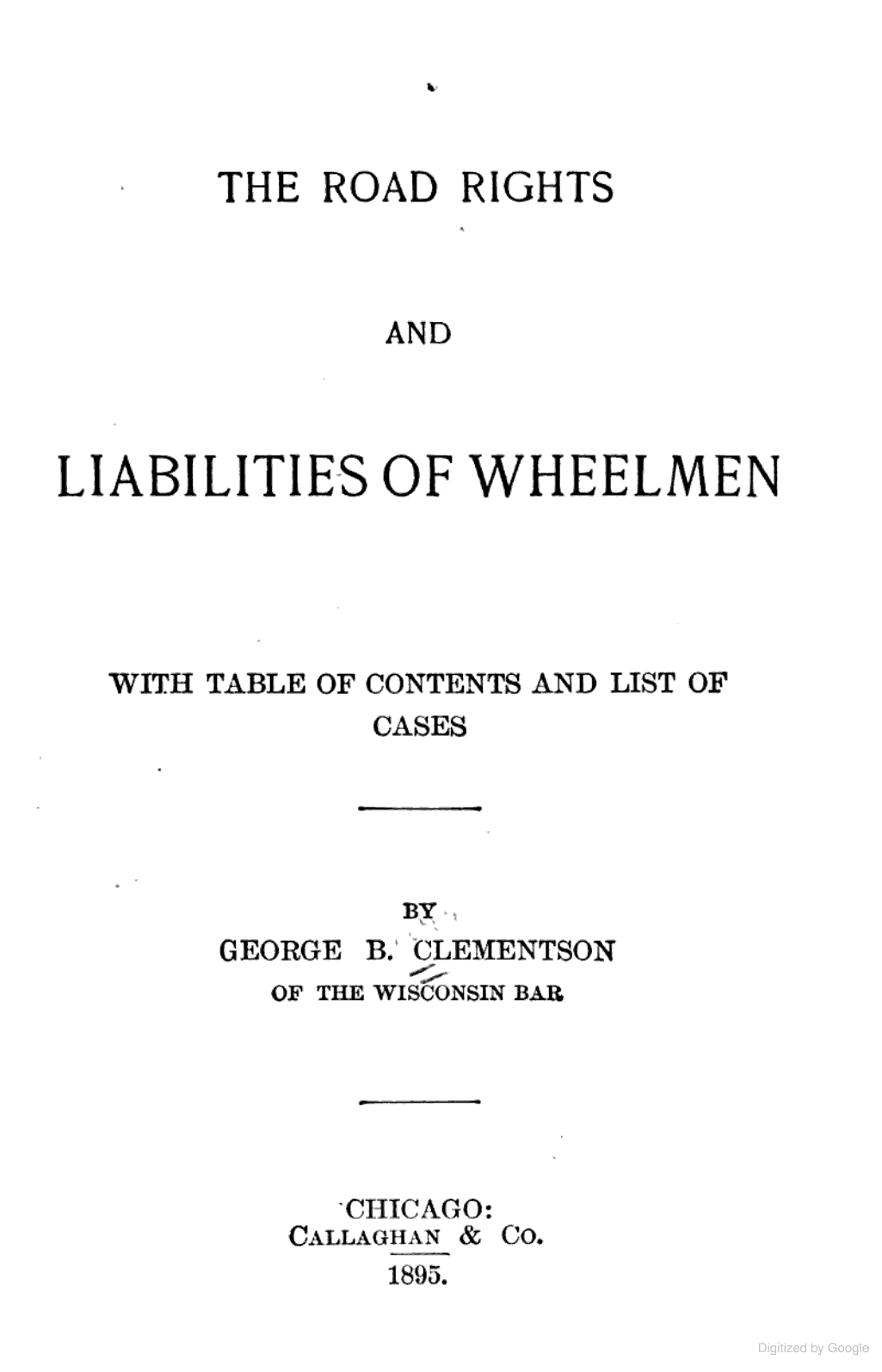
- Title page of the original edition
- Author: George B. Clementson
- Language: English
- Subject: Bicycle law
- Publication date: 1895
- Publication place: United States

The Road Rights and Liabilities of Wheelmen written by George B. Clementson at the height of the bicycle's golden age, in 1895, was the first treatise on bicycle law. In the 1880s and 1890s, the prevailing legal issue cyclists (or wheelmen as they were then called) faced was the question of the right to the road. In a series of seminal right to the road cases, cyclists gained legal rights that form the basis of cyclist's legal rights today. Although bicycle law in the United States has developed substantially since 1895, The Road Rights and Liabilities of Wheelmen continues to serve as an outstanding resource for those early right to the road cases.
