= George B. Clementson =

American attorney and author

George Burr Clementson (June 9, 1871 – May 20, 1949) an American attorney and author of The Road Rights and Liabilities of Wheelmen. Published in 1895, The Road Rights and Liabilities of Wheelmen was the first treatise to address the legal rights and duties of cyclists; thus, Clementson was the first attorney to develop bicycle law as an area of practice within the law.

George B. Clementson was the first child of George Clementson, a Lancaster, Wisconsin attorney, later elected Judge, and Mary Asenath Burr, a distant relative of Aaron Burr. An 1892 graduate of Cornell Law School, George B. Clementson married Katharine F. Barber on October 23, 1906. Following in the footsteps of his father, he also established his law firm, Lowry & Clementson, in Lancaster, Wisconsin. His son George Barber Clementson (1907–1962) was the editor of the magazine Science Digest.

While serving as district attorney, Clementson was suspended by Governor John J. Blaine for failure to act in an assault case involving the Ku Klux Klan in a parade in Boscobel, Wisconsin. The charge against Clementson was later dismissed.
