= Columbia Manufacturing Inc. =

American furniture manufacturer

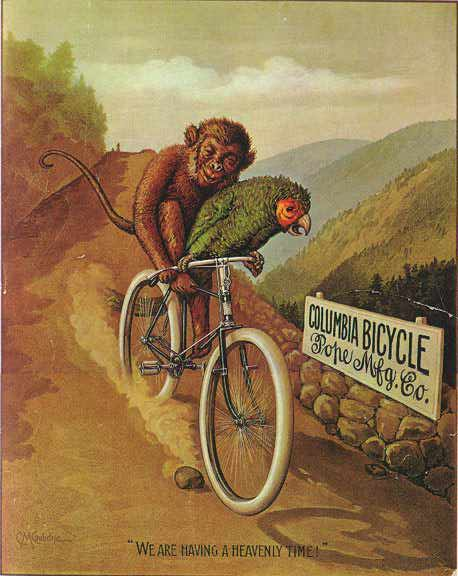
- An 1895 ad for Columbia Bicycle
- Type: Privately-held company
- Industry: Furniture
- Founded: 1877; 149 years ago
- Headquarters: Westfield, Massachusetts, United States
- Products: Chairs, desks (currently); Bicycles (formerly)
- Website: www.columbiamfginc.com

Columbia Manufacturing Inc. is a company located in Westfield, Massachusetts that manufactures chairs, desks, and other materials. In the education industry, it is best known for making the desk chair Model 114, which is used across the United States. Founded in 1877, it was once owned by Pope Manufacturing Company and was the brand that manufactured bicycles for the company. After Pope filed for bankruptcy in 1915, Columbia continued on to manufacture bicycles in Westfield. As of the 2010s, Columbia-branded bicycles are marketed by Columbia Bicycles, a subsidiary of Ballard Pacific.
