= Bicycle law =

Laws pertaining to the use and ownership of bicycles

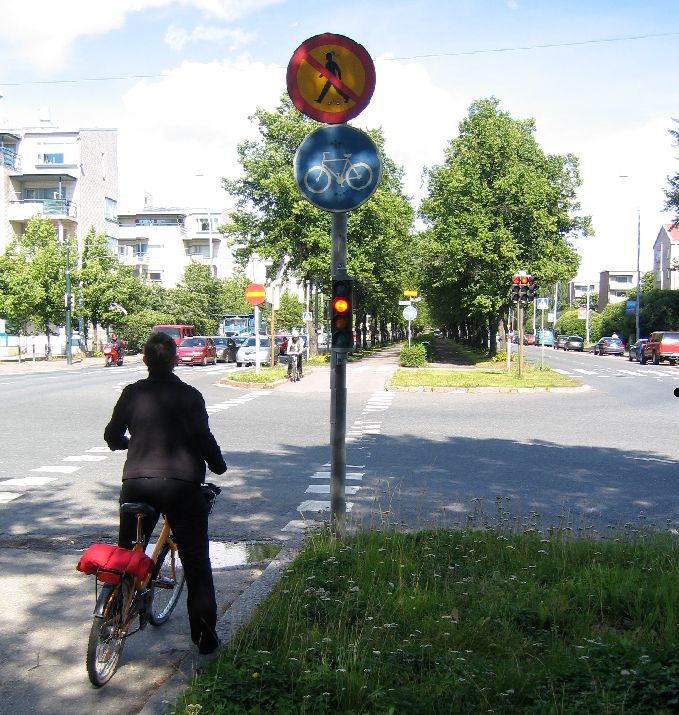
A bicyclist waits at a bicycle traffic signal in Helsinki.

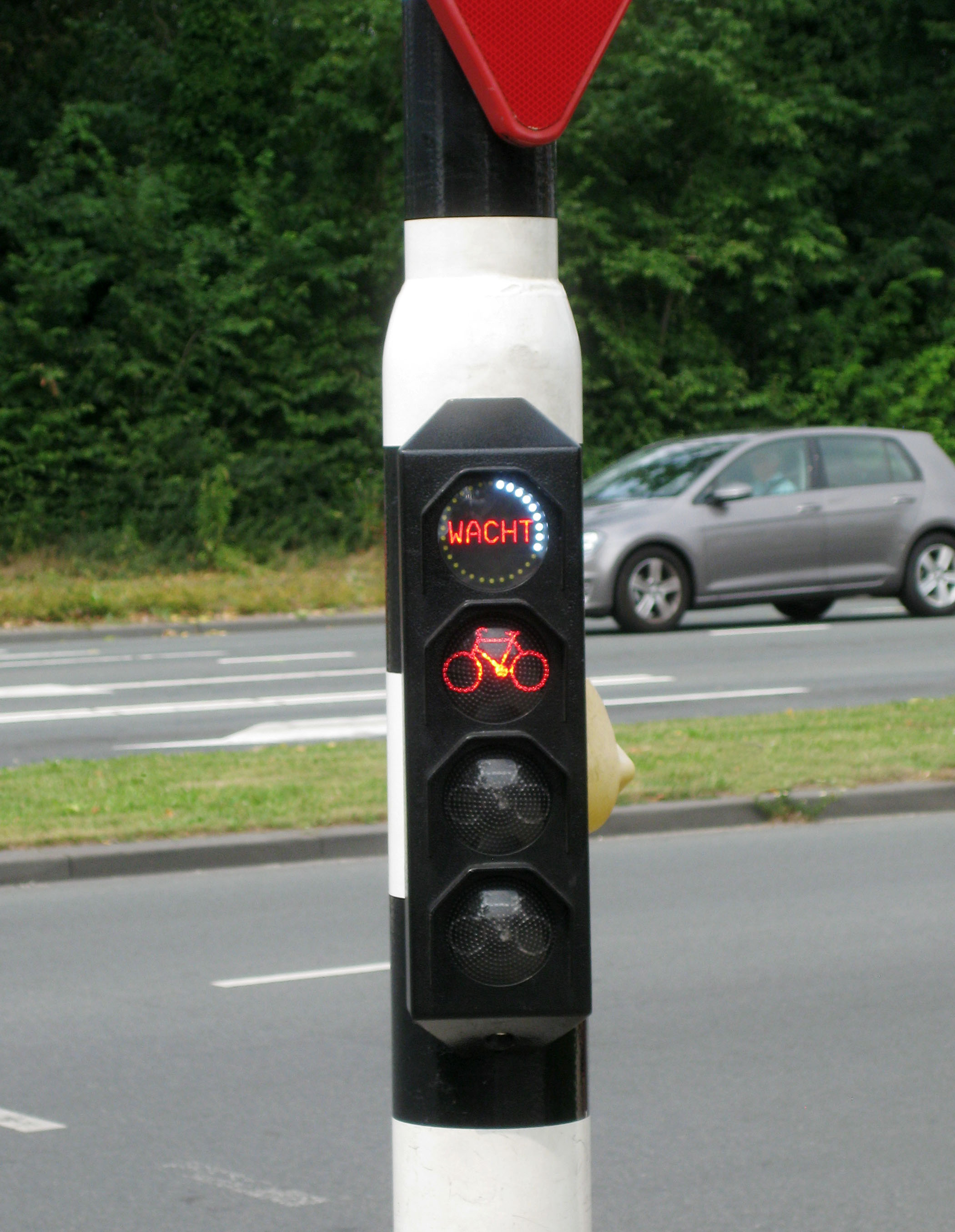
Cycling signal in Rotterdam

Bicycle law is the parts of law that apply to the riding of bicycles.

Bicycle law varies from country to country, but in general, cyclists' right to the road has been enshrined in international law since 1968, with the accession of the Vienna Convention on Road Traffic. Under that treaty, bicycles have the legal status of vehicles, and cyclists enjoy the legal status of vehicle operators. There are over 150 contracting parties to the treaty, including the United States, Canada, Mexico, almost all of Europe, Australia, New Zealand, Japan, and China. In countries that are contracting parties, the treaty has the force of law, and its provisions have been incorporated into national law.

The position of British cyclists was first established by the Local Government Act in August, 1888. It removed the right of local councils to treat cyclists among the "nuisances" it could ban and defined them as "carriages"."

== Bikeways ==
One of the potential pitfalls for observers trying to interpret the operation of bikeways (or segregated cycle facilities) is that the same legal assumptions do not apply in all environments. For instance, in contrast to most English speaking countries, some European countries, including Germany, France, Denmark, Belgium, and the Netherlands have defined liability legislation. Thus there is a legal assumption that motorists are automatically considered liable in law for any injuries that occur if they collide with a cyclist. This may hold regardless of any fault on the part of the cyclist and may significantly affect the behaviour of motorists when they encounter cyclists.

Cyclists in some countries are also given separate rules and light phases at traffic signals and cyclist-specific traffic lights. For instance, in Germany and elsewhere at junctions with segregated facilities all the traffic in a given direction (motorists, pedestrians and cyclists) may get a green signal at the same time. Turning motor traffic is obliged to wait for cyclists and pedestrians to clear the junction before proceeding. In this situation all the transport modes get equal green time. In contrast, UK and Irish practice restricts pedestrians to a dedicated signal phase, separate from and usually much shorter than the green phase for motorists (e.g. 6–12 seconds, vs. signal cycle times of up to 120 seconds). If cyclists were to be segregated and treated in a similar manner this would imply a significant reduction in green time for cycle traffic at every junction. In the English city of Cambridge the use of cyclist-specific traffic signals is reported to have resulted in increased delays for cyclists, leading some to ignore the cycle-facilities and stay on the road. A similar example occurred in a Parisian bikepath scheme in 1999. Cyclists faced twice the number of traffic signals as motorised traffic and were expected to wait over one minute to get seven seconds of green time. Conversely, in Copenhagen cyclist-specific traffic signals on a major arterial bike lane have been linked to provide green waves for rush hour cycle-traffic, which time the lights so cyclists going an average speed are much more likely to encounter green lights on their trip.

=== Legal significance of on-road cycle facilities for various countries ===
| | Marked and reserved | Marked limit, but not reserved | Shared cycle facilities |
|---|---|---|---|
| Description | Motorists are typically excluded from driving or parking, and cyclists might be obligated to use if available. | Motorists allowed to drive or park, cyclists not obligated to use. | No lane marked, typically a painted symbol or sign with legal access for cyclists and motorists |
| Austria | Radfahrstreifen ("cycle lane"), continuous line, traffic sign "obligatory cycleway" | | Mehrzweckstreifen ("multi-purpose lane", similar to shoulder) |
| Belgium | fietspad (Flemish) = piste cyclable (French), no distinction from cycletrack in Belgian legal terminology, marked by dashed lines on both sides | fietssuggestiestrook= bande cyclable suggérée (suggested cycle lane), coloured ground (but never in red) with pictograms | sharrows on a shared lane |
| Canada | The use of bikelanes is not obligatory for cyclists in any Provinces. | | shared lanes, car lanes with shared lane markings ("sharrows"). |
| Czech Republic | vyhrazený (cyklistický) jízdní pruh or "reserved (cycle-) lane", limited by a continuous line, signed "cycletrack" | cyklistický jízdní pruh = "cycle lane", limited by a dashed line, simple bicycle pictograms | files of shared lane markings are called piktogramový koridor or cyklopiktokoridor, they have sharrows and no marked border |
| France | bande cyclable obligatoire ("obligatory cycle lane"), continuous line, traffic sign "obligatory cycleway". bande cyclable conseillée et réservée (recommended & reserved cycle lane), non-oblligatory, dashed line, sign "facultative cycleway", pictograms like on shared lanes | | voies partagées (shared lanes) with shared lane markings. |
| Germany | Radfahrstreifen ("cycle lane"), continuous line, traffic sign "(obligatory) cycleway" | Schutzstreifen ("protective lane"), dashed line and simple bicycle pictograms: Normally cars have to keep left, cyclists right of the border, but for certain reasons it may be traversed, mutually. | The traffic laws provide shared use only in bus lanes, but do not forbid shared lane markings in ordinary lanes; simple bike pictograms |
| Italy | corsia ciclabile (cycle path) | | |
| Netherlands | fietsstrook met doorgetrokken streep, "bicycle lane with continuous line". Fietsstrook met onderbroken streep, "bicycle lane with dashed line", also obligagtory for cyclists but shared by motorists | fietssuggestiestrook ("suggested cycle lane"), no obligation nor reservation, no bicycle pictograms, red ground (and mostly a dashed line) or distinctive texture | |
| Poland | pas rowerowy | | |
| Switzerland | Radstreifen, colloquially Velostreifen (both mean "cycle lane"), limited by yellow continuous lines (only exceptional) | Radstreifen, colloquially Velostreifen (both mean "cycle lane"), limited by yellow dashed lines | rare use because disapproved by federal law |
| United Kingdom | mandatory cycle lane, reserved but not obligatory, limited by a continuous line | Advisory cycle lane, not reserved, limited by a dashed line | |
| United States | In all states the use of bikelanes is not obligatory for cyclists. | Dashed cycle lanes still only have an "experimental" status. In contrast to shared lanes, the equality of rights for cyclists here is limited to a lane-in-lane. | shared lanes, car lanes with shared lane markings ("sharrows") |

== National ==
Belgian B23 sign. Cyclists may tread a red light as a yield sign

=== Australia ===
Cyclists in every state in Australia are required to follow normal road rules, including using traffic lights correctly and observing give way and stop signs while riding on the road. Cyclists in every state must also wear helmets while in motion. All cyclists must only use the left hand lane, except in Queensland. All states require only one passenger per bicycle unless the bicycle is designed otherwise. They are required to use a bike light when riding at night in Western Australia, Tasmania, Northern Territory, South Australia and Queensland (that is not New South Wales, Victoria and the Capital Territory).

Bike users in Western Australia and Tasmania must use both hand signals, while in Victoria, Queensland and Northern Territory cyclists must signal when turning right but it is not compulsory when turning left. New South Wales cyclists over 18 must carry personal identification. Cyclist must have at least one hand on handle bars in Western Australia, Northern Territory and Queensland.

Cyclist may ride on standard footpaths in Western Australia, Northern Territory, South Australia and Australian Capital Territory. In Victoria and New South Wales cyclists can only ride on a footpath if they're under the age of 12 or supervising a child under 12, or have a disability which restrains them from being able to ride on the road. In Queensland cyclists can ride on any path as long as there isn’t a sign stating otherwise. Cyclists may ride in pairs in South Australia and the two rows must be no more than 1.5 meters apart in Western Australia and Queensland. Cyclists must ride single file in Northern Territory and Australian Capital Territory unless overtaking. Cyclists across Australia must follow the same rules as motor vehicle drivers in regards to using mobile phones and consuming alcohol.

=== Europe ===
Belgium and France allow cyclists to pass some red lights with red-as-yield signs.

Cycle tracks typically exclude all motorized vehicles for most countries. Some exceptions are made, such as in the Netherlands, for light motorbikes. Some jurisdictions require cyclists to use cycle tracks if present (obligatory cycle tracks) or allow cyclists to either use the cycle track or a parallel roadway (facilitative cycle tracks).

- In the United Kingdom, cycletracks are defined as cycleways physically separated from the carriageway. Their usage is not obligatory, I. e. cyclists may also ride on the parallel carriageway. They may not ride on the sidewalk, but pedestrians are allowed to walk on the cycletrack, if there is no sidewalk.
- In the Netherlands, most major roads have cycletracks and most cycletracks (fietspaden) exclude motorized vehicles and cyclists are required to use them if available. Light motorbikes are allowed and obliged to use some cycle tracks marked as fiets- en bromfietspaden. Non-obligatory cycletracks are rare but where they exist, they are indicated by signs using the word fietspad instead of a bicycle logo.
- In Belgium, the traffic law does not distinguish roadside cycletracks from cyclelanes on the carriageway. All roadside cycletracks exclude motorized vehicles and cyclists are obliged to use them.
- In France, cycletracks and cycle lanes exclude all motorized traffic. Until 1998 cyclists were obligated to use them if present. By law, most cycletracks ought to be facilitative ("conseillée et réservée", reserved and recommended), but most local authorities are delaying the replacement of round panels (obligatory) by rectangular ones (advisory).
- In 1997, Germany changed the law that using the road is the standard. Roadside cycletracks can only made obligatory for safety reasons and must have minimum physical standards (width, straightness). The non-obligatory ones have to be visible by design, but no panel sign existed. Since beginning of 2014, there is the possibility to signpost bidirectional non-obligatory roadside cycletracks using additional panels. There are big differences among the local applications of these laws. Extreme cases are the two cities with the highest cycling rates: in Münster, on almost all cycletracks cyclists are obligated to use them if present, in Bremen more than 75% are not. In Bremen, some cycle tracks have been displaced by traffic calming on the carriageway or by cycle lanes. Also Berlin, Cologne, Munich and Hamburg are making campaigns to convert obligatory cycletracks to facilitative ones or to displace them by cycle lanes (especially Hamburg)
- In Poland cycle tracks exclude motorized vehicles and can be marked as obligatory or facilitative cycletracks.
- In Italy, all cycle tracks exclude motorized vehicles and require cyclists to use them if present.
- In Switzerland, all cycle tracks exclude motorized vehicles and require cyclists to use them if present.
- In Austria, cycle tracks exclude motorized vehicles and since 2014 have made them optional for cyclists, with rectangular signs to differentiate from the typical round signs. A similar rectangular version was created for combined foot-and-cycleways and for cycleway and adjacent footway.

Austrian cycletrack signs:

Exclusive and obligatory cycletrack

Adjacent exclusive and obligatory cycletrack and sidewalk

Mixed and obligatory cycletrack and sidewalk

Exclusive but optional cycletrack

Adjacent exclusive but optional cycletrack and sidewalk

Mixed but optional cycletrack and sidewalk

Privileged cyclist crossing^{no}

==== Strict liability as protection ====
A number of European countries, including Austria, Denmark, France, Germany, Italy, the Netherlands and Sweden, apply a strict liability towards cyclists, protecting them. For example, in the Netherlands, the law assumes the stronger participant (e.g. a car driver) is liable in the case of an accident with a weaker participant (e.g. a cyclist) unless it can be proved that the cyclist's behavior could not have been expected.

=== United States ===
Although bicycle law is a relatively new specialty within the law, first appearing in the late 1980s, its roots date back to the 1880s and 1890s, when cyclists were using the courts to assert a legal right to use the roads. In 1895, George B. Clementson, an American attorney, wrote The Road Rights and Liabilities of Wheelmen, the first book on bicycle law, in which he discussed the seminal cases of the 1880s and 1890s, which were financed by Albert Pope of Columbia Bicycles, and through which cyclists gained the right to the road.

By the mid-1980s, a substantial body of law pertaining to bicycles had developed, and a few attorneys in the United States had begun specializing in bicycle law. Today, attorneys specializing in bicycle law represent professional athletes, as well as average cyclists, on issues ranging from professional contracts, to traffic accidents, to traffic tickets. In addition, attorneys specializing in bicycle law may advise cyclists on other legal issues, such as bicycle theft, insurance, harassment of cyclists, defective products law, and non-professional contractual issues.

=== India ===
As stated in the Motor Vehicles Act, 1988, which was amended in 2019, any vehicle whether motorised or mechanically/self-propelled, runs on the road and is considered a vehicle. The ruling implied that a bicycle is considered a vehicle in India. Based on the Motor Vehicles Act, while there are no penalties drafted against bicyclists and that they need not require license to ride, the Act does recommend that bicyclists follow the same traffic laws and obey signs, along with mandating that motor vehicles give way to bicyclists and pedestrians. Like majority of nations, bicycles are prohibited on expressways that have high speed limits, although major city roads and national highways across the country allow bicycles to ply. The non-requirement of license is also applicable to electric bicycles with power up to 250 watts or lesser and maximum speed up to 25 km/h (15.5 mph).

However, some state legislations, municipal authorities or law enforcement officials have made specific rules and imposition of penalties on bicyclists due to absence of provisions against them in the Motor Vehicles Act. While many of them have received positive feedback from transport experts as well as bicycle groups, some of the orders and rulings have been criticized for being absurd and not bicycle friendly, along with police misconduct and harassment, as law enforcement officials have seized bicycles or deflated tires as a deterrent. For instance, in 2008, the Kolkata traffic police enforced an order to prohibit bicycles on several roads stating they caused traffic congestion, which led to extreme backlash and civil suits against the department, as the order was not approved by the State Government and bicyclists were penalized (or seized) for riding on the prohibited roads. Alongside, due to rising bicyclists fatalities for not following traffic laws, the administration of Chandigarh district began to penalize bicyclists for any violations like breaking traffic lights since 2015. Beginning in November 2021, the Kolkata Police began to penalize and prosecute bicyclists found to be pedaling under influence if they failed a breathalyzer test and were found to have blood alcohol level in excess of 0.03% (30 mg per 100 ml blood) as per the limits stated in section 85 of the Motor Vehicles Act, although riders found to be pedaling drunk have been only charged with public intoxication rather than drunken riding/pedaling.

While the Motor Vehicles Act does not mandate penalties above Rs. 100 (US $1.25) due to non-requirement of licenses, there are instances where bicyclists have been penalized steeply for certain traffic violations and defying prohibitory orders. For instance, bicyclists found riding on Bandra–Worli Sea Link, the Trans Harbour Link, Eastern Freeway, the BKC-Chunabhatti flyover, and the Coastal Road have been slapped hefty penalties of Rs 1200 (US $15) or more by Mumbai traffic police, which have been noted to be extremely steep and not approved by state legislation.

Although bicycle tracks exist across various metropolitan regions and recommended but not required by authorities to use, many of them are underutilized due to poor quality, rampant encroachment, and dumping of waste. However, across regions where metro rail services exist, bicycles can be carried, subject to rules and regulations.

== See also ==
- Outline of cycling
- Bicycle helmet laws
- Electric bicycle laws
- Transport law
