= SCUL =

SCUL (formerly an acronym for Subversive Choppers Urban Legion) is a Boston-area bicycle chopper gang that builds and rides mutant bicycles, chopper bicycles, and tall bikes.

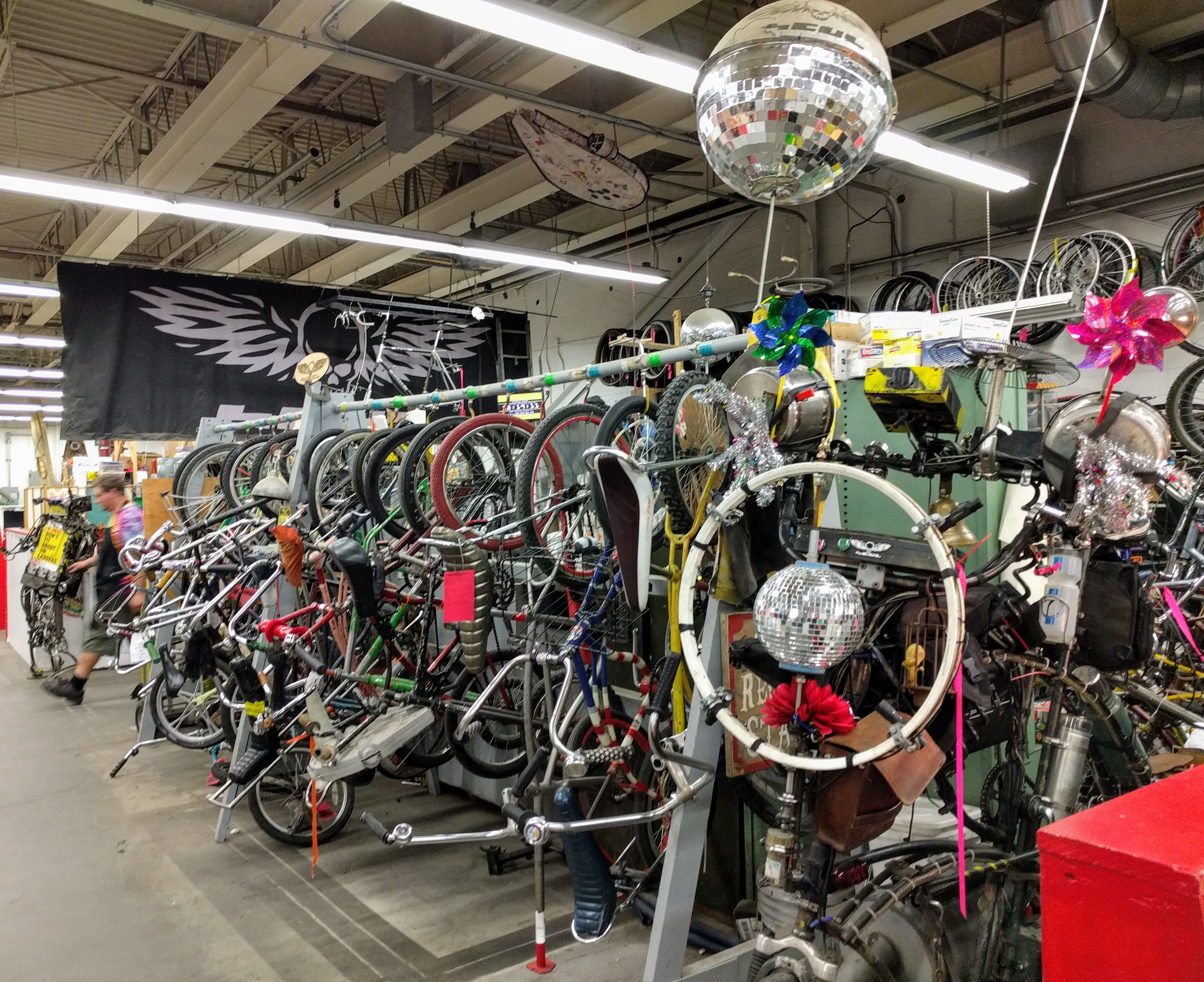
SCUL's HQ at the Artisan's Asylum in 2017

Spun off of a group called the Flying Donuts, SCUL was founded in Boston in 1995. It is organized in a paramilitary fashion with a hierarchical ranking structure, distinct naval/space terminology and a sci-fi atmosphere. Members adopt nicknames and ranks are reset each year. Advancement criteria include receiving a high five from a bystander and crushing cups.

SCUL conducts "missions" every Saturday night starting at 10:30 PM from April Fool's until Halloween. A typical mission involves routine patrolling of the local "star-systems" (cities), getting high fives from civilians they pass and crushing discarded soda cups on the street. Occasionally, they will stop to hone their "flight skills" with some friendly bicycle derby. Centuries (100-mile rides), Intergalactic and Interuniversal Missions (across state or country borders) have also been completed.

On August 25, 2005, the Coolidge Corner Theatre premiered the film SCUL: Operation SuperPosi. SCUL was featured on the PBS television show Design Squad in an episode called "Skunk'd" (named after Skunk, the founder and fleet admiral of SCUL).

SCUL is composed of four divisions, Metro Alpha Division (MAD) of Somerville, Massachusetts, the Star Chaser Division (SCD) of New Bedford, Massachusetts, the Rural Combat Division (RCD) which is based in Maine, and the Southern Beta Division (SBD) of Providence, Rhode Island. Currently the Metro Alpha Division and the Star Chaser Division are the only active divisions.

SCUL is housed by hackerspace Artisans Asylum where it maintains a bicycle repair and modification facility, and members offer classes in welding and bicycle maintenance. SCUL is loosely allied with the Rat Patrol and is similar in some ways to other bike gangs such as C.h.u.n.k. 666 and the Black Label Bike Club.
