= Cyclecide =

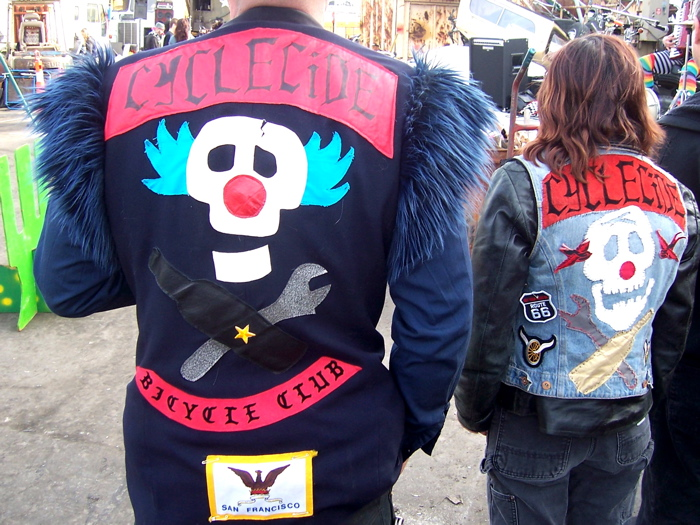
Jackets, 'colors', of two members.

Cyclecide is an American bicycle club based in San Francisco, California, composed of clowns, altered bikes, and a traveling show called "The Bike Rodeo", which is a public performance, and is different from a bicycle rodeo, a children's bicycle safety clinic.

== About ==
=== In the beginning ===
Jarico Reese and Erin Peruse organized the first Bike Rodeo on May 23, 1996, outside of Cyclone Warehouse in San Francisco. The event was a call to all local artists to build any type of bicycle attraction they could think of and bring it to the Bike Rodeo. The show was a massive success with several people flinging themselves off of a 3-foot burning bike ramp at the end of the show. This show solidified the group and they decided to host more events.

An inspiration for many bicycle gangs, including Cyclecide, is the C.h.u.n.k. 666 zine.

=== Who are they ===
"Cyclecide is a group of people in San Francisco who take junked bikes, alter them, and weld them into tall bikes, choppers, and other contraptions. Welding is fun." The group is composed of welders, musicians, seamstresses, inventors, and bicycle enthusiasts.

== Contraptions ==
A clown during a 2003 performance.

=== Bikes ===
Cyclecide takes bikes out of the junkyard and "pre-cycles" them—they turn them into art before they get recycled. Tall bikes—the symbol of the bicycle subculture—are a staple in the Cyclecide fleet. Some bikes are welded into bicycle choppers. The Suburban Intruder is a Frankenstein combination of a push mower and a bicycle: "2000 are in production to mow a strip across America", states Reese in a performance. Other bikes have names like 666 Chopper, Twelve Pack Fetch, Bone Bike, and Bumblebee.

=== Rides ===
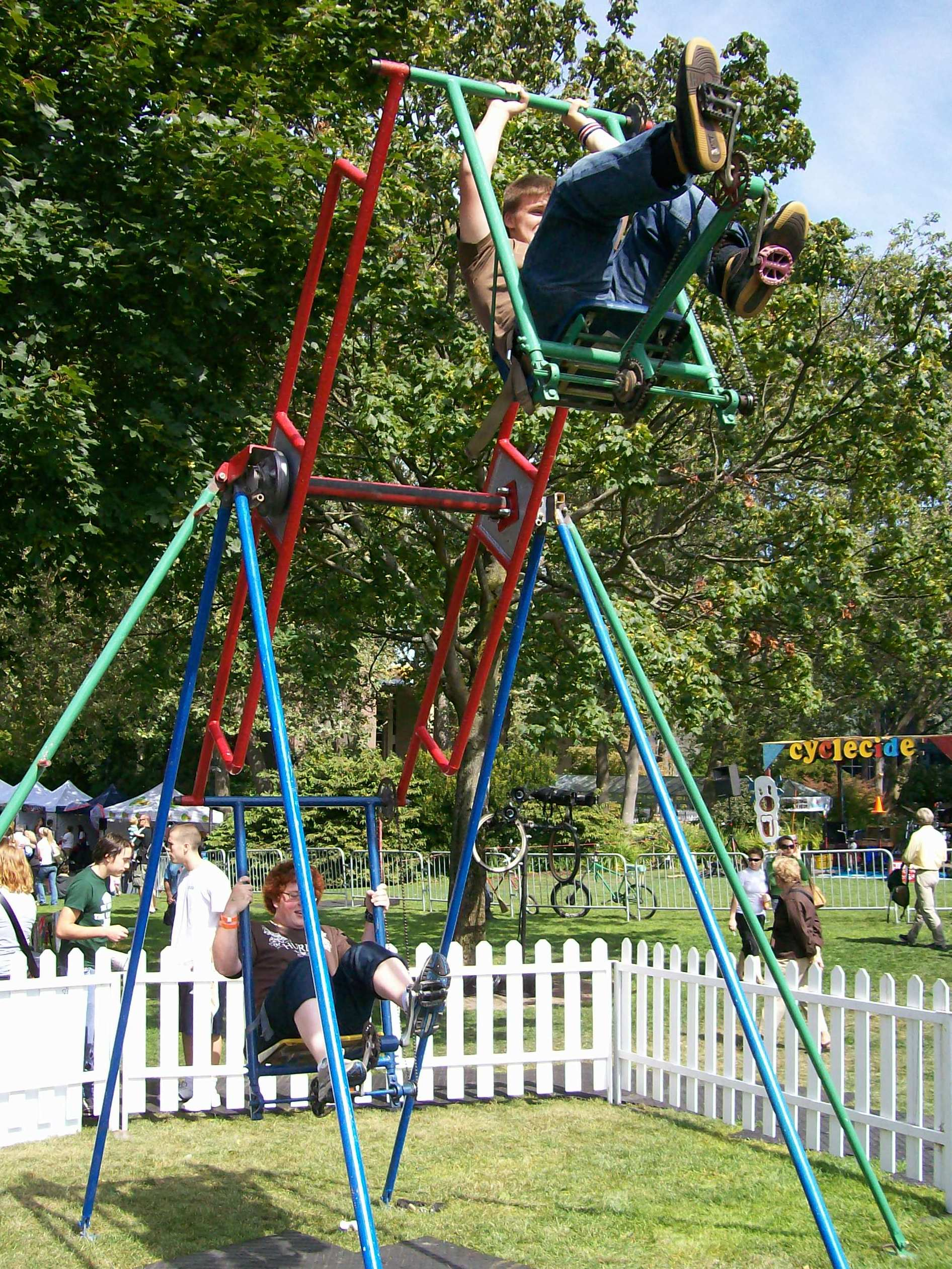
Cyclecide Ferris wheel at 2007 Bumbershoot festival in Seattle

The Cyclefuge assembled at ACE Junkyard, 2006.

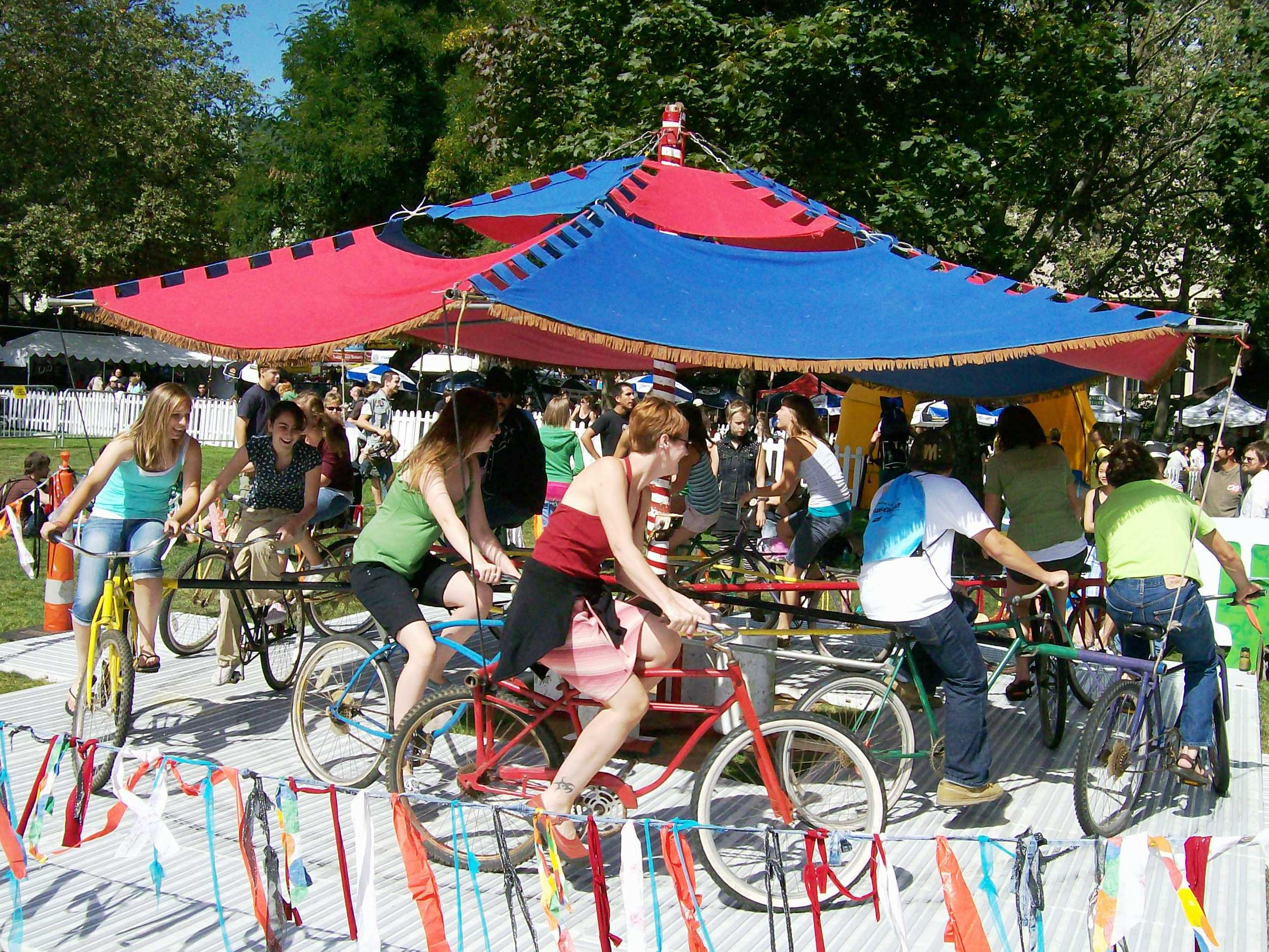
Bicycle carousel at 2007 Bumbershoot

Cyclecide also creates bike powered carnival rides. The first were quite primitive—the bicycle teeter-totter was a 10-foot 4x4 piece of wood with a 3-foot fulcrum. Then came the Bicycle Carousel—just like the one at the carnival, but you have to pedal the bikes to make it go around. Paul daPlumber designed and welded a two-seated, pedal-powered Ferris wheel for Cyclecide.

Other notable rides are the Cyclefuge, Whirl'N'Hurl, Spanking Bike, and Dizzy Toy.

== Performances ==
Cyclecide decided that they should do shows, collect money for beer and gas, and tour the country. Reese's role model of success without talent was Circus Redickuless. They have been paid to perform in the U.S., in places such as Austin, Berkeley, Boise, Durango, Flagstaff, Coachella Valley Music and Arts Festival), Los Angeles, Mexico City, New Orleans, New York, Oakland, Point Arena, Portland, Reno, San Francisco, Santa Cruz, Seattle, and Tucson.

While touring, anywhere from eight to 14 people live on an old converted school bus and drive from event to event. All the bikes are packed onto the roof in a custom, bus-long roof rack. Citizens witnessing the colorful bus full of dirty art punks pull into their town are agog. Around the San Francisco Bay Area, Cyclecide is often found billed at large art events such as 'Sand by the Ton' and Yuri's Night.

=== Acts ===
- Tall bike jousting
- Bicycle mosh pit
- Altered bikes

=== Tours ===
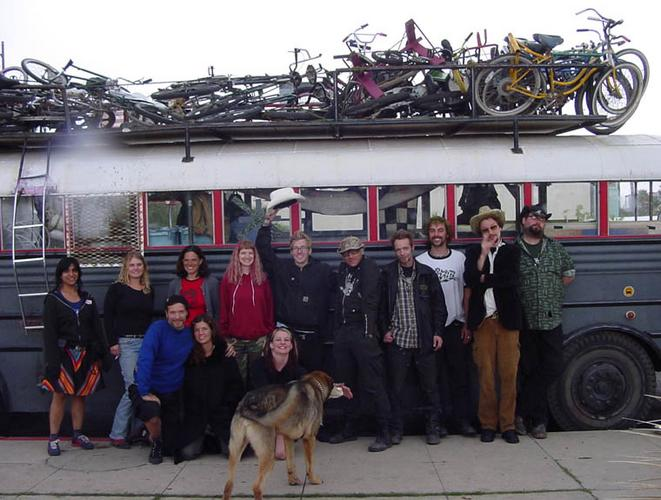
Crew at end of Spring 2003 Tour

- Fall 2004 – Tour de Fat
  - New Belgium Brewing Company hired Cyclecide to augment their beer-drinking campaign. Cities visited were: Boise, Reno, Omaha, Durango, Santa Fe, Phoenix, Flagstaff, Denver, Fort Collins, Minneapolis, St Louis. After that leg, Cyclecide continued on their own.
  - Firehouse, New Orleans
  - Cafe Mundi, Austin
  - Doublewide, Dallas
- Fall 2003 – Tour de Fat
  - Again, Cyclecide was hired by New Belgium Brewing Company and became part of their traveling show. Venues included: Tucson, Cafe Mundi (Austin), Smithville (Texas), Flagstaff, Santa Fe, Durango, Boulder, Fort Collins, Santa Cruz, Portland, and Berkeley.
- Summer 2003 – New Your
  - Madagascar, Brooklyn, New York
  - Phat Mandy Presents, The IACC Theater, Pittsburgh
  - Sibley Bike Depot, Minnesota
- Sprint 2003 – Tour de Tour Detour
  - Ace Junkyard, San Francisco
  - Rutimaya, Austin Texas
  - The Arc in New Orleans
  - Tultepec PyroTechnica Festival, Tultepec, Mexico
  - Hotel Congress, Tucson
- Summer 2000 – First Tour
  - StvCo North Hollywood
  - Abandoned Parking lot, Treasure Island, San Francisco
  - July 4 Festival, Point Arena, California

=== Festivals ===
Cyclecide has participated in several annual events.

- Maker Faire hosted by Make (magazine), San Mateo 2006–2015
- Coachella Festival, Indio 2002–2007
- Bumbershoot, Seattle 2007
- How Berkeley Can You Be Parade, Berkeley 2001–2005
- Street Fair and Fireworks, Point Arena 2000–2002
- Madagascar Street Festival, Brooklyn

=== Hosted events ===
Pedal Monster is a multi-day, annual event organized, promoted, and hosted by Cyclecide. Cyclecide invites all other altered bike clubs to San Francisco for a weekend of activities including a poker run, a day of feasting (BBQ), and a show with the rides set up.
