= Cyclone Warehouse =

Coordinates: 37.74943°N 122.38667°W

Cyclone Warehouse was a venue for underground art located in the Butcher Town area of San Francisco, California, between Potrero Hill and Hunter's Point. It was known for hosting eclectic events, and formerly served as headquarters to a loose collective of artists and artisans.

The space was founded in 1992 by Troy Shelton, Nicolas Desbons, Todd Martinez, Dan Hersey, Mark Reitman, Jason Price and Geordie Stevens, a group of students from CCAC and SFSU. They built the space primarily from found materials.

== Neighbors ==
The space was one of 15 bays in a larger warehouse – a mix of artists studios and small business workshops. Some of those neighbors have been "The Cave" (a rock venue in the 1990s run by Beky Bonk), Phase (seminal noise venue), Seemen (robotics artist), Ovarian Trolley (on Candy Ass Records), Who's on Third Studios, The Lodge, and Bay Area Metals (recycling center).

== Hosted artists ==
Cyclone Warehouse hosted a long list of events. Punk shows, industrial art, house/techno parties, dance performance, theater productions, circus, cabaret, and puppets were all part of the repertoire:

- T.V. Homicide
- Survival Research Laboratories
- Cyclecide Bike Rodeo
- Mia Zapata Benefit
- Big Top 23
- Captain Ricks Cabaret
- Seven Year Bitch
- Victims Family
- Steel Pole Bath Tub
- Woodpussy
- Idiot Flesh
- Hickey
- All You Can Eat
- Shellac
- Seemen
- Neurosis
- Ovarian Trolley
- The Chasm of Spasms
- The Islais Creek Fair
- Cookie Mongoloid
