= The Winking Circle =

The Winking Circle is a creative organisation originating in Uxbridge, Ontario. They create tall bikes, art cars and other community art programs.

Their work is documented in the short movie The Winking Circle Video Zine. In early 2005, Coca-Cola produced an advertisement clearly derivative of The Winking Circle's work.

They live by the Wisdom of the 3 Beans: Create Everywhere, Redeem Everything, Be A Fool. The Winking Circle's mission is the Eccentrification of the World.
