= Dooring =

Type of cycling accident

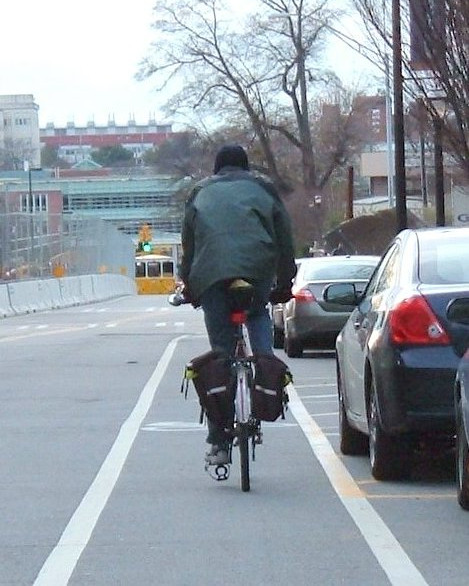
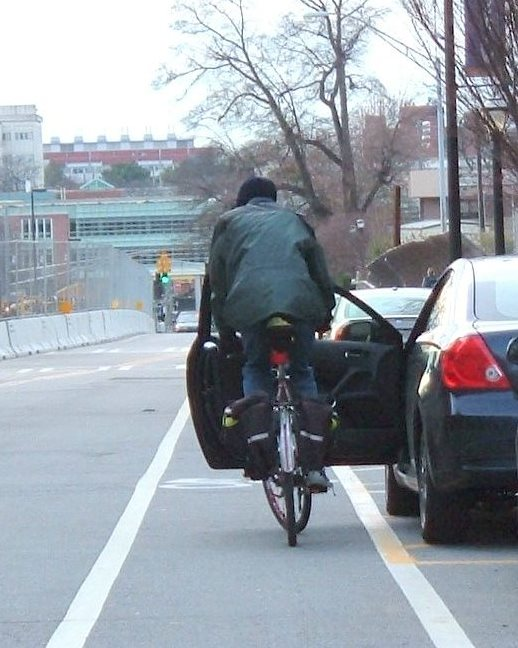
A cyclist in a bike lane situated in a door zone (left) is struck when a car door is opened unexpectedly (right).

Dooring is the act of opening a motor vehicle door into the path of another road user. Dooring can happen when a driver has parked or stopped to exit their vehicle, or when passengers egress from cars, taxis and rideshares into the path of a cyclist in an adjacent travel lane. The width of the door zone in which this can happen varies, depending upon the model of car one is passing. The zone can be almost zero for a vehicle with sliding or gull-wing doors or much larger for a truck. In many cities across the globe, doorings are among the most common and injurious bike-vehicle incidents. Any passing vehicle may also strike and damage a negligently opened or left open door, or injure or kill the exiting motorist or passenger.

Doorings can be avoided if the driver checks their side mirror before opening the door and performs a shoulder check to avoid the vehicle blind spot. Use of the Dutch Reach (or "far hand method") for vehicle egress has been advised to prevent doorings, as it combines both measures. As bicyclists cannot rely on motor vehicle occupants to use required caution on exiting, bicyclists are advised to avoid the door zone of stopped or parked vehicles.

The term is also applied when such sudden door opening causes the oncoming rider to swerve to avoid collision (with or without loss of control), resulting in a crash or secondary collision with another oncoming vehicle or another vehicle that is directly next to the cyclist. The term also applies when a door is negligently left open, unduly blocking a travel lane.

== Legal issues ==
Many countries are aligned with the Vienna Convention which states: "It shall be prohibited to open the door of a vehicle, to leave it open, or to alight from the vehicle without having made sure that to do so cannot endanger other road-users." (Article 24 — Opening of doors).

Most areas have laws that require car users to check for all approaching traffic including cyclists before opening the door of their vehicle. Some jurisdictions also consider it a traffic code violation if vehicle doors are unnecessarily left open and thus continue to obstruct an adjacent travel lane.

Despite such laws, serious injuries and deaths continue to be caused by occupants opening doors or by bicycle riders riding in the door zone. A 2015 British survey found that 35% of drivers self-reported that they did not check for traffic before opening their vehicle's door to exit.

== Avoidance and prevention ==
Dooring prevention has proven a difficult problem as incidents can occur wherever hinged vehicle doors are carelessly opened and suddenly obstruct travel lanes or sidewalks. Surveys of driver behavior upon egress, in the United Kingdom and the state of Florida, U.S., found that 35% and 60% of drivers respectively did not check for oncoming road users before opening.

Cyclists are advised to avoid door zones and exercise great caution if in range of open doors from either side when in traffic. Motorists and passengers are advised to exercise heightened caution and vigilance before and during entry or egress from their vehicle. Passengers are advised to exit curb-side only, and never when vehicles are paused in a travel lane.

Street planners are encouraged to avoid placing bike lanes in door zones, and to instead implement buffered, separated and/or protected bike lanes and tracks, or shared lane markings. Motor vehicle bureaus and departments of transportation are advised not to restrict vulnerable road users into door zone bike lanes by force of traffic code.

Motor vehicle engineers and manufacturers are deploying new technologies to warn or prevent vehicle occupants from exiting in the presence of oncoming traffic. Auxiliary side view mirrors are now available which fit on the B-pillar to assist rear-seated passengers preparing to exit.

Road safety advocates also call for greater enforcement, fines and penalties, while insurance companies and personal injury attorneys apply sanctions after the fact in the form of increased premiums and liability lawsuits.

Improved training in road sharing by motorists with vulnerable road users is recommended for all road users, done by means of upgraded driver licensing and education standards, curriculum and testing, and public education and behavior change campaigns to improve road safety conduct.

=== Education ===
Because it is rarely possible to see and react safely to a suddenly opening door, traffic cycling educational programs teach cyclists to ride in the safe zone or travel lane well outside the door zone as measured from the tip of the handlebars.

As street planners often lay out painted bike lanes in the door zone, many bicycle safety advocates advise cyclists to maintain a safe distance from car doors nonetheless and disregard such markings to do so. However riding on the margin of the bike lane places a cyclist in increased proximity to overtaking vehicles and also at risk of being squeezed closer into the doorzone. Other advocates therefore instruct bicyclists to take control of the full travel lane and adopt "vehicular cycling", to avoid dooring, considering this to be the safest position overall.

Also to avoid doorings, bicyclists are advised to exercise vigilance, scan for the presence or likelihood of an occupied parked or stopped vehicle. Risk is increased especially in areas and at times of high parking turnover, on main arteries, during morning and evening commutes, and in retail, restaurant and entertainment districts with parallel parking. Bicyclists are also advised to assure their visibility to motorists and in mirrors both day and night by the use of bright and reflective clothing, vests, reflectors and front lights. Marked caution, slow speed and preparedness to brake when in the door zone are also counselled.

=== Dutch Reach ===
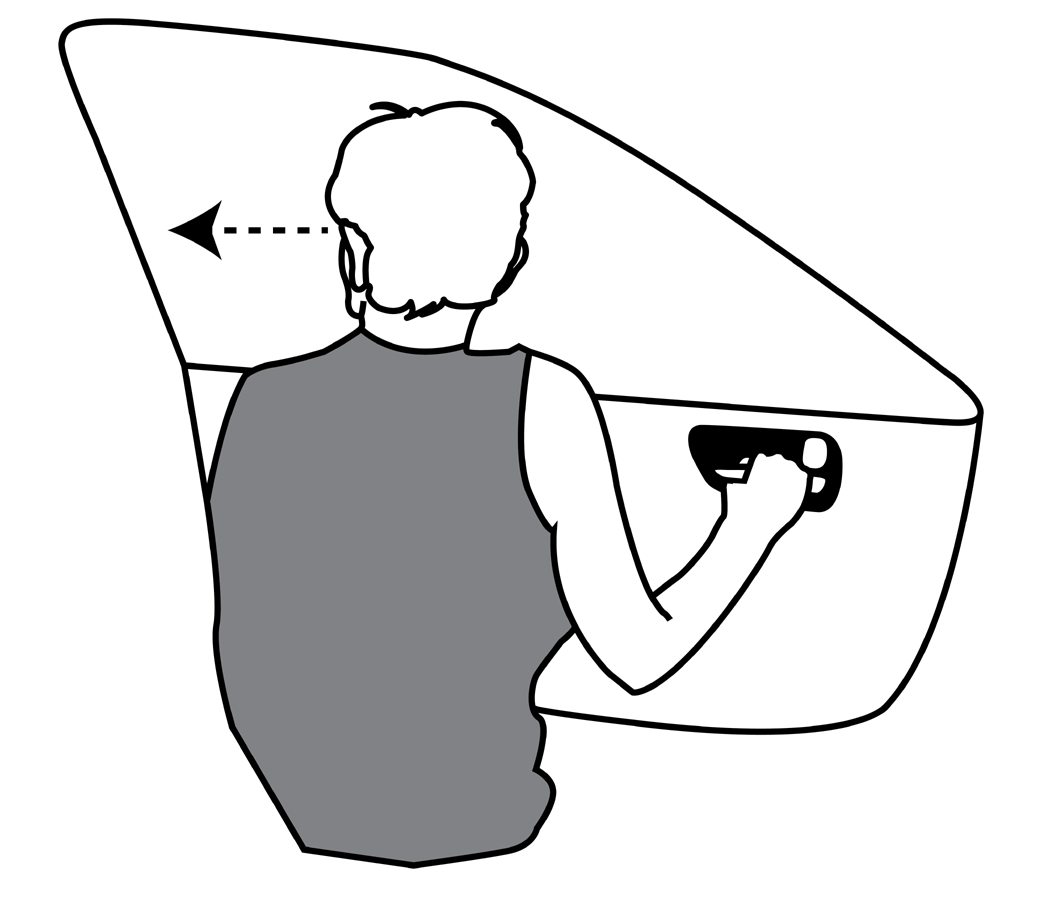
The Dutch Reach – using the far hand to open a car door

Motorists and passengers – both front and rear – may be able to make dooring less likely by practising the "Dutch Reach" – opening the car door by reaching across the body with the more distant hand which promotes a shoulder check – out and back – to scan for cyclists and other oncoming traffic.

Reaching across turns one's upper body and head outward. It encourages drivers and front passengers to use the side wing mirror, look out to the side and then over one's shoulder to scan for traffic before opening. Once the door is partly opened, as one leans out one's over-the-shoulder view is now clear, no longer limited by side pillar or door frame. Reaching across helps to curb wide, sudden opening as a further safeguard against dooring.

Even as the maneuver is becoming known elsewhere as the "Dutch Reach", in the Netherlands driving instructors and driving school companies refer to it by description and not by a name. The far hand move is not literally specified by Dutch traffic code to pass the safe parking section of the road test. Rather, Dutch regulations for licensing set two standards to ensure safe exiting of vehicles to protect vulnerable road users (VRUs), viz: Articles 4e and 6a. Some but not all Dutch driving instructors and texts for the theory examination teach the far hand maneuver as most assured to demonstrate safe exiting on both the written and road tests.

The reach method is likely less practiced by Dutch motorists today than in the 1960s–1980s when Dutch road fatalities numbered in the thousands and prompted the Stop de Kindermoord protest movement to end the carnage. Anecdotal reports date the 'reach across' practice to that era. But public awareness of the method in the Netherlands extends at least back to 1961. Since then bicycling in the Netherlands is much safer. Innovative and extensive infrastructure improvements, separate and protected cycle tracks, strict driver education and testing, popular use of bicycles for daily transport and dedication to road safety, all contributed to its dramatic decline in road injuries and fatalities. Yet dooring injuries and even fatalities in the Netherlands still occur, and the far hand method is still taught, though public awareness of it and its practice in the Netherlands has waned.

As noted above, the far hand technique does not have a Dutch name, but in 2016 an American physician in Cambridge, Massachusetts, U.S., coined the term to promote the Dutch method which was little known in the United States. The "Dutch Reach" coinage reflects that the method was common to the Netherlands before being 'imported' to the U.S. It was described as a Dutch road safety measure in the American mainstream press in 2011 by the New York Times and the Boston Globe in 2013.

The method can be traced beyond northern Europe starting in the 2010s. From 2011 to 2016 several bicycle advocacy organizations and road safety agencies in the United States, Canada and Australia added advisories or launched anti-dooring campaigns which included or featured the far hand countermeasure. In New Haven, Connecticut, it was variously called the "Amsterdam", "European cities'" or "reach-across" method (2013). In Fort Collins, Colorado, it became the "Opposite Hand Trick" (2014). However the tip remained nameless in San Francisco, California (2015); Montreal (2014), and Vancouver (2016), Canada; New Zealand (2015); and Victoria, Australia (2012). In Australia two slogans have emerged to prompt the habit: "Lead with your left" (origin uncertain); and "Always Cross Check", devised by a road safety organization.

In early 2017 the Royal Society for the Prevention of Accidents (UK) endorsed the Dutch Reach as the recommended road safety practice to avoid dooring collisions. In 2019, the National Safety Council (U.S.) and American Automobile Association began including the far hand reach in their respective defensive driving and novice driver course materials and road safety programs. National, state and local bicycle and pedestrian advocacy organizations have played an important part in promoting the measure. These include: We Are Cycling UK; the League of American Bicyclists; the Bicycle Network (AUS); the Cycling Action Network (New Zealand); New York Bicycle Coalition; Bicycle Friendly Driver Program of Fort Collins, Colorado; MassBike and Somerville Bicycle Committee.

Other governments are now adding the 'reach' to driver's manuals and education, taxi and for-hire ridesharing regulations, and road safety campaigns. Examples include: Great Britain, Commonwealth of Massachusetts, Illinois, Washington state, Pennsylvania, South Australia, Washington, D.C., City of London, Berlin, New York City Taxi & Limousine Commission, Cambridge, Massachusetts, and Burbank, California. In 2018, Addison Lee launched its own anti-dooring far hand reach campaign branding it 'the Addison Lean'. In April 2019 Lyft, a U.S. TNC implemented automatic in-app push notifications to prompt its drivers and clients in 22 U.S. cities to use the Dutch Reach when exiting. Uber followed one month later with a pilot Dutch Reach education program for its users & drivers in four North American cities. Some police departments, hospitals, motor vehicle insurance companies, transportation management companies and personal injury law firms have also begun promoting the method.

Until 2018, the scientific safety literature had been silent on the relative merits or flaws of near hand versus far hand egress from vehicles. However a human factors research paper Validating the Dutch Reach presented at the 7th International Cycling Safety Conference in October 2018, found initial evidence for its safety advantage. In 2019 British automaker Aston Martin introduced a reversed door latch lever in its Vantage sports car whose ergonomic design strongly favors far-hand use for opening while making the near hand habit awkward.

=== Automated systems ===
Several automakers and automotive technology companies have introduced or are now developing advanced driver assistance systems (ADAS) to help prevent doorings. Technologies include use of external onboard cameras and sensors, seat buckles, or GPS data, computer recognition software etc. linked to sound or light signals or door operation to alert or warn drivers and/or cyclists, or forestall door opening.

At least one auto-parts supplier has developed an automatic detection system to prevent or warn the user before opening the car door if a bicycle is approaching.

However, the introduction of automatically folding side view mirrors may increase the risk of dooring should the mirrors retract before the occupants exit the vehicle.

== Prevalence ==
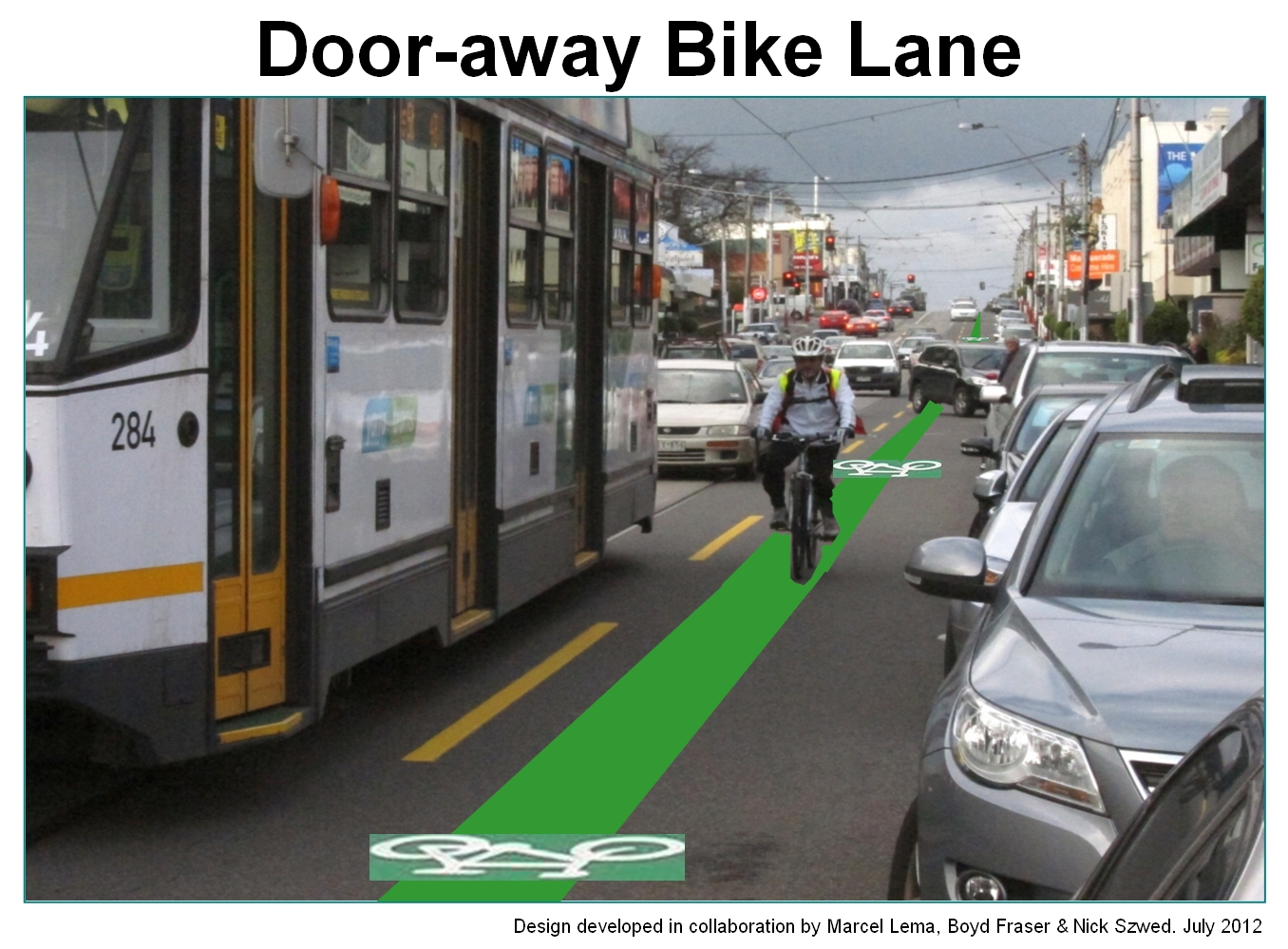
Narrow bike lane concept intended to avoid door zone

It is difficult to find statistics on the incidence of door zone fatalities, serious injuries, and collisions as the type of accident is often not recorded consistently from city to city. However, an analysis of Chicago, U.S. bike crashes found that there were 344 reported dooring crashes reported in 2011, for a rate of 0.94 doorings per day. Doorings made up 19.7% of all reported bike crashes. The number of additional doorings that occurred without being reported is unknown. In 2016, San Francisco Municipal Transportation Agency in America reported that for the period 2012–2015, doorings of bicyclists constituted 16% of injurious or fatal bike-vehicle incidents in which the cyclist was likely not at fault. A 2015 study for the City of Vancouver, British Columbia in Canada found that doorings accounted for 15.2% of all bike collisions and was the foremost cause of bike-vehicle collision injuries which resulted in hospital emergency department treatment (22%) – not including additional injury incidents due to dooring avoidant swerve crashes requiring emergency treatment.

=== Collisions ===
In Toronto, "motorist opens door in path of cyclist" collisions were 11.9% of all reported car/bike collisions in 2003; however, it is difficult to determine exactly how many bicycle accidents and serious injuries are attributed to dooring because the Ontario Ministry of Transportation does not classify dooring as a collision, and therefore these numbers are not regularly reported alongside other types of bicycle accidents. There are reports that in Toronto alone, dooring incidents increased by 58% in the three-year period between 2014 and 2016. Eight percent of serious injuries to cyclists in London in 2007 were caused by cyclists swerving to avoid opening car doors. In the Australian state of Victoria between 2006 and 2010, car door openings caused eight percent of serious injuries to cyclists.

=== Relative risk ===
Relative to other collisions such as getting rear ended, getting doored is less risky: "80.04% of those cyclists who were doored were injured, while 94.40% of those in non-dooring crashes were injured." Also, getting doored itself usually is not fatal; rather, most serious door-zone-related injuries are sustained by getting hit by a motor vehicle after colliding with or swerving to avoid the obstructing door. Thus, most dooring deaths and serious injuries occur in the travel lane and not in the door zone.

=== Fatalities ===
As with other dooring statistics, even fatalities are often under-reported as, for example, secondary collisions after door avoidant swerves may not be recognized by authorities, the media, witnesses or perpetrators as due to a dooring incident. Also, in some jurisdictions, dooring is not officially considered a motor vehicle collision if the vehicle is parked. Informal logs of dooring fatalities based on found media reports have been maintained on the internet. An annotated, international memorial spreadsheet with entries from 1987 to the present is currently maintained by an American cycling safety advocate.

In New York City, 3% (7 out of 225) of bicyclist fatalities in the ten-year period between 1996 and 2005 were from striking an open door or swerving to avoid one. In London, three people were killed in car door opening incidents between 2010 and 2012. In two peer reviewed studies, 124 deaths in London during 1985–1992, and 142 deaths in New Zealand during 1973–1978, none of the fatalities occurred in door opening incidents. While there were 1112 collisions caused by opening doors in the Australian state of Victoria between 2000 and 2010, the first fatality occurred in March 2010.

=== Bike lanes and door zone incidents ===
A 1976 study in a comparison of Santa Barbara (without bike lanes) to Davis, California (with bike lanes), 8% of the car-bike collisions in Santa Barbara involved an opening door, whereas Davis had none.

=== Self-driving cars ===
As of September 2025, Waymo has been involved in seven injury-causing cyclist crashes, three of which were doorings by Waymo passengers.

In June 2025, a cyclist sued Waymo after being doored by a Waymo passenger. The lawsuit alleges that the Waymo car parked in an unsafe spot and failed to warn the passengers before exiting.

== See also ==
- Outline of cycling
- Cycling infrastructure
- Shared lane marking
