= Tall bike =

Unusually tall bicycle

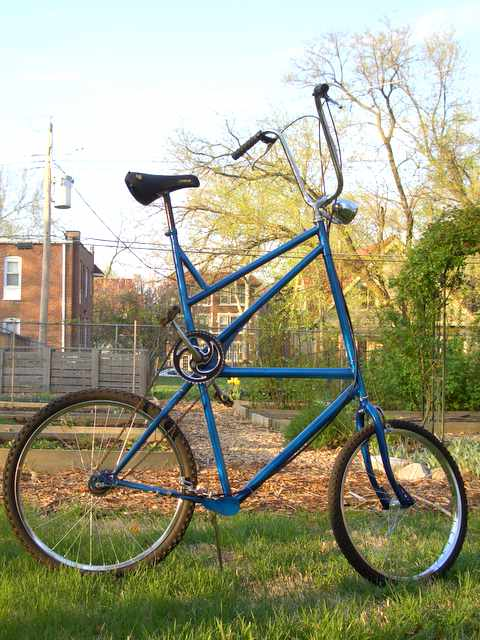
A modern home-constructed tall bicycle

A tall bike is an unusually tall bicycle often constructed by hobbyists from spare parts. Typically, two conventional bicycle frames are connected by welding, brazing, or other means, one atop the other. The drive train is reconfigured to connect to the upper set of pedals, and the controls are moved to the upper handlebar area.

Alternatively, a bicycle can be built by inverting the frame, inserting the fork from the 'wrong side', flipping the rear wheel, adding a long gooseneck and tall handlebars, then welding an extended seat post tube to the 'bottom' (now the top) of the frame. This type of tall bike is made with only one bike frame and is often called an upside-down bike rather than a tall bike, though the seat can be pretty high, depending on the frame shape used. This type is safer, as there is less tubing between the rider's legs and dismounting in a hurry can be easily accomplished.

Finally, a tall bike frame can be made from scratch.

== Practical uses ==
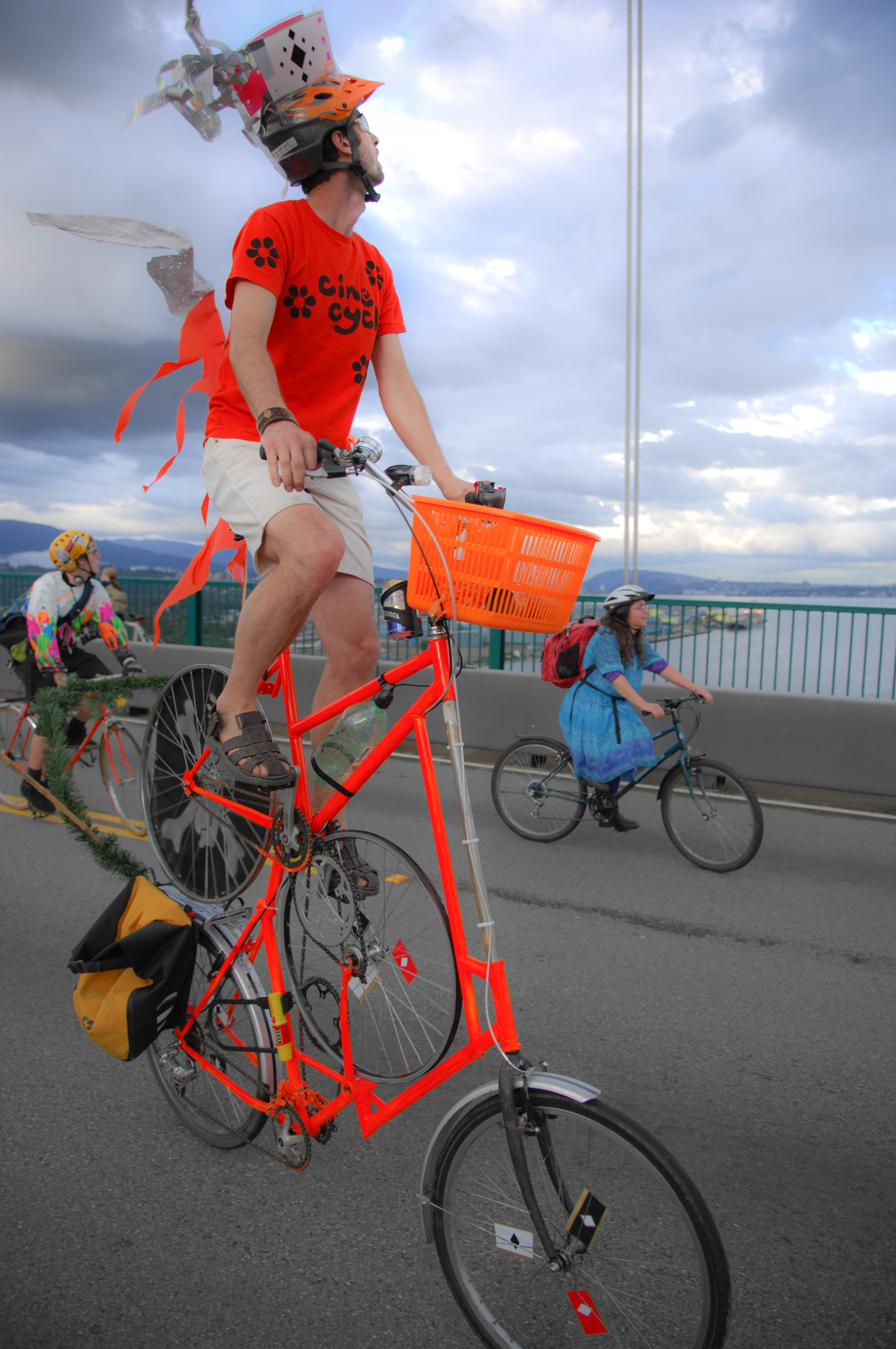
A cyclist on a tall bike

Tall bikes are usually used for recreation and entertainment but can also be used for general transportation. Regular tall-bike commuters note that their increased visibility and the simple 'wow factor' give them a safety advantage in automobile traffic over 'short bikes.' However, there are issues with mounting and dismounting similar to those presented by penny-farthings.

== History ==
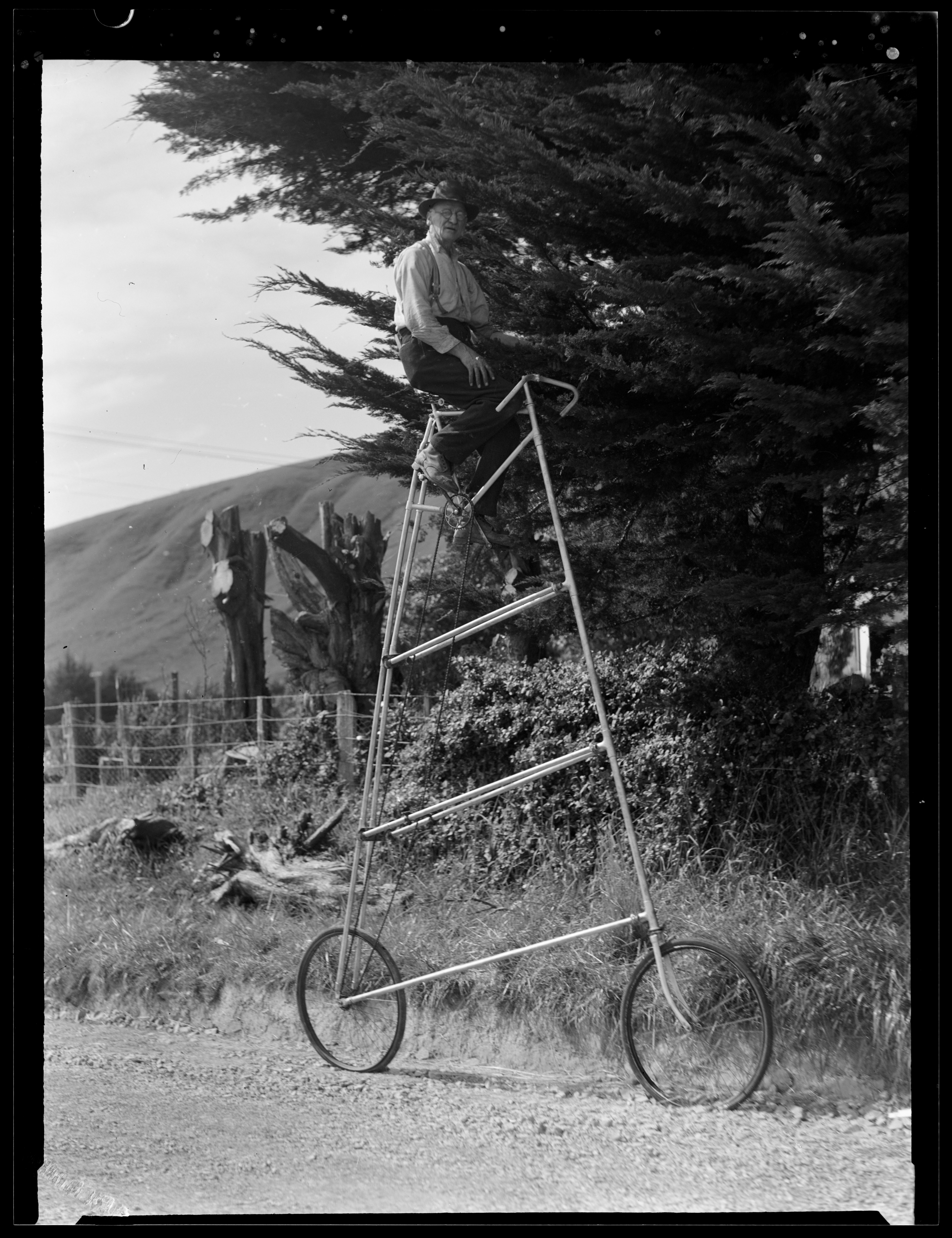
A man on a tall bicycle in rural New Zealand, 1949

Historically, one of the first practical uses of the tall bike was as a late 19th-century lamp lighting system, by which a worker would mount a specialized tall bicycle while equipped with a torch for lighting gas lamps. As the workers rode to each lamp, they would lean against the lamp post, light it, and then ride to the next. Upon completing the lamp circuit, an assistant will help the rider dismount. For this reason, the term 'lamplighter' is still sometimes used to refer to a very tall bicycle.

== Sporting ==
Tall bike jousting is a popular sport among tall bike owners and is commonly considered to have been introduced by Jake Houle and Lil' Bob of the Hard Times/Black Label Bike Club. Combatants arm themselves with lances and attempt to score points by dislodging the other rider. Rules vary by area and with the mood of the combatants. Like all jousting games, participants consider it a sport in which honor plays a role and dishonorable wins are frowned upon.

Jousters create lances that vary from simple PVC pipe and foam devices that are flexible, soft, and relatively safe, up to wooden or metal lances that may be quite dangerous. Regional rules vary, some specifying flaming lances for effect, or glass containers attached to the end, the goal being to break the glass container to score points.

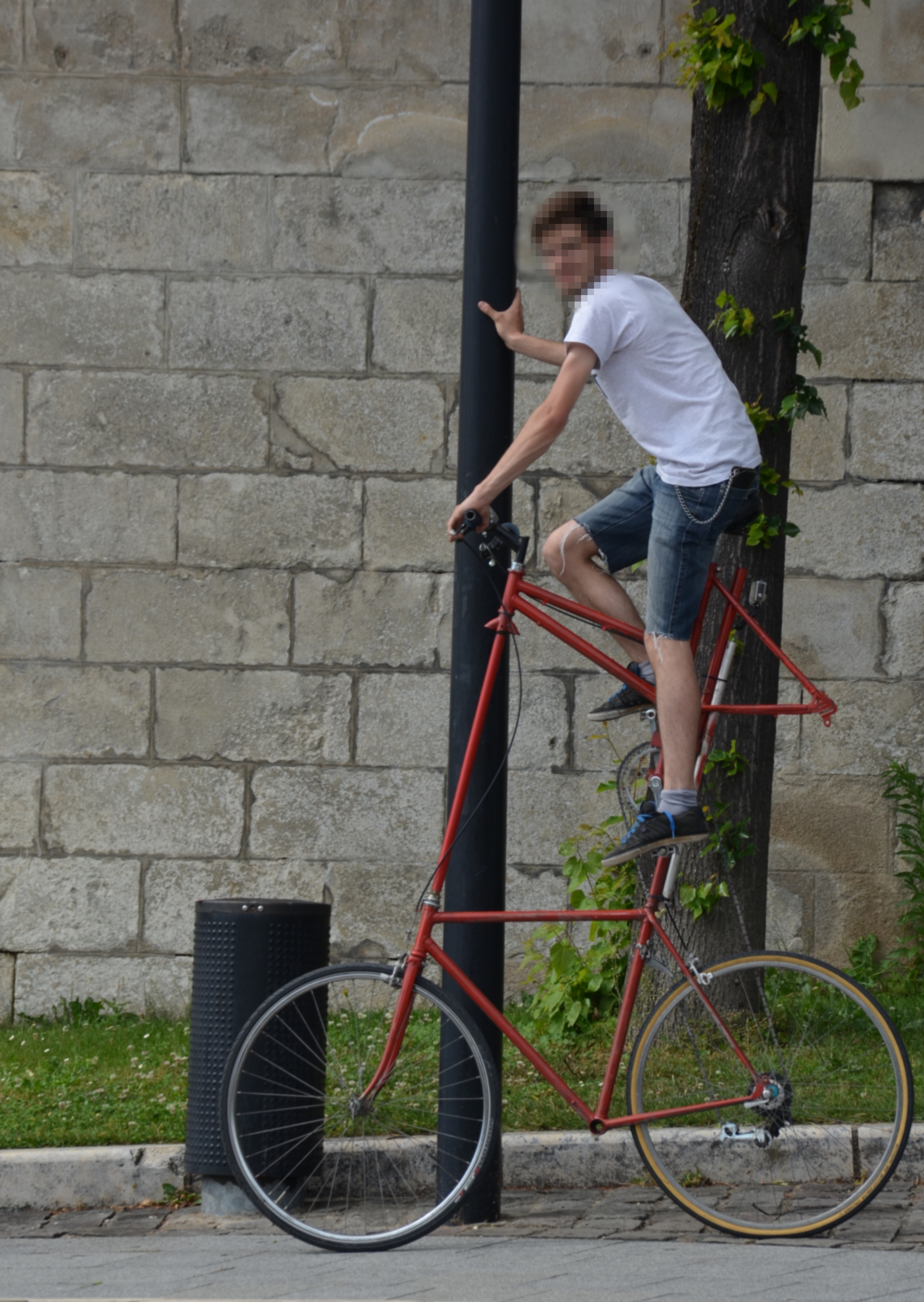
A tall bike during the 10th Bourges' Critical Mass in 2018

== Design considerations ==
Tall bikes present some interesting design considerations, and different localities tend to have different methods of dealing with them.

One consistent issue is that the seat tends to end up in line with, or behind, the rear axle, which creates a powerful tendency to lift the front wheel of the bicycle on acceleration. Some bicycle builders simply accept this tendency, but others solve the problem by moving the seat post forward, lowering the handlebars, moving the rear wheel backward, or by using a smaller wheel in front, typically a 24" instead of a 26".

Stability can also be negatively affected, and enhancements such as extended wheelbase by welding extensions on the front and rear dropouts can benefit stability. Contest holders often place restrictions on such modification to prevent unfair advantages.

See the bicycle and motorcycle geometry and bicycle and motorcycle dynamics articles for more on these issues.

== Clubs ==
Tall bikes are a popular mode of transportation for such notable modern 'bicycle clubs' as Midnight Ridazz, Angelopes, SCUL, Zoobomb, Rat Patrol, Black Label Bicycle Club, The Winking Circle, C.h.u.n.k. 666, Cyclecide, and activist groups.

They are also a mainstay among builders of clown bikes, art bikes, clown alleys and parade groups.

== Gallery ==
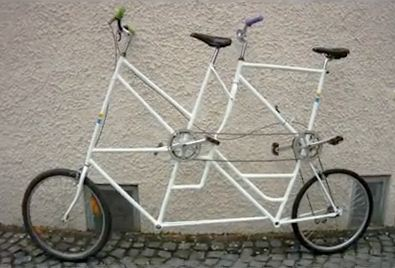
Tandem tall bike

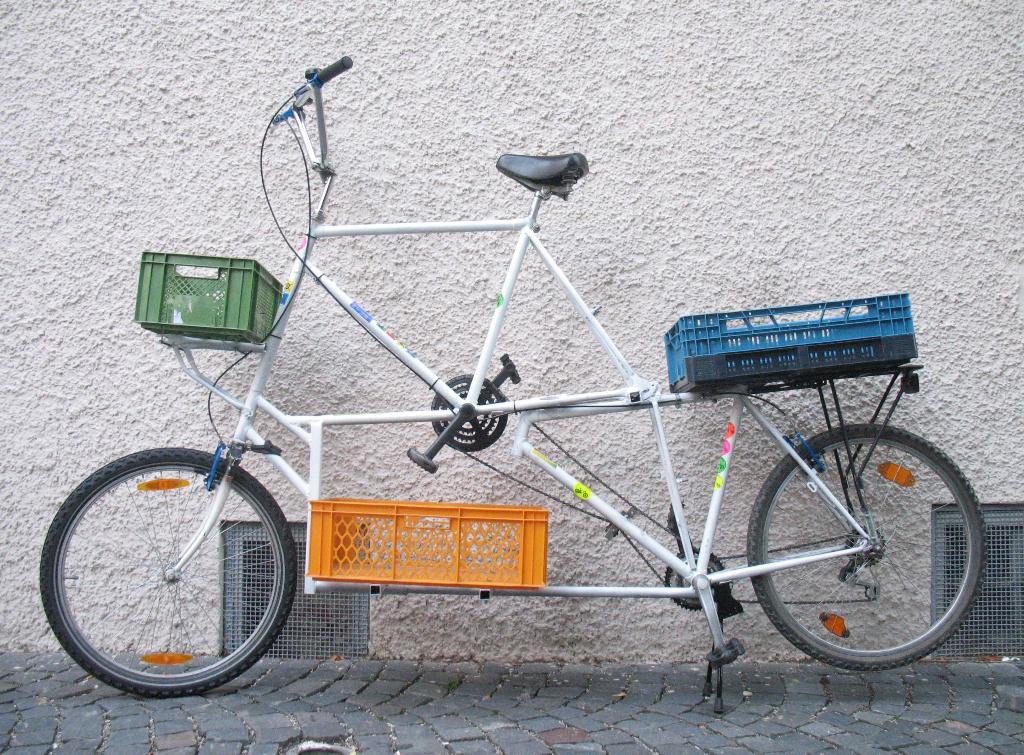
Long tall bike

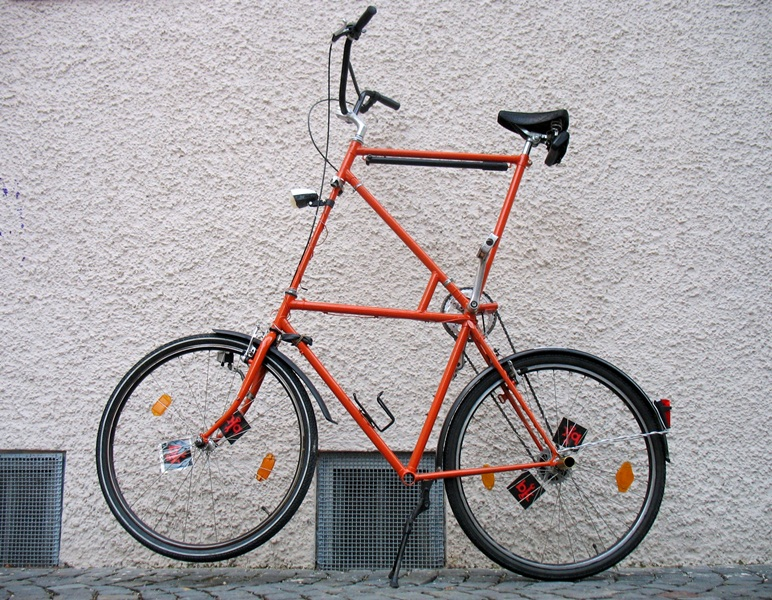
Tall bike with simple construction

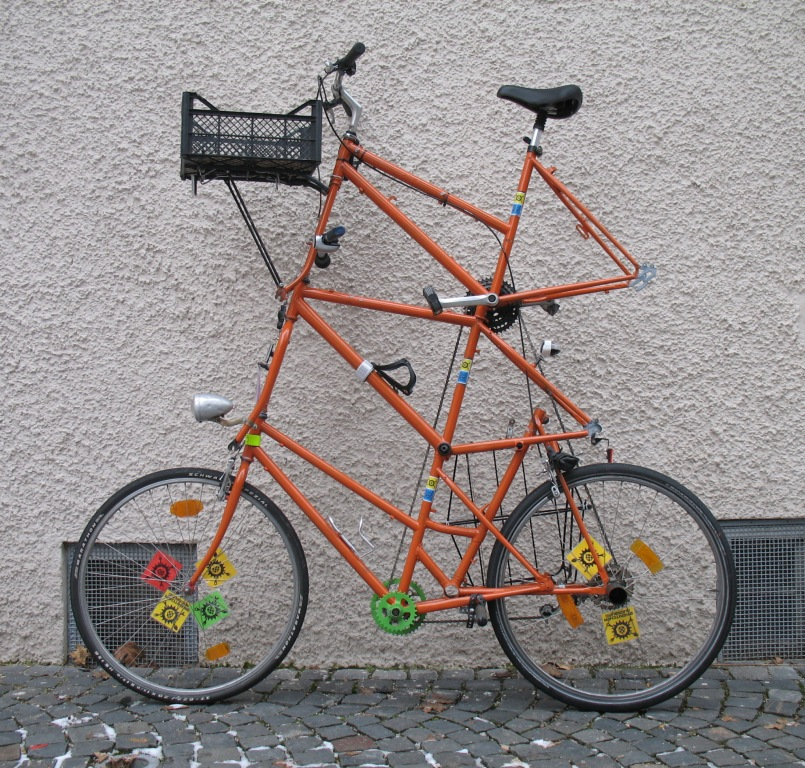
Tall bike with complicated construction

== See also ==
- Lowrider bicycle
- Outline of cycling
- Velocipede
