= Bicycle rodeo =

Type of cycling lesson

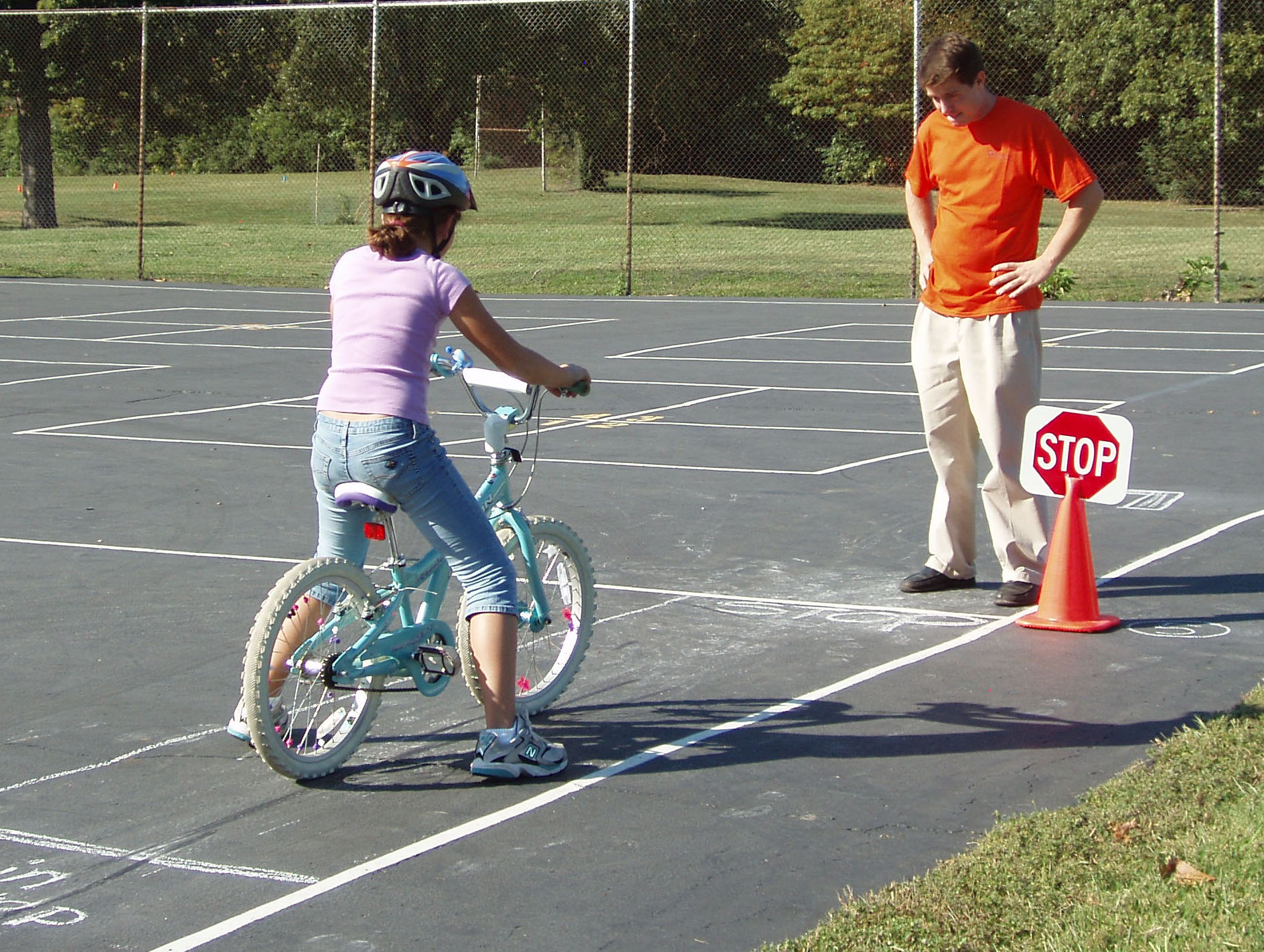

A bicycle rodeo is an organized event to teach children how to ride a bicycle safely.

== Origin ==
In the United States, Kiwanis clubs were the first to organize children’s bicycle safety classes in their communities. This began with lectures, and later, seminars. Eventually, clubs developed a more hands on approach, helping the events gain in popularity and resulting in the name “bicycle rodeo”.

In Denmark, a similar concept, called mobil cykelbanes (mobile bicycle playgrounds) was introduced around 2012.

== Organizers ==
Bicycle rodeos are usually run by local police departments. According to Police Chief Rosanne M. Sizer of the Portland, Oregon Police Department, "it's important that our children understand bicycle safety. This is an opportunity for area youth to learn important skills, and in the process, get to know some of our bicycle, traffic, and reserve officers." The Kiwanis clubs continue to run rodeos in collaboration with the police departments. Other known rodeo organizers are schools, outdoor recreation companies, the Boy Scouts of America, State Farm Insurance, and large bicycle shops or sporting goods stores.

== Activities ==
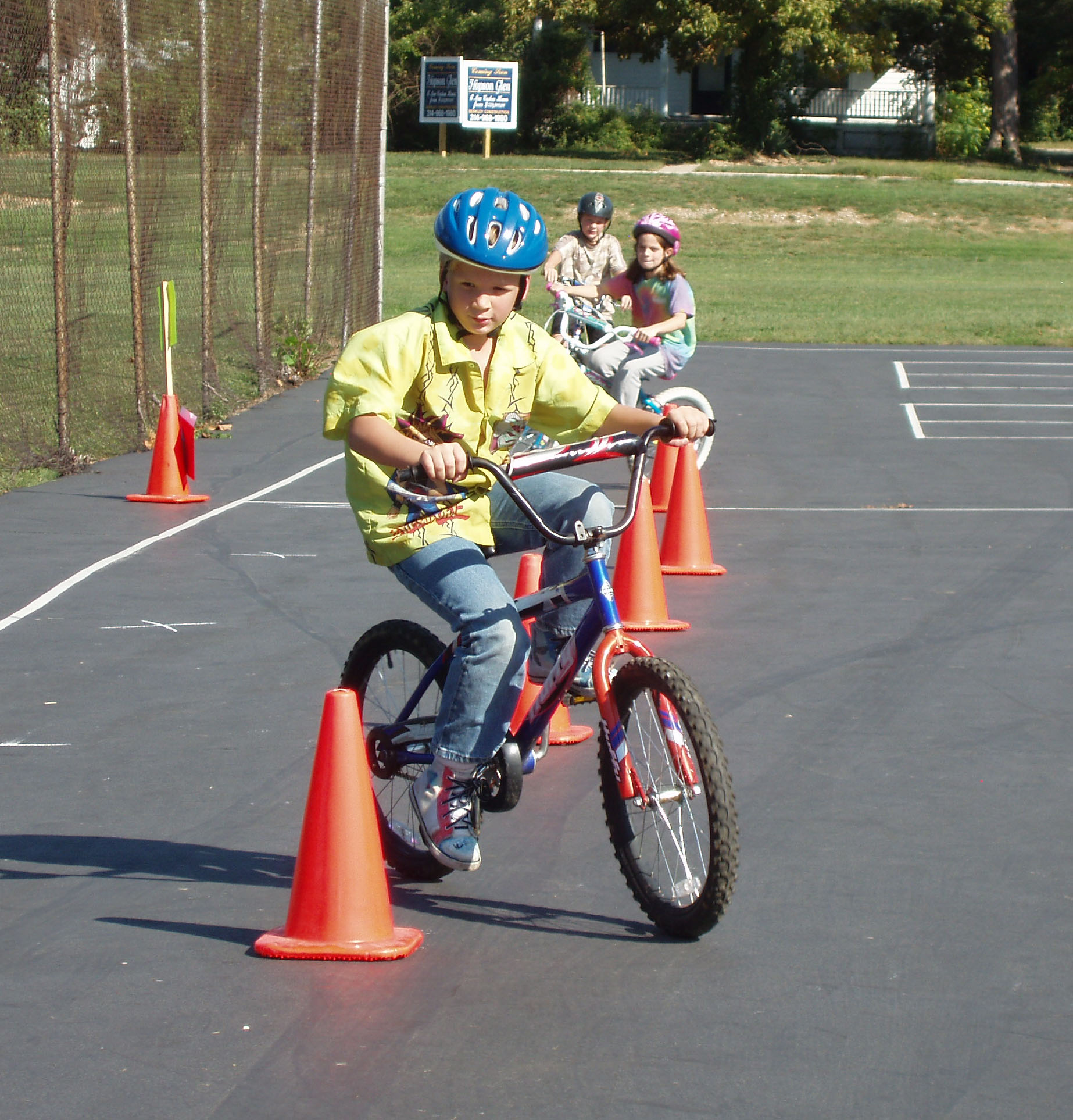

Bicycle Rodeos are usually curated for a 4–13 year old audience. They typically begin with a short lecture on bicycle safety, which is followed by a written exam. Children then test their skills on a simulated road test in Safety Town, a small-scale town where children are confronted to real life situations such as traffic lights, stop signs, pedestrians, and intersections.

Rodeos are a popular place for local businesses set up sales booths and give away gifts to the children. Often, local radio stations will broadcast their shows live from the rodeo and provide music.

=== Skills courses ===
In a typical bicycle rodeo, children must master eight courses order to pass the course. All these courses aim to help the child manoeuvre their bike comfortably, and they usually include mounting and dismounting the bicycle, changing direction and turning in circles, steering through tight spaces, weaving, stopping quickly, turning around, riding slowly, and tight turns.

=== Safety course ===
Bicycle rodeos also offer a safety course, where riders learn to check for proper helmet and bicycle fit, and to perform an “ABC” quick check on their bicycle, checking for (A) air in the tires, (B) working brakes, and (C) aligned chains.

=== Other activities ===
Bicycle rodeos often offer a variety of activities which children are free to explore after completing their bicycle safety course. This may include food stands, bicycle skill contests, and free prizes provided by local businesses.

== See also ==
- Cyclecide — a traveling show called "The Bike Rodeo", not a children's safety clinic
