= Bicycle safety =

Safety practices to reduce risk associated with cycling

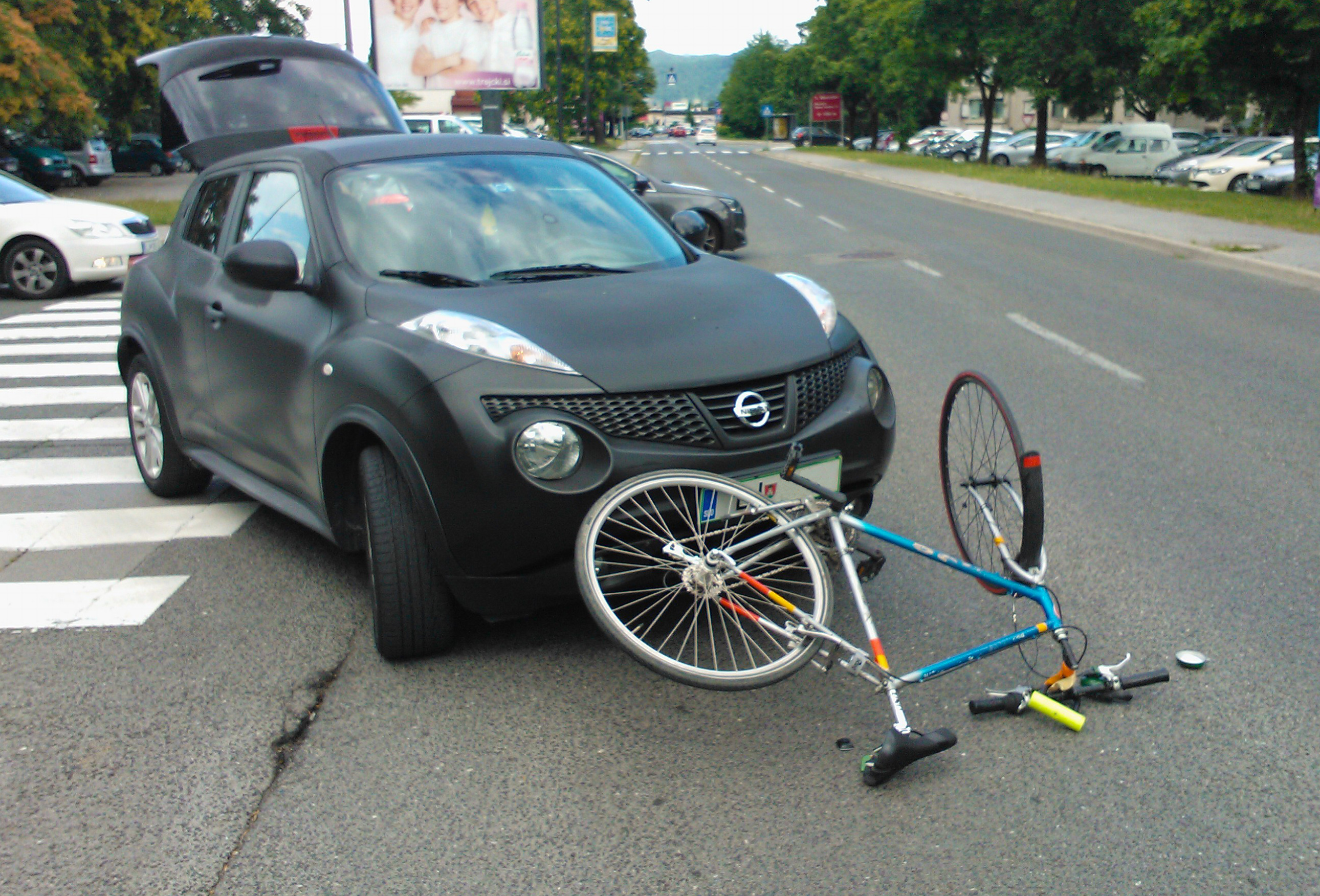
Incident where a cyclist was hit by a car

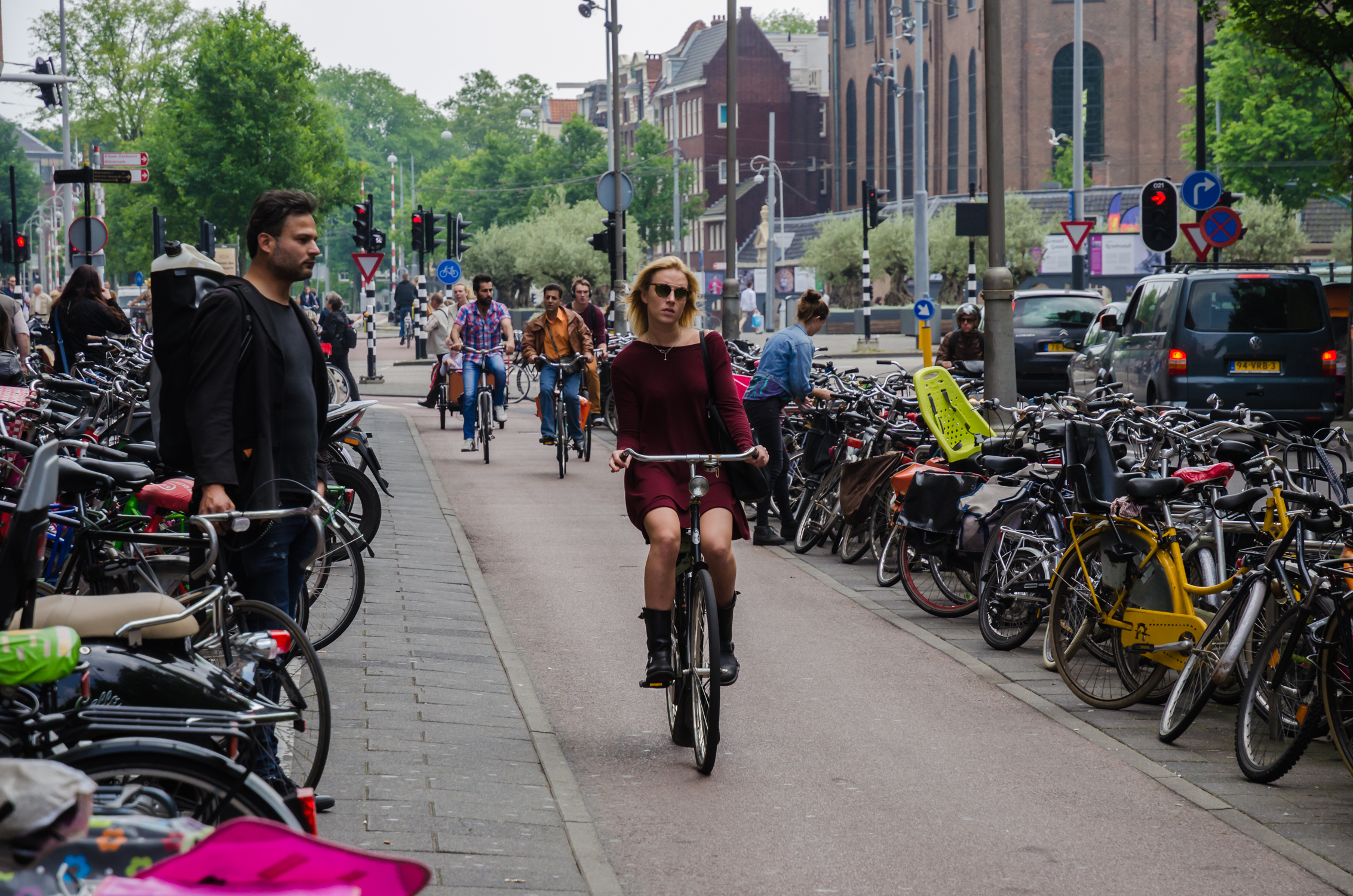
Segregated cycling along a Fietspad in Amsterdam. Cycling in the Netherlands is common and safe due to road designs that separate bicycle traffic from motor vehicles.

Bicycle safety is the use of road traffic safety practices to reduce risk associated with cycling. Risk can be defined as the number of incidents occurring for a given amount of cycling. Some of this subject matter is hotly debated: for example, which types of cycling environment or cycling infrastructure is safest for cyclists. The merits of obeying the traffic laws and using bicycle lighting at night are less controversial. Wearing a bicycle helmet may reduce the chance of head injury in the event of a crash.

Most bicycling fatalities occur as a result of collision with a motor vehicle. Studies in multiple countries have found that drivers are at fault in the majority of these crashes.

== Crashes ==
The first recorded bicycle crash occurred in 1842, reportedly between Kirkpatrick McMillan, an early rider of the velocipede, and a young girl in Glasgow. The report, however, is vague and the identification disputed.

The overall risk of death from a cycling accident in developed countries has diminished over the last 25 years according to a 2017 analysis of OECD statistics. In the United States, cycling remains a more dangerous mode of transportation when compared to automobiles (not considering total distance traveled). According to NPR, the number of bicyclists hit by vehicles rose at an alarming rate during the COVID pandemic, and a leading cause of this was poor bicycle infrastructure.

The Centers for Disease Control and Prevention counted, in the United States, over 32,000 automobile related deaths in 2013. By comparison, WISQUARS, the CDC's injury statistics website, found just over 1,000 deaths from cycling in 2015. Despite the relative safety compared to automobiles, the number of fatalities and hospitalizations from cycling is significantly greater in the United States compared to other western states such as Germany, Canada, and the Netherlands. In a 2014 analysis, there were 4.7 cycling deaths per 100 million kilometers cycled in the U.S., compared to 1.3 deaths per 100 million kilometers in Germany, 1.0 in the Netherlands, and 1.1 in Denmark. In the United Kingdom, cyclists have half of the rate (killed and serious injury per km) of motorcyclists but eight times the rate for motorists.

Causes of crashes vary according to local conditions. Road conditions, weather, speed, brakes, rider visibility, bicycle and automobile traffic, driving under the influence, riding under the influence, and distracted driving are contributing factors to accidents. Many bicycle crashes are unreported and therefore not included in official statistics.

An international survey on underreporting of the most severe cycling collisions found reporting rates ranging between 0% (Israel) and 35% (Germany). Furthermore, there is biasing in the kinds of collisions that appear in official data (i.e. police, hospital, or insurance data). It is known that collisions where a motorised vehicle is not involved as a collision partner i.e. single cyclist, cyclist-pedestrian or cyclist-cyclist collisions have lower odds of being reported to the police. Lower severity collisions (including those that do not result in hospital attendance) can incur significant costs, and result in long-term effects. The Belgian SHAPES project found costs for minor injuries primarily related to loss of productivity, and other intangible costs. The French ESPARR study found that close to half of those who experience a minor injury in a road traffic collision in Rhône (MAIS1 or MAIS2) still experienced regular pain after a year.Therefore, the characteristics of cyclist collisions is an active area of research. In the United States, bicycle crashes may be grounds for personal injury lawsuits.

== Hazards ==
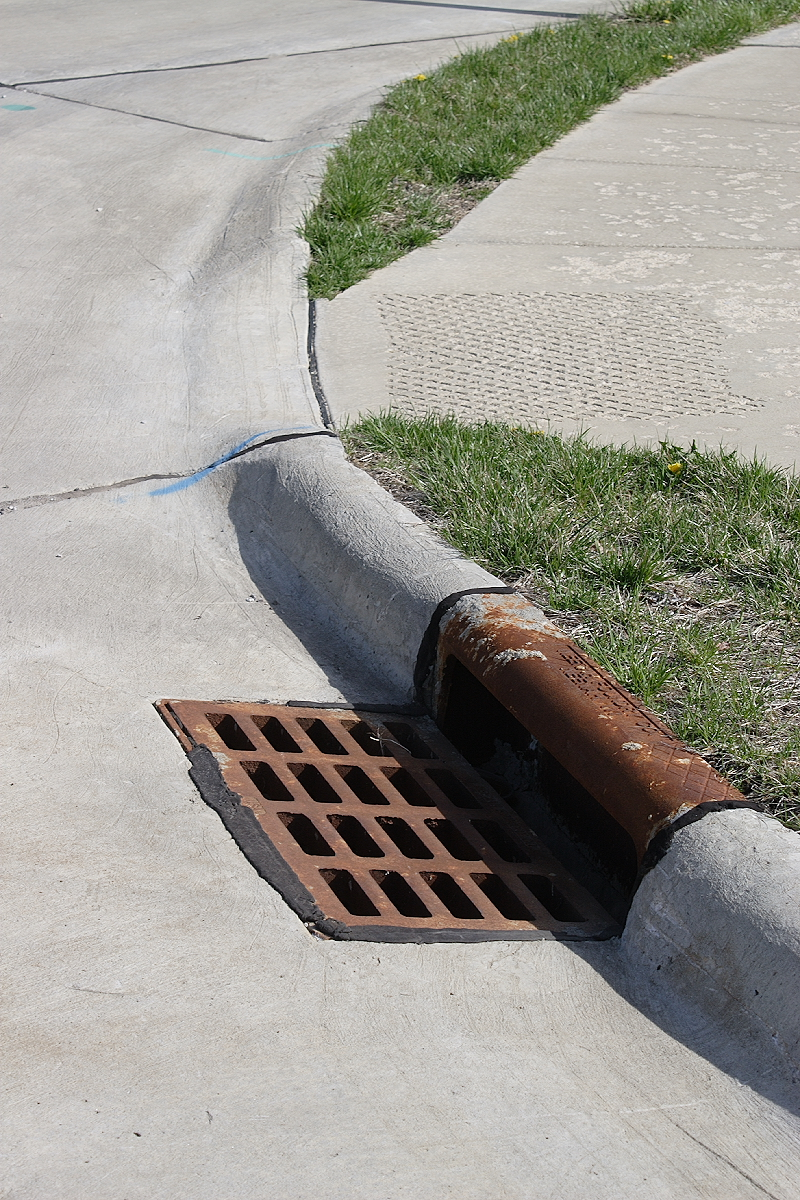
Hazardous slots in storm drain where cyclists' tires may get stuck

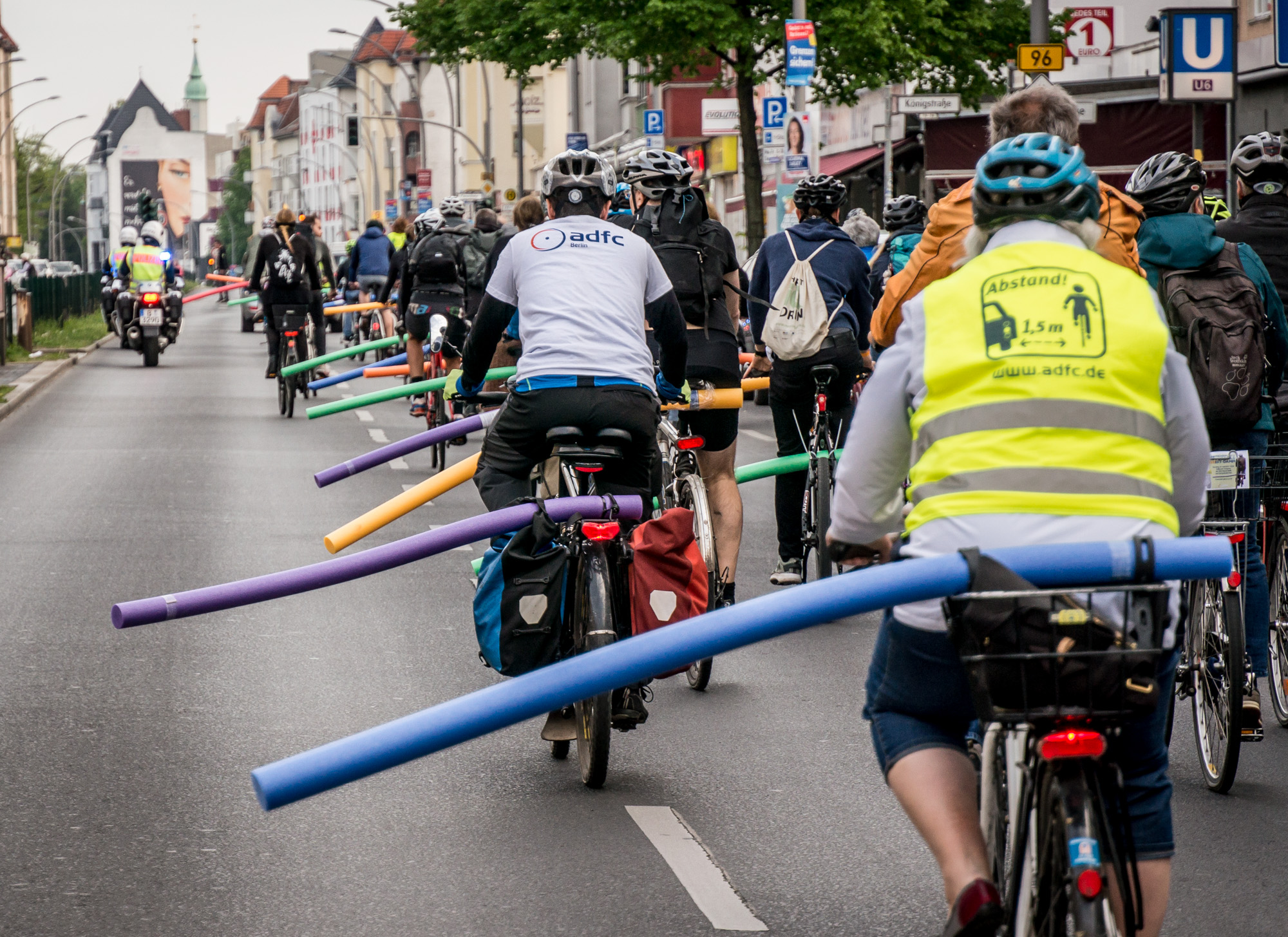
Bicyclists demonstrating a safe overtaking distance with the use of pool noodles as safety wings.

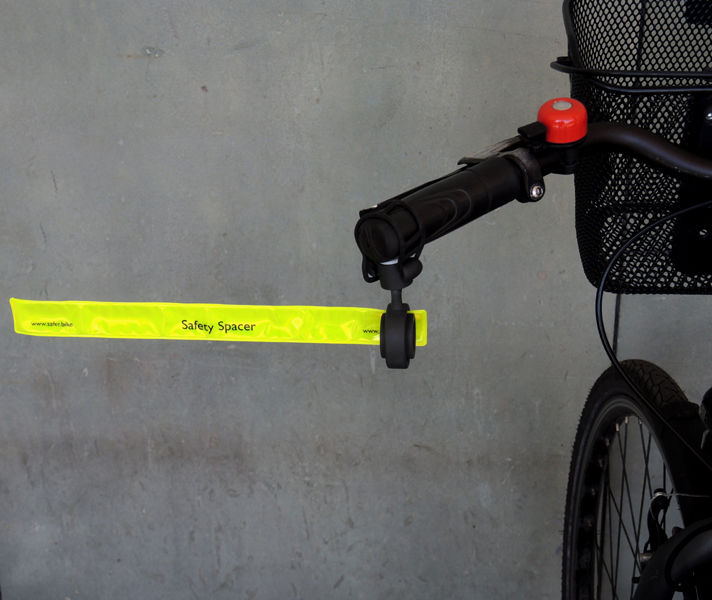
A slap wrap fixed on the handlebar used as a safety spacer for maintaining a safe overtaking distance.

Hazards to cyclists include:

- Failure of drivers to see or anticipate bicycles. This happens especially at cross sections where cyclists are often forced to ride on bike infrastructure to the right (in right-hand drive jurisdictions) of traffic. Especially when large trucks are involved, the cyclist can fall under the wheels of the motor vehicle. (Some trucks are equipped with metal side guards to prevent this.)
- Dooring - When a vehicle door is opened without checking for passing cyclists beforehand and so the cyclist collides with the vehicle door. This is associated with the commonplace layout of streets with vehicles parallel parked near the curb, and cyclists riding between parked vehicles and moving vehicles. Cyclists can protect themselves from dooring by riding outside of the door zone and never right next to parked cars.
- Getting a wheel stuck in a road irregularity, such as a large pothole, railroad track, storm drain, expansion joint, or edge of a driveway. This can cause the bicycle to stop while the rider goes over the handlebars, or it can cause the wheel to travel in a direction different from the rest of the bicycle, which can lead to falling sideways.
- Proceeding past stopped traffic can result in collisions with vehicles entering or exiting a junction or turn. Oncoming bicycles may not be visible to drivers as the stopped vehicles may block them from seeing cyclists until the last minute. Lane splitting is specifically illegal in some jurisdictions.
- Bicycling in rain or snow can significantly decrease visibility if wearing glasses, goggles, or helmet with wind screen, due to lack of windshield wipers.
- Falling sideways if going too slowly or carrying a heavy, unbalanced load.
- Falling due to lack of traction on slippery surfaces, such as ice, mud, or railroad track.
- Road rage: Some vehicle drivers may try to 'punish' cyclists for what they perceive as selfish behaviour in 'holding them up unnecessarily' and so when overtaking them will pass them too closely or cut in too sharply or sound their horn at them. [This endangerment often leads to prosecution in UK if the cyclist submits a video to bodies such as Operation SNAP ]

Bicyclists are also subject to all the same types of collisions as cars and trucks, without the protection of a metal shell – although generally traveling at lower speeds. These risks can be increased if cyclists violate the rules of the road, such as going the wrong way down a one-way street, failing to stop at a red light, or traveling at night without lights.

Electric bicycles (e-bikes) present the further risk of accidental fire from the overheating of their powerful batteries, especially from lower-quality manufacturers.

== Common injuries ==
Bicycle accidents can result in a range of injuries, with head injuries such as concussions and traumatic brain injuries being among the most serious—especially without a helmet. Upper body injuries like wrist and clavicle fractures are common, as cyclists often extend their arms to break a fall. Lower body injuries may include knee damage or leg fractures, while more severe crashes can cause spinal, chest, or abdominal trauma. Road rash, cuts, and bruises are frequent soft tissue injuries, and facial or dental injuries can also occur, especially in high-impact accidents. Prompt medical attention is important for symptoms like loss of consciousness, severe pain, or difficulty breathing.

== Traffic engineering ==
=== History ===
==== United Kingdom ====
During the mid-20th century, the traffic engineering solutions were sought which eased the passage of traffic through the streets and also protected vulnerable road users. In the 1940s, an influential proponent of this ideology was Herbert Alker Tripp, an assistant commissioner of London's Metropolitan Police. Tripp argued in his book Town Planning and Road Traffic that: "If we could segregate pedestrians completely from the wheeled traffic, we could of course abolish pedestrian casualties".

This philosophy was also pursued by Colin Buchanan; his 1963 report for the UK Government Traffic in Towns, defined future government policy until the end of the century. Buchanan knew that segregation had not been proven to work for cyclists: his 1958 book Mixed Blessing said: "The meagre efforts made to separate cyclists from motor traffic have failed, tracks are inadequate, the problem of treating them at junctions and intersections is completely unsolved, and the attitude of the cyclists themselves to these admittedly unsatisfactory tracks has not been as helpful as it might have been".

Appropriately designed segregated space for cyclists on arterial or interurban routes appears to reduce overall risk. In Ireland, the provision of hard shoulders on interurban routes in the 1970s reportedly resulted in a 50% decrease in accidents. It is reported that the Danes have also found that separate cycle tracks lead to a reduction in rural collisions.

==== The Netherlands ====
The trend away from the bicycle and towards motor cars only began to decrease in the 1970s, when Dutch people took to the streets to protest against the large number of child deaths on the roads: in some years, over 500 children were killed in car accidents in the Netherlands. This protest movement was known as the Stop de Kindermoord (literally "Stop the Child Murder" in Dutch). The success of this movement — along with other factors, such as the oil shortages of 1973–74 — turned Dutch government policy around and the country began to restrict motor vehicles in its towns and cities and to direct its focus on growth towards other forms of transport, with the bicycle perceived as critical in making Dutch streets safer and towns and cities more people-friendly and livable.

Cycling is a common mode of transport in the Netherlands, with 36% of the people listing the bicycle as their most frequent mode of transport on a typical day (Note: Up from 31% naming the bike their main mode of transport for daily activities in 2011.) as opposed to the car (45%) and public transport (11%). Cycling has a modal share of 27% of all trips (urban and rural) nationwide.

This high modal share for bicycle travel is enabled by unusually flat topography, cycling infrastructure such as cycle paths, cycle tracks, protected intersections, bicycle parking and by making cycling routes shorter, quicker and more direct than car routes.

=== Road design ===
==== United States ====
Concern over national public health and active transportation have inspired states and municipalities to rethink present traffic engineering. Following the viral popularity of a video created by video game developer Nick Falbo in February 2014, Dutch-style protected intersections began to gain interest with metropolitan planning organizations. By 2015, Davis, California, Salt Lake City, Utah, and Austin, Texas became the first three U.S. cities to feature protected intersections.

Understanding how to effectively reduce cycling accidents and injuries is in part limited by the lack of comprehensive studies regarding municipal infrastructures and the challenge of controlling for the wide range of risks involved with travel by cycle. Despite these statistical limitations, the risk of cycling accidents has been found to be lowest on segregated on-road bike lanes and routes.Higher risk was associated with cycling on multi-use non-segregated facilities with a lack of any designated cycling infrastructure (i.e. sidewalks, unmarked roads). Major arterial thoroughfares have also been shown to be more dangerous for cyclists than minor roads.

=== Signage ===
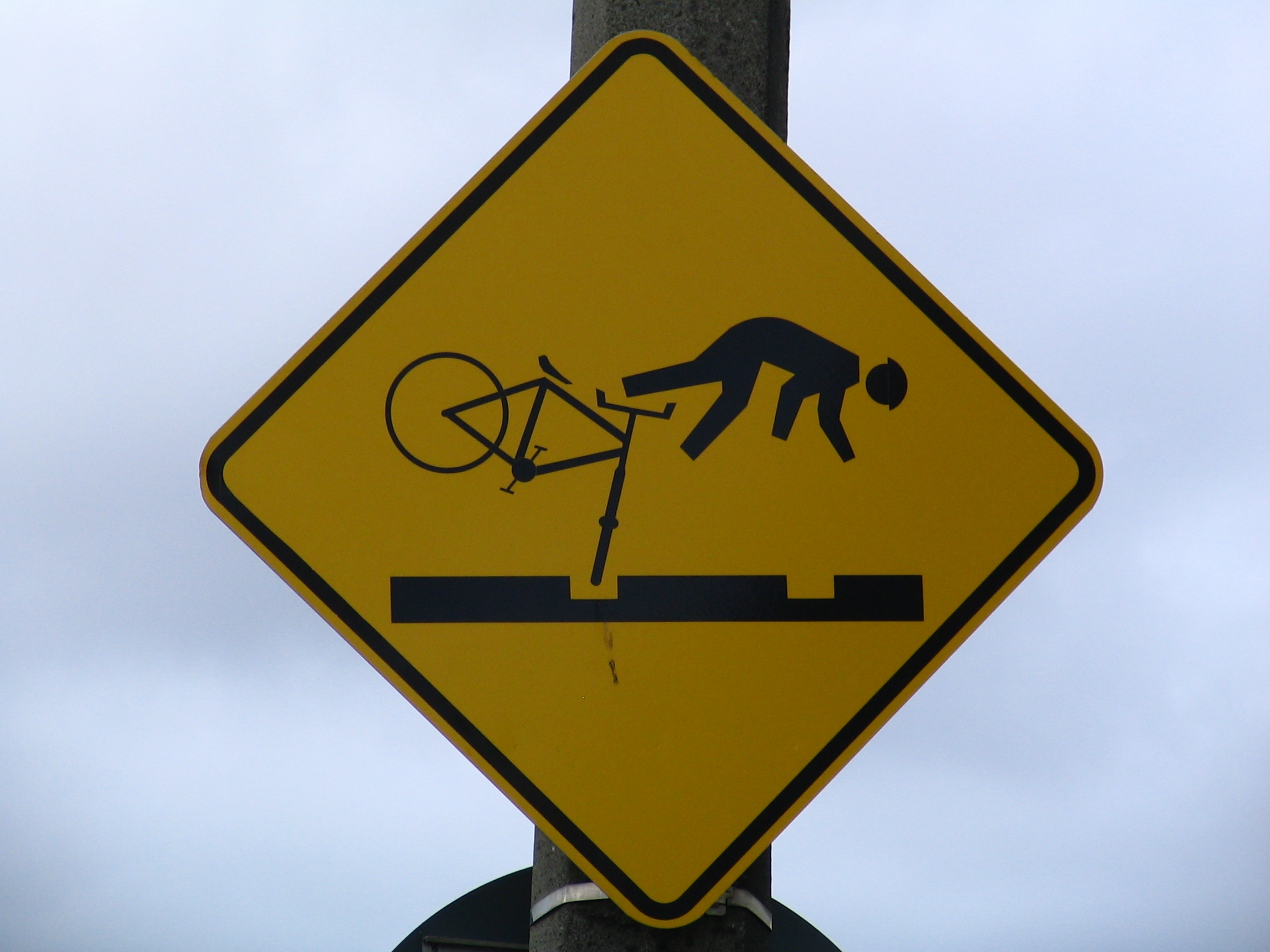
Sign warning cyclists of recessed railway tracks in Dunedin, New Zealand

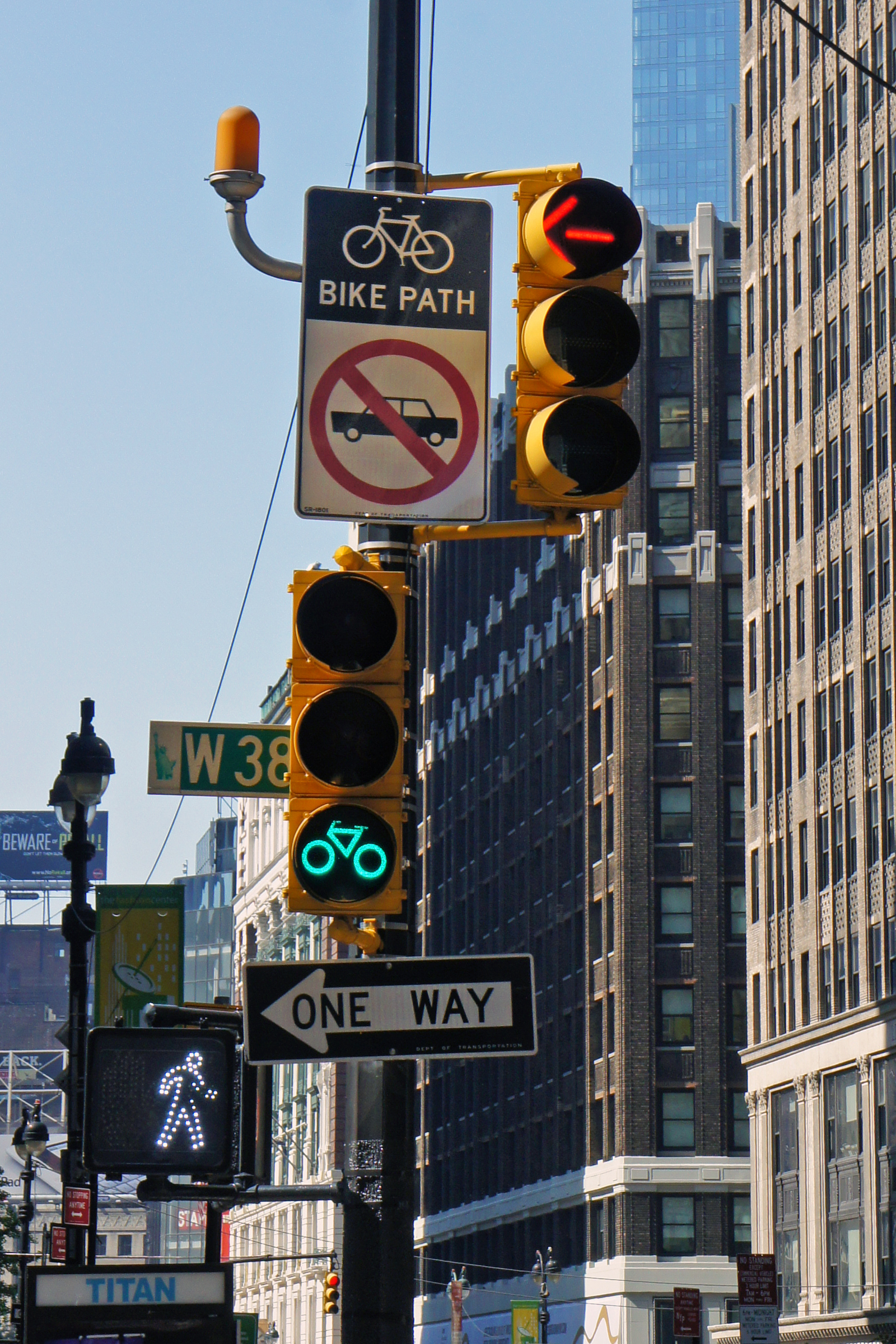
Signs and signals for both bicycles and drivers at an intersection in New York City

==== United Kingdom ====
Following increased pressure from The Times "Cities Fit For Cycling" campaign and from other media in 2012, warning signs are now displayed on the backs of many HGVs. These signs are directed against a common type of accident which occurs when the large vehicle turns left at a junction: a cyclist trying to pass on the nearside can be crushed against the HGV's wheels, especially if the driver cannot see the cyclist. The signs, such as the winning design of the InTANDEM road safety competition launched in March 2012, advocate extra care when passing a large vehicle on the nearside. This type of 'undertaking' has been promoted in UK with the Highway Code revisions in January 2022. The duty of care is now placed on the larger vehicle and they are required to stop and permit the cycle to undertake them (pass on their left) before they turn left. The aim is to reduce the type of 'left turn' tragedies such as happened to Marta Kraweic. However it remains to be seen if it is a positive move to enable undertaking of left turning vehicles rather than promote caution in holding back until the vehicle ahead completes its manoeuvre and in the knowledge of mirror blind spots existing.

==== United States ====
The Federal Highway Administration has developed various bicycle signage for motorists, which have evolved over recent years. Signs and signals designed exclusively for bicycles are occasionally used to denote multiple use paths and bicycle facilities.

=== Minimum passing distance laws ===
Some countries, including the United States, Australia, Japan, Ireland, Germany and Belgium, have laws that requires drivers to leave a minimum passing distance of approximately 1 to 1.5 metres when overtaking a cyclist. The required distance may also vary depending on the applicable speed limit. Failure to comply with these laws may result in fines, licence suspension or demerit point deductions for dangerous driving.

== Safety equipment and strategies ==
=== Helmets ===
Helmet use varies from almost none in some regions to being mandatory for children to being mandatory for all cyclists. Helmets are required in most races. Helmets may help prevent head injuries, but laws that enforce helmet use have also been shown to discourage cycling.

Using retroreflector and Cat-Eye on a bicycle, showing day and night difference

=== Lights ===
Headlights and taillights may be mounted on the bicycle or worn by the cyclist. Bicycle lights can be powered by replaceable batteries, by internal rechargeable batteries, or powered by a hub, bottle or roller dynamo that produces electrical energy when driven by the rotation of the wheels.

Cycling lights are typically of lower power than those on motor vehicles, but well-designed lights are perfectly adequate for the lower speed of bicycles. Some bicycle headlights have beams shaped to light the road. These are also suitably conspicuous to other road users. In order to be effective, lights have to be securely attached to the bicycle and properly aimed, not mounted on soft bags or loose clothing. In the US, state and local ordinances usually require this.

=== Audible signaling ===
Bells or other audible signaling devices are required equipment in many jurisdictions.

=== Time of day ===
Avoiding cycling at or around dusk is a way to reduce the number of serious bike accidents. The majority of fatal car-bike accidents occur between 6pm and 9pm, likely due to the low-light conditions and potential glare of sunset, combined with traffic still being heavier, especially on weekdays.

=== Density ===
A 2024 study found that among US cities with similar populations, those with denser urban cores and higher bicycling rates had lower overall fatality rates for automobiles and pedestrians.

== Safety education ==
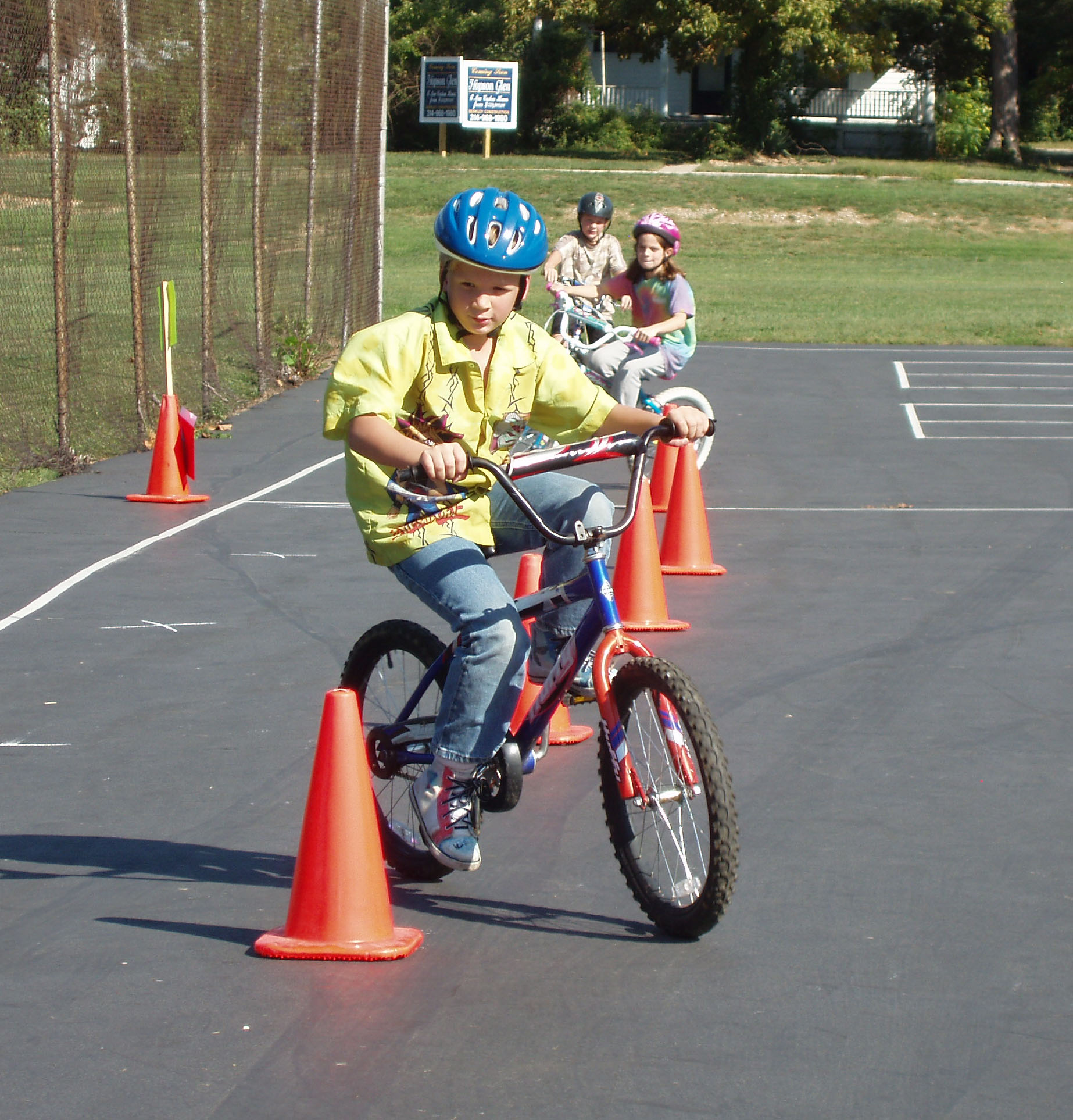
Bike safety rodeo

=== Development ===
==== United Kingdom ====
Primary safety education has advanced significantly through programmes such as Effective Cycling and the development of Britain's new National Standards for cycle training. In addition to technical improvements in brakes, tyres and bicycle construction generally (for example, it is now rare for a chain to snap and throw the rider when accelerating away from a stop) there are well-understood behavioural models which actively manage the risk posed by other road users.

Cycling experts such as the UK's John Franklin emphasise the importance of assertive cycling and good road positioning. Franklin advocates the use of road positions that will give cyclists a good view of the road, will make cyclists visible to other road-users, and will discourage risky behaviour by other road users; he often advocates the use of a centre-of-lane 'primary riding position' when negotiating hazards.

=== Motorist education ===
==== Dutch Reach ====
Various jurisdictions include recommending the Dutch Reach (so named because the practice started in the Netherlands) in driver education materials, to prevent hitting a cyclist with an opening door. For drivers and passengers exiting the left side of the vehicle, this involves opening the left-hand door with the right hand, forcing the person both to open the door more slowly and to turn so that bicycles approaching from behind the car are visible.

==== Florida ====
The Florida Department of Transportation (FDOT), known for its "Arrive Alive" campaign for motorists in the 1970s, has since expanded into active transportation programs such as their recent "Alert Today, Alive Tomorrow" and "Put it Down" (regarding cell phone use) campaigns for pedestrians and cyclists. Additionally, FDOT also supports statewide educational programs offering educational materials and bicycle rodeos, such as the Florida PedBike Resource Center, and the University of Miami BikeSafe Program.

==== Idaho ====
In April 2016, Idaho became the first U.S. state to add questions about bicycle and pedestrian safety to the state driver's license exam and educational materials. The revised exam includes a bank of 11 unique questions, of which a minimum of two are automatically generated within every 40-question DMV test.

== Rural safety ==
Direct rear impacts with cyclists are more likely on arterial/rural roads, and are more likely to kill people on these roads. Data collated by the OECD indicates that rural locations account for 35% or more of cycling fatalities in Denmark, Finland, France, Great Britain, Japan, the Netherlands, and Spain.

== See also ==
- Bikeway safety
- Cycling infrastructure
- Hazards of outdoor recreation
- Motorcycle safety
- Outline of cycling
- Safety in numbers
- Safety of cycling infrastructure
- Vehicular cycling
