= Bicycle safety wing =

Bicycle safety device

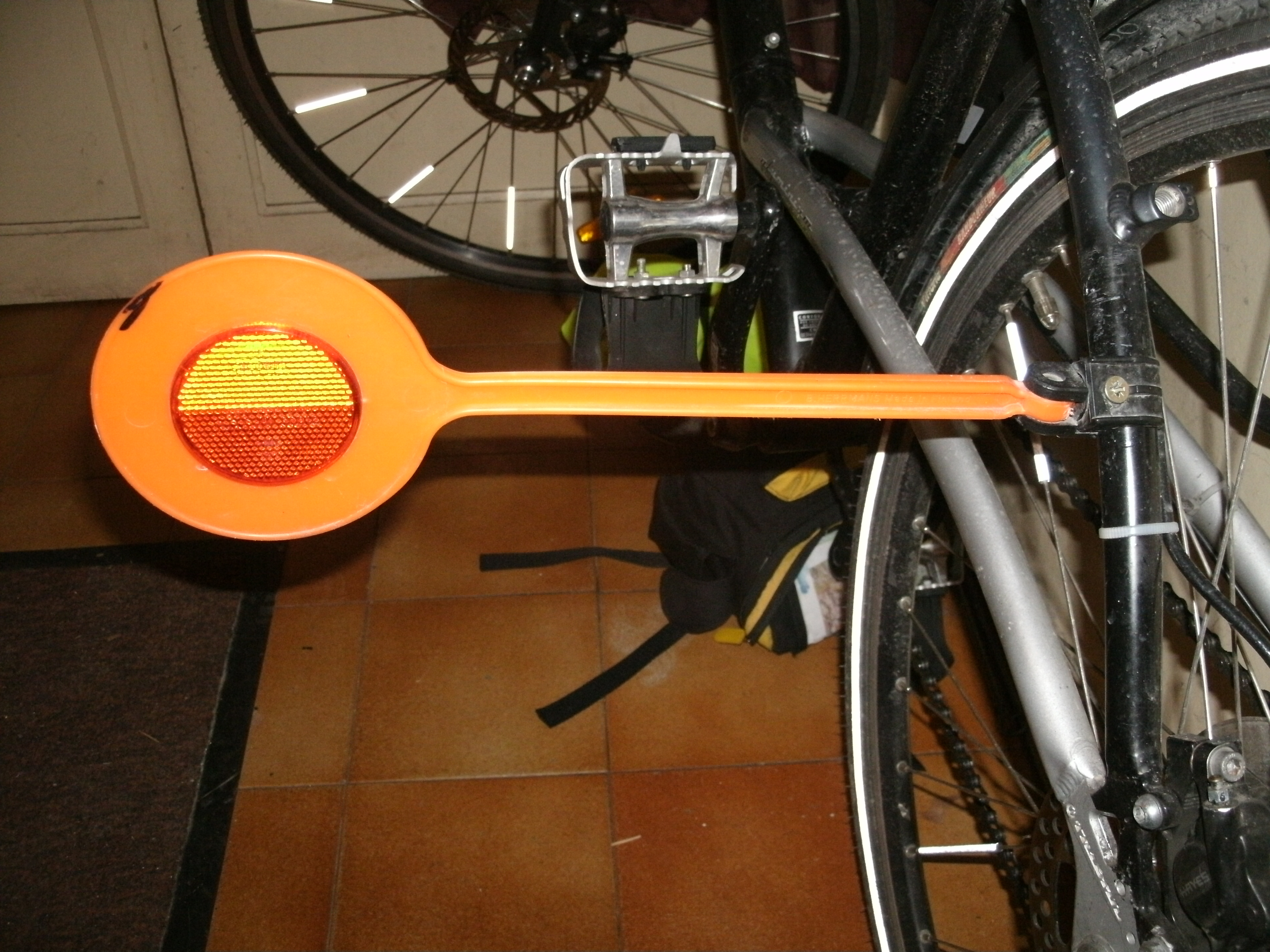
A bicycle safety wing

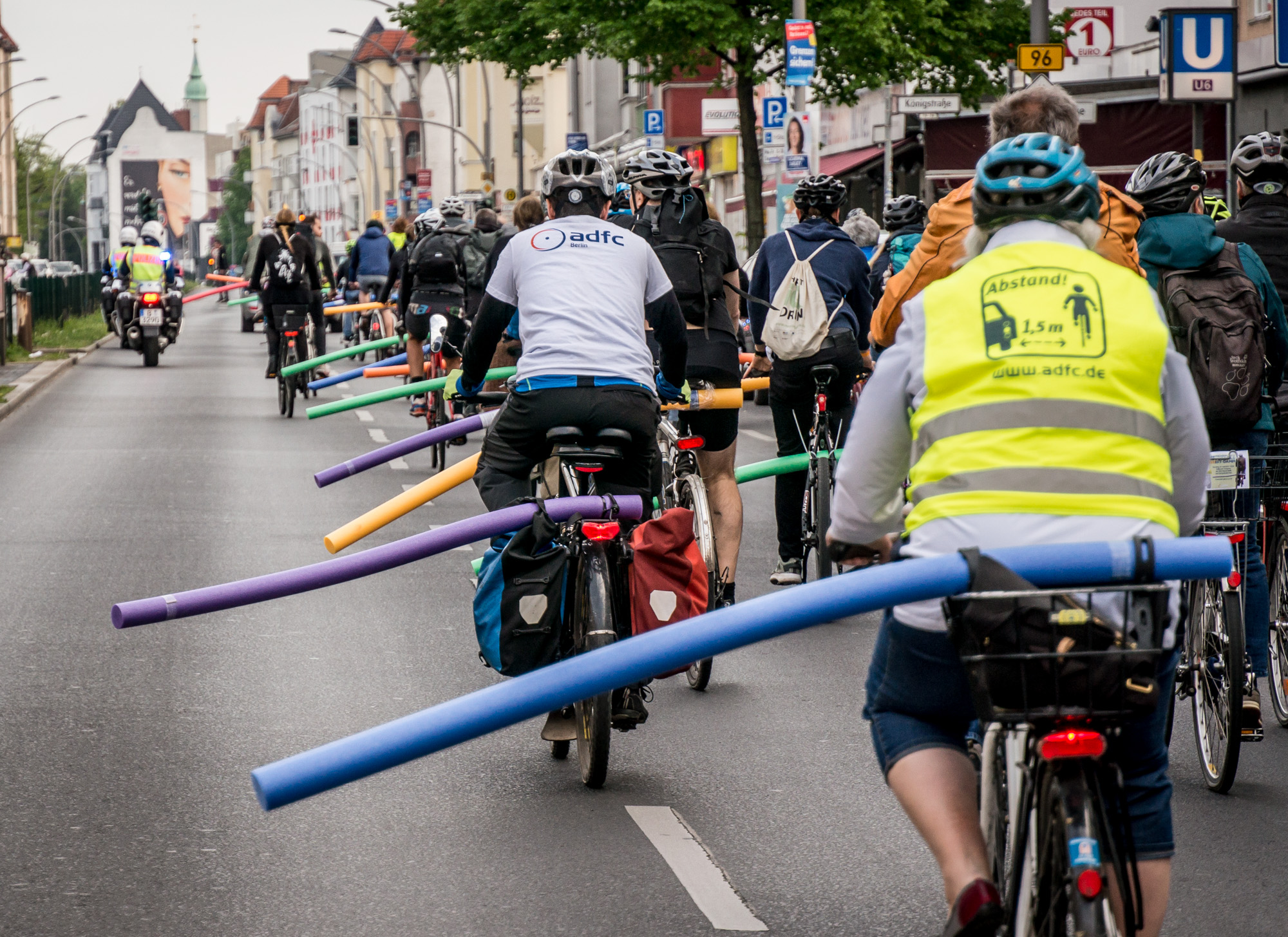
Bicyclists demonstrating a safe overtaking distance with the use of pool noodles as safety wings.

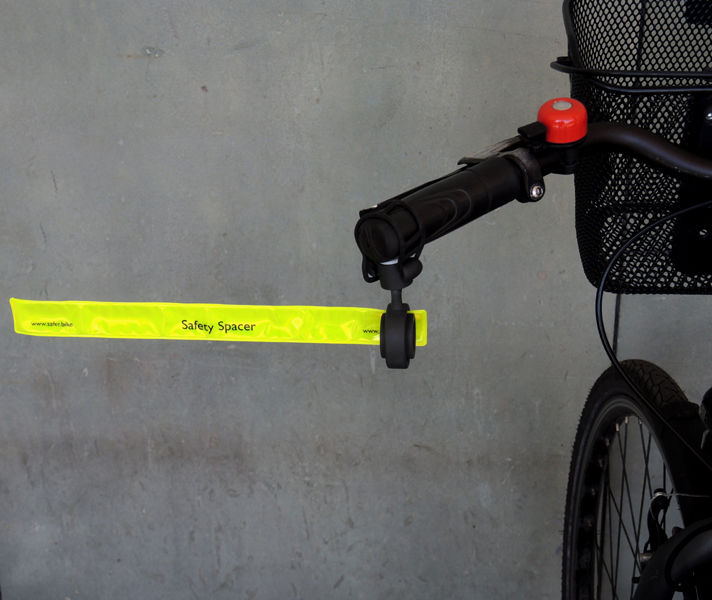
Slap wrap as safety spacer fixed on a handlebar

A bicycle safety wing is an arm attached to the side of a bicycle. Its purpose is to keep other vehicles from passing too closely. It is usually made of brightly colored plastic, and ends with a retroreflector.

== Legality ==
French law allows for bicycle safety wings up to 40 centimetres.

== See also ==
- Bicycle-friendly
- Bicycle helmet laws by country
- Bicycle safety
- Outline of cycling
- Safety in numbers
- Vehicular cycling
