= Black Label Bike Club =

International cycling club

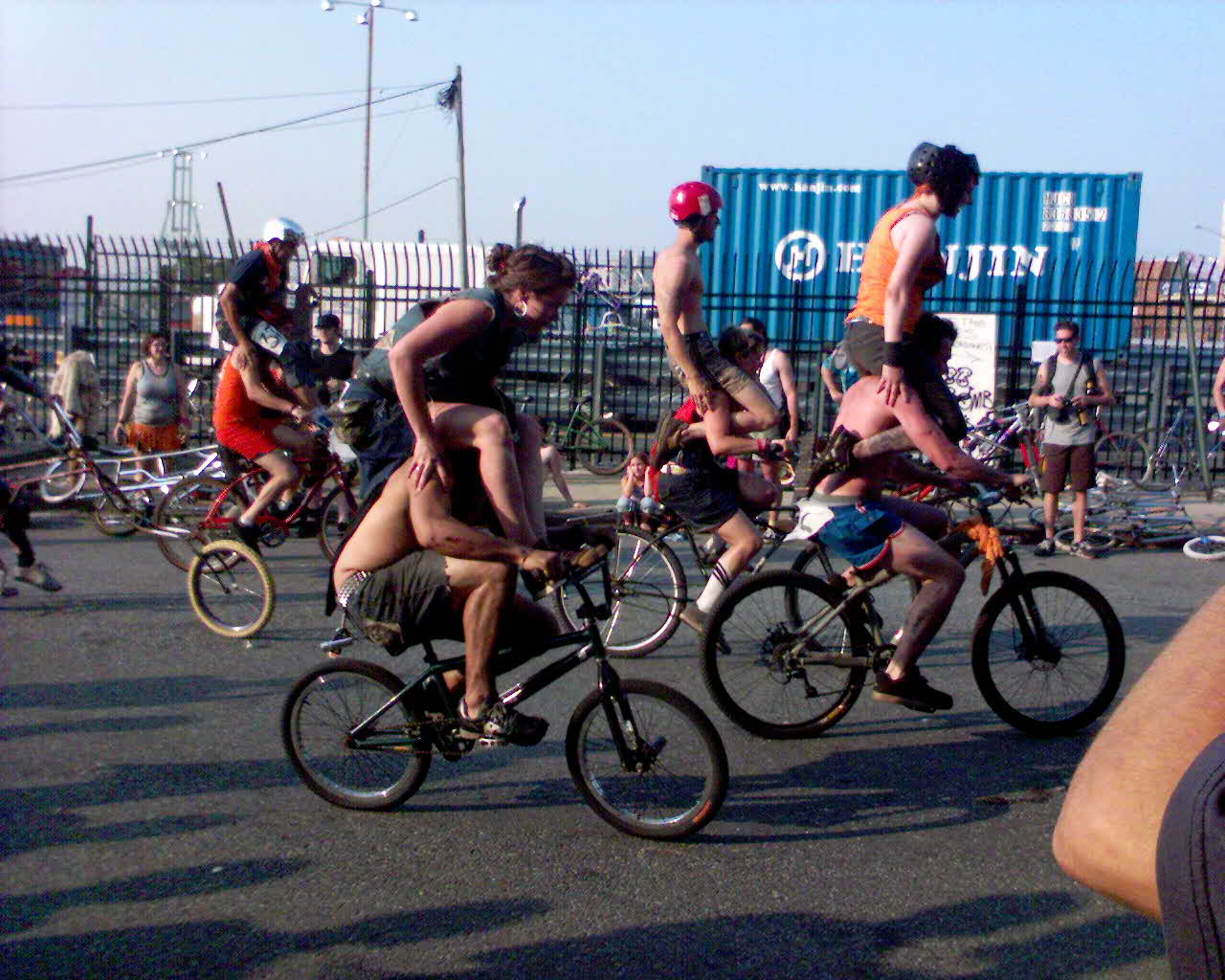
Attendees of Black Label Bicycle Club's annual event Bike Kill participate in the chicken race

The Black Label Bike Club (BLBC) is an international freak/mutant bicycle organization specializing in tall bikes and choppers. It is known for organizing the annual Bike Kill event.

== History ==
BLBC was founded in 1992 as the country's first "outlaw bike club" by Jacob Houle and Per Hanson, under the name "Hard Times Bike Club", in Minneapolis, Minnesota. Inspired by Victorians who used tall bikes, called lamplighters, to light the streetlamps, BLBC are credited as the originators of tall bike jousting, and one of the main contributors to the rise of the tall bike culture. The club has since grown to include chapters in New York City, San Francisco, Reno, Nevada, Austin, Texas, Oakland, California, New Orleans, Louisiana, Tokyo, and also includes a nomad chapter known as "Nowhere".

== Bike Kill ==
Bike Kill is a long-running BLBC Halloween tradition in Brooklyn, held yearly on the last Saturday in October since 2003. It operates in the form of a block party that celebrates various mutant bikes built by BLBC members, including tall bikes, "short-tall" bikes, tiny bikes, wooden bikes, lowriders, and other unique designs. It is often held in different spots each year, with the location not being publicized, instead spreading through word of mouth. The 2020 event was canceled due to the COVID-19 pandemic.

== Media ==
The New York chapter was featured in a full-length film titled B.I.K.E., produced by Fountainhead Films in 2006. The film was directed by Anthony Howard and Jacob Septimus, who spent over two years following the club by going to their parties in New York and Minneapolis, as well as the protests of the 2004 Republican National Convention.

In 2018, photographer Julie Glassberg published a photography book documenting the Black Label Bike Club's New York chapter, which she titled Bike Kill.
