= C.h.u.n.k. 666 =

American tall-bike club

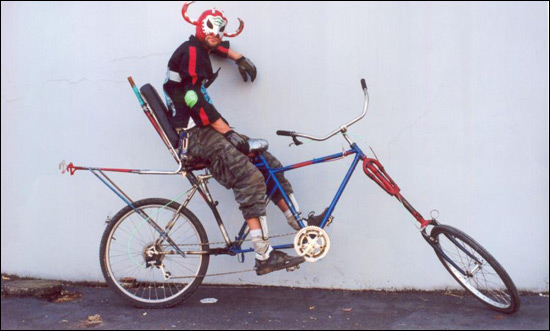
C.h.u.n.k. 666 rider and bike.

C.H.U.N.K. 666 (or CHUNK 666, C.H.V.N.K. DCLXVI) is a tall bike and chopper bicycle club based in Portland, Oregon and Brooklyn, New York. They formed in the early 1990s and were active into the 2000s.

The activities of C.H.U.N.K. 666 include building tall bikes, riding said bikes at events like Critical Mass, making zines and organizing the annual Chunkathlon festival. The bicycles are home-made using salvaged bicycle parts and a variety of methods, including welding; they are described as "bikes that have 9-foot (2.7 m)-long forks and are built to come apart after 3½ miles, or are 9 feet (2.7 m) tall, or lean back so far that it doesn't look sane - let alone safe - to ride".

C.H.U.N.K. 666 holds workshops on how to make tall bikes, such as at Bike Summer 2002 and hosts bike-building workshops for children.

C.H.U.N.K. 666 held Chunkathlons, public tournaments featuring competitions for modified bicycle riders, from 2002 through 2006. Events included tall bike jousting, derbies, baby rescuing simulations, and historical re-enactments. In 2003 Chunkathlons were held in Portland, Oregon and Williamsburg, Brooklyn.

They launched "Aquachopper Expeditions" from 2004 through 2012, which involved constructing amphibious human powered vehicles, riding them to and across the Willamette River, and camping overnight on Ross Island in Portland, Oregon.
