= Chopper bicycle =

Customised bicycle stylistically modelled after the motorcycle

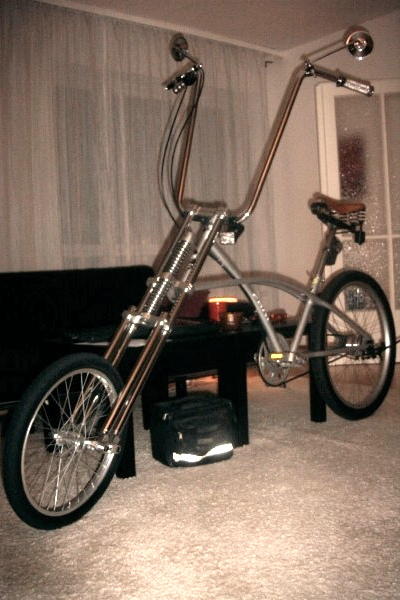
A chopper bicycle

A chopper bicycle is a highly customized bicycle whose design, construction and style is similar to that of a chopper-style motorcycle.

== About ==
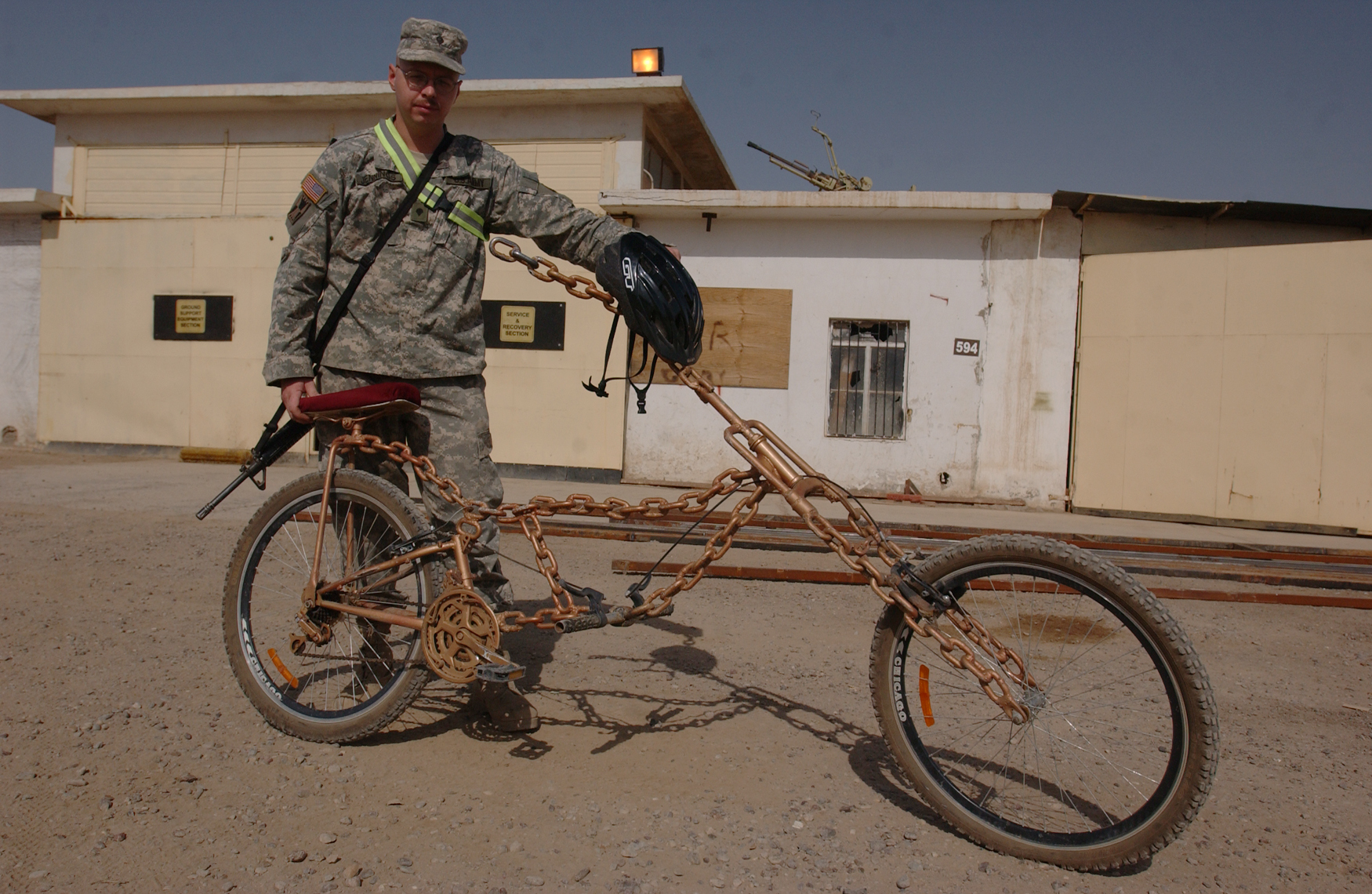
A custom build Chopper bicycle

While the term "chopper" is generally used to describe a motorcycle or bicycle that has had some of its original parts replaced with custom parts, today's definition has grown to include custom motorcycles and bicycles that are low to the ground, usually with extended forks creating a long front end. Even as commercial interests are taking note of the popularity of choppers and expanding their lines, most riders of choppers have hand built choppers and encourage others to make their own. Arguably, a bought 'chopper' is not a 'chopper' at all because no chopping was done, only a commercial transaction.

There are various cycling groups and clubs around the world that feature chopper bicycle riders, such as the SCUL and C.h.u.n.k. 666. Such groups encourage all chopper bicycle riders to join them on rides celebrating different events and holidays.

== See also ==
- List of bicycle types
- Outline of cycling
- Raleigh Chopper
- Wheelie bike
