= Cycling infrastructure =

Facilities for use by cyclists

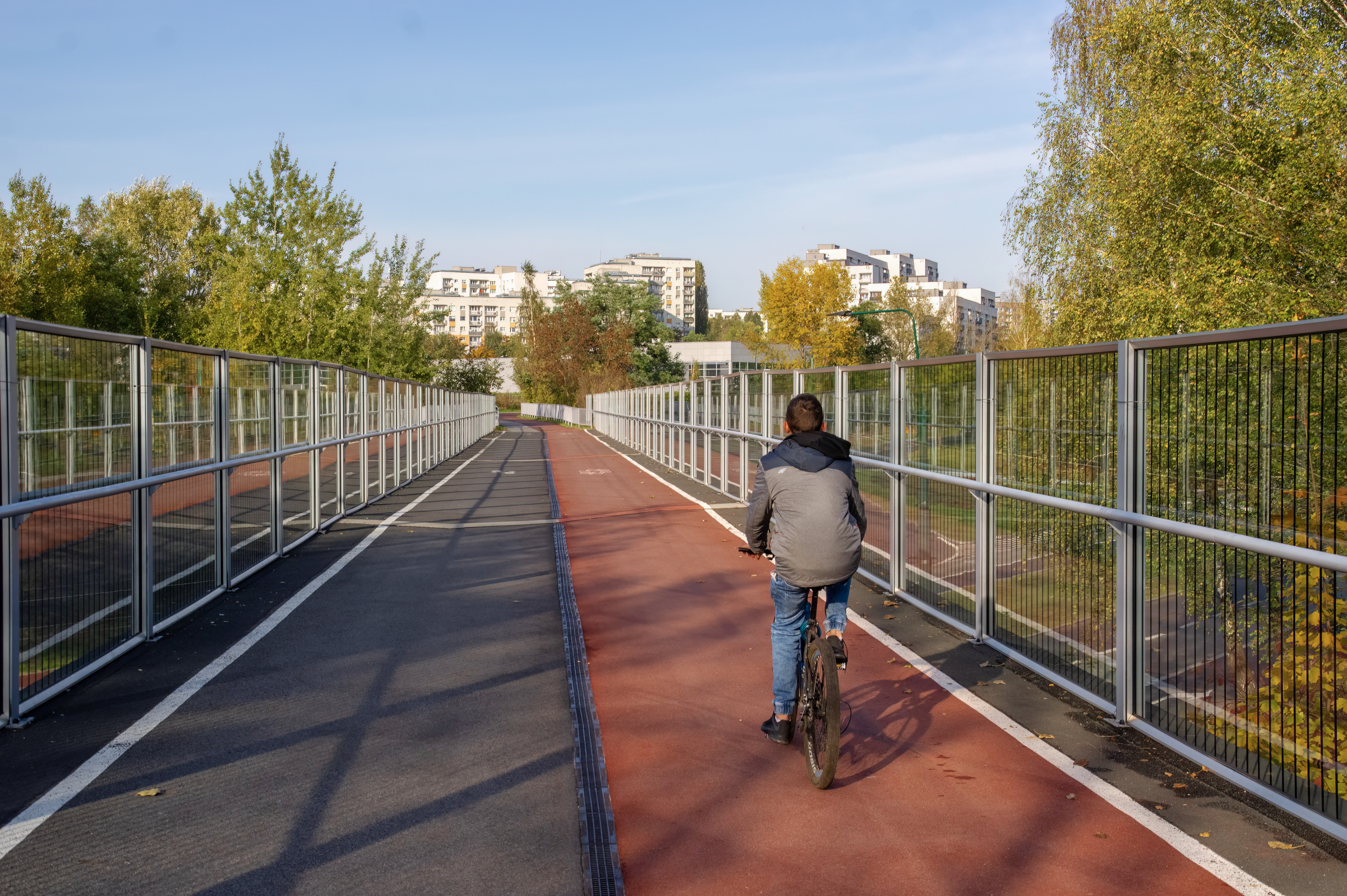
A bicycle bridge in Sosnowiec, Poland

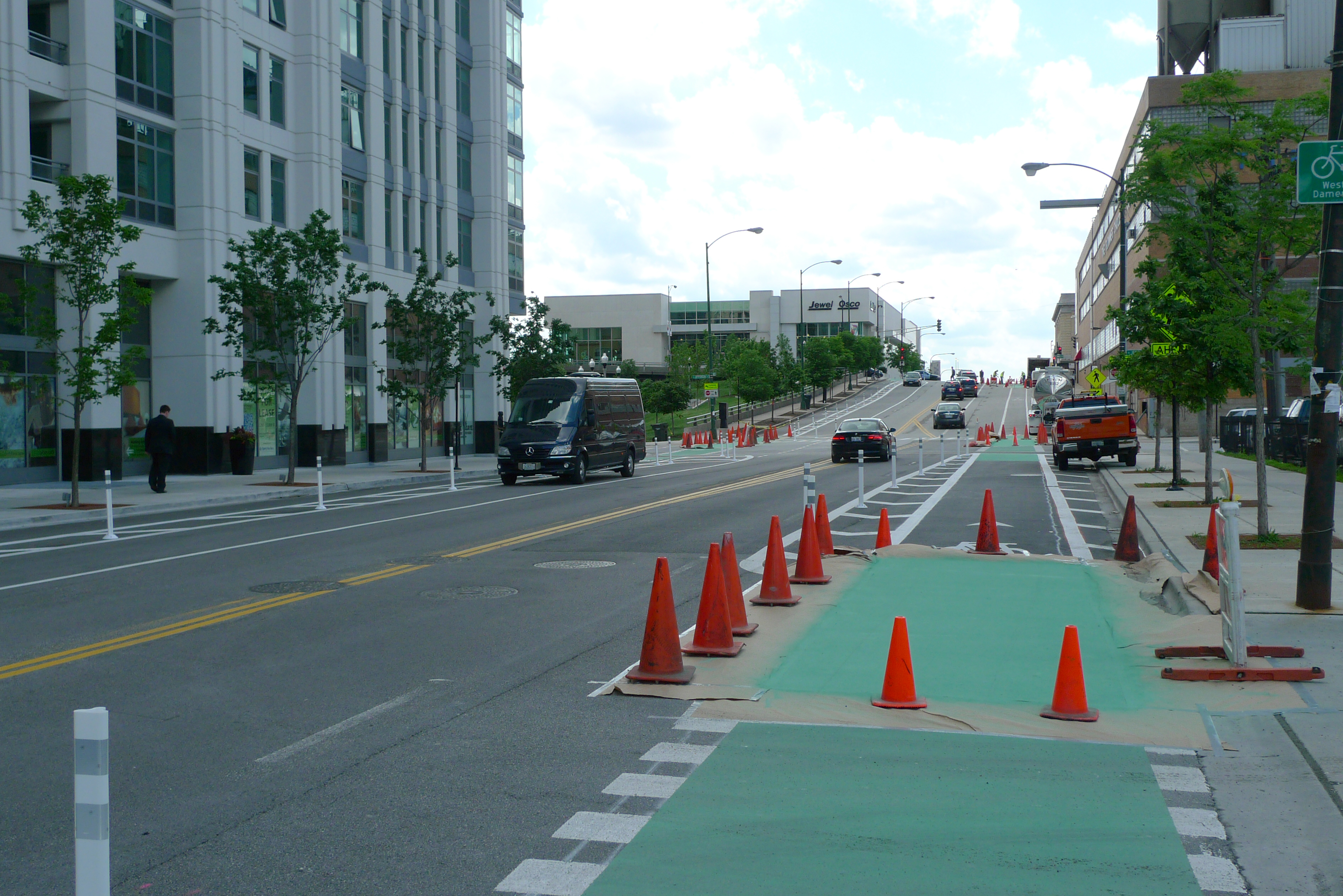
Pop-up cycling infrastructure being placed in Chicago, Illinois

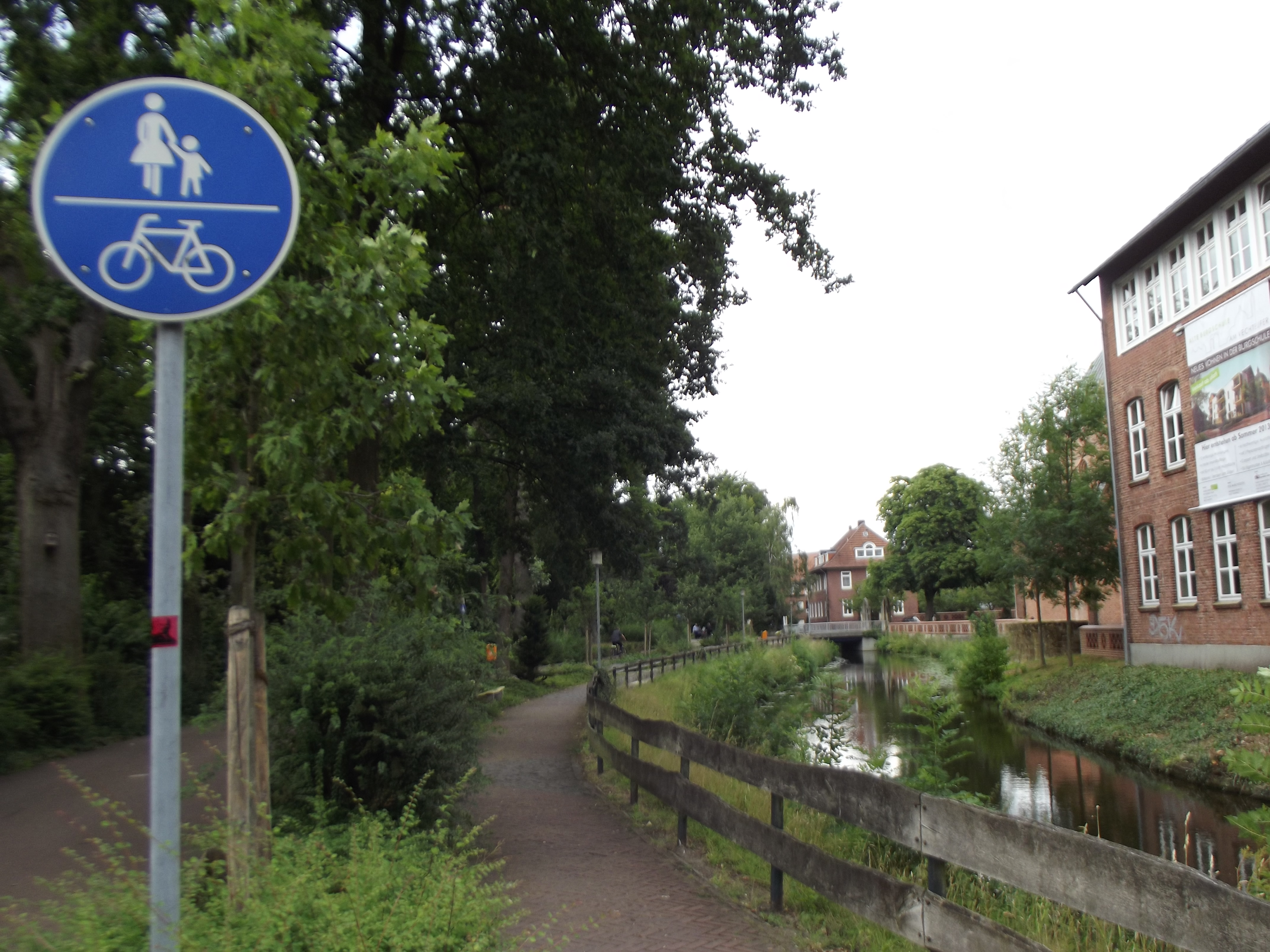
Signposted greenway, bordering on a gracht in Nordhorn, Germany. The sign indicates that it is a shared-use path, restricted to cyclists and pedestrians.

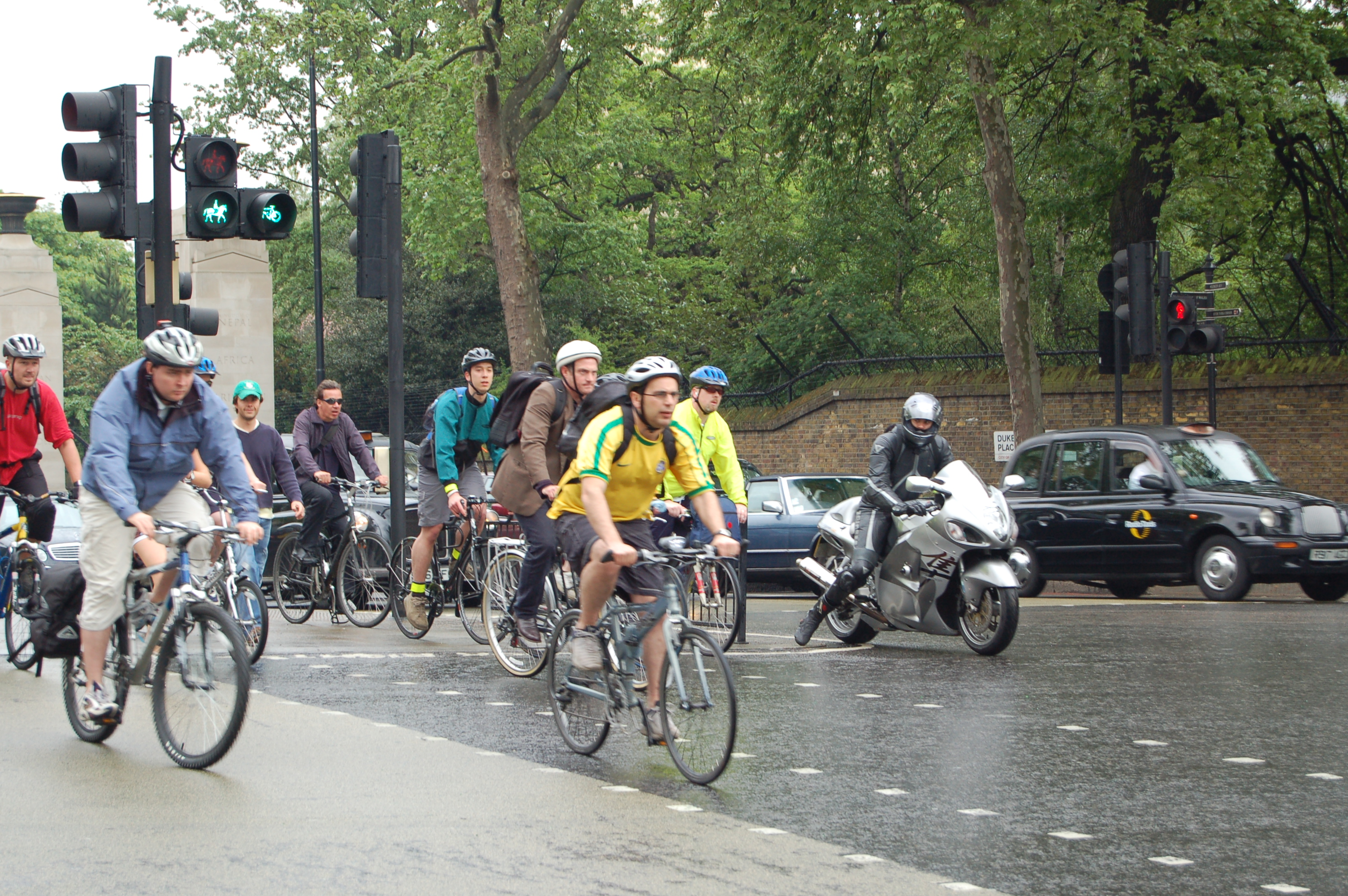
Cyclists use a segregated cut through of a busy interchange in London at rush hour.

Cycling infrastructure is all infrastructure that cyclists are permitted to use. These include bike paths, bike lanes, cycle tracks, rail trails, shared-use paths and, where (exceptionally and explicitly) permitted, sidewalks. Roads used by motorists are also cycling infrastructure except for roads (such as freeways/motorways) that cyclists are explicitly forbidden to use. In addition to these routes, the concept also includes amenities such as bike racks for parking, shelters, service centers and specialized traffic signs and signals. The more cycling infrastructure there is, the more people travel by bicycle.

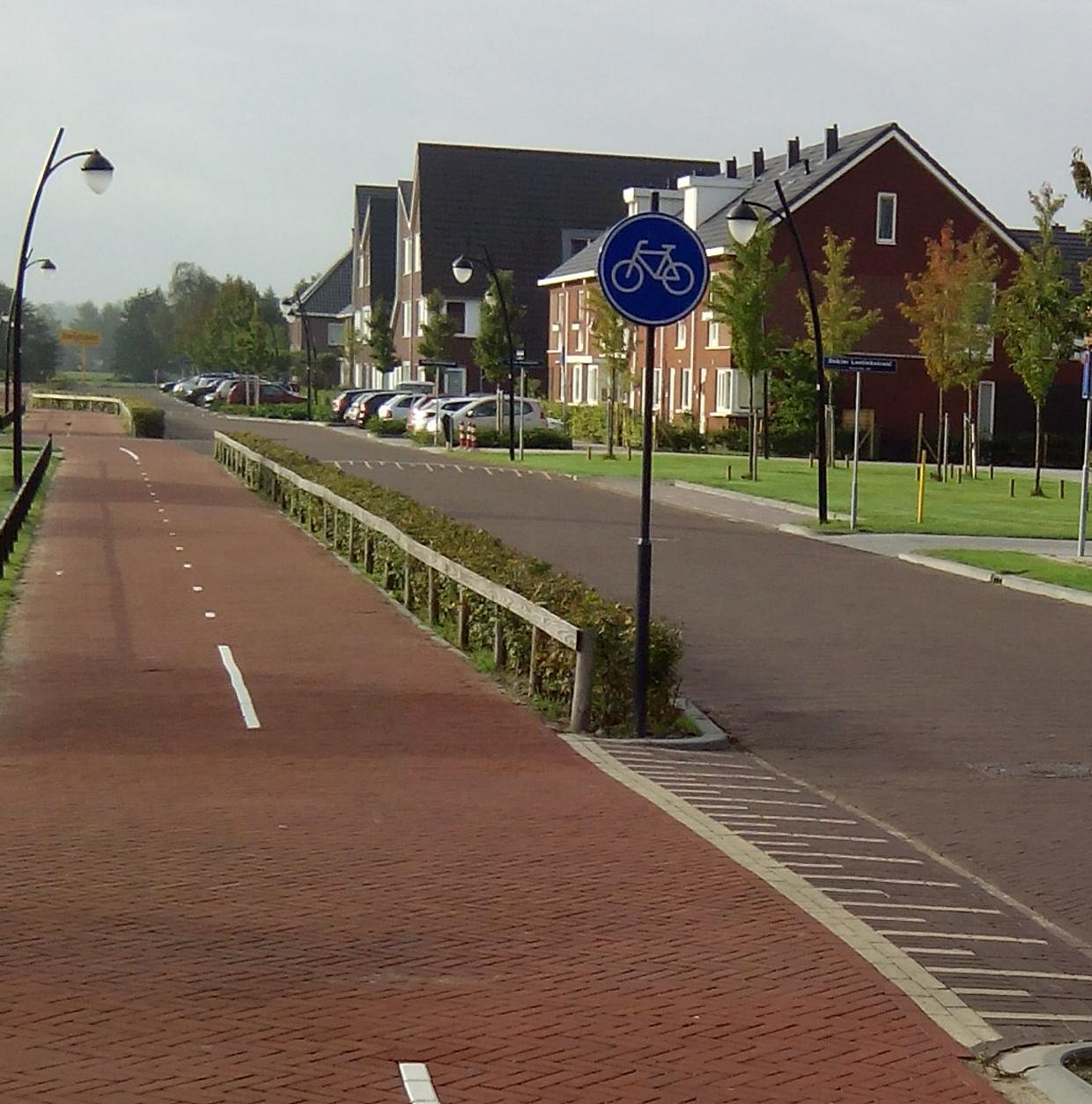
This fietspad (bicycle path) is in the Netherlands safely linking housing with decent street lights.

Good road design, road maintenance and traffic management can make cycling safer and more useful.

The placement of cycling infrastructure and bicycle parking in bus stops and train stations increases the accessibility of such locations to people and has been found to lead to an increase in the number of passengers using public transportation from those stops with this additional infrastructure.

== History ==
The history of cycling infrastructure starts from shortly after the bike boom of the 1880s when the first short stretches of dedicated bicycle infrastructure were built, through to the rise of the automobile from the mid-20th century onwards and the concomitant decline of cycling as a means of transport, to cycling's comeback from the 1970s onwards.

== Bikeways ==
Protected intersection design based on a common Dutch model, preserving the physical segregation of the cycle lane throughout the intersection

A bikeway (US) or cycleway (UK) is a lane, route, way or path which in some manner is specifically designed and/or designated for bicycle travel. Bike lanes demarcated by a painted marking are quite common in many cities. Cycle tracks demarcated by barriers, bollards or boulevards are quite common in some European countries such as the Netherlands, Denmark and Germany. They are also increasingly common in major cities elsewhere, such as New York, Melbourne, Ottawa, Vancouver and San Francisco. Montreal and Davis, California, which have had segregated cycling facilities with barriers for several decades, are among the earliest examples in North America.

Various guides exist to define the different types of bikeway infrastructure, including UK Department for Transport manual The Geometric Design of Pedestrian, Cycle and Equestrian Routes, Sustrans Design Manual, UK Department of Transport Local Transport Note 2/08: Cycle Infrastructure Design, the Danish Road Authority guide Registration and classification of paths, the Dutch CROW, the American Association of State Highway and Transportation Officials (AASHTO) Guide to Bikeway Facilities, the Federal Highway Administration (FHWA) Manual on Uniform Traffic Control Devices (MUTCD), and the US National Association of City Transportation Officials (NACTO) Urban Bikeway Design Guide.

In the Netherlands, the Tekenen voor de fiets design manual recommends a width of at least 2 meters, or 2.5 metres if used by more than 150 bicycles per hour. A minimum width of 2 meters is specified by the cities of Utrecht and 's-Hertogenbosch for new cycle lanes. The Netherlands also has protected intersections to cyclists crossing roads.

=== Terms ===
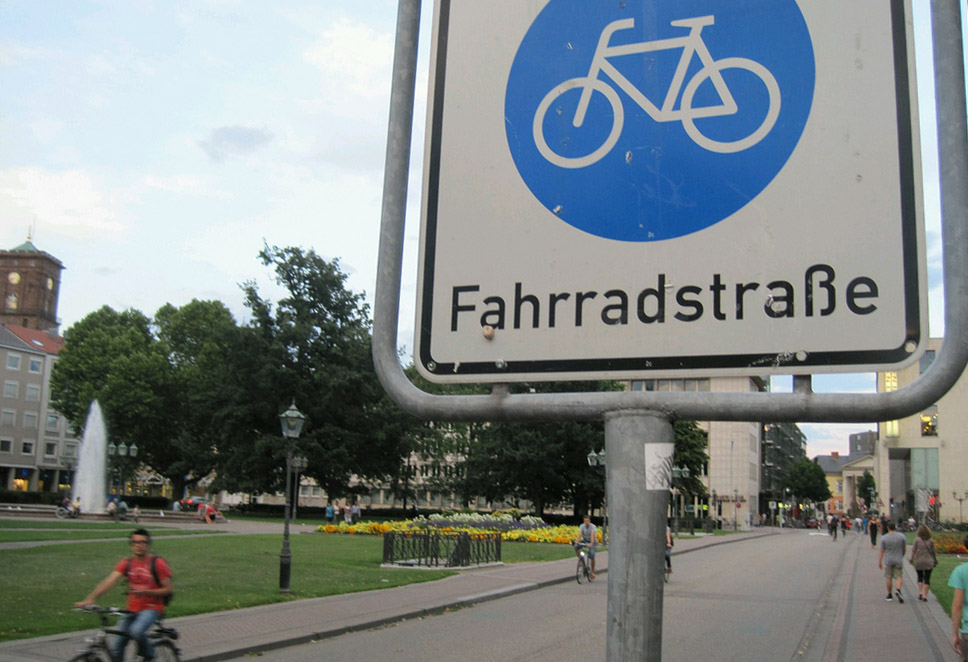
Segregated cycle facility in Karlsruhe, Germany. Fahrradstraße means "bicycle street".

Some bikeways are separated from motor traffic by physical constraints (e.g. barriers, parking or bollards)—bicycle trail, cycle track—but others are partially separated only by painted markings—bike lane, buffered bike lane, and contraflow bike lane. Some share the roadway with motor vehicles—bicycle boulevard, sharrow, advisory bike lane—or shared with pedestrians—shared use paths and greenways.

==== Segregation ====
The term bikeway is largely used in North America to describe all routes that have been designed or updated to encourage more cycling or make cycling safer. In some jurisdictions such as the United Kingdom, segregated cycling facility is sometimes preferred to describe cycling infrastructure which has varying degrees of separation from motorized traffic, or which has excluded pedestrian traffic in the case of exclusive bike paths.

There is no single usage of segregation; in some cases it can mean the exclusion of motor vehicles and in other cases the exclusion of pedestrians as well. Thus, it includes bike lanes with solid painted lines but not lanes with dotted lines, and advisory bike lanes where motor vehicles are allowed to encroach on the lane. It includes cycle tracks as physically distinct from the roadway and sidewalk (e.g. barriers, parking or bollards). And it includes bike paths in their own right of way exclusive to cycling. Paths which are shared with pedestrians and other non-motorized traffic are not considered segregated and are typically called shared use path, multi-use path in North America and shared-use footway in the UK.

=== Safety ===
On major roads, segregated cycle tracks lead to safety improvements compared with cycling in traffic. There are concerns over the safety of cycle tracks and lanes at junctions due to collisions between turning motorists and cyclists, particularly where cycle tracks are two-way. The safety of cycle tracks at junctions can be improved with designs such as cycle path deflection (between 2 m and 5 m) and protected intersections. At multi-lane roundabouts, safety for cyclists is compromised. The installation of separated cycle tracks has been shown to improve safety at roundabouts. A Cochrane review of published evidence found that there was limited evidence to conclude whether cycling infrastructure improves cyclist safety.

=== Legislation ===
Different countries have different ways to legally define and enforce bikeways.

=== Bikeway controversies ===
Some detractors argue that one must be careful in interpreting the operation of dedicated or segregated bikeways/cycle facilities across different designs and contexts; what works for the Netherlands will not necessarily work elsewhere, or claiming that bikeways increase urban air pollution.

Other transportation planners consider an incremental, piecemeal approach to bike infrastructure buildout ineffective and advocate for complete networks to be built in a single phase.

Proponents point out that cycling infrastructure including dedicated bike lanes has been implemented in many cities; when well-designed and well-implemented they are popular and safe, and they are effective at relieving both congestion and air pollution.

=== Bikeway selection ===
Jurisdictions have guidelines around the selection of the right bikeway treatments in order to make routes more comfortable and safer for cycling.

A study reviewing the safety of "road diets" (motor traffic lane restrictions) for bike lanes found in summary that crash frequencies at road diets in the period after installation were 6% lower, road diets do not affect crash severity, or result in a significant change in crash types. This research was conducted by looking at areas scheduled for conversion before and after the road diet was performed, while also comparing similar areas that had not received any changes. It is noted that further research is recommended to confirm findings.

== Bikeway types ==
Bikeways can fall into these main categories: separated in-roadway bikeways such as bike lanes and buffered bike lanes; physically separated in-roadway bikeways such as cycle tracks; right-of-way paths such as bike paths and shared use paths; and shared in-roadway bikeways such as bike boulevards, shared lane markings, and advisory bike lanes. The exact categorization changes depending on the jurisdiction and organization, while many just list the types by their commonly used names

=== Dedicated bikeways ===
Table of separated and in-road bikeways
Type	Variant	Description	Image
Cycle lane (aka bike lane)	Advisory	A bike lane which other users are permitted to use, for example to park or pass other vehicles.	Advisory bike lane as implemented in Netherlands. Seen in Ouddorp in Alkmaar, North Holland.
Cycle lane (aka bike lane)	Mandatory	A bike lane for the exclusive use of cyclists, marked by a solid line in most places.	A bike lane in Providence, Rhode Island
Cycle lane (aka bike lane)	Buffered	A bike lane with some form of buffer between motor traffic and the cycle lane.	Buffered bike lane in Manhattan, New York
Cycle lane (aka bike lane)	Lightly segregated	A bike lane with separating features such as wands or orcas.	Light segregation on a cycle lane in Berlin
Cycle lane (aka bike lane)	Contraflow	A bike lane which allows cyclists to go against the flow of a one-way street.	A contraflow lane in Łódź, Poland
Cycle track (aka bike track)		A physically separated part of the highway dedicated for cycling which typically excludes all motorized traffic with some sort of vertical barrier	A cycle track in the Netherlands
Cycle path (aka bike path or bike trail)		A path dedicated for cycling which is remote from a public highway.	A cycle path next to a guided busway
Shared use path (aka multi-use path)	Shared	A path dedicated for both pedestrians and cycling with the whole path shared. This includes greenways, which are trails along a strip of undeveloped land, in an urban area, set aside for recreational use or environmental protection. Greenways are frequently created out of disused railways, canal towpaths, utility or similar rights of way, or derelict industrial land. Greenways can also be linear parks, and can serve as wildlife corridors.	Former railway line transformed into a shared use path in England
Shared use path (aka multi-use path)	Segregated	A path dedicated for both pedestrians and cycling, split into a walking and cycling section, typically by a painted line (or other feature).	A segregated cycle path
Road shoulder		A reserved lane on the verge of a roadway that is often used by bicyclists and also serves as an emergency stopping lane for motor vehicles.	A road shoulder indicating that it can also be used by cyclists

=== Sharing with motor traffic ===
Cyclists are legally allowed to travel on many roadways in accordance with the rules of the road for drivers of vehicles.

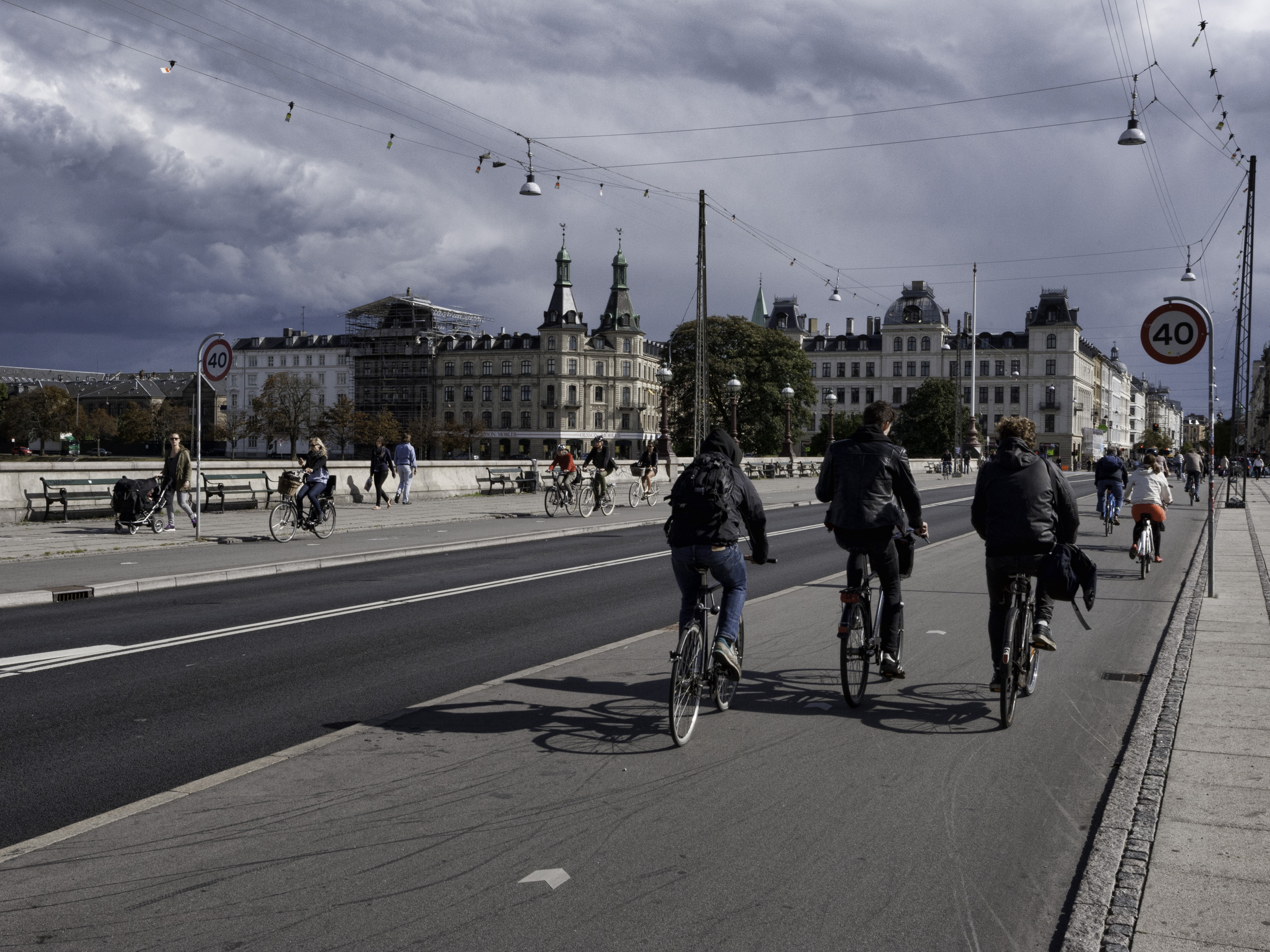
Generously broad separated bike lanes on Dronning Louises Bro in Copenhagen, Denmark. Normally filled with bicycles, as it has been the busiest stretch of bicycle lane in the world. The title has been taken over by Knippelsbro, another bridge in Copenhagen.

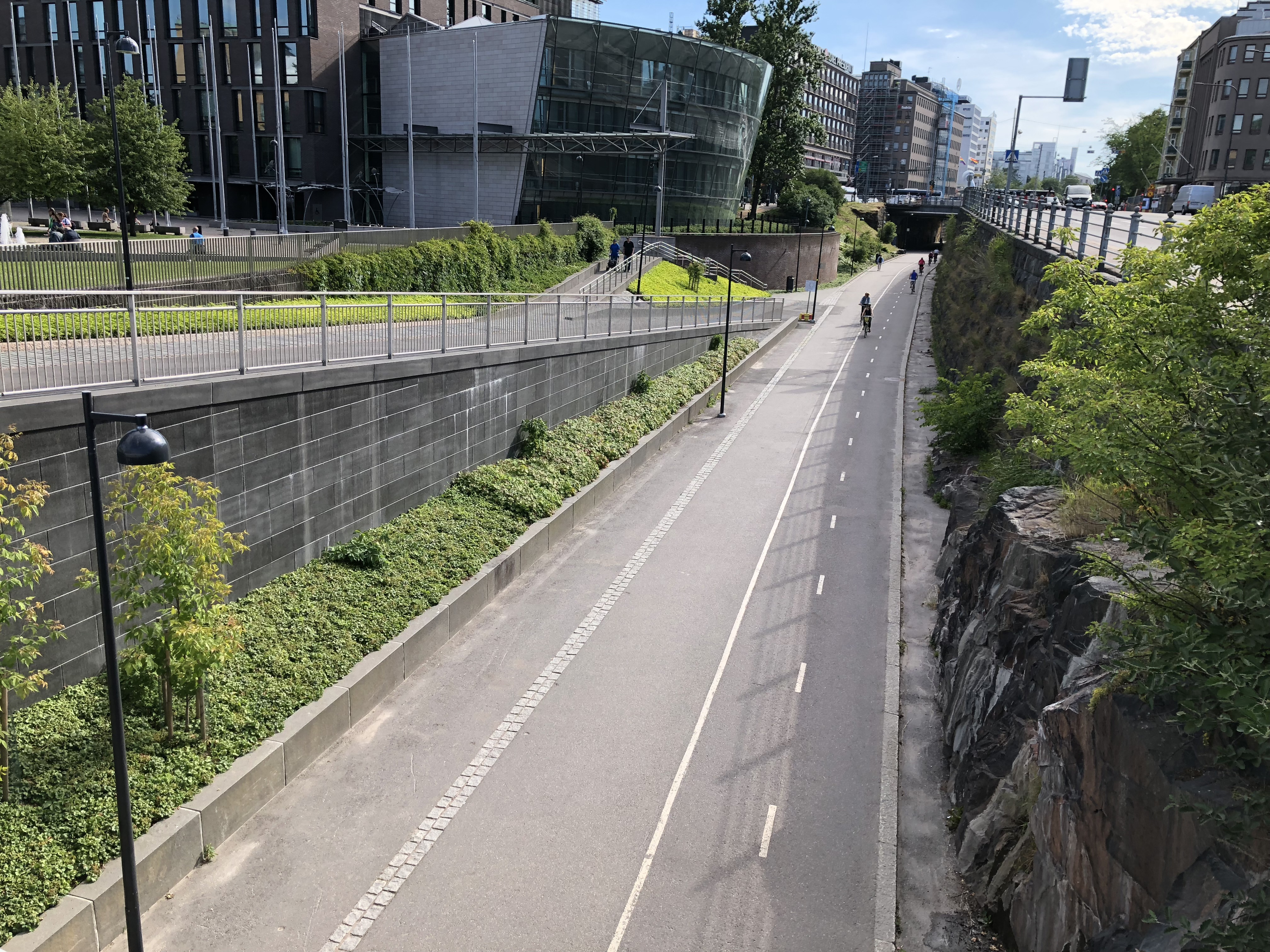
Baana, a 1.3 kilometres (0.81 mi) long pedestrian and cycling path in the center of Helsinki, Finland

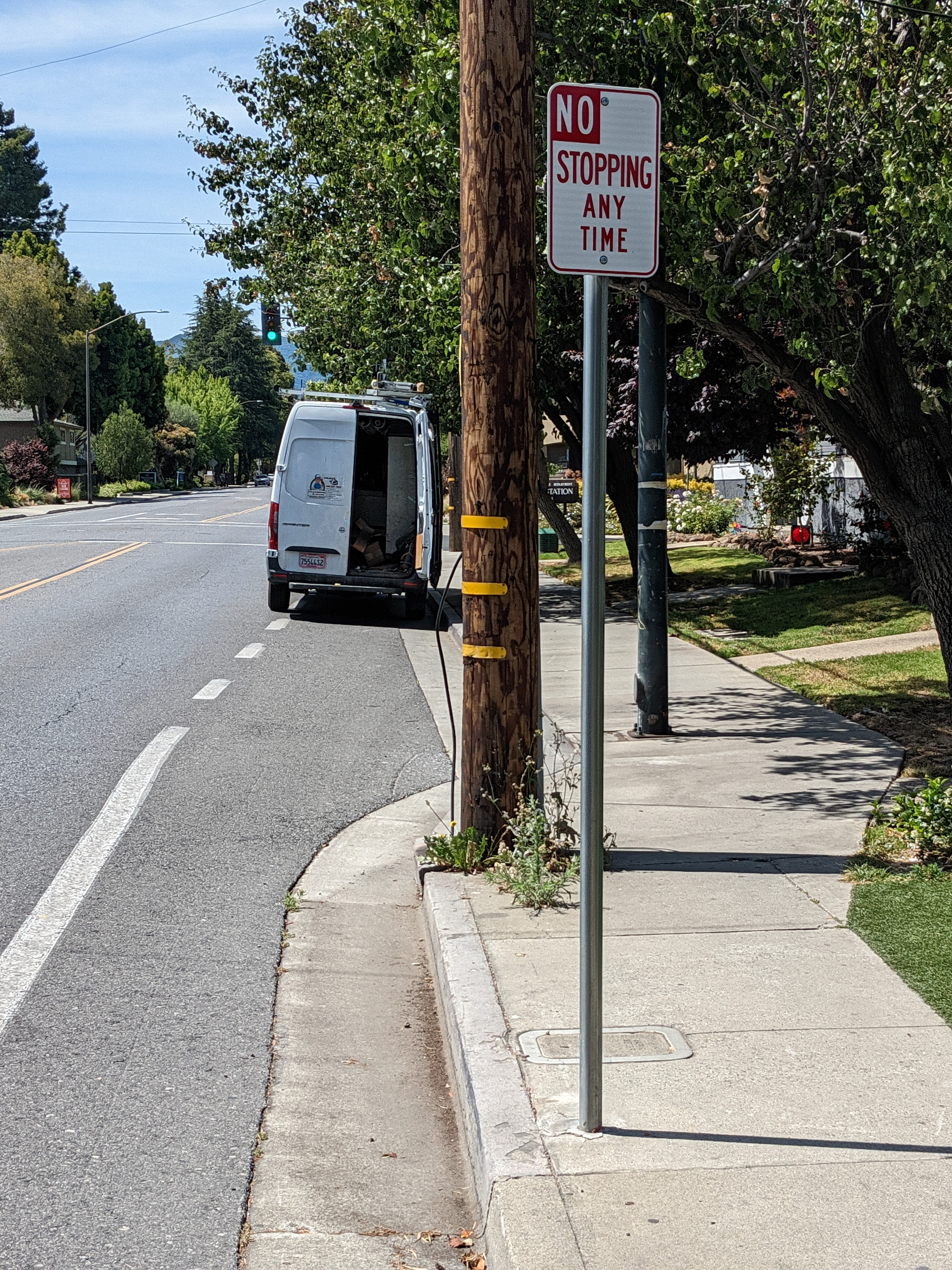
An unprotected bike lane in Campbell, California being blocked by a delivery van

A bicycle boulevard or cycle street is a low speed street which has been optimized for bicycle traffic. Bicycle boulevards discourage cut-through motor vehicle traffic but allow local motor vehicle traffic. They are designed to give priority to cyclists as through-going traffic.

A shared lane marking, also known as a sharrow, is a street marking that indicates the preferred lateral position for cyclists (to avoid the door zone and other obstacles) where dedicated bike lanes are not available.

A 2-1 road is a roadway striping configuration which provides for two-way motor vehicle and bicycle traffic using a central vehicular travel lane and "advisory" bike lanes on either side. The center lane is dedicated to, and shared by, motorists traveling in both directions. The center lane is narrower than two vehicular travel lanes and has no centerline; some are narrower than the width of a car. Cyclists are given preference in the bike lanes but motorists can encroach into the bike lanes to pass other motor vehicles after yielding to cyclists. Advisory bike lanes are normally installed on low volume streets. Advisory bike lanes have a number of names. The U.S. Federal Highway Administration calls them "Advisory Shoulders". In New Zealand, they are called 2-minus-1 roads. They are called Schutzstreifen (Germany), Suggestiestrook (Netherlands), and Suggestion Lanes (a literal English translation of Suggestiestrook).

=== Bicycle highways ===
Denmark and the Netherlands have pioneered the concept of "bicycle superhighways". The first Dutch route opened in 2004 between Breda and Etten-Leur; many others have been added since then. In 2017 several bicycle superhighways were opened in the Arnhem-Nijmegen region, with the RijnWaalpad as the best example of this new type of cycling infrastructure.

The first Danish route, C99, opened in 2012 between the Vesterbro rail station in Copenhagen and Albertslund, a western suburb. The route cost 13.4 million Danish kroner and is 17.5 km long, built with few stops and new paths away from traffic. "Service stations" with air pumps are located at regular intervals, and where the route must cross streets, handholds and running boards are provided so cyclists can wait without having to put their feet on the ground. Similar projects have since been built in Germany among other countries.

The cost of building a bicycle super highway depends on many things, but is usually between €300,000/km (for a wide dedicated cycle track) and €800,000/km (when complex civil engineering structures are needed).

== Cycling-friendly streetscape modifications ==
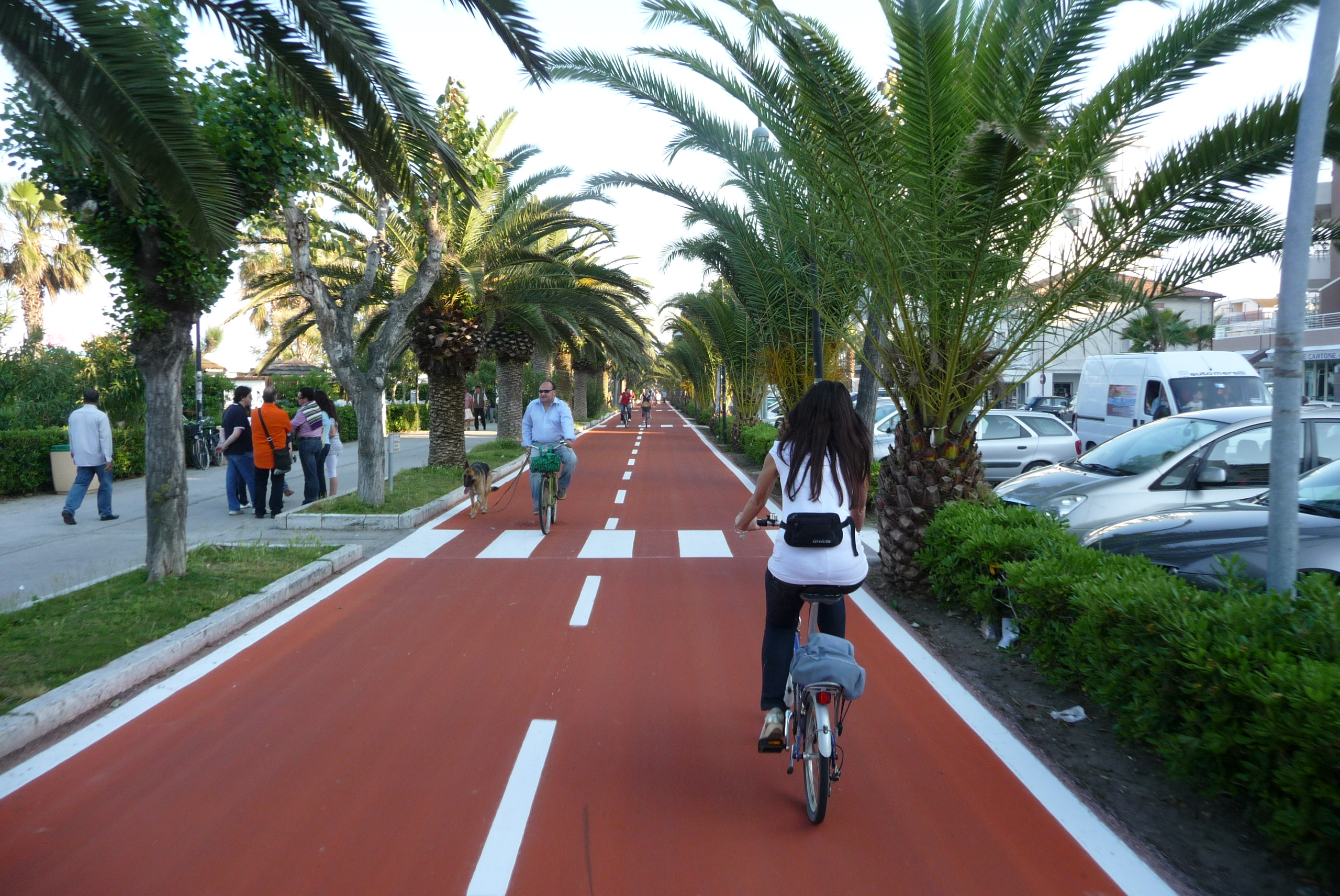
Ciclovia Adriatica, in Italy

There are various measures cities and regions often take on the roadway to make it more cycling friendly and safer. Aspects of infrastructure may be viewed as either cyclist-hostile or as cyclist-friendly. However, scientific research indicates that different groups of cyclists show varying preferences of which aspects of cycling infrastructure are most relevant when choosing a specific cycling route over another. Measures to encourage cycling include traffic calming; traffic reduction; junction treatment; traffic control systems to recognize cyclists and give them priority; exempt cyclists from banned turns and access restrictions; implement contra-flow cycle lanes on one-way streets; implement on-street parking restrictions; provide advanced stop lines/bypasses for cyclists at traffic signals; marking wide curb/kerb lanes; and marking shared bus/cycle lanes.

Colombian city, Bogota converted some car lanes into bidirectional bike lanes during coronavirus pandemic, adding 84 km of new bike lanes; the government is intending to make these new bike lanes permanent. In the US, slow-street movements have been introduced by erecting makeshift barriers to slow traffic and allow bikers and walkers to safely share the road with motorists.

=== Traffic reduction ===
Removing traffic can be achieved by straightforward diversion or alternatively reduction. Diversion involves routing through-traffic away from roads used by high numbers of cyclists and pedestrians. Examples of diversion include the construction of arterial bypasses and ring roads around urban centers.

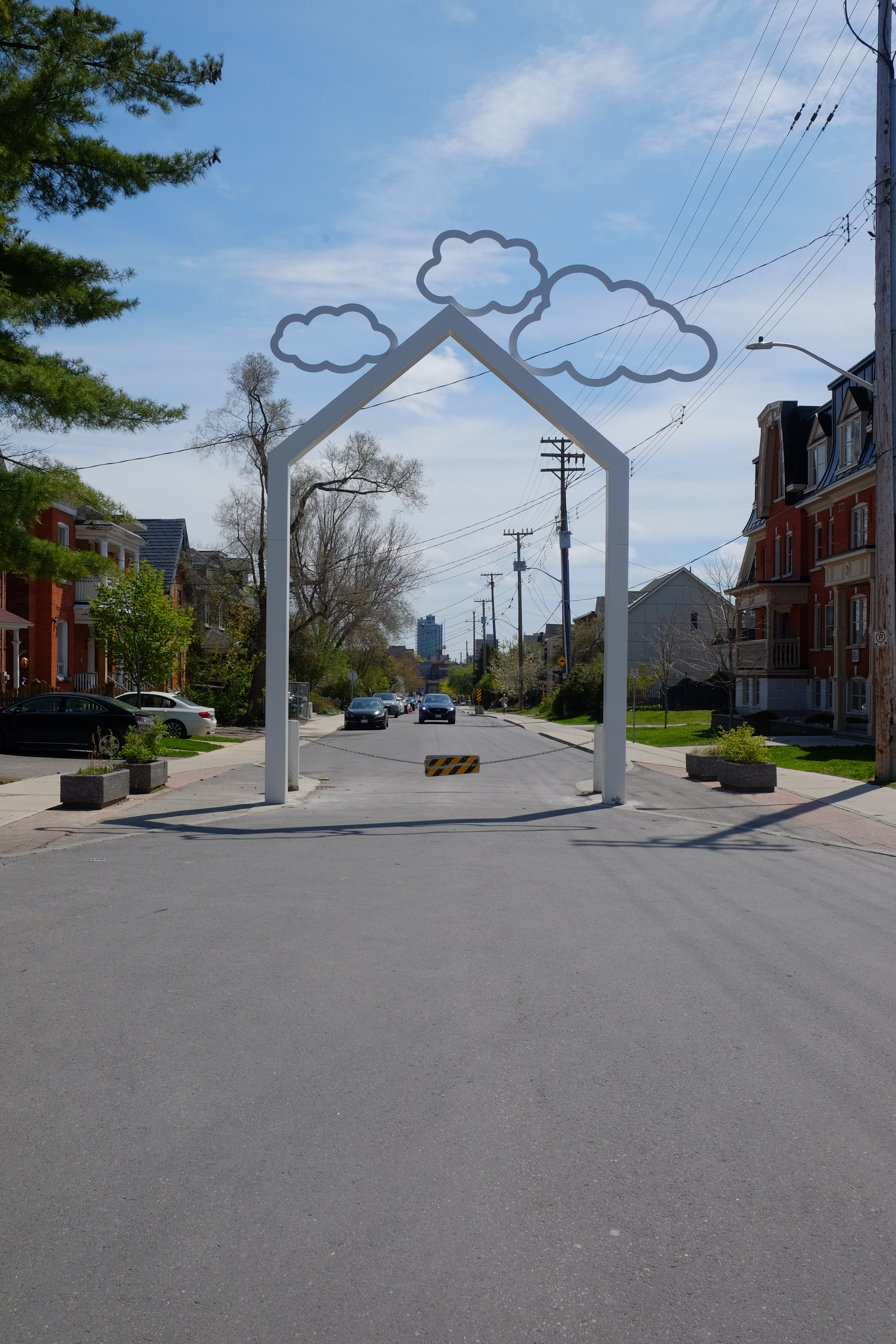
A filtered permeability "street cut" in Chinatown, Ottawa, allows bicycle and pedestrian through-traffic while preventing motorized vehicles from using the residential street as a shortcut.

Indirect methods involve reducing the infrastructural capacity dedicated to moving motorized vehicles. This can involve reducing the number of road lanes, closing bridges to certain vehicle types and creating vehicle restricted zones or environmental traffic cells. In the 1970s the Dutch city of Delft began restricting private car traffic from crossing the city center. Similarly, Groningen is divided into four zones that cannot be crossed by private motor-traffic, (private cars must use the ring road instead). Cyclists and other traffic can pass between the zones and cycling accounts for 50%+ of trips in Groningen (which reputedly has the third-highest proportion of cycle traffic of any city). The Swedish city of Gothenburg uses a similar system of traffic cells.

Another approach is to reduce the capacity to park cars. Starting in the 1970s, the city of Copenhagen, where now 36% of the trips are done by bicycle, adopted a policy of reducing available car parking capacity by several per cents per year. The city of Amsterdam, where around 40% of all trips are by bicycle, adopted similar parking reduction policies in the 80s and 90s.

Direct traffic reduction methods can involve straightforward bans or more subtle methods like road pricing schemes or road diets. The London congestion charge reportedly resulted in a significant increase in cycle use within the affected area.

=== Traffic calming ===
Speed reduction has traditionally been attempted by statutory speed limits and enforcing the assured clear distance ahead rule.

Recent implementations of shared space schemes have delivered significant traffic speed reductions. The reductions are sustainable, without the need for speed limits or speed limit enforcement. In Norrköping, Sweden, mean traffic speeds in 2006 dropped from 21 to 16 km/h (13 to 10 mph) since the implementation of such a scheme.

Even without shared street implementation, creating 30 km/h zones (or 20 mph zone) has been shown to reduce crash rates and increase numbers of cyclists and pedestrians. Other studies have revealed that lower speeds reduce community severance caused by high speed roads. Research has shown that there is more neighborhood interaction and community cohesion when speeds are reduced to 20 mph.

=== One-way streets ===
German research indicates that making one-way streets two-way for cyclists results in a reduction in the total number of collisions. In Belgium, all one-way streets in 50 km/h zones are by default two-way for cyclists. A Danish road directorate states that in town centers it is important to be able to cycle in both directions in all streets, and that in certain circumstances, two-way cycle traffic can be accommodated in an otherwise one-way street.

=== Two-way cycling on one-way streets ===
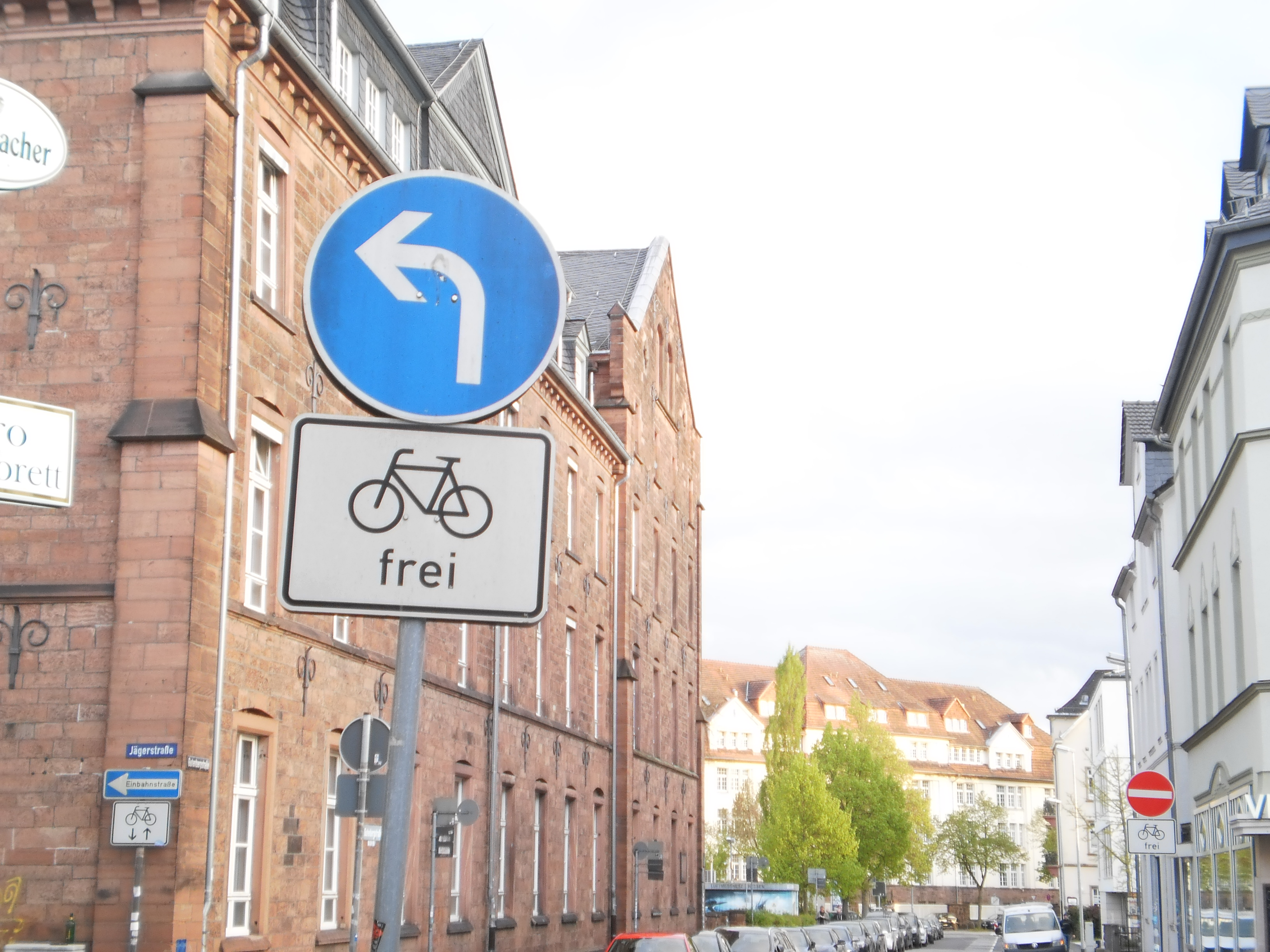
Two opened one-way streets for cyclists with additional signs (Germany)

One-way street systems can be viewed as either a product of traffic management that focuses on trying to keep motorized vehicles moving regardless of the social and other impacts, such as by some cycling campaigners, or seen as a useful tool for traffic calming, and for eliminating rat runs, in the view of UK traffic planners.

One-way streets can disadvantage cyclists by increasing trip-length, delays and hazards associated with weaving maneuvers at junctions. In northern European countries such as the Netherlands, however, cyclists are frequently granted exemptions from one-way street restrictions, which improves cycling traffic flow while restricting motorized vehicles.

German research indicates that making one-way streets two-way for cyclists results in a reduction in the total number of collisions.

There are often restrictions to what one-way streets are good candidates for allowing two-way cycling traffic. In Belgium road authorities in principle allow any one-way street in 50 kilometres per hour (31 mph) zones to be two-way for cyclists if the available lane is at least 3 metres (9.8 ft) wide (area free from parking) and no specific local circumstances prevent it. Denmark, a country with high cycling levels, does not use one-way systems to improve traffic flow. Some commentators argue that the initial goal should be to dismantle large one-way street systems as a traffic calming/traffic reduction measure, followed by the provision of two-way cyclist access on any one-way streets that remain.

=== Intersection and junction design ===
In general, junction designs that favor higher-speed turning, weaving and merging movements by motorists tend to be hostile for cyclists. Free-flowing arrangements can be hazardous for cyclists and should be avoided. Features such as large entry curvature, slip-roads and high flow roundabouts are associated with increased risk of car–cyclist collisions. Cycling advocates argue for modifications and alternative junction types that resolve these issues such as reducing kerb radii on street corners, eliminating slip roads and replacing large roundabouts with signalized intersections.

=== Protected intersection ===
Another approach which the Netherlands innovated is called in North America a protected intersection that reconfigures intersections to reduce risk to cyclists as they cross or turn. Some American cities are starting to pilot protected intersections.

==== Bike box ====
A bike box or an advanced stop line is a designated area at the head of a traffic lane at a signalized intersection that provides bicyclists with a safer and more visible way to get ahead of queuing traffic during the red signal phase.

==== Roundabouts ====
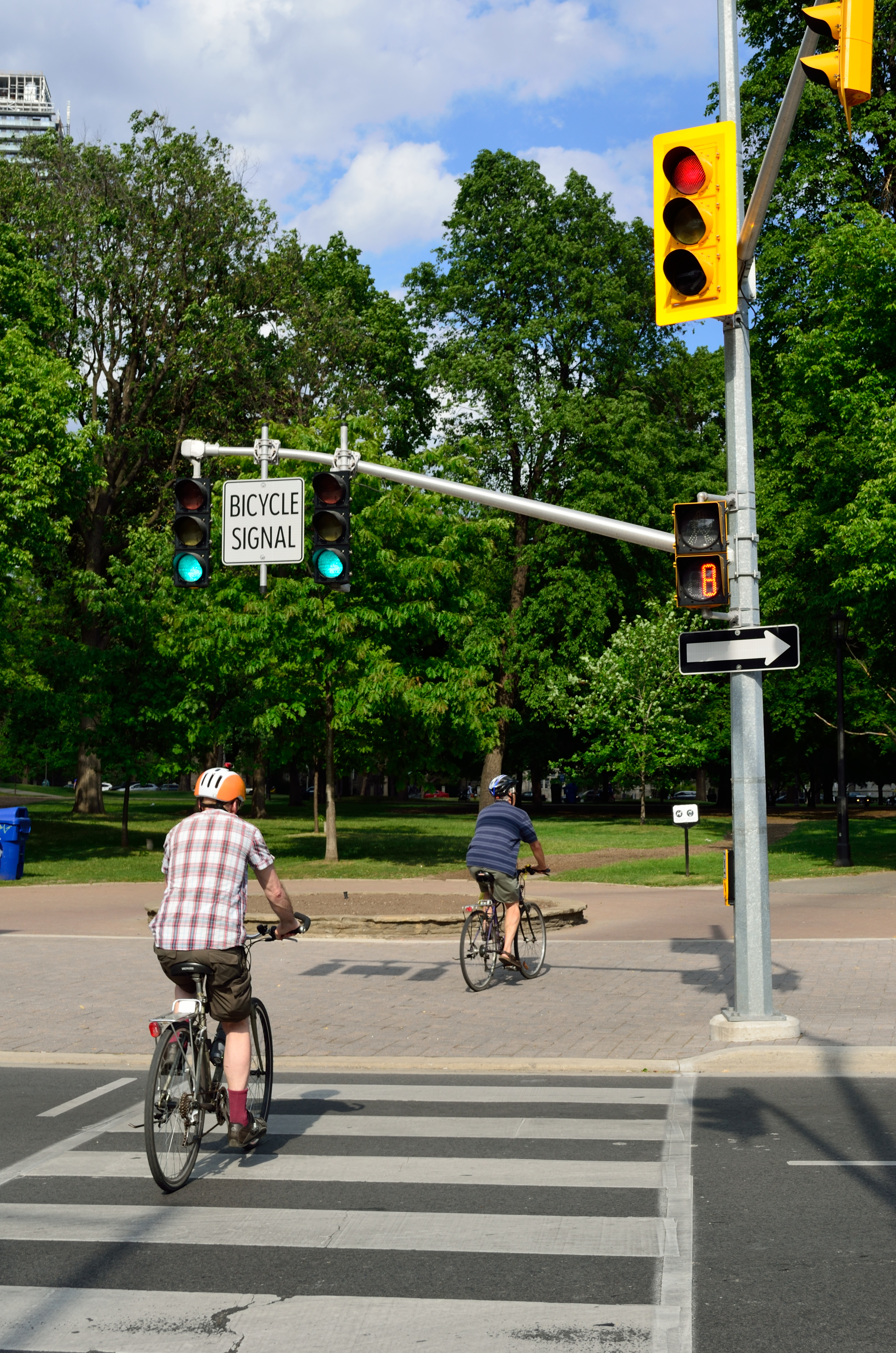
A bicycle signal light in Toronto

On large roundabouts of the design typically used in the UK and Ireland, cyclists have an injury accident rate that is 14–16 times that of motorists. Research indicates that excessive sightlines at uncontrolled intersections compound these effects. In the UK, a survey of over 8,000 highly experienced and mainly adult male Cyclists Touring Club members found that 28% avoided roundabouts on their regular journey if at all possible. The Dutch CROW guidelines recommend roundabouts only for intersections with motorized traffic up to 1500 per hour. To accommodate greater volumes of traffic, they recommend traffic light intersections or grade separation for cyclists. Examples of grade separation for cyclists include tunnels, or more spectacularly, raised "floating" roundabouts for cyclists.

==== Traffic signals/Traffic control systems ====
How traffic signals are designed and implemented directly impacts cyclists. For instance, poorly adjusted vehicle detector systems, used to trigger signal changes, may not correctly detect cyclists. This can leave cyclists in the position of having to "run" red lights if no motorized vehicle arrives to trigger a signal change. Some cities use urban adaptive traffic control systems (UTCs), which use linked traffic signals to manage traffic in response to changes in demand. There is an argument that using a UTC system merely to provide for increased capacity for motor traffic will simply drive growth in such traffic. However, there are more direct negative impacts. For instance, where signals are arranged to provide motor traffic with so-called green waves, this can create "red waves" for other road users such as cyclists and public transport services. Traffic managers in Copenhagen have now turned this approach on its head and are linking cyclist-specific traffic signals on a major arterial bike lane to provide green waves for rush hour cycle-traffic. However, this would still not resolve the problem of red-waves for slow (old and young) and fast (above average fitness) cyclists. Cycling-specific measures that can be applied at traffic signals include the use of advanced stop lines and/or bypasses. In some cases cyclists might be given a free-turn or a signal bypass if turning into a road on the nearside.

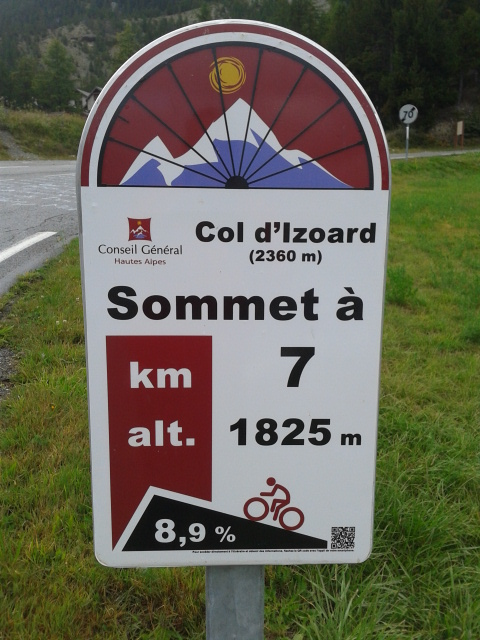
One of the mountain pass cycling milestones placed along the climb to the Col d'Izoard in the French Alps

=== Signposting ===
In many places worldwide special signposts for bicycles are used to indicate directions and distances to destinations for cyclists. Apart from signposting in and between urban areas, mountain pass cycling milestones have become an important service for bicycle tourists. They provide cyclists with information about their current position with regard to the summit of the mountain pass.

Numbered-node cycle networks are increasingly used in Europe to give flexible, low-cost signage.

=== Widening outside lanes ===
One method for reducing potential friction between cyclists and motorized vehicles is to provide "wide kerb", or "nearside", lanes (UK terminology) or "wide outside through lane" (U.S. terminology). These extra-wide lanes increase the probability that motorists pass cyclists at a safe distance without having to change lanes. This is held to be particularly important on routes with a high proportion of wide vehicles such as buses or heavy goods vehicles (HGVs). They also provide more room for cyclists to filter past queues of cars in congested conditions and to safely overtake each other. Due to the tendency of all vehicle users to stay in the center of their lane, it would be necessary to sub-divide the cycle lane with a broken white line to facilitate safe overtaking. Overtaking is indispensable for cyclists, as speeds are not dependent on the legal speed limit, but on the rider's capability.

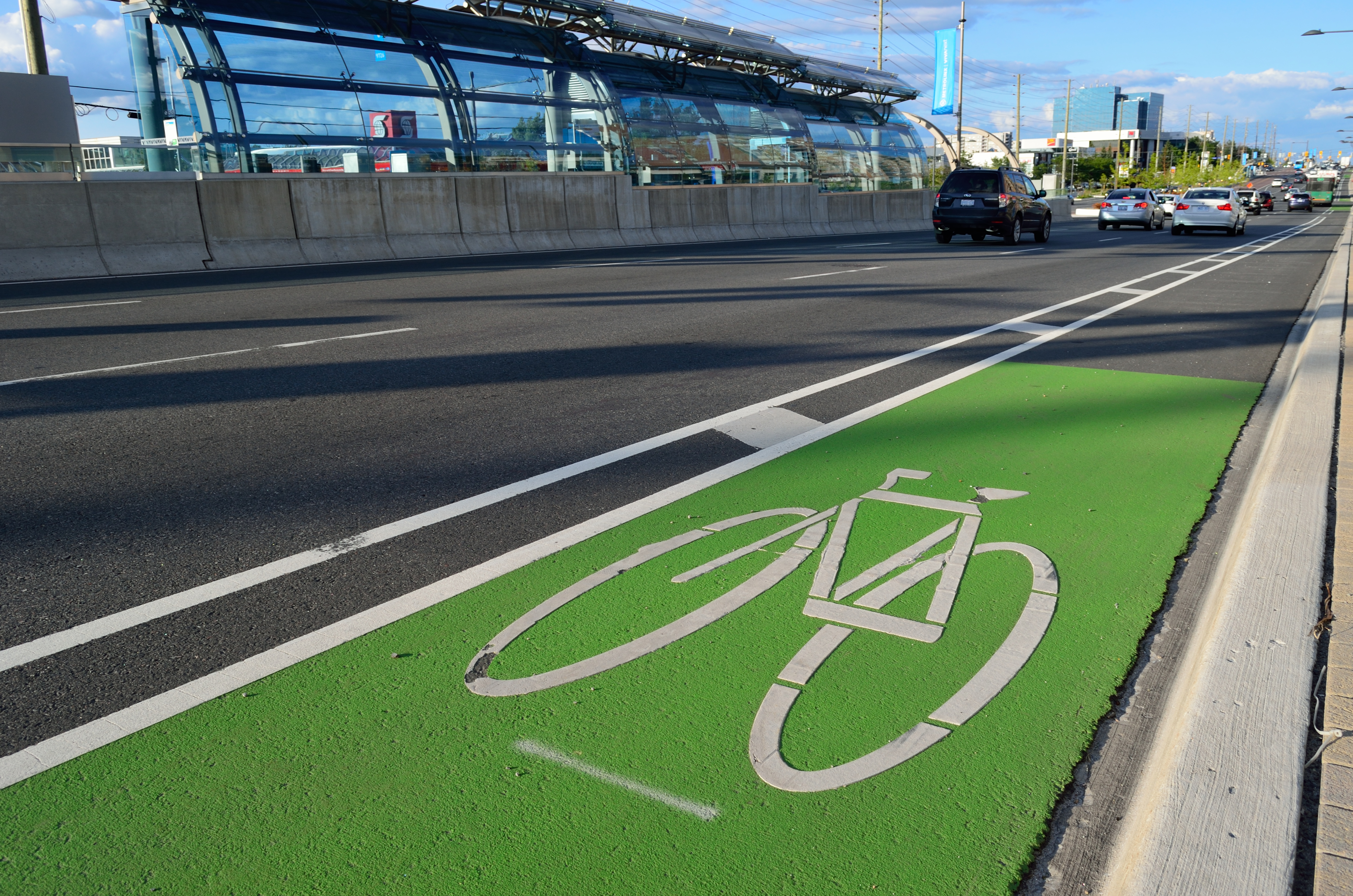
A buffered bike lane in Vaughan, Ontario, Canada

The use of such lanes is specifically endorsed by Cycling: the way ahead for towns and cities, the European Commission policy document on cycle promotion.

=== Shared space ===
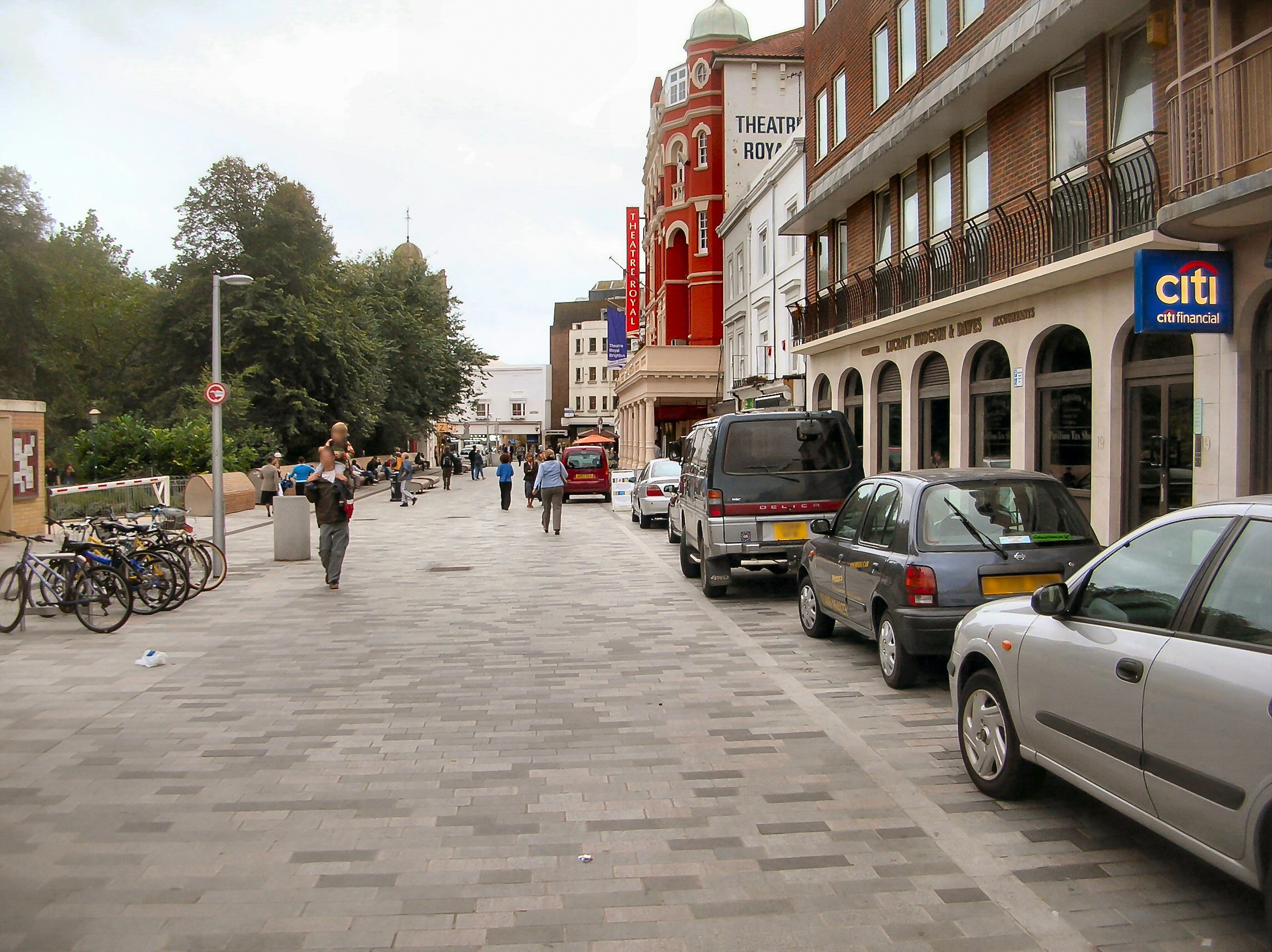
New Road, Brighton – shared space scheme reduced motor traffic by 93%.

Shared space schemes extend this principle further by removing the reliance on lane markings altogether, and also removing road signs and signals, allowing all road users to use any part of the road, and giving all road users equal priority and equal responsibility for each other's safety. Experiences where these schemes are in use show that road users, particularly motorists, undirected by signs, kerbs, or road markings, reduce their speed and establish eye contact with other users. Results from the thousands of such implementations worldwide all show casualty reductions and most also show reduced journey times. After the partial conversion of London's Kensington High Street to shared space, accidents decreased by 44% (the London average was 17%). However, in July 2018, the UK 'paused' all further shared space schemes over fears that a scheme dependent on eye-contact between drivers and pedestrians was unavoidably dangerous to pedestrians with visual impairments.

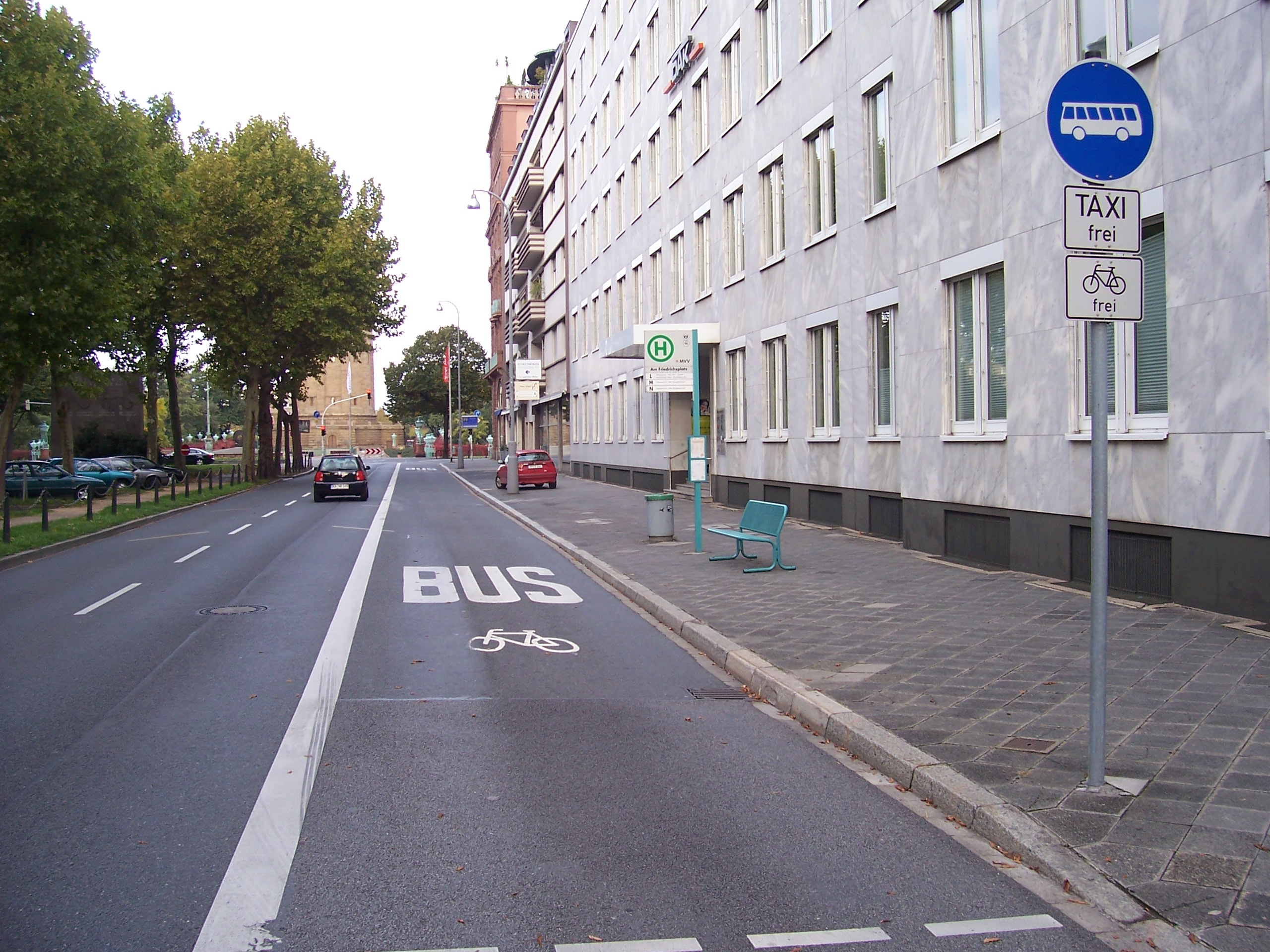
A shared bus and cycle lane in Mannheim, Germany

Cycle-Friendly Infrastructure (CFI) argues for a marked lane width of 4.25 metres (13.9 ft). On undivided roads, width provides cyclists with adequate clearance from passing HGVs while being narrow enough to deter drivers from "doubling up" to form two lanes. This "doubling up" effect may be related to junctions. At non-junction locations, greater width might be preferable if this effect can be avoided. The European Commission specifically endorses wide lanes in its policy document on cycling promotion, Cycling: the way ahead for towns and cities.

=== Shared bus and cycle lanes ===
Shared bus and cycle lanes are also a method for providing a more comfortable and safer space for cyclists. Depending on the width of the lane, the speeds and number of buses, and other local factors, the safety and popularity of this arrangement vary.

In the Netherlands mixed bus/cycle lanes are uncommon. According to the Sustainable Safety guidelines they would violate the principle of homogeneity and put road users of very different masses and speed behavior into the same lane, which is generally discouraged.

=== Road surface ===
Bicycle tires being narrow, road surface is more important than for other transport, for both comfort and safety. The type and placement of storm drains, manholes, surface markings, and the general road surface quality should all be taken into account by a bicycle transportation engineer. Drain grates, for example, must not catch wheels.

== Trip-end facilities ==
=== Bicycle parking/storage arrangements ===
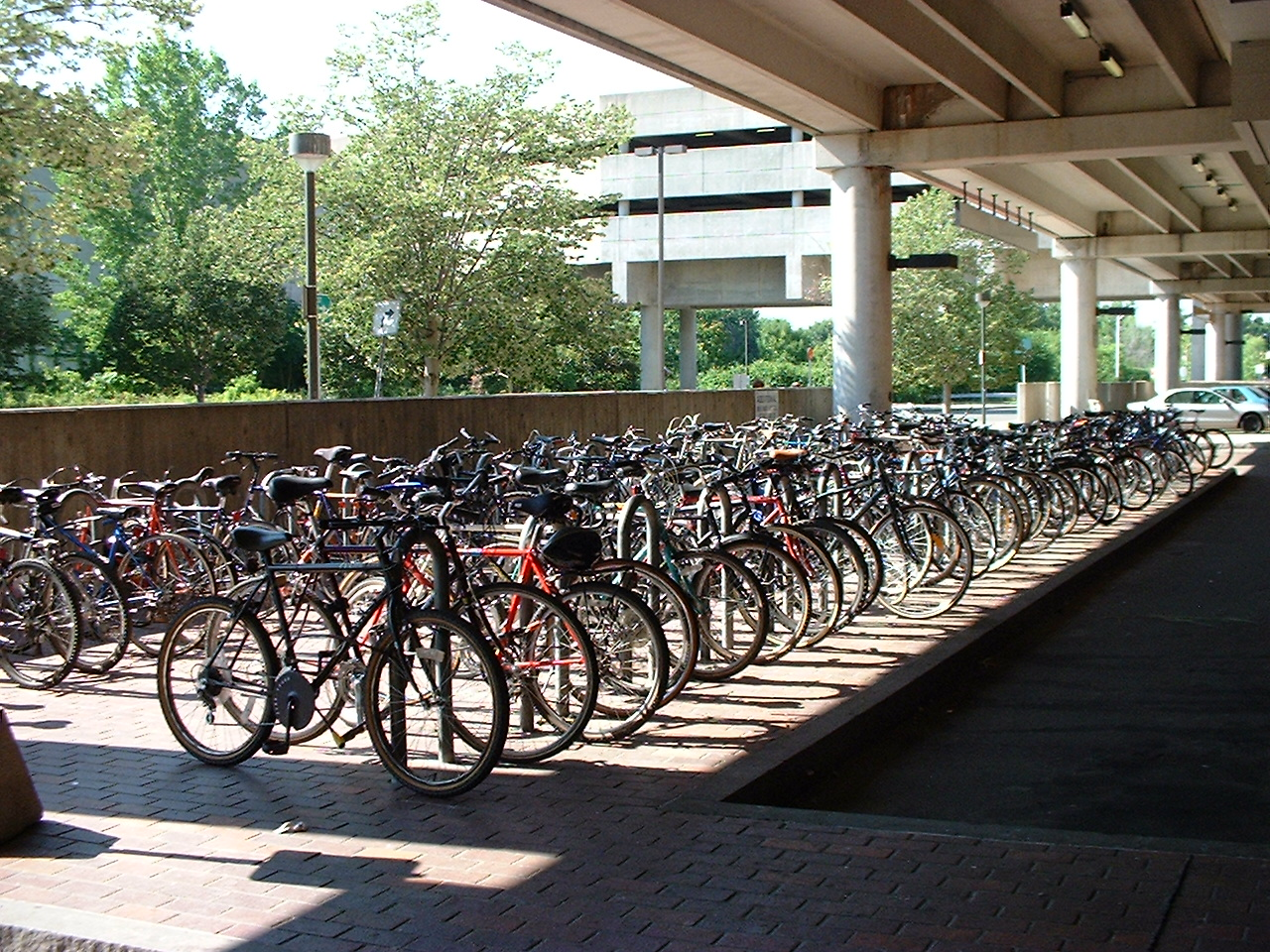
Bicycle parking at the Alewife subway station in Cambridge, Massachusetts, located at the intersection of three cycle paths

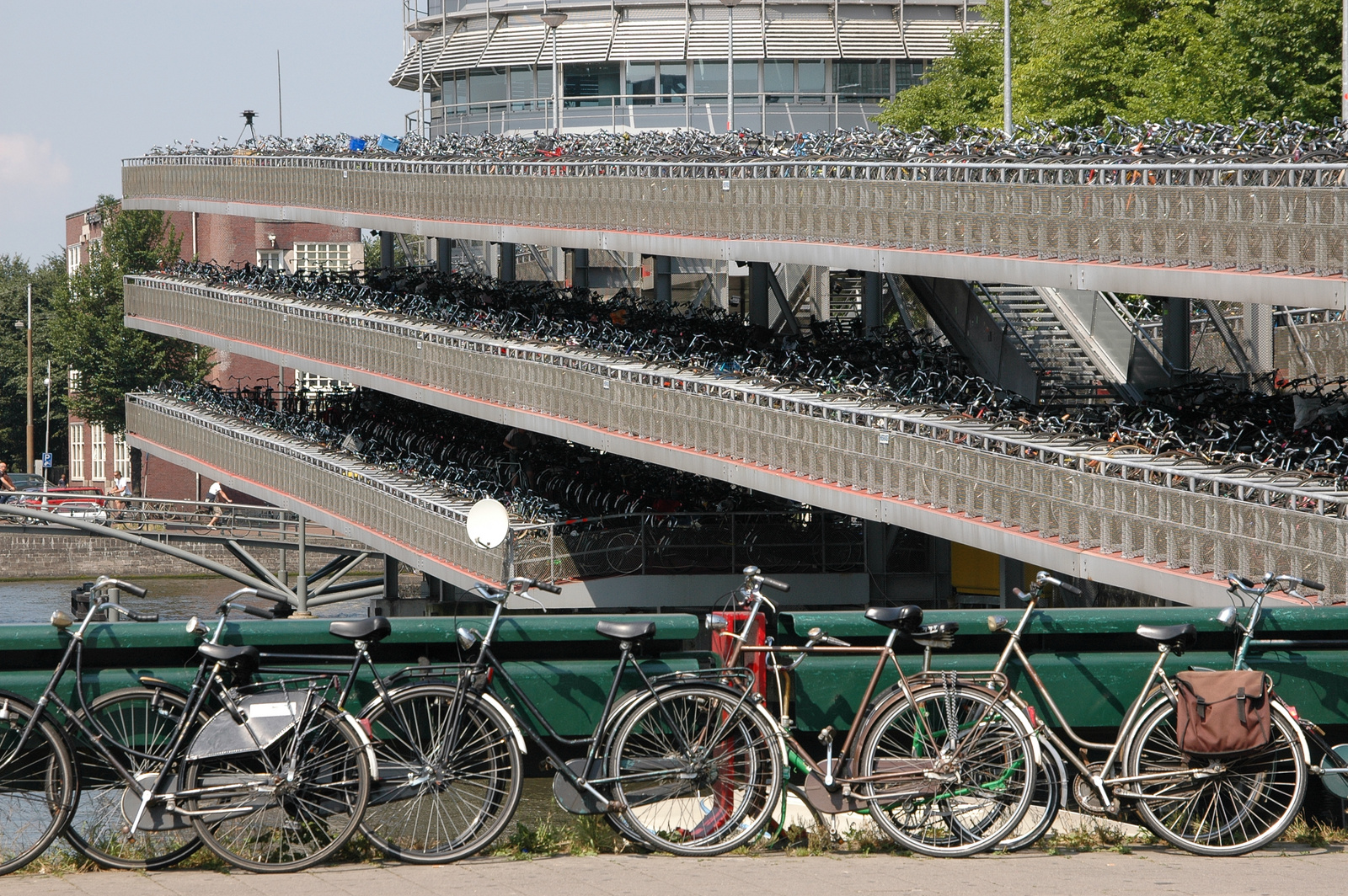
Multi-storey bicycle parking in Amsterdam

According to a 2004 study by Dutch transport planner, Karel Martens, the placement of bicycle parking infrastructure around public transport stations, from bus stops to train stations increases the accessibility of such locations to people and increases the amount of passengers who use those forms of transportation. As secure and convenient bicycle parking is a key factor in influencing a person's decision to cycle, decent parking infrastructure must be provided to encourage the uptake of cycling. Decent bicycle parking involves weather-proof infrastructure such as lockers, stands, staffed or unstaffed bicycle parks, as well as bike parking facilities within workplaces to facilitate bicycle commuting. It also will help if certain legal arrangements are put into place to enable legitimate ad hoc parking, for example to allow people to lock their bicycles to railings, signs and other street furniture when individual proper bike stands are unavailable.

=== Other trip end facilities ===
Some people need to wear special clothes such as business suits or uniforms in their daily work. In some cases the nature of the cycling infrastructure and the prevailing weather conditions may make it very hard to both cycle and maintain the work clothes in a presentable condition. It is argued that such workers can be encouraged to cycle by providing lockers, changing rooms and shower facilities where they can change before starting work.

== Theft reduction measures ==
The theft of bicycles is one of the major problems that slow the development of urban cycling. Bicycle theft discourages regular cyclists from buying new bicycles, as well as putting off people who might want to invest in a bicycle.

Several measures can help reduce bicycle theft:

- Bicycle parking stations - buildings or structures designed for use as bicycle parking facilities, primarily for bicycle security
- Bicycle registration to enable recovery if stolen
- Danish bicycle VIN-system, a law requiring all bicycles in Denmark to have a vehicle identification number (VIN) with the bike's manufacturer code, a serial number, and a construction year code
- Making cyclists aware of antitheft devices and their effective use
- Mounting sting operations to catch thieves
- Secure bicycle parking: offering safe bicycle parking facilities such as guarded bicycle parking (staffed or with camera surveillance) or bicycle lockers
- Promoting devices to enable remote tracking of a bicycle's location
- Targeting cycle thieves
- Using folding bicycles which can be safely stored (for example) in cloakrooms or under desks.

Certain European countries apply such measures with success, such as the Netherlands or certain German cities using registration and recovery. Since mid-2004, France has instituted a system of registration, in some places allowing stolen bicycles to be put on file in partnership with the urban cyclists' associations. This approach has reputedly increased the stolen bicycle recovery rate to more than 40%. By comparison, before the commencement of registration, the recovery rate in France was about 2%.

In some areas of the United Kingdom, bicycles fitted with location tracking devices are left poorly secured in theft hot-spots. When the bike is stolen, the police can locate it and arrest the thieves. This sometimes leads to the dismantling of organized bicycle theft rings, as bike theft generally enjoys a very low priority with the police.

== Bicycle lift ==
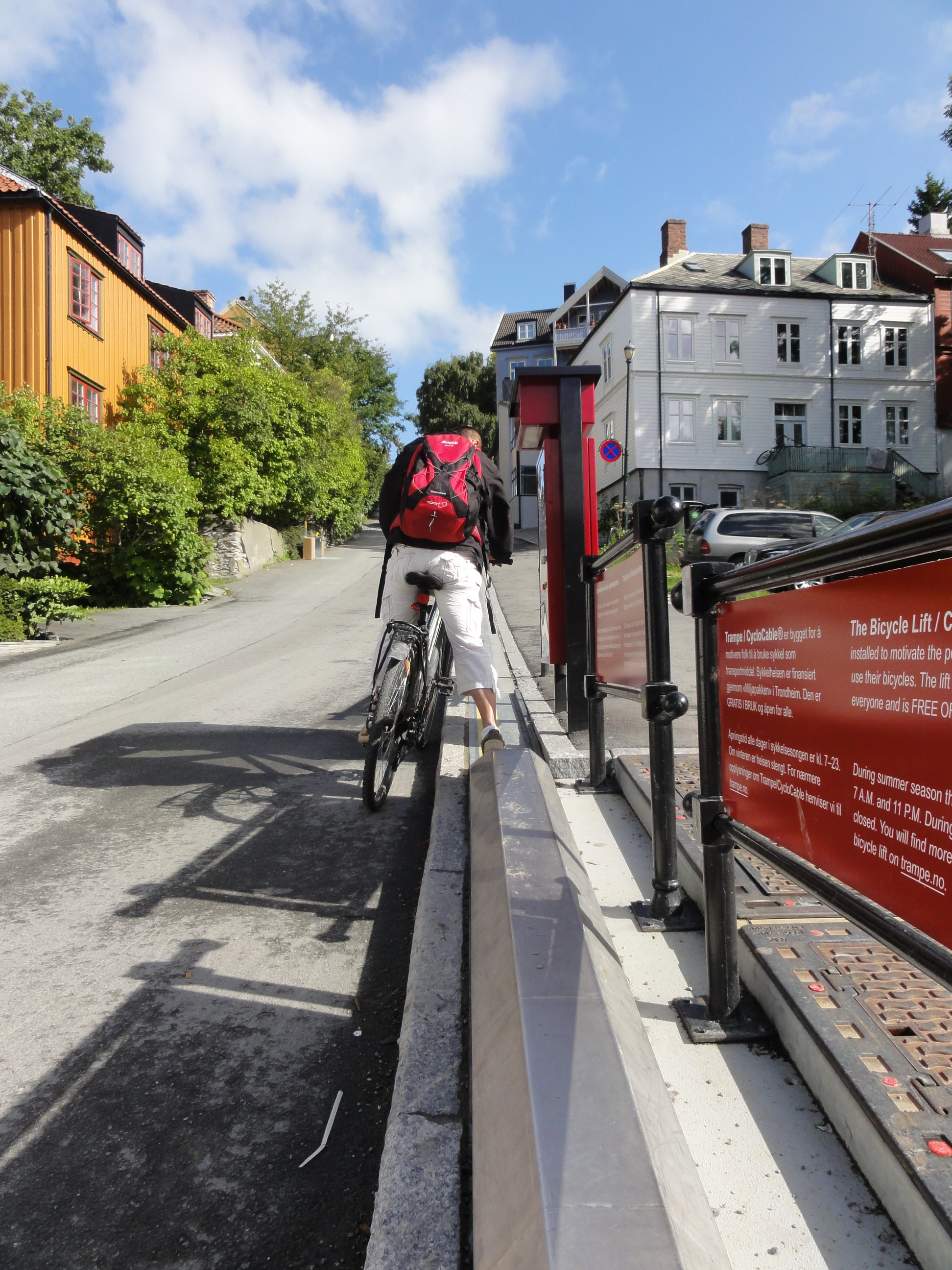
Bicycle lift in Trondheim, Norway

Bicycle lifts are used to haul bikes up stairs and steep hills. They are used to improve accessibility and encourage casual cycling.

Bike escalators are widely used in East Asia and are used in parts of Europe.

== Impact ==
According to a 2019 study, protected and separated bike infrastructure is associated with greater safety outcomes for all road users.

A 2021 review of existing research found that closing car lanes and replacing them with bike lanes or pedestrian lanes had positive or non-significant economic effects.

A 2021 case-control study of cities found that redistributing street space for cycling infrastructure—for so-called "pop-up bike lanes" during the COVID-19 pandemic—lead to large additional increases in cycling. These may have substantial environmental and health benefits which contemporary decision-makers have pledged to genuinely strive for with set goals such as CO_{2} emissions reductions of 55% by 2030 by the EU, climate change mitigation responsibilities of the Paris Agreement and EU air quality rules.

== Integration with public transit ==
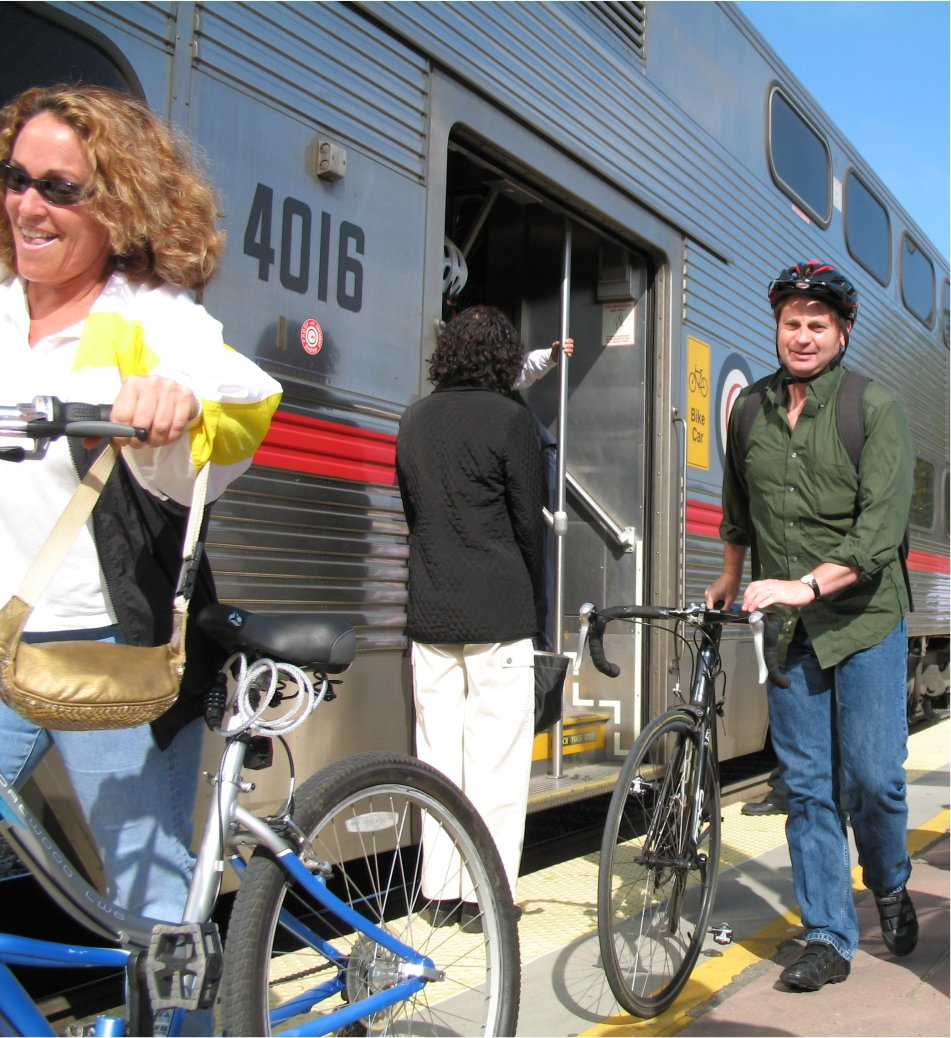
Bike commuters disembark at Palo Alto, California

Cycling is often integrated with other transport. For example, in the Netherlands and Denmark a large number of train journeys may start by bicycle. In 1991, 44% of Dutch train travelers went to their local station by bicycle and 14% used a bicycle at their destinations. The key ingredients for this are claimed to be:

- an efficient, attractive and affordable train service
- secure bike parking at train stations
- a quick and easy bicycle rental system for commuters, the OV-bicycle scheme, at train stations
- a town planning policy that results in a sufficient proportion of the potential commuter population (e.g. 44%) living/working within a reasonable cycling distance of the train stations.

It has been argued in relation to this aspect of Dutch or Danish policy that ongoing investment in rail services is vital to maintaining their levels of cycle use.

Cycling and public transport are well integrated in Japan. Starting in 1978, Japan expanded bicycle parking supply at railway stations from 598,000 spaces in 1977 to 2,382,000 spaces in 1987. As of 1987, Japanese provisions included 516 multi-story garages for bicycle parking.

In some cities, bicycles may be carried on local trains, trams and buses so that they may be used at either end of the trip. The Rheinbahn transit company in Düsseldorf permits bicycle carriage on all its bus, tram and train services at any time of the day. In Munich bicycles are allowed on the S-Bahn commuter trains outside of rush hours, and folding bikes are allowed on city busses. In Copenhagen, you can take your bicycle with you in the S-tog commuter trains, all times a day with no additional costs. In France, the prestigious TGV high-speed trains are even having some of their first class capacity converted to store bicycles. There have also been schemes, such as in Victoria, British Columbia, Acadia, and Canberra, Australia, to provide bicycle carriage on buses using externally mounted bike carriers.

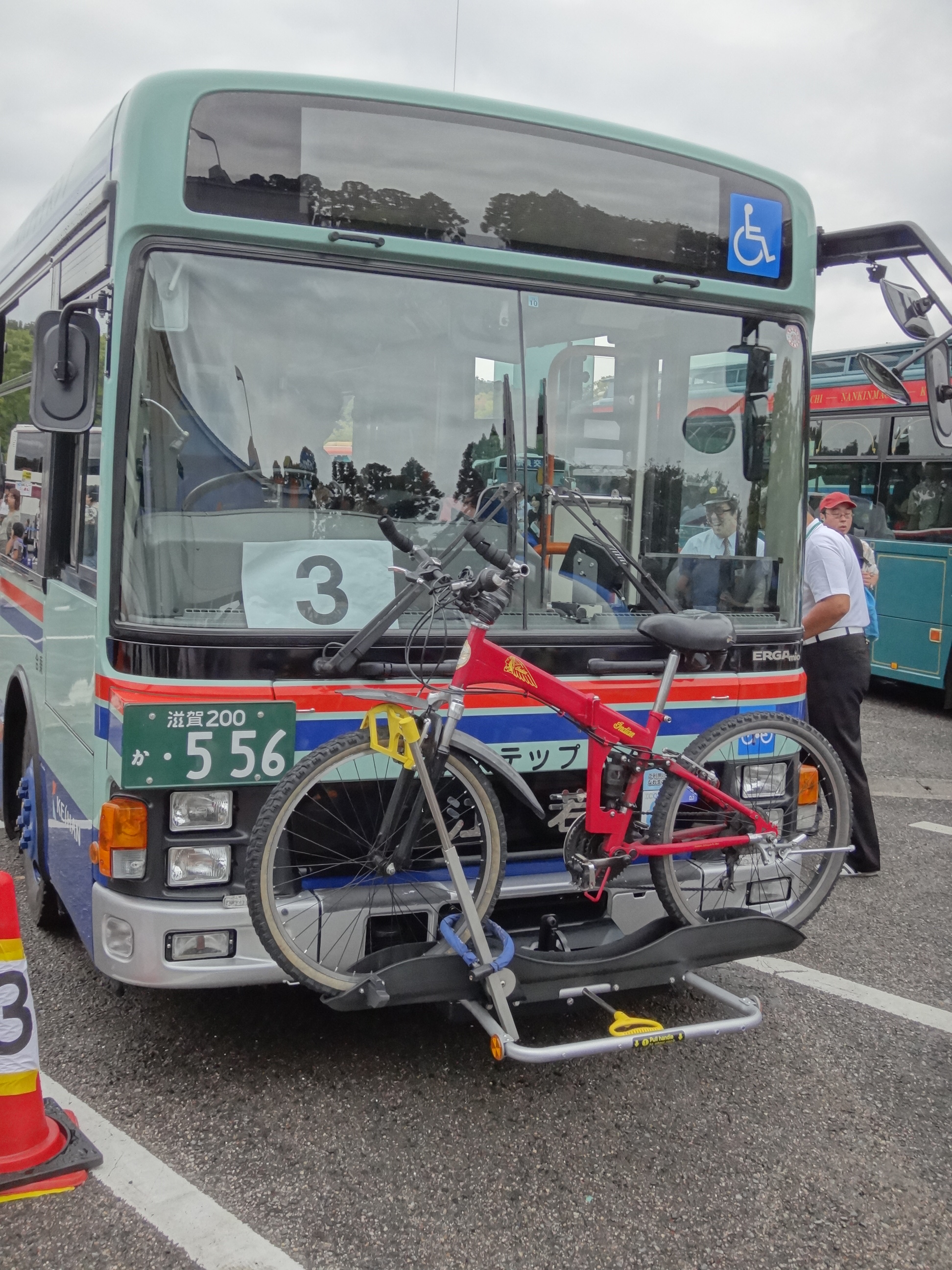
Kōjaku Kōtsū bus in Shiga Prefecture, Japan

In some Canadian cities, including Edmonton, Alberta, and Toronto, Ontario, busses on most city routes have externally mounted carriers for bicycles, and bikes are allowed on the light rail trains at no extra cost outside of rush hour. All public transit buses in Chicago and suburbs allow up to two bikes at all times. The same is true of Grand River Transit buses in the Region of Waterloo, Ontario, Canada. Trains allow bikes with some restrictions. Where such services are not available, some cyclists get around this restriction by removing their pedals and loosening their handlebars as to fit into a box or by using folding bikes that can be brought onto the train or bus like a piece of luggage. The article on buses in Christchurch, New Zealand, lists 27 routes with bike racks.

In the EU regional train services must carry bikes, and from 2025 new and major upgraded trains are generally required to have space for at least 4 non-folding bikes; however international services with countries outside the EU are exempt from these rules. In 2023 Eurostar cycle booking was described as "farcical". Nevertheless EU train operators are sometimes allowed to restrict bikes, for example on old rolling stock or during peak hours.

UK provision for bikes on trains varies considerably, with some train operating companies being criticised, for example for only providing vertical storage, which can be difficult or impossible to use. A UK Department for Transport 2021 white paper said "Bringing a bike on board makes a train journey even more convenient, yet even as cycling has grown in popularity, the railways have reduced space available for bikes on trains. Great British Railways will reverse that, increasing space on existing trains wherever practically possible, including on popular leisure routes." A DoT train specification document issued in 2012 says " Provision must be made for an excess luggage storage area which, as a minimum, is capable of accommodating two bicycles or luggage up to a minimum total volume of 2m3" with a bicycle being defined as a "Full size 'road' bicycle with 25inch frame". As of 2024 some UK train companies severely limit bikes, for example GWR does not guarantee storage for bikes which have wheels with a rim diameter more than 50cm, which most bicycles do.

== Bikesharing systems ==
A bicycle sharing system, public bicycle system, or bike share scheme, is a service in which bicycles are made available for shared use to individuals on a very short-term basis. Bike share schemes allow people to borrow a bike from point "A" and return it at point "B". Many of the bicycle sharing systems are on a subscription basis.

== Examples of cycling infrastructure ==
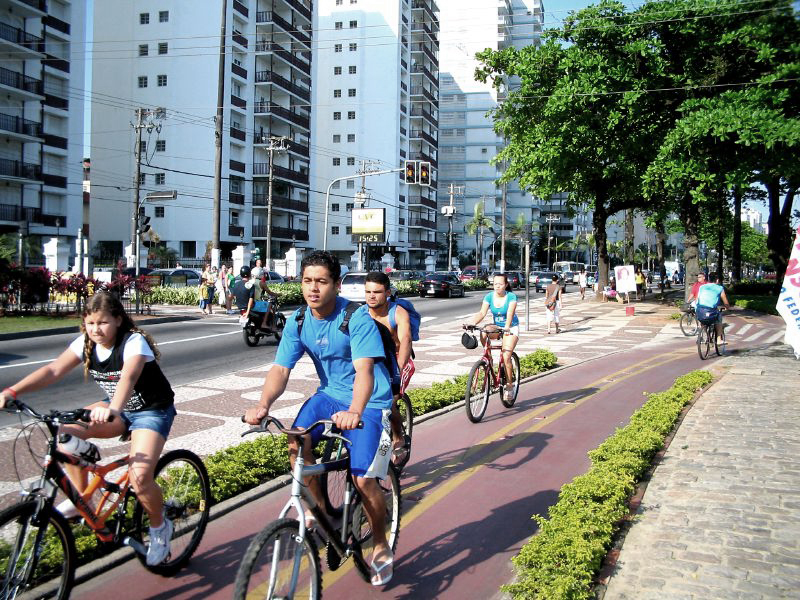
Cycling in Santos, Brazil

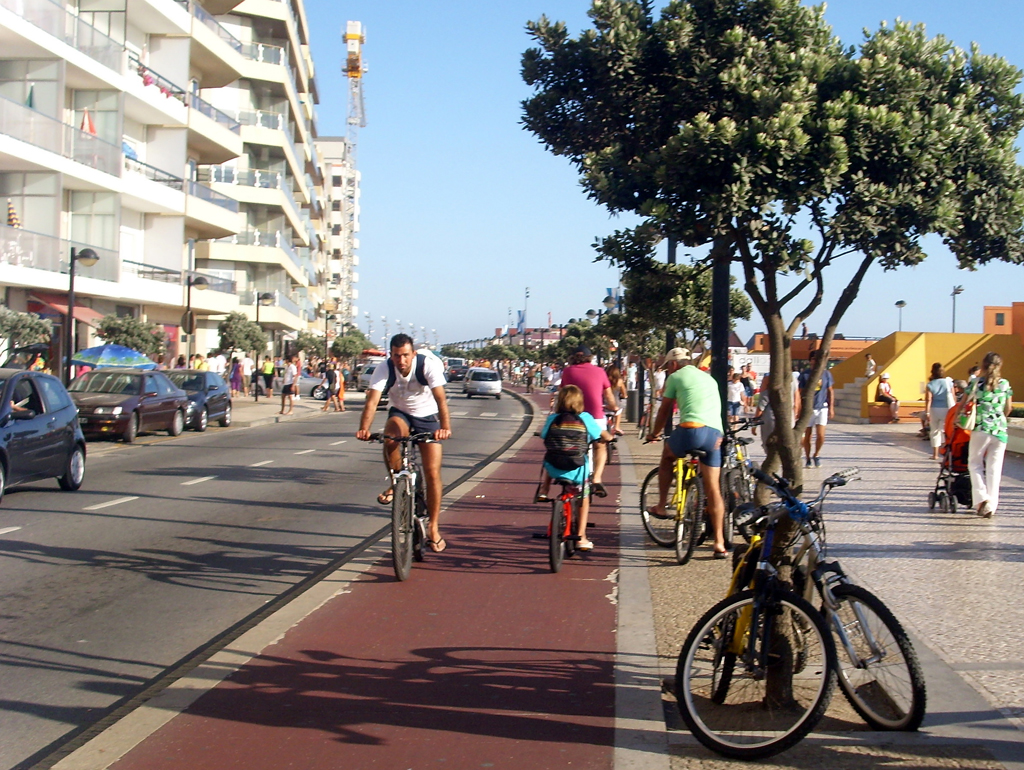
Bikeway in Portugal

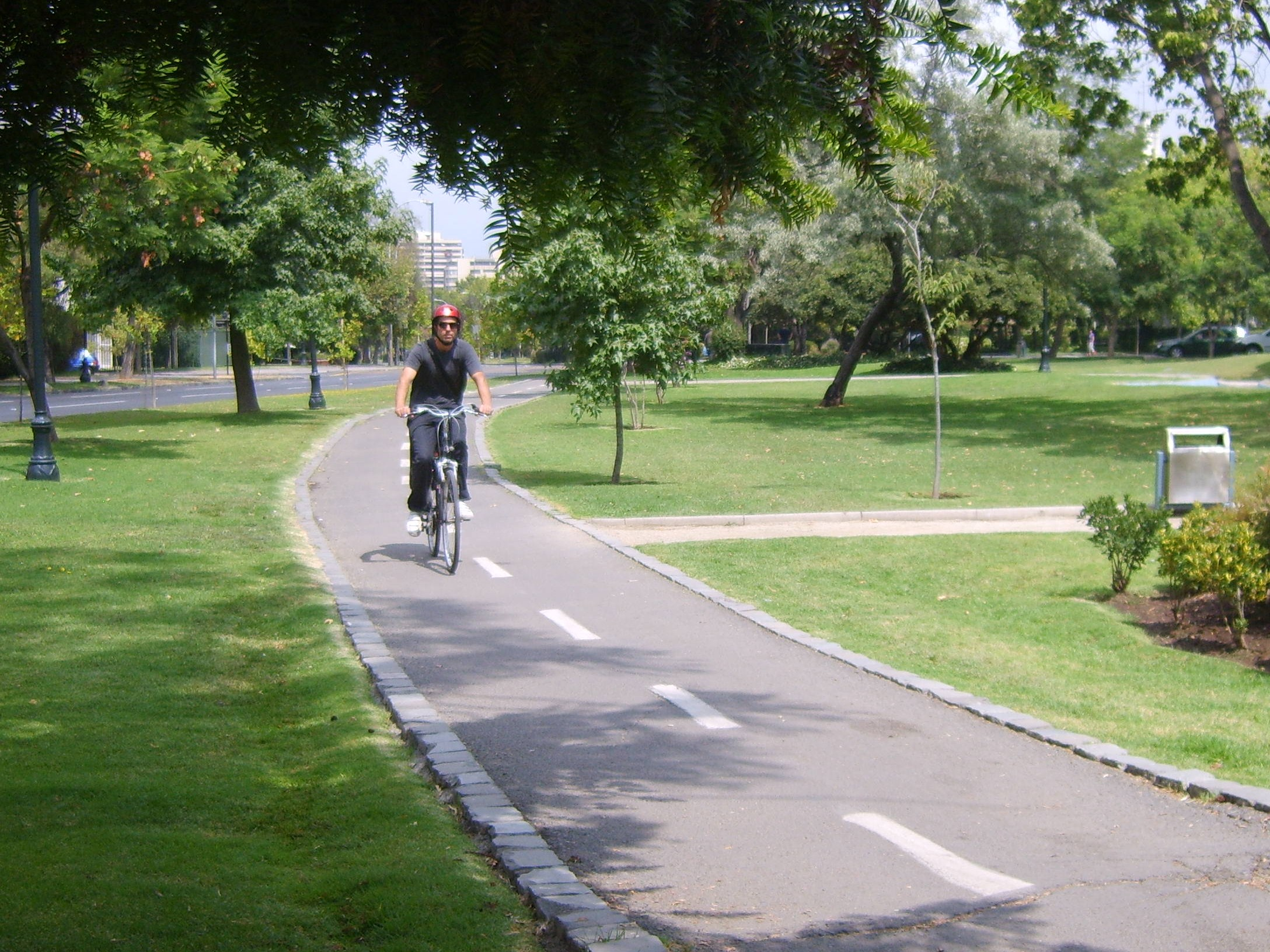
Bikeway in Pocuro, Chile

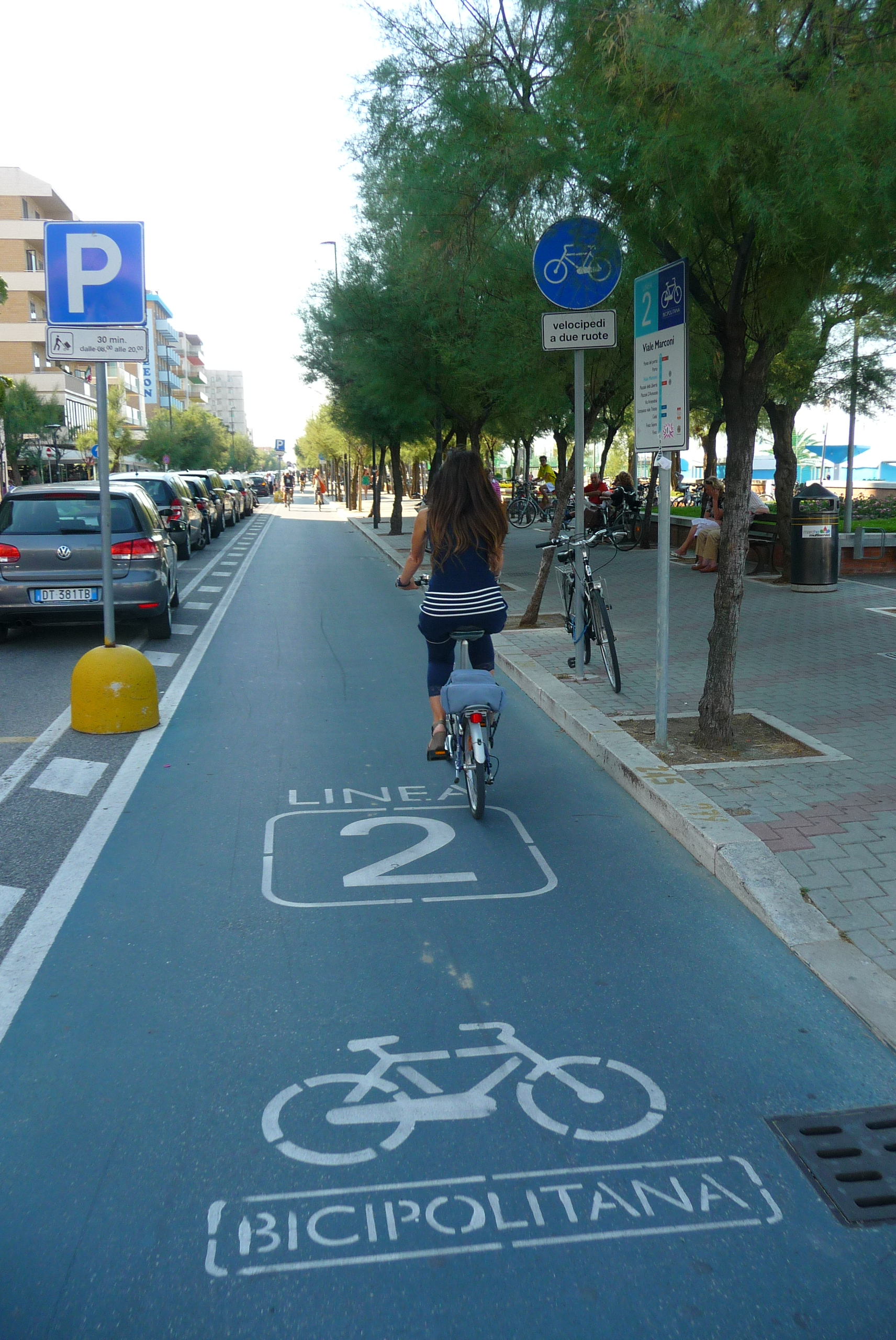
Bikeway in Pesaro, Italy

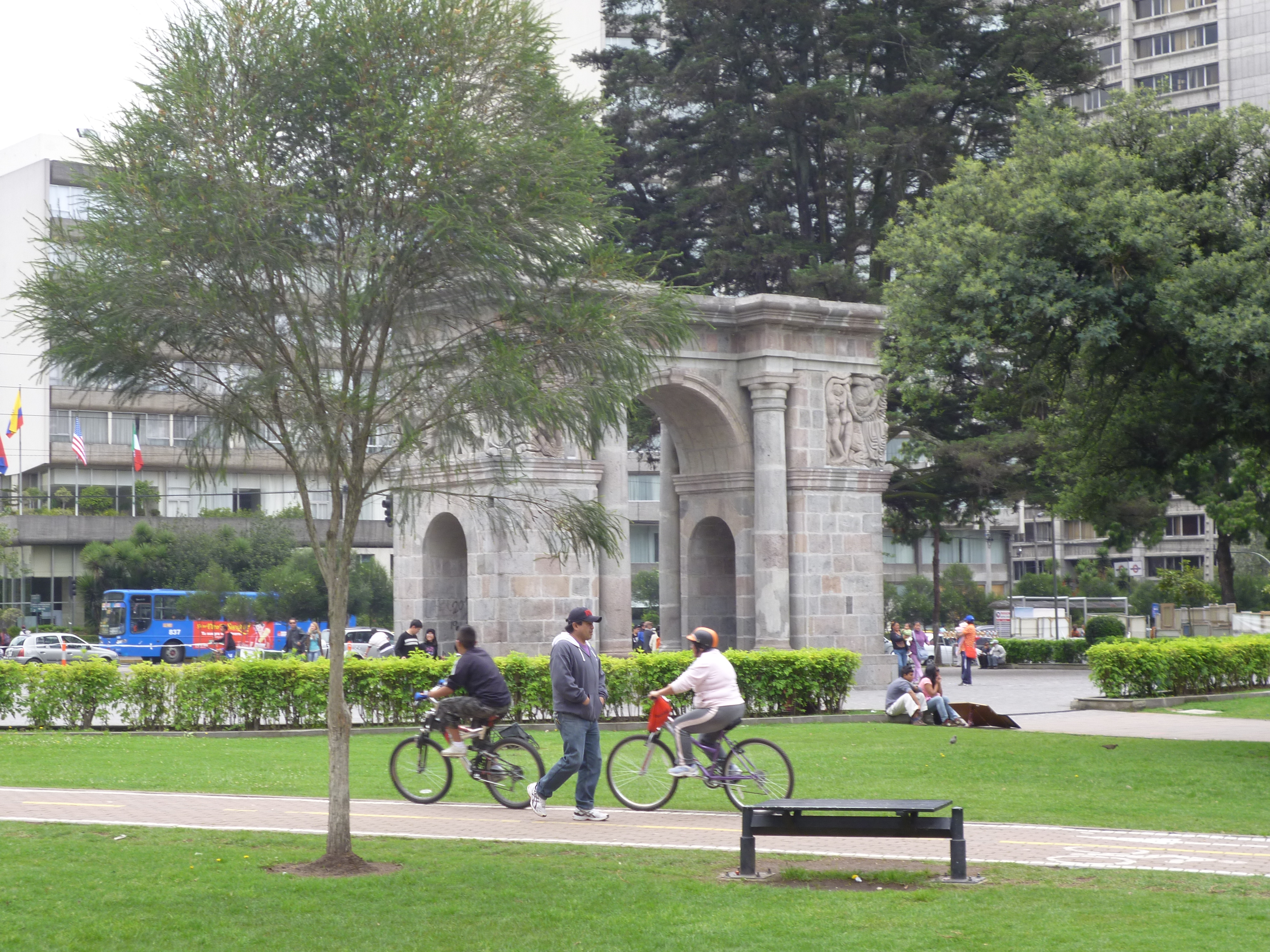
Ciclopaseo, Ciclovía Ejido Park Quito, Ecuador

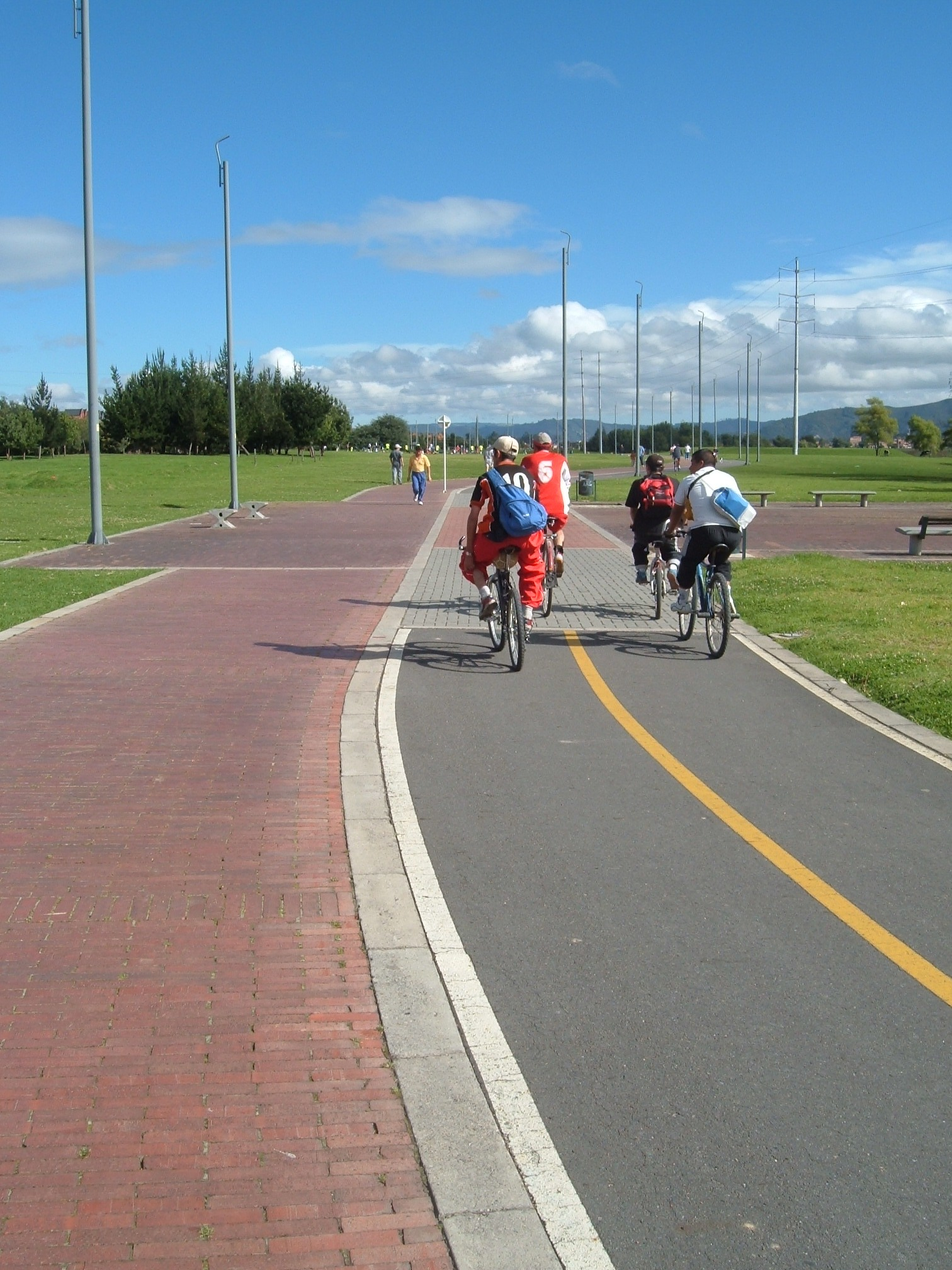
Bikeway in Bogotá, Colombia

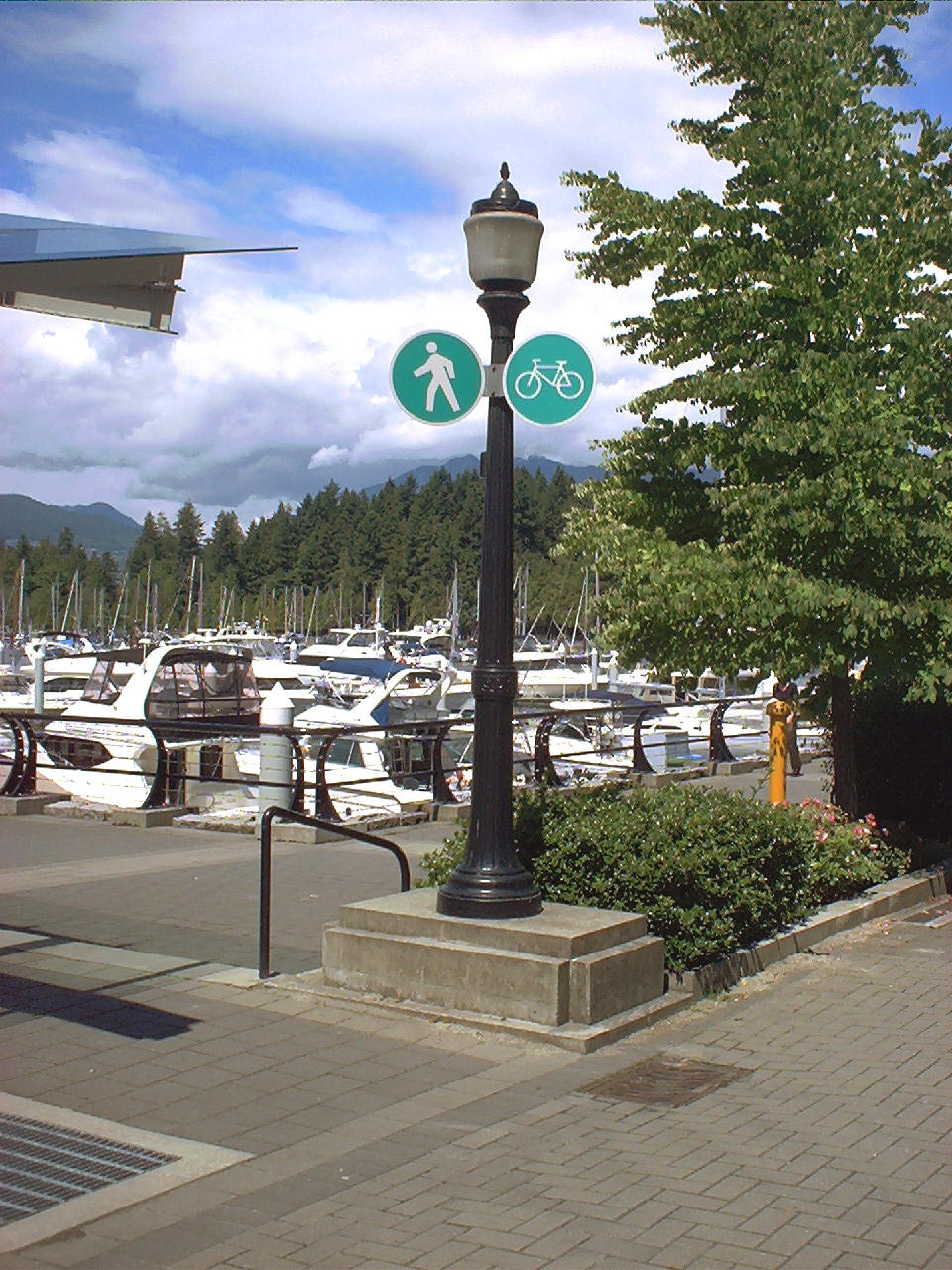
Trans Canada Trail along Coal Harbour in downtown Vancouver, British Columbia

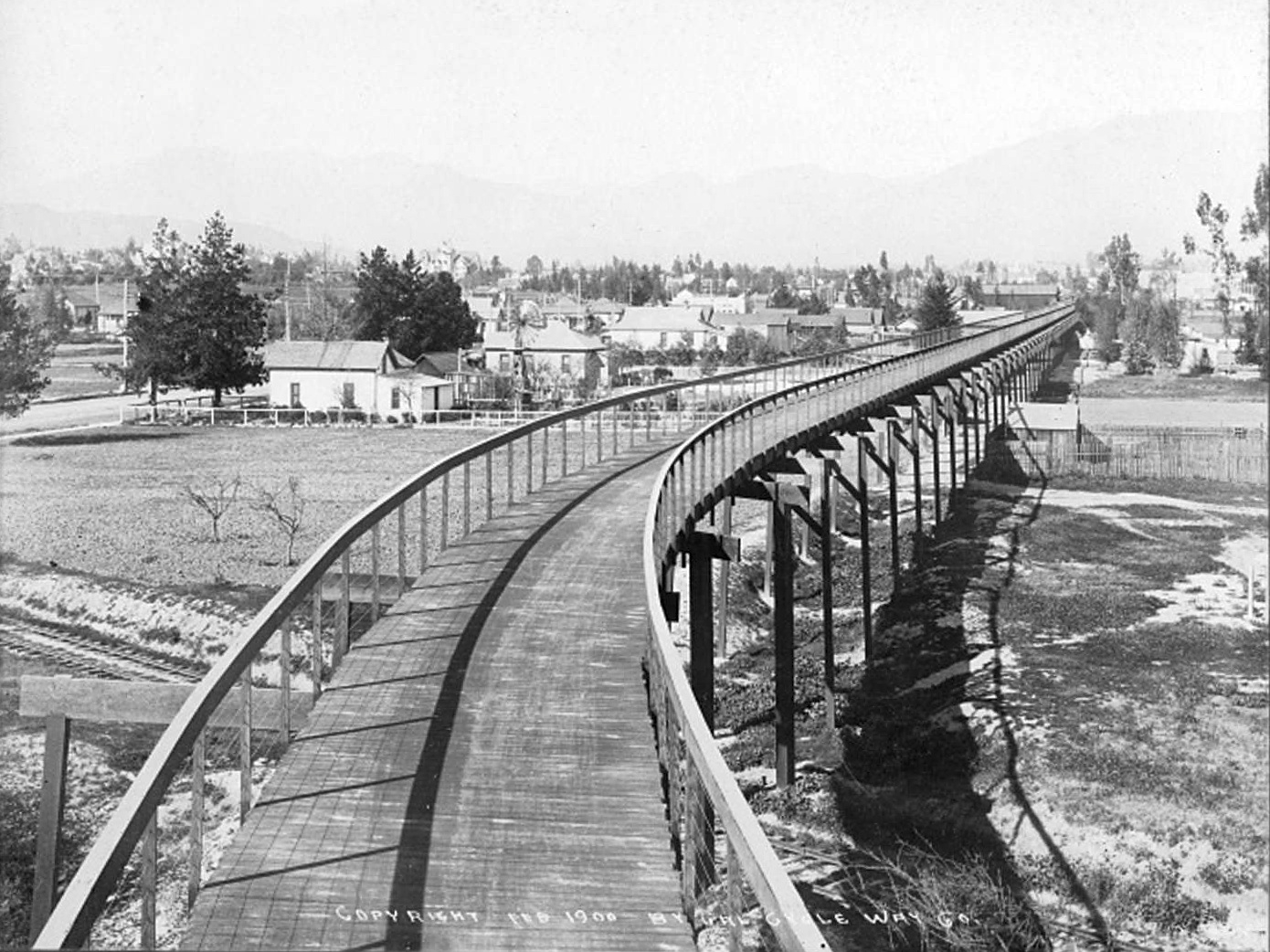
Cycling in Los Angeles, California, Cycleway in 1900

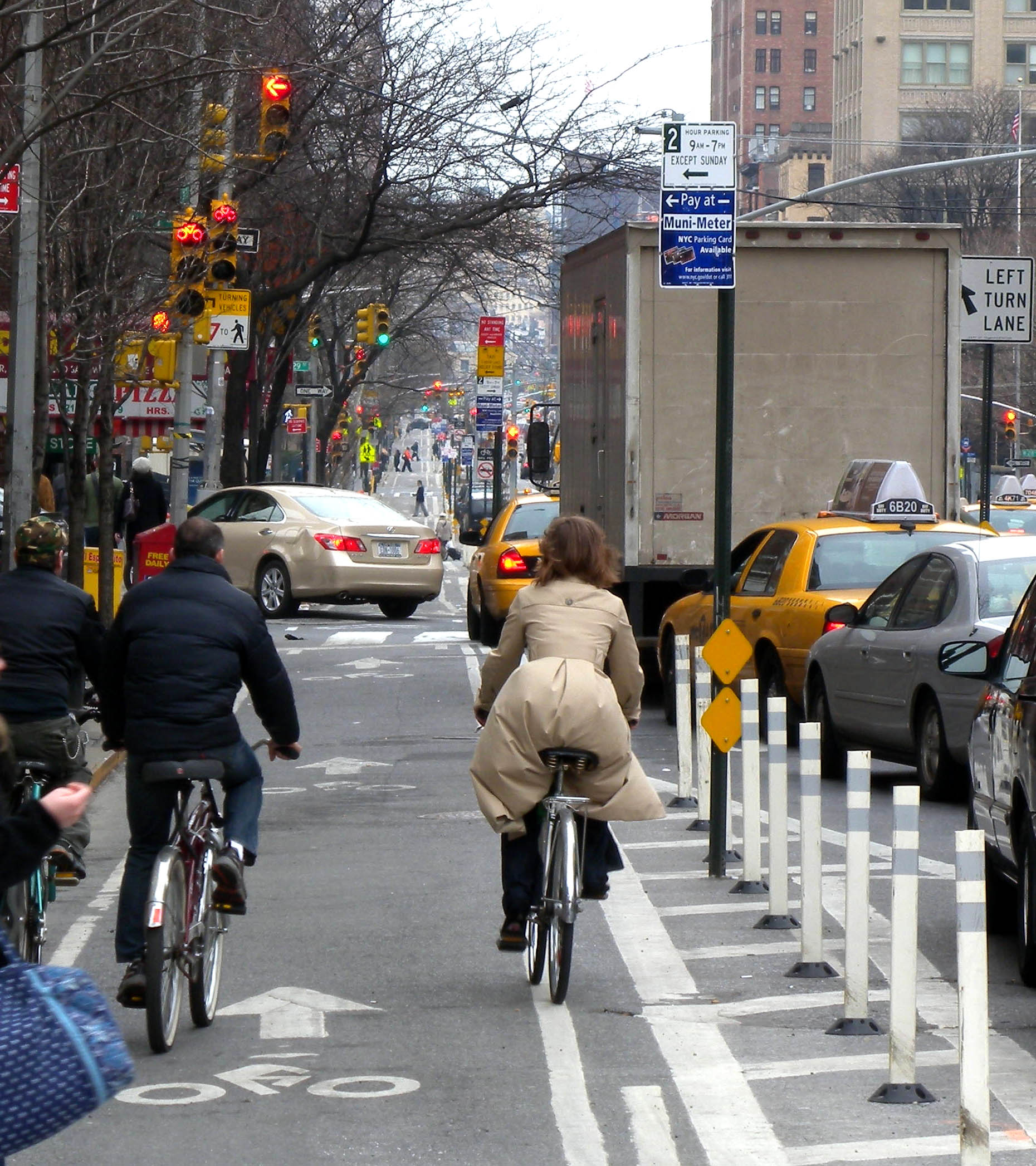
Cycling in New York City

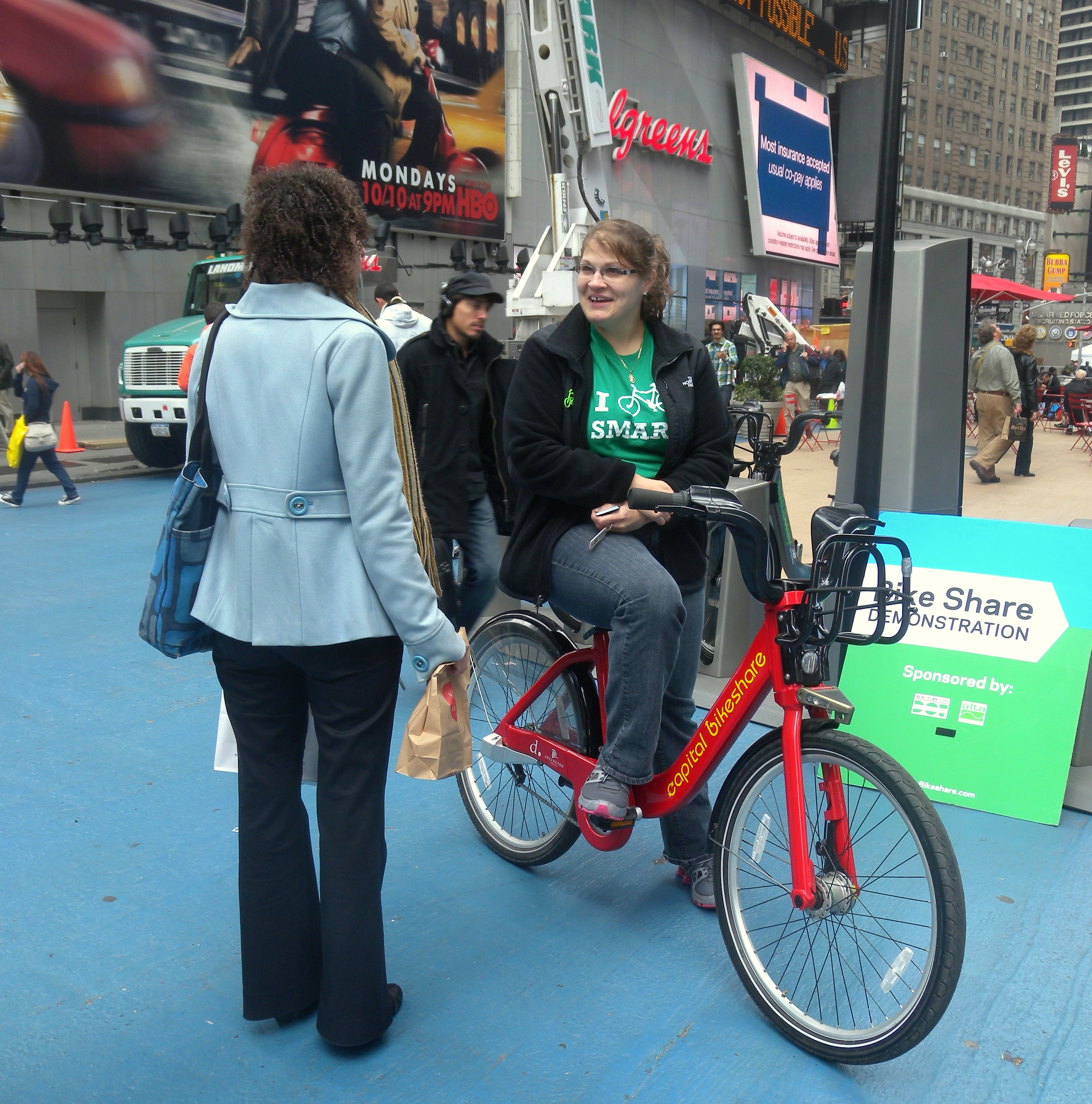
New York City Times Square bicycle sharing system

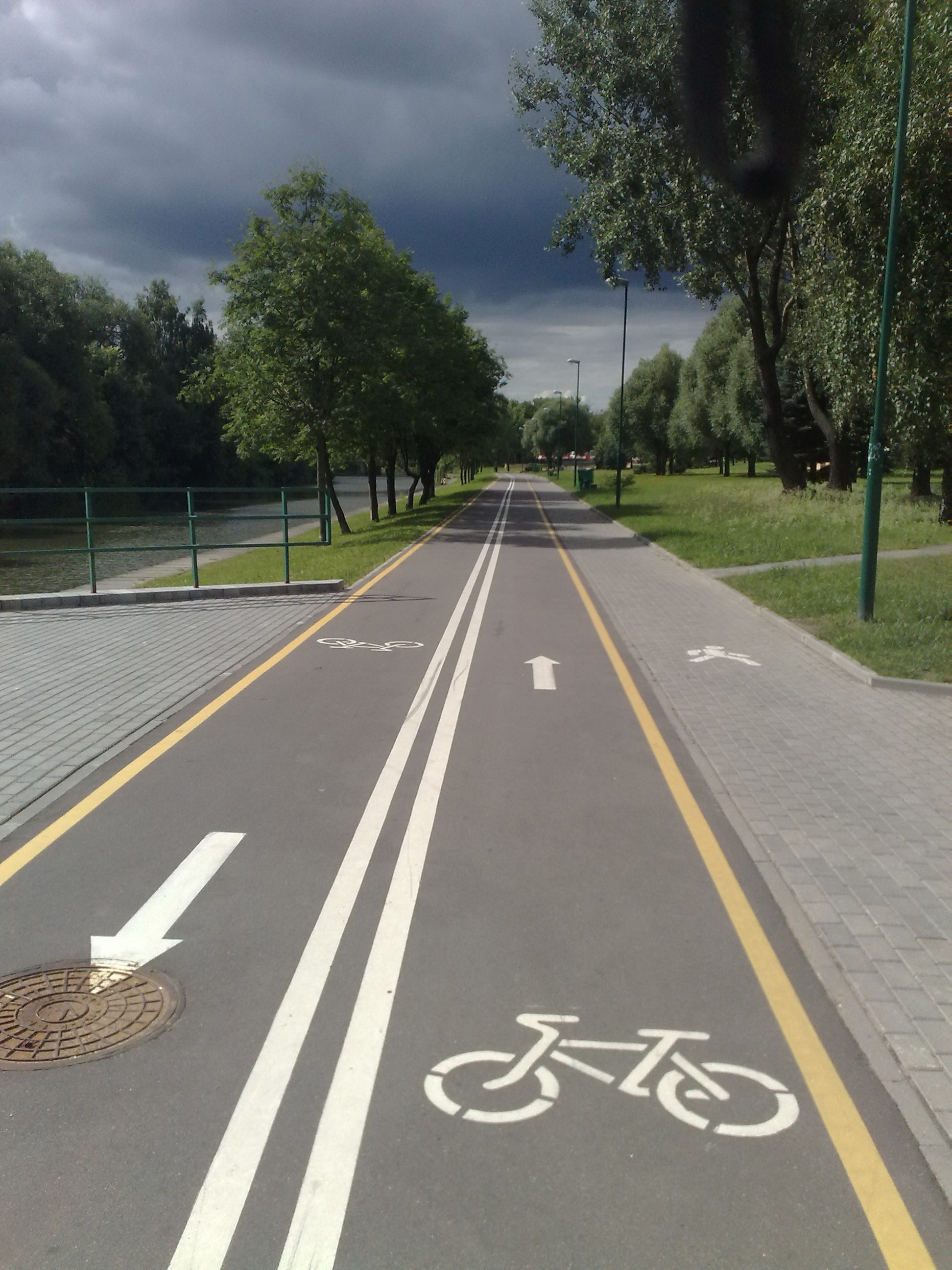
Bikeway in Minsk

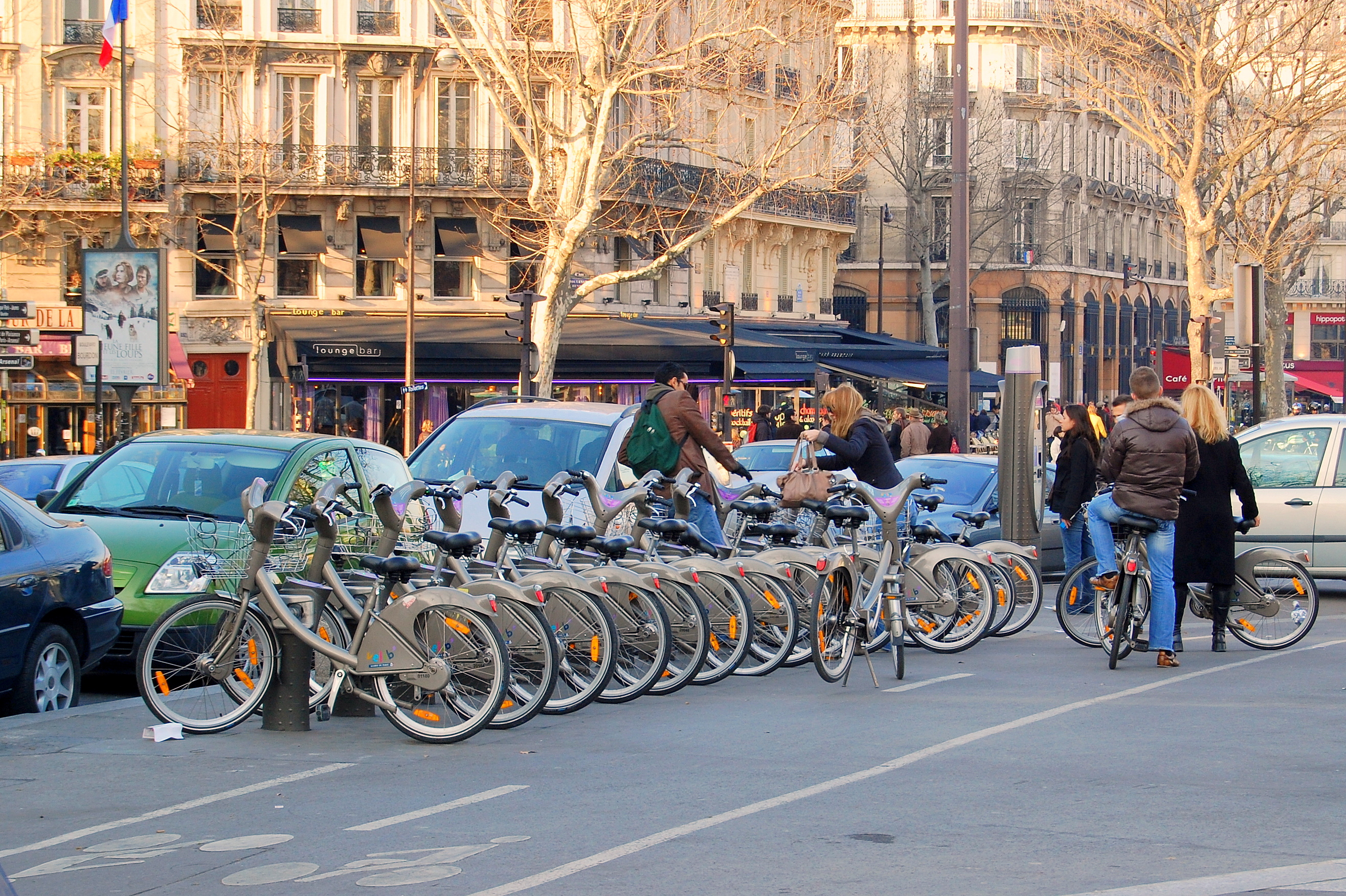
Vélib' station in Paris, France

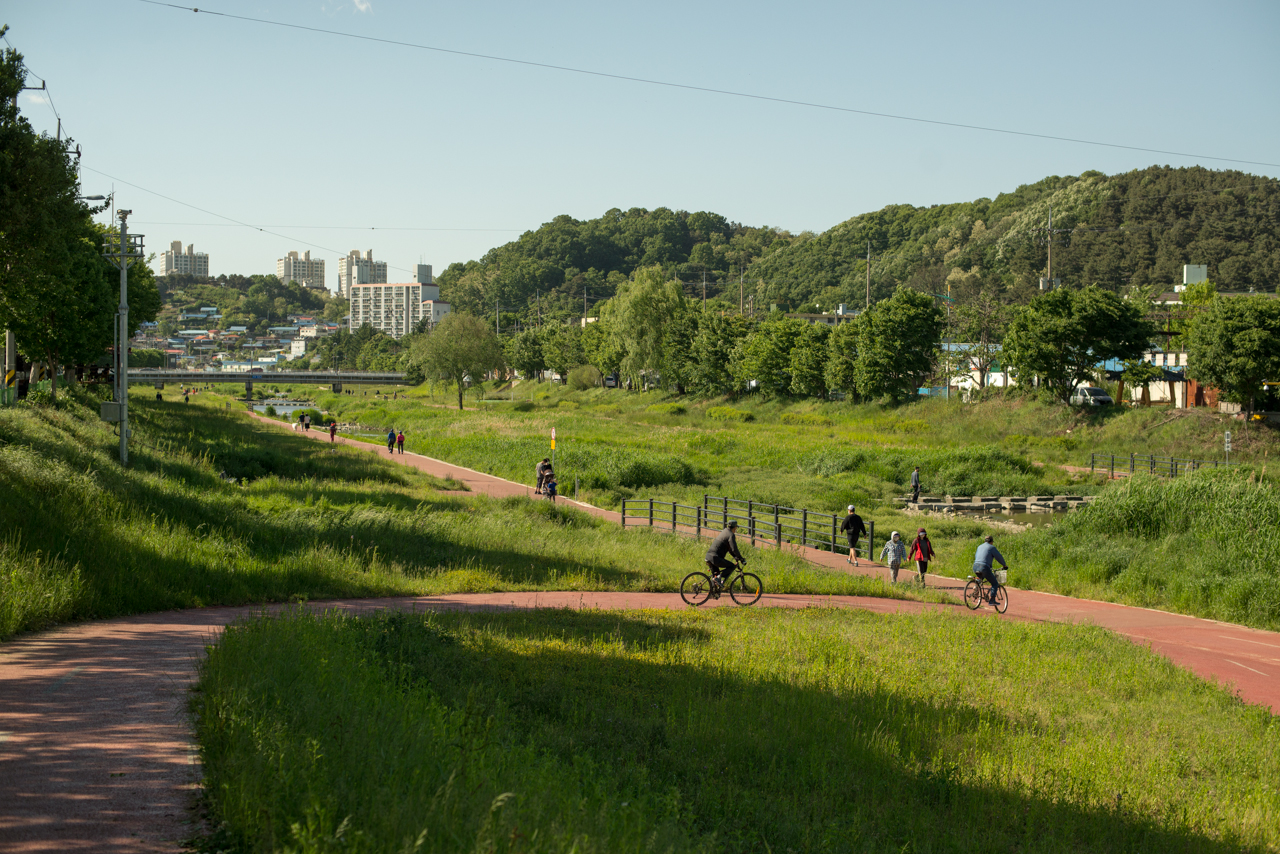
Bikeway in Daejeon, Korea

== See also ==
- Bicycle bridge
- Bicycle parking station – Building or structure for bicycle parking
- Bicycle stairway
- Cyclability – Degree of ease of cycling
- Cycling ecosystem – Set of physical, social and cultural elements that favor the use of bicycles
- Cycling network – Interconnected network of cycle routes
- History of cycling infrastructure
- Outline of cycling – Overview and topical guide
- Rail trail – Former railway trackbeds now used as recreational trails
- Road reallocation – Land route
- Removal of curbside parking spaces – Urban area absent of motor vehicles : frees up space for bicycle lanes
- Safety of cycling infrastructure – Overview of bicycle safety concerns
- Shared space – Roads unsegregated by travel mode
- Street reclamation – Changing streets to focus on non-car use

Organizing bodies:

- Adventure Cycling Association – American nonprofit member organization
- National Association of City Transportation Officials – North American association

Multi-modal road safety:

- Assured clear distance ahead – Safe driving distance between cars
