= Effective Cycling =

Vehicular cycling education

Effective Cycling is a trademarked cycling educational program designed by John Forester, which was the national education program of the League of American Wheelmen for a number of years until Forester withdrew permission for them to use the name.

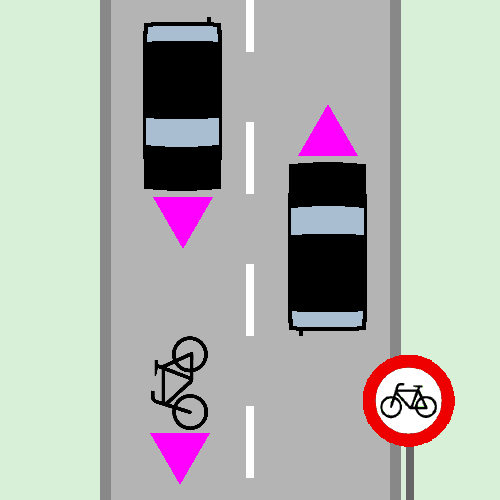

It is also the name of Forester's book (first published in 1976 and revised numerous times since then) on the topic. The program consists of textbooks and training courses (for both students and instructors) and a training video for students. The central teaching of the program is vehicular cycling practices. The primary recommendation is that a bicyclist, as an operator of a pedal vehicle, should follow the rules of the road that are common to all vehicle types. Forester argues that behaving otherwise actually increases the likelihood of collisions with other vehicles.

== Principles ==
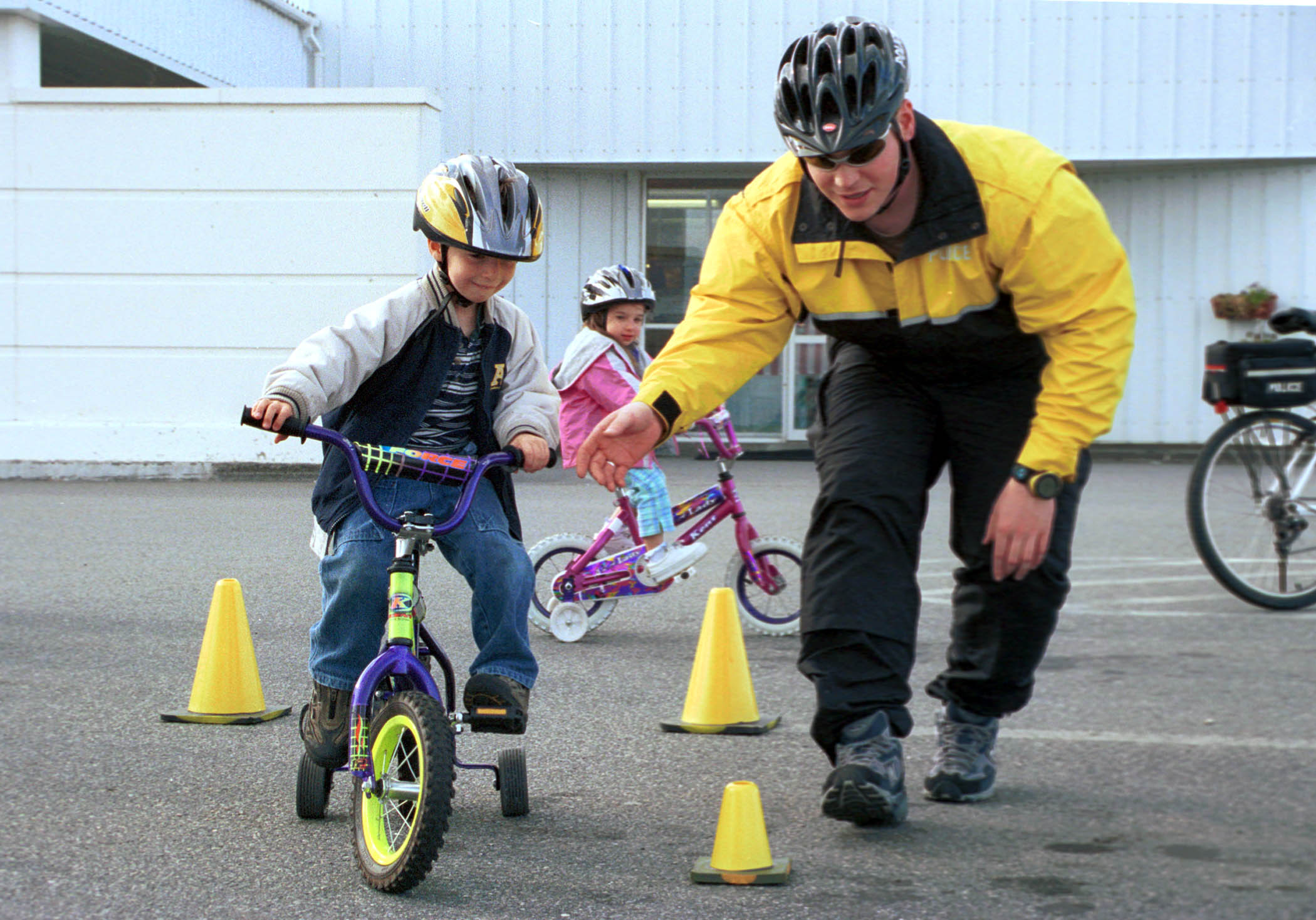

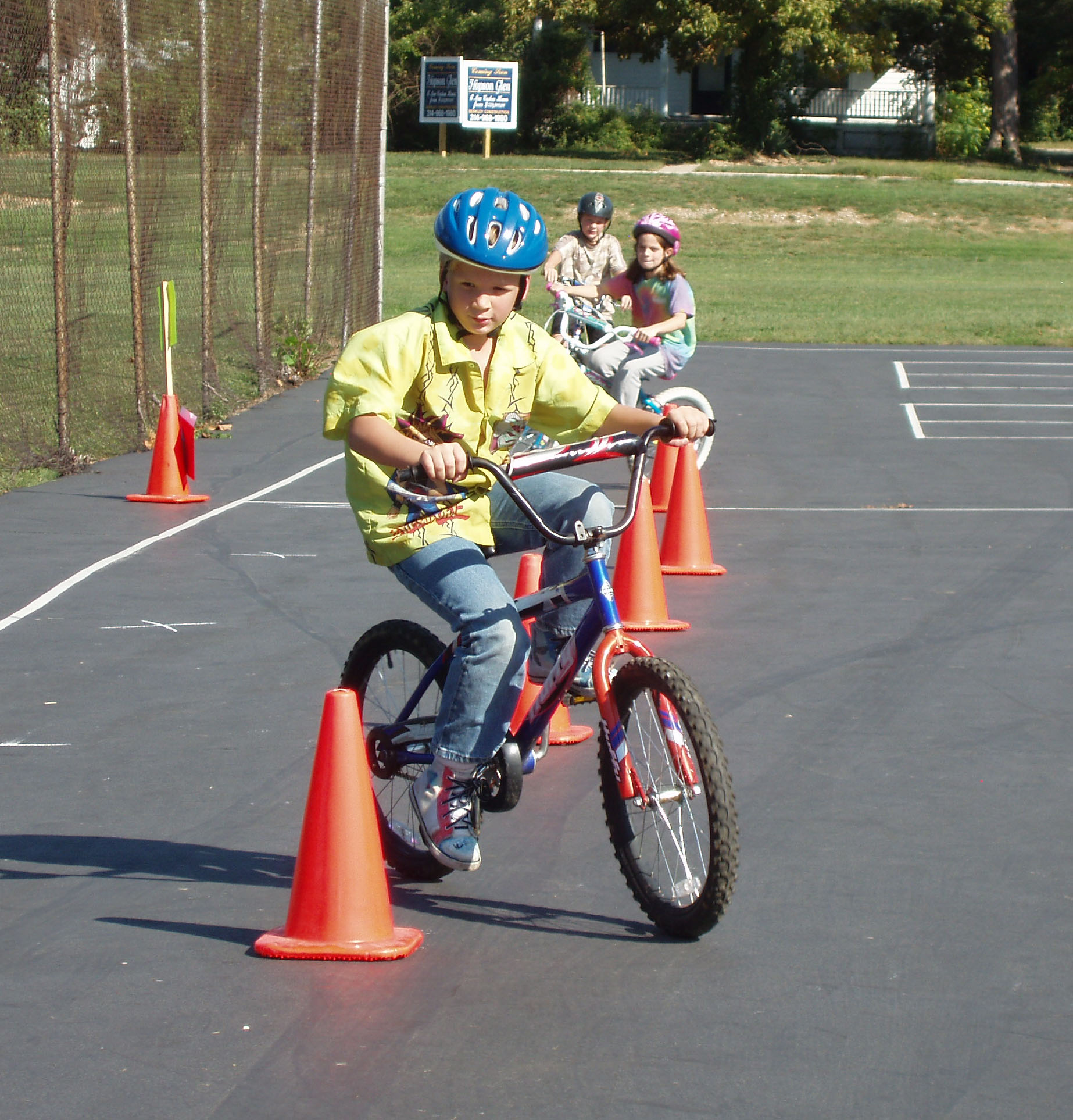

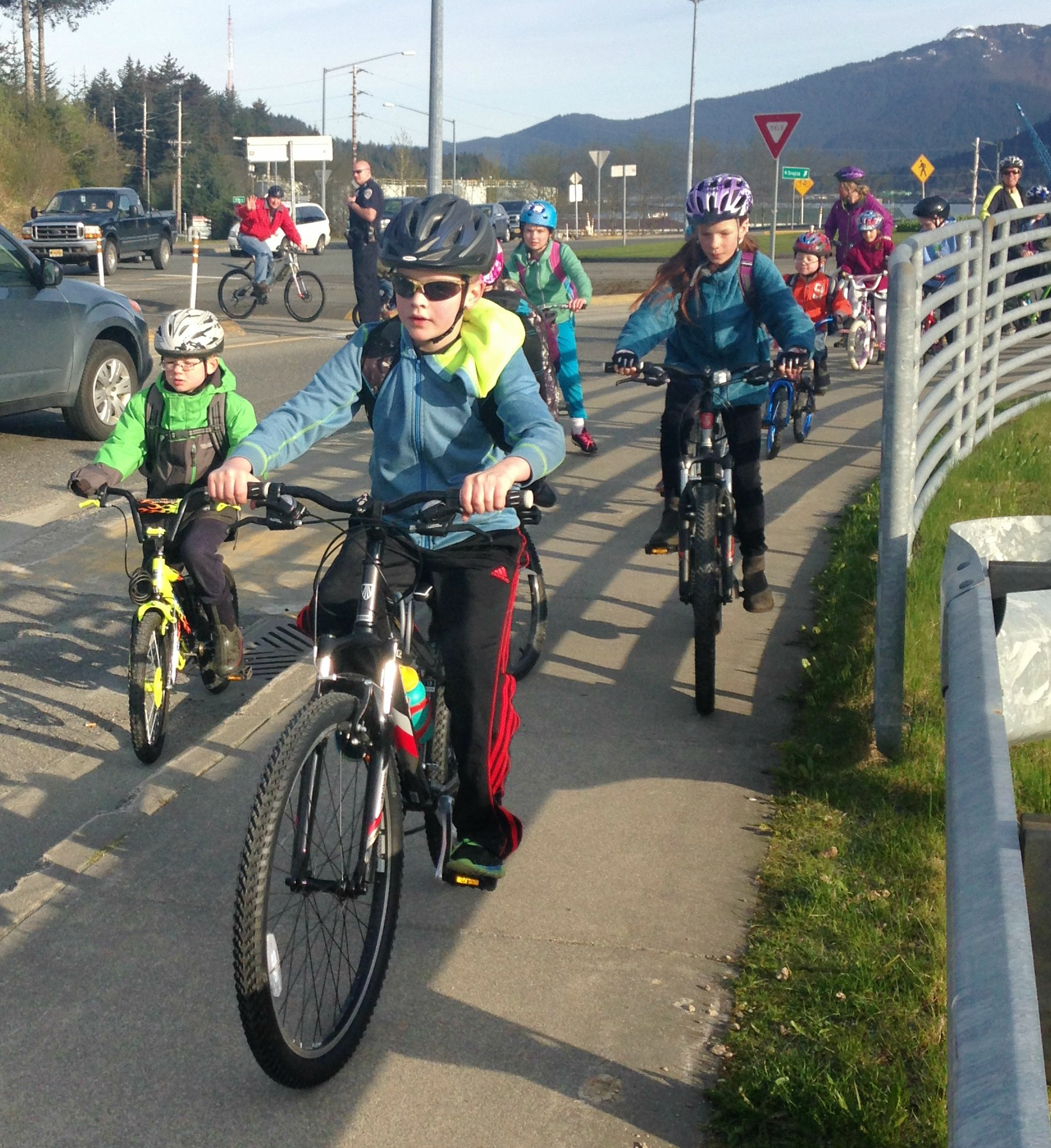

Forester summarizes the rules of the road for vehicle operation in five principles:

1. Use the correct half of the road, and not the sidewalk.
2. Yield to other traffic as required.
3. Yield when moving laterally across the road.
4. Choose the correct lane and position within the lane at intersections and their approaches, based on your destination. For example, a cyclist planning to go straight through an intersection should avoid getting stuck in a right-turn-only lane, where it is easy to get clobbered by a right-turning car; a cyclist in a through-traffic lane may get a few surprised looks but will probably not get hit. Choosing the correct lane and position often involves taking the lane when the lane is not wide enough for a car and a bike side by side.
5. Between intersections move away from the curb based on speed relative to other traffic and effective lane width.

Forester sums up Effective Cycling with what he calls the vehicular cycling (VC) principle: "Cyclists fare best when they act and are treated as drivers of vehicles." This injunction is consistent with the rules of the road, which generally apply to all types of drivers of vehicles. The VC principle is often misunderstood to mean "act like you're a car". At most, it means to act like a driver of a low-powered motorcycle. Forester's injunction speaks not only to cyclist behavior but also to the way cyclists should be treated by motorists, police, and road engineers.

== Opposition to segregated cycling ==
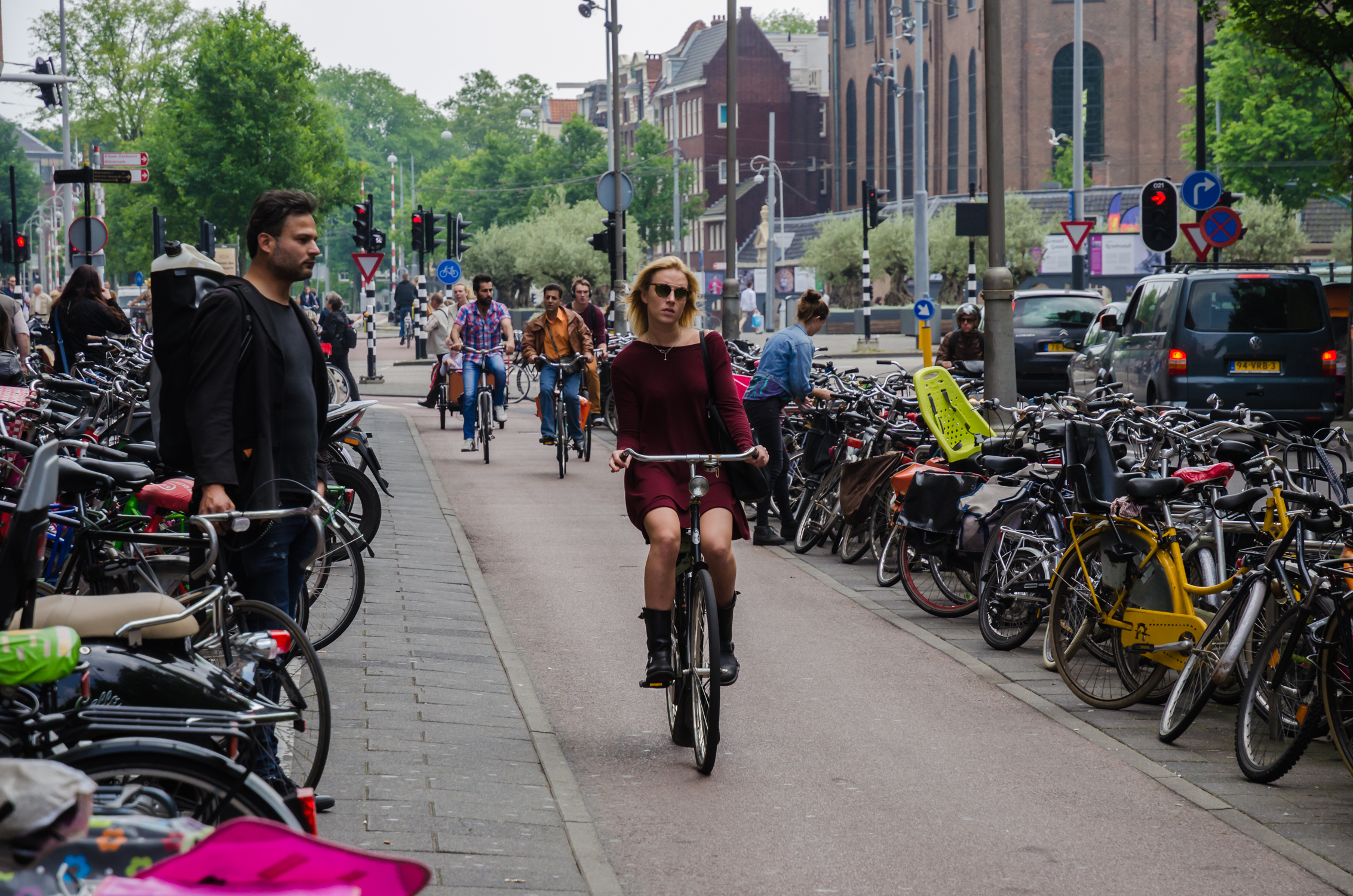
Segregated cycling along a Fietspad in Amsterdam

Forester generally opposes segregated cycle facilities (such as bicycle lanes) which he contends encourage behavior that is contrary to the vehicular cycling practices. This contention is challenged by those who believe that such facilities increase cyclist safety, such as the authors of a meta-study on cycle infrastructure safety research at the University of British Columbia, who have publicly stated that "In comparison to cycling on bicycle-specific infrastructure (paths, lanes, routes), on-road cycling appears to be less safe." However, that study also concludes that "sidewalks and multi-use trails pose the highest risk" and Forester has published a reply.

Forester's contention is also supported by some studies in Europe and the US, including a 2012 evaluation of bicycle facilities by the District of Columbia Department of Transportation, which found that crashes increased by up to a factor of two after installing bicycle tracks. The Transport Research Laboratory's 2011 literature review found that "evidence suggests that the points at which segregated networks intersect with highways offer heightened risk, potentially of sufficient magnitude to offset the safety benefits of removing cyclists from contact with vehicles in other locations." A 2008 study commissioned by the Copenhagen Municipality noted that "cycle tracks constructed have resulted in increases in accidents and injuries of 9–10% on the reconstructed roads." A Danish 2008 study conducted by the Traffic Research Group of Aalborg University's Department of Development and Planning concluded that "the main results are that bicycle paths impair traffic safety and this is mainly due to more accidents at intersections." This, however, may be due to an overall increase in bicycle traffic, another consequence of the installation of segregated cycling facilities.

== See also ==
- Bikeability
  - Cyclecraft
