= CAN-BIKE =

Canadian cycling skills course

CAN-BIKE is a Canadian cycling skills course offered across the country by Cycling Canada Cyclisme. It is a nationally standardized series of courses on all aspects of cycling safety oriented toward recreational and utilitarian cycling. The courses are taught by certified cycling instructors, and through a variety of organizations who are interested in education, safety and health.

CAN-BIKE follows the basic philosophy of vehicular cycling, which owes much of its approach to the ideas of John Forester.
