= Vehicular cycling =

Practice of riding bicycles on roads while obeying roadway rules

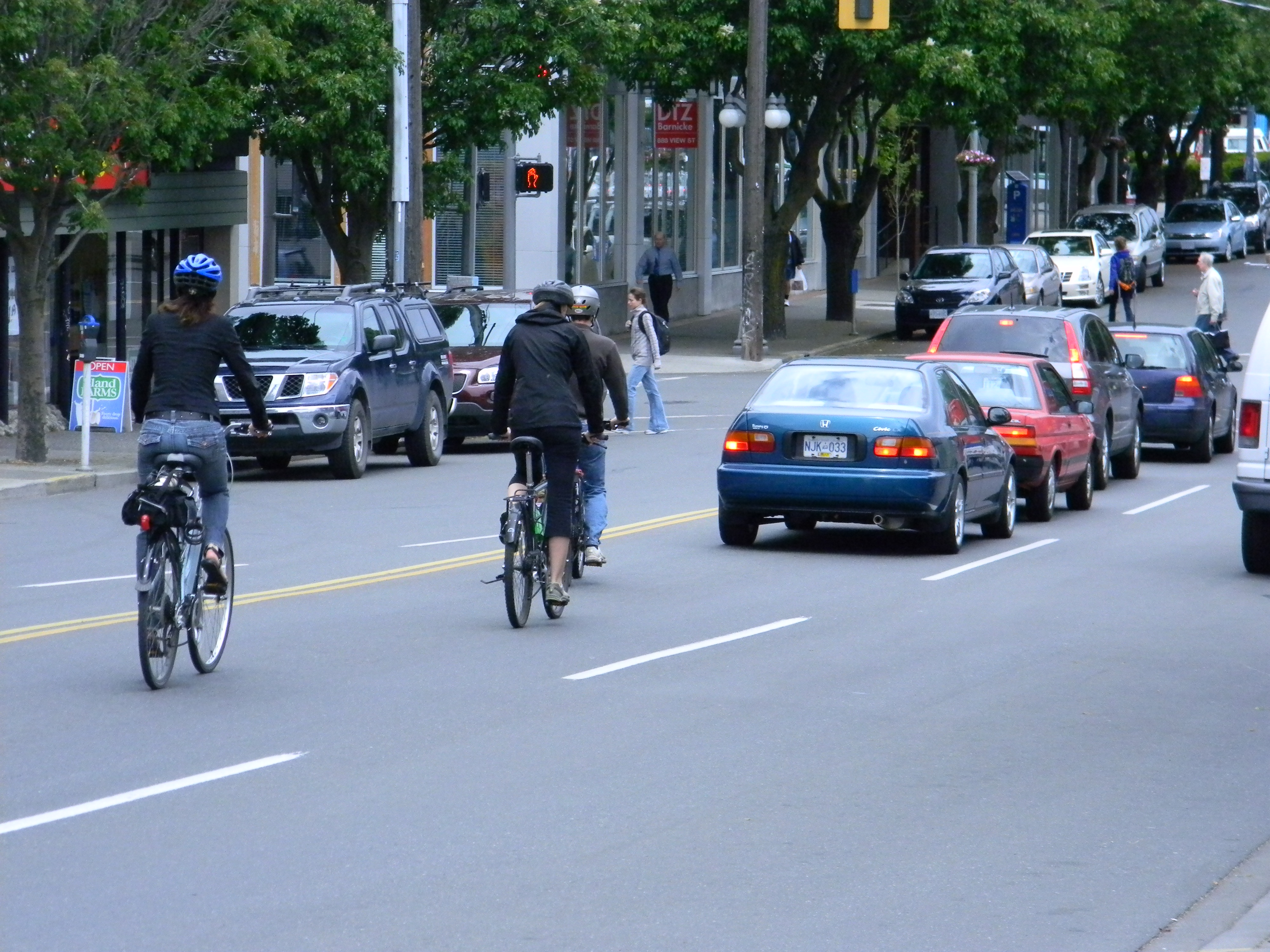
Cyclists on a road in Victoria, British Columbia

Vehicular cycling (also known as bicycle driving) is the practice of riding a bicycle in traffic in a manner that emulates driving a motor vehicle. The phrase vehicular cycling was coined by John Forester in the 1970s. In his book Effective Cycling, Forester contends that "Cyclists fare best when they act and are treated as drivers of vehicles".

These techniques have been adopted by the League of American Bicyclists and other organizations teaching riding courses for cyclists. As a method for riders to cope with fast motor traffic, many recommendations of vehicular cycling are widely applied. Vehicular cycling is controversial, particularly on larger roads not designed for bikes.

== Technique ==
A vehicular cyclist is one that travels within the roadway in accordance with the basic vehicular rules of the road that are shared by all drivers and adhering to traffic controls. (Note: Such as yield (give way) signs, stop signs and traffic lights.) Vehicular cyclists, Forester advises, should feel and act like vehicle drivers, and should smoothly and safely flow with other vehicles. (Note: In Bicycle Transportation, Forester writes that "there is much more to the vehicular-cycling principle than only obeying the traffic laws for drivers. The vehicular-style cyclist not only acts outwardly like a driver, he knows inwardly that he is one. Instead of feeling like a trespasser on roads owned by cars he feels like just another driver with a slightly different vehicle, one who is participating and cooperation in the organized mutual effort to get to desired destinations with the least trouble.")

In Effective Cycling, Forester introduced what he calls "the five basic principles of cycling in traffic". (Note: Forester asserts that "If you obey these five principles, you can cycle in many places you want to go with a low probability of creating traffic conflicts. You won't do everything in the best possible way, and you won't yet know how to get yourself out of troubles that other drivers may cause, but you will still do much better than the average American bicyclist.")

- Ride on the road, with the direction of traffic. (Note: For cycling in particular, collisions at intersections (defined broadly as "not only the junction of two roadways, but also points where driveways, sidewalks, or paths meet a roadway, or where sidewalks or paths meet a driveway") while traveling in the wrong direction against traffic has been determined to be over three times more likely for wrong-way cyclists. Wrong-way cycling increases closing speeds and wrong-way cyclists are easily overlooked by motorists at intersections. Wrong-way cycling also makes bike-bike collisions more likely.)
- Yield to crossing traffic at junctions with larger roads.
- Yield to traffic in any lane you are moving to, or when you are moving laterally on the road.
- Position yourself appropriately at junctions when turning — near the curb when turning off the road on the side you are travelling on, near the center line when turning across the other side of the road, (Note: Depending which side of the road traffic moves on, this may be turning left or right. Forester's book, being written in the United States, assumes traffic driving on the right.) and in the center when continuing straight on.
- Ride in a part of the road appropriate to your speed; typically, faster traffic is near the center line.

=== Lane control ===
The Bicycles May Use Full Lane sign in the U.S. Federal Highway Administration's Manual on Uniform Traffic Control Devices may be used when lanes are too narrow for safe vehicle-bicycle side-by-side sharing.

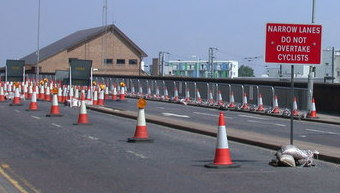
This sign indicates that there is not sufficient space for safe vehicle-bicycle side-by-side sharing.

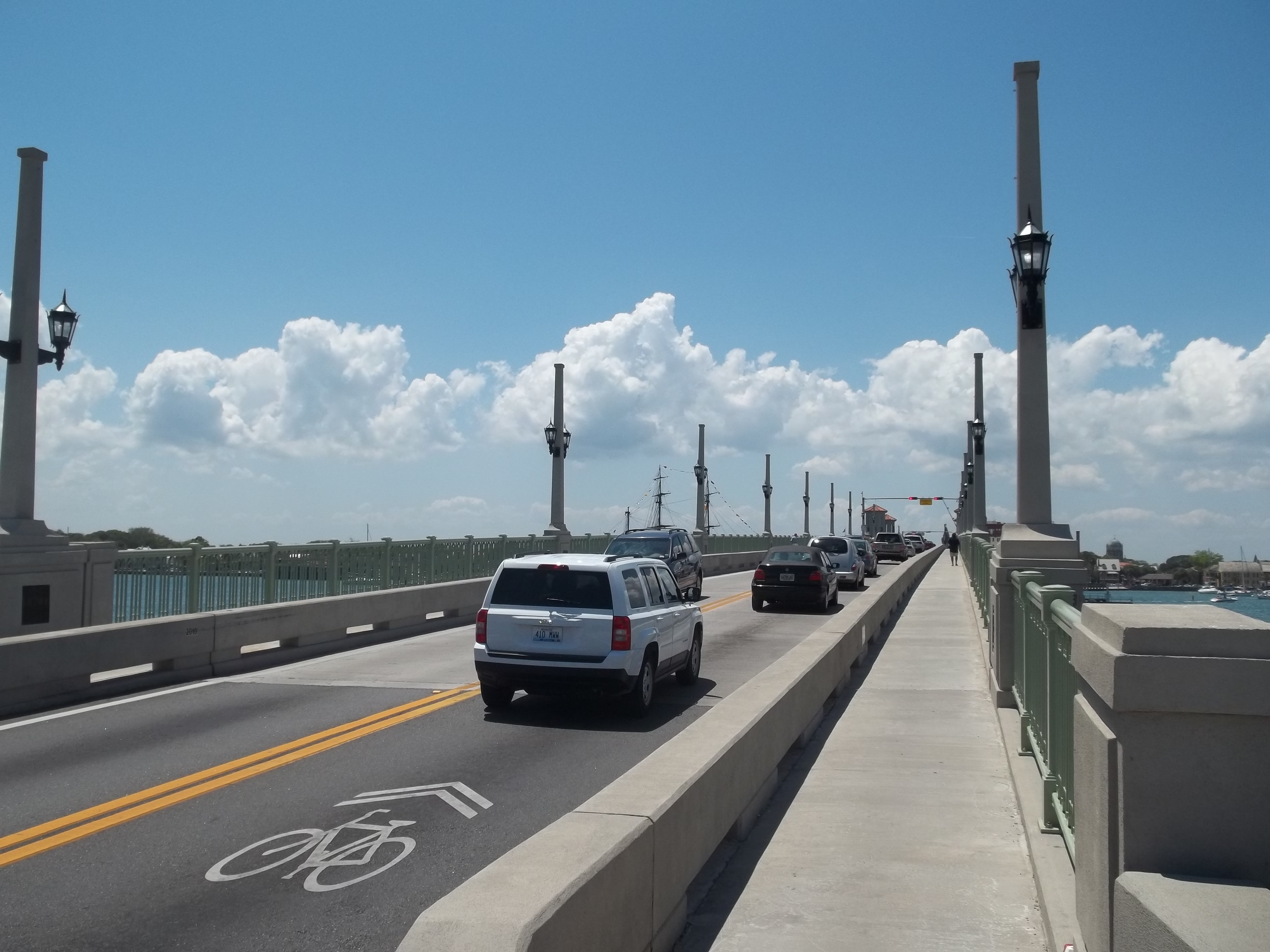
Shared Lane Marking, called a Sharrow, which has a similar function to the message shown above

Lane control is the practice of controlling a lane (also known as "using the full lane" or "taking the lane") to enhance safety. Controlling the lane is asserting control of the space one needs to be much more conspicuous (as compared to riding relatively inconspicuously near the road edge) to traffic ahead as well as behind, to be further from edge hazards, to preclude another vehicle from passing dangerously close within the same lane, and encouraging drivers of overtaking vehicles to change lanes when they pass.

=== Lane sharing ===
Due to the relatively narrow nature of bicycles, road lanes are sometimes wide enough to allow them to safely share lanes side by side with motor vehicles. In lanes where this is possible, vehicular cycling suggests riding about 1 metre (3.3 ft) to the outside of overtaking traffic and about the same distance from roadside hazards such as the gutter seam. Cyclists can also filter forward past stopped motor traffic. Where they exist, wide outside lanes may also be shared in order to facilitate being overtaken by faster traffic.

When riding in a lane sharing position, vehicular cycling, because it is based on following the rules of the road for drivers of vehicles, specifies that cyclists must yield to overtaking traffic using the other part of the lane, or obtain right-of-way to move over through signaling/negotiation before moving laterally into that space. For example, California's CVC 22107 Rule of the Road specifies, "No person shall turn a vehicle from a direct course or move right or left upon a roadway until such movement can be made with reasonable safety and then only after the giving of an appropriate signal." Any cyclist who moves into lane space used by overtaking traffic without signaling and yielding until safe would be in violation of CVC 22107 in California, or in violation of similar rules of the road in other jurisdictions.

=== Speed and destination positioning ===
Vehicular cyclists use "speed positioning" between intersections. The basic principle is "slower traffic keeps to the outside; faster traffic to the inside". When lanes are marked, vehicular cyclists generally operate in the outermost travel lane. When lanes are not marked, vehicular cyclists generally operate as far to the outside of the traveled way as is reasonably efficient and safe.

As vehicular cyclists approach a junction of ways, the principle of "destination positioning" comes into play, and they should position themselves laterally according to their destination (left, straight or right):

- Where lanes are marked, vehicular cyclists approaching a junction should choose the outermost lane that serves their destination.
- When lanes are not marked, vehicular cyclists approaching a junction will travel along the inside of their side of the road if turning toward the inside, along the outer side if turning to the outside, and in between if going straight.

Vehicular cyclists do not avoid riding in bicycle lanes, rather they decide whether to ride in the space demarcated as a bike lane based on their own judgement about safety. They are also advised to stay outside of the door zone; when passing motor vehicles that are parked parallel to the road, no closer than the largest estimated width of an open door, plus some margin for error.

The cycling skills manual Cyclecraft, the foundation of Bikeability, the UK's national standard for cycle training, defines the terms primary riding position, where the cyclist will be more visible and predictable to motor vehicle traffic, as being in the center of the traffic lane, and secondary riding position as being 1 metre (3.3 ft) to the side of moving traffic, but not closer than 0.5 metres (1.6 ft) from the edge of the road. It states that it is sensible to use the primary riding position as the normal position, only using the secondary riding position when it is safe, reasonable, and necessary to allow faster traffic to pass.

On multi-lane roadways, some vehicular cyclists ride on the inside of the outermost lane (on the side furthest from the road edge in the lane nearest the road edge), for enhanced visibility to motor vehicle traffic. This position may be indicated by road markings. (Note: In Salt Lake City, this left-of-center position is painted by the City in green along with shared lane markings on several downtown roadways.)

=== Looking back ===
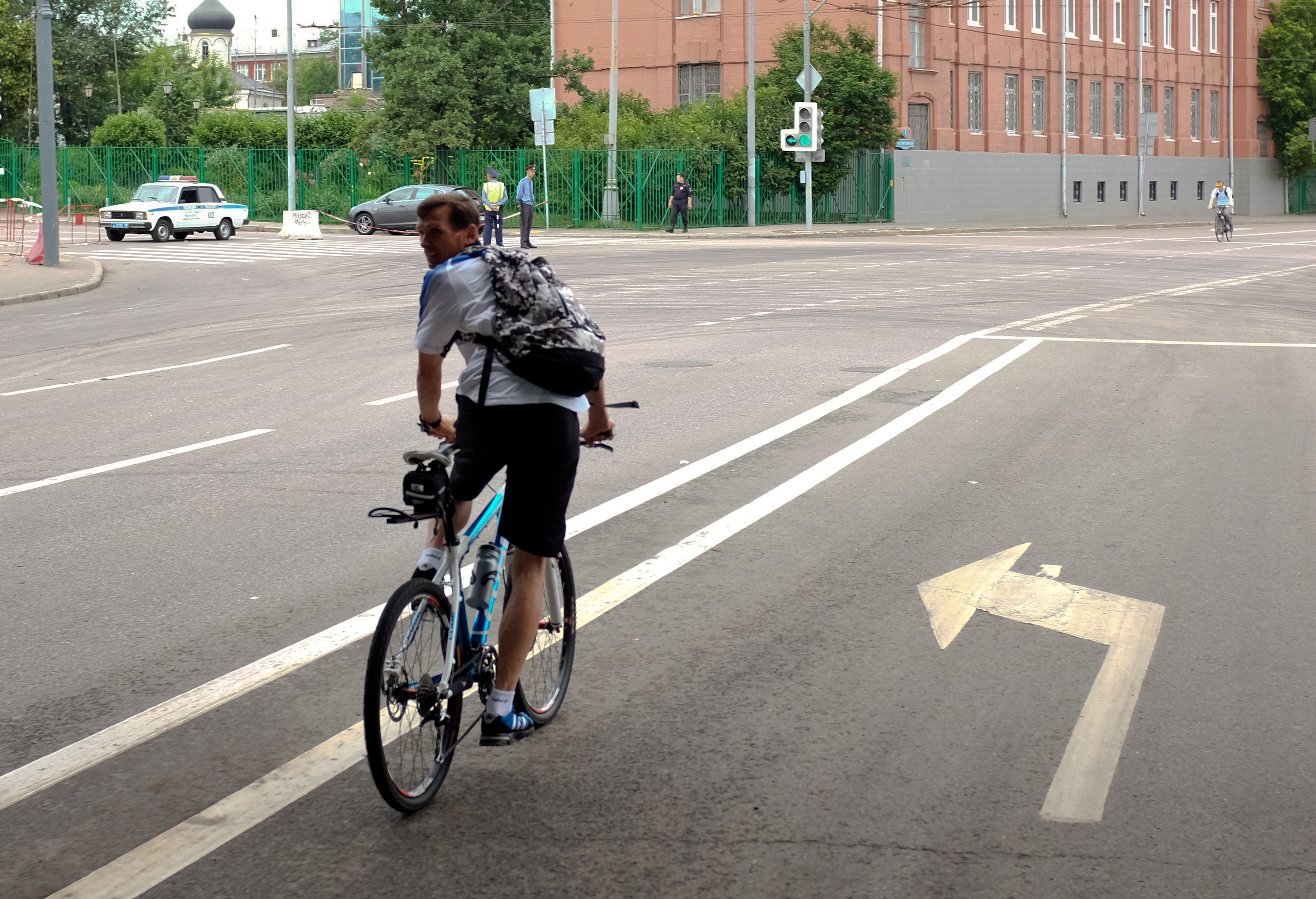
A cyclist looking back over his shoulder at an intersection

Cyclists may look backwards over their shoulder to:

1. maintain awareness of other vehicles on the road
2. safely navigate and merge with other traffic
3. broadcast the cyclist's desire (to move laterally or turn) to other road users so that they can better predict the cyclist's path
4. see if someone who is overtaking is about to make a mistake and enter the cyclist's path

Particularly in slow traffic, a cyclist's look to the rear may serve as a signal, allowing the cyclist to keep both hands on the handlebar. However, a cyclist may also use a hand signal (arm extended to the side) to request that an overtaking driver make room. The cyclist then follows up with a second look to the rear to assure that the driver has made room.

=== Negotiation ===
Negotiation is a technique for cyclists to safely traverse one or more lanes by merging in with the flow of other traffic. The basic method is to negotiate for the use of the adjacent lane, move into that lane, and then repeat the process for any additional lanes. The cyclist moves only when there is a natural gap in motor traffic to move into, or after someone slows down explicitly to allow them to move over.

The steps of the process for each lane change are:

1. Look back for traffic that may be overtaking in the target lane.
2. Wait for a sufficient gap to change lanes. Ideally, make eye contact with the other driver and use a hand signal to request an approaching driver in the target lane to yield right of way by slowing down and leaving unoccupied space in the lane in front of them.
3. Move into the lane and control it.

== Assessment ==
=== Endorsement ===
Some sport cyclists prefer to ride in car lanes when possible, instead of separate bike paths, as it allows them to ride at higher speeds without the need to worry about interference from other cyclists. Therefore they are the most vocal proponents of bicycling in traffic and tend to vehemently oppose any initiative to segregate cycling from motor vehicles or the implementation of other cycling infrastructure. They claim that vehicular cycling reduces the risk of collision with motorists compared to a strong separation of road users.

=== Criticism ===
The movement surrounding vehicular cycling has been criticized for its effect on bicycle advocacy in general. In Pedaling Revolution, Jeff Mapes states that Forester "fought bike lanes, European-style cycletracks, and just about any form of traffic calming", and "saw nothing wrong with sprawl and an auto-dependent lifestyle." Zack Furness is highly critical of vehicular cyclists in One Less Car: Bicycling and the Politics of Automobility, arguing that their criticism of 'political' cyclists "totally ignores all the relevant socioeconomic, physical, material, and cultural factors that influence—and in most cases dictate—everyday transportation choices." Critical Mass co-founder Chris Carlsson describes vehicular cycling as a naïve, polarizing "ideology" that "essentially advocates bicyclists should strive to behave like cars on the streets of America." The makeup of vehicular cycling advocates as a group in the United States was criticized for being typically club cyclists, middle-aged wealthy suburbanite, overwhelmingly white, representing a social and economic elite that were able to dominate public discussions of cycle planning issues.

Many governmental and professional organizations emphasize differences between a person driving a car and a person riding a bicycle and consider separated bicycle facilities to be best practice for promoting safety.

=== Distracted driving ===
The rise of cell phone distracted driving has increased the chance that if a motorist is drifting into a shoulder or bike lane, it is because they are not paying attention. Accordingly, if a cyclist attempts to ride where a motorist is drifting in order to "reclaim their right of way", it is likely that they will not be seen. Citing the rise in U.S. crash fatalities, David Dudley at CityLab wrote, "the swift erosion of America's driving abilities is yet another reason to admit that the cause of 'vehicular cycling'—the safe-biking philosophy that says bikes should ride assertively rather than cower at the side of the road—is increasingly compromised by reality."

=== Segregated cycling as an alternative ===
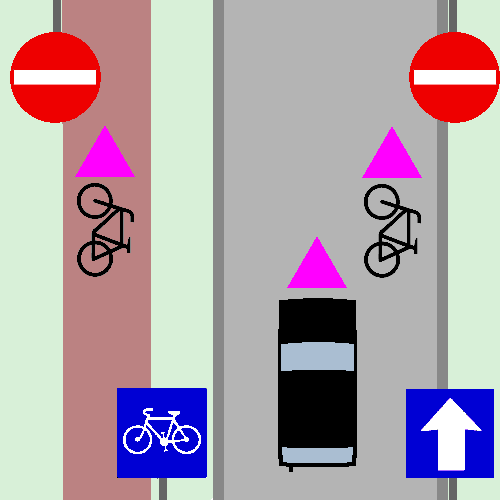
Segregated cycle facilities (both one-way roads)

Segregated cycle facilities exist in some areas, allowing cycling without sharing roads with motorized traffic. Cities that are structured that way report a high degree of bicycle usage and low injury rates, such as in the Netherlands. A 2001 study in Edmonton, Alberta, Canada, concluded that cyclists found 1 minute of cycling in mixed traffic as onerous as 4.1 minutes in bike lanes or 2.8 minutes on bike paths. A study of cyclists in Washington, D.C., found that cyclists were willing to spend on average 20.38 extra minutes per trip to travel on an off-street bicycle trail when the alternative was riding on a street with parked cars. Forester believes segregated cycle facilities to be more dangerous than on-road cycling due to increase risk from crossing conflicts and that, in the case of sidepaths, they can only be used safely by cycling "very slowly" Urban planning professor John Pucher writes that "Forester makes a number of theoretical arguments why bikeways are unsafe." Forester objects to rejection of his test results.

Pucher's various transnational studies of bicycle transportation lead him to conclude that "the overwhelming evidence is that cycling is much safer and more popular precisely in those countries where bikeways, bike lanes, special intersection modifications, and priority traffic signals are the key to their bicycling policies." The authors of a 2009 meta-study on cycle infrastructure safety research at the University of British Columbia similarly conclude that "in comparison to cycling on bicycle-specific infrastructure (paths, lanes, routes), on-road cycling appears to be less safe."

Forester objects to Pucher's conclusions, primarily on the grounds that Pucher ascribes the increase in use of bikes and bike safety observed to the bikeways without showing that the bikeways are the actual cause of the increased use or safety.

Jennifer Dill and Theresa Carr's research on bicycle transportation in 35 U.S. cities also suggests that "higher levels of bicycle infrastructure are positively and significantly correlated with higher rates of bicycle commuting"; and a 2010 study comparing streets in Copenhagen that had had cycle tracks and bicycle lanes added to them found that cycling volume increased 20%. However, on the cycle track streets bicycle accidents increased 10%. Streets with bicycle lanes added saw a 5% increase in bicycle traffic but a 49% increase in bicycle accidents. Despite this, the study notes that "the gains in health from increased physical activity [from increased numbers cycling are] much, much greater than the losses in health resulting from a slight decline in road safety." Although prior studies did not differentiate between new bike riders and those that had changed routes due to the new facility, recent research has shown that the greater level of protection, the greater number of new bike riders (as opposed to riders who used the route before construction or shifted routes).

== See also ==
- CAN-BIKE, the Canadian vehicular cycling course
- Cyclability
- Smart Cycling, the League of American Bicyclists' vehicular cycling course
- Outline of cycling
- Utility cycling
- Stop-as-yield
