= Wide outside lane =

Shared lane of a roadway

A wide outside lane (WOL) or wide curb lane (WCL) is an outermost lane of a roadway that is wide enough to be safely shared side by side by a bicycle and a wider motor vehicle at the same time. The terms are used by cyclists and bicycle transportation planners in the United States. Generally, the minimum-width standard for a WOL in the US is 14 feet (4.3 m). A wide outside through lane (WOTL) is a WOL that is intended for use by through traffic.

Conversely, a narrow lane is a lane that is too narrow to be safely shared side by side by a bicycle and a motor vehicle. When the outside lane of a roadway is a narrow lane, it is sometimes referred as a narrow outside lane (NOL), narrow curb lane (NCL) or narrow outside through lane (NOTL).

== Legal definitions ==
The US Department of Transportation's Federal Highway Administration defines a "Shared Lane" as follows:

- Shared Lane – A lane of a traveled way that is open to bicycle travel and motor vehicle use.
  - Narrow Lane – A travel lane less than 14 feet in width, which therefore does not allow bicyclists and motorists to travel side-by-side within the same traffic lane and maintain a safe separation distance.
  - Wide Curb Lane – A travel lane at least 14 feet wide, adjacent to a curb, which allows bicyclists and motorists to travel side-by-side within the same traffic lane.

== Rules of the road ==
In some jurisdictions, the rules of the road apply differently for a cyclist when the roadway has a WOL or a NOL. For example, in the state of California all cyclists are legally required to ride "as close as practicable to the right-hand" side of the roadway when the lane is wide enough "for a bicycle and a vehicle to travel safely side by side within the lane." While California does not specify exactly what constitutes "wide enough", other states do. For example, the Texas version of this law states that riding "as near as practicable to the right" is not required when a variety of conditions are present, including when "the person is operating a bicycle in an outside lane that is less than 14 feet in width". Experts on vehicular cycling recommend that cyclists not share marked lanes that are not wide enough for efficient, safe, and lawful passing within the lane—that instead they should control such lanes (by riding in the middle) that are too narrow for safe side-by-side sharing by motor vehicle and bicycle both within the lane.

== Benefits and drawbacks ==
WOLs are generally considered to be facilities which primarily benefit cyclists; for a road marked with a bike lane, if the bike-lane stripe is removed, what remains is a WOL. Some vehicular cyclists and bike lane opponents advocate for WOLs instead of bike lanes, arguing that WOLs provide most, if not all, of the benefits, without many of the perceived drawbacks that bike lanes impose on people travelling by bicycle. Still others maintain that the primary purpose of providing the additional roadway width—whether in the form of a WOL or a bike lane—is to facilitate the passing of cyclists by motorists.

== See also ==
- Cycling infrastructure
- Lane
- Outside lane
- Shoulder (road)
