= Wotl =

WOTL or Wotl may refer to:

- Final Fantasy Tactics: War of the Lions, a tactical role-playing game developed and published by Square Enix for the PlayStation Portable
- Wide outside through lane, highway lane configuration used on United States roads; see wide outside lane
- WOTL, a radio station (90.3 FM) licensed to Toledo, Ohio, United States
