= Anti-cycling sentiment =

Hostility towards cyclists or cycling infrastructure

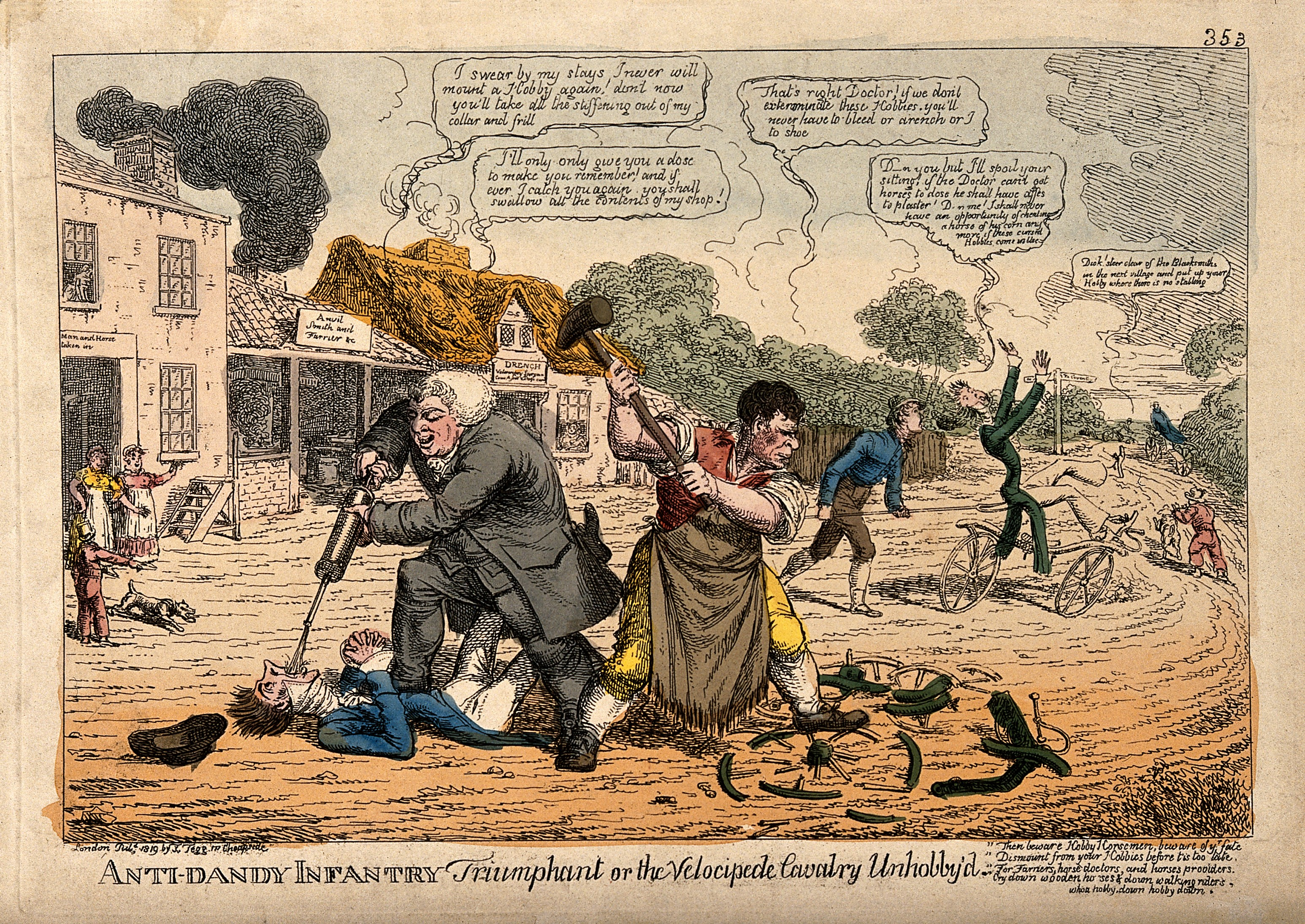
1819 British cartoon showing dandies on bicycles being attacked and insulted

Anti-cycling sentiment is hostility towards cyclists or opposition to cycling infrastructure, such as bike lanes. Anti-cycling sentiment is sometimes referred to as bikelash. Anti-cycling sentiment may result in harassment and violence against cyclists. Some populations, such as women cyclists or disabled cyclists, may experience targeted abuse. Anti-cycling sentiment first emerged in the 1800s, after the invention of the dandy horse and velocipede followed by the modern bicycle, with some jurisdictions restricting or banning bicycles due to conflicts with horse riders and pedestrians. Bikelash has been described as a moral panic. Controversies around dedicated cycling routes in cities are based on disagreements upon factors including design, safety, financing, road use, and maintenance. There is also debate over the extent to which cycle tracks and cycling routes encourage cycling compared to other factors.

== About ==
According to a 2023 survey, the United Kingdom has high levels of anti-cycling sentiment, with 45% of British people expressing a negative view of cycling. Only 20% of Polish people expressed a negative view of cycling.

In 1897, Columbus, Ohio Mayor Samuel Luccock Black referred to reckless cyclists as "evil".

=== Attempts to ban bicycles ===
During the 19th century, following the invention of the dandy horse and later the bicycle, conflicts emerged between cyclists and horse riders. Some horse riders called for bicycles to be banned from roads. During the 1920s, there were attempts to ban children from riding bicycles in the United Kingdom. A 1929 report from the CTC Gazette of the Cyclists' Touring Club characterized the attempt to ban children from riding bicycles as the latest anti-cycling scare promoted by the British national press.

In 1819, New York City effectively banned velocipedes and dandy horses.

In 1879, New York City banned bicycles from Central Park, restricting the park to horses and carriages only. In 1880, three cyclists were arrested in Central Park for ignoring the ban.

=== Opposition to women cycling ===
In the 1800s and early 1900s, women cyclists were sometimes considered immodest or unfeminine. The Women's Rescue League in Boston opposed women on bicycles, due to the perception that female cycling was "unwomanly and immodest" and "prevent[ed] motherhood among married women".

=== Opposition to cycling infrastructure ===
Proposals to install bike lanes are often followed by vocal opposition by local groups. In some locations, opponents of bike lanes have succeeded in having bike lanes removed. In the United States, the Trump administration has expressed opposition to bike lanes and has attempted to remove the bike lanes on 15th Street in Washington, D.C. Some New York City residents have fought against the installation of bike lanes, including residents of the Upper West Side.

=== Violence against cyclists ===
Women cyclists have reported violence and sexual harassment from male car drivers. Some women are reluctant to use bicycles due to safety concerns, including verbal harassment and sexual harassment.

== Design ==
=== Geographical context ===
A cycle route system that is safe an effecting in one city may not necessarily work elsewhere. It is important to consider factors like different urban designs, such as sprawling suburbs.

=== Cycling speed ===
It is important to consider different cycling cultures, including where riders may ride bicycles with a wider range of gears and like to travel more quickly, such as those who cycle regularly for sport or to incorporate aerobic exercise into their day. Sidepath systems may work for slower cyclists, but faster bicycle types may not be able to travel on them safely at higher speeds.

The Danish Roads Directorate state that the cycle track system "functions best when cyclists travel at relatively low speeds" but what is meant by 'relatively low speeds' is not made clear.

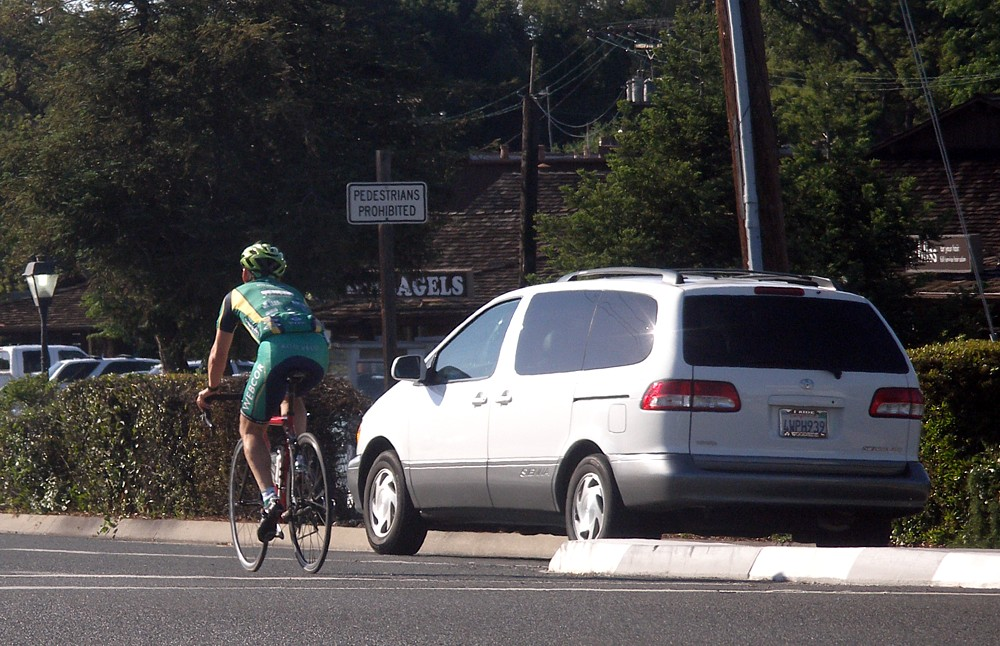
A minivan merging into cycling traffic on Foothill Expressway in Los Altos, California.

Cycling activists in favour of vehicular cycling have opposed cycle tracks and paths on the principle that they might not be created with the "fast cyclist type" in mind.

The UK's Sustrans guidelines for the National Cycle Network are based on recreational use with a design user who is an unaccompanied twelve-year-old. The Dublin Transportation Office has advertised their cycle facilities as being based on an unaccompanied ten-year-old design user. This raises the issue of what happens if different cyclist types find themselves forced onto such devices either by legal coercion or as a result of motorist aggression. This issue is captured in a 1996 review of the Sustrans approach from the Proceedings of the Institution of Civil Engineers.

The fast cycle commuter must not be driven off the highway onto a route that is designed for a 12-year-old or a novice on a leisure trip, because if that happens, the whole attempt to enlarge the use of the bicycle will have failed

However, this is contradicted by members of the Royal Dutch Cycling Union, who state that Dutch competitive cyclists have no problems with training in the Netherlands. There are instances where cycle tracks / sidepaths can accommodate fast cycling as evidenced in this video of a velomobile on a Dutch cycle track.

=== Safety ===
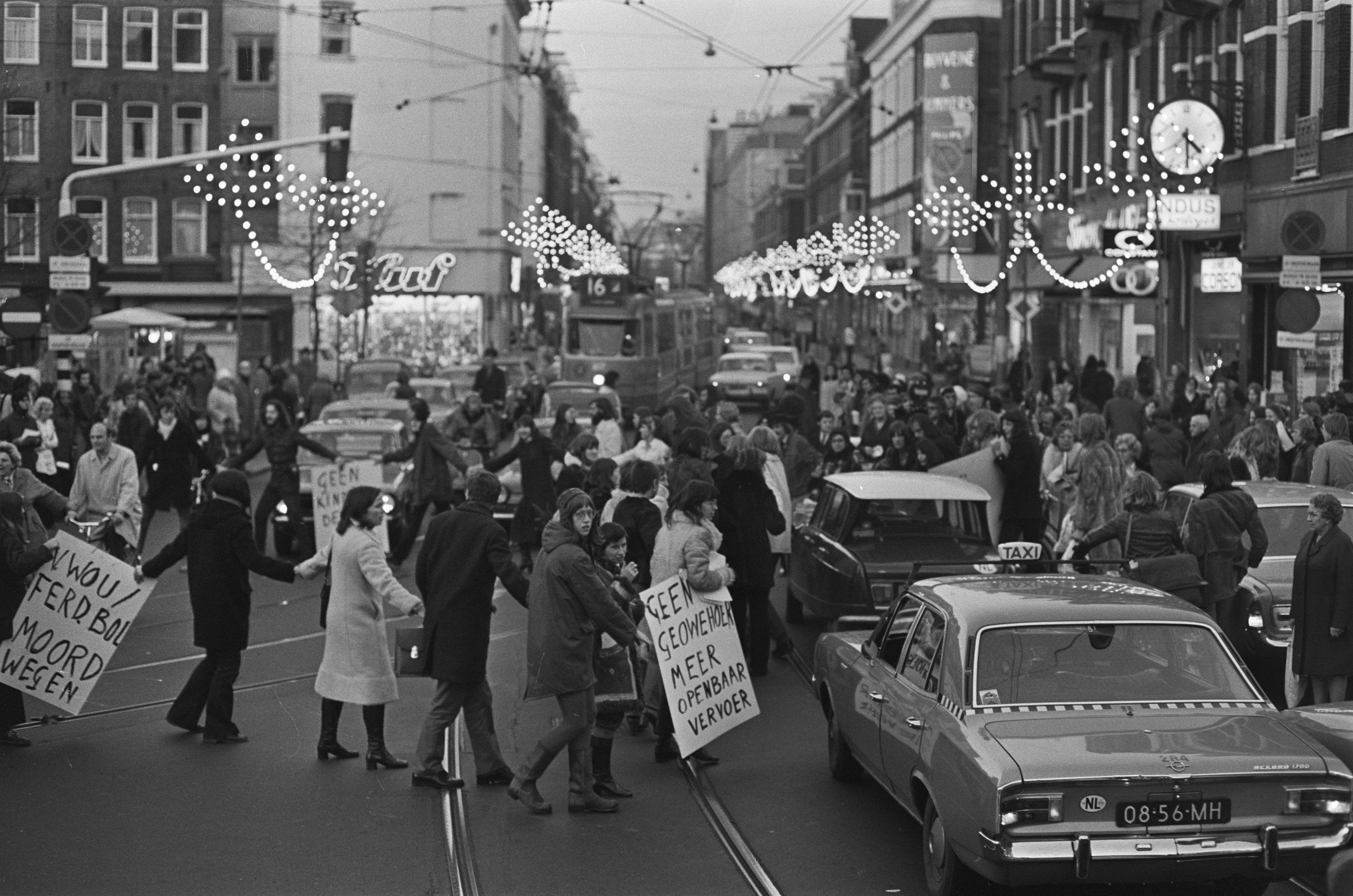
Protest Stop kindermoord Amsterdam, 1972

Some critics of bikeways argue that the focus should instead be placed on educating cyclists in road safety, and others that safety is better served by using the road space for parking.

== Road use by bicycles and cars ==
=== Segregated lanes ===
In 1996 the UK Cyclists' Touring Club (now known as Cycling UK) and the Institute of Highways and Transportation jointly produced a set of Cycle-Friendly Infrastructure guidelines that placed segregated cycling facilities at the bottom of the hierarchy of measures designed to promote cycling. However, since 1996, Cycling UK has changed this position and now fully supports physical separation from motor traffic and pedestrians (i.e. protected cycle lanes and cycle tracks) as effective measures for providing cycle-friendly infrastructure. They argue that people 'prefer, value and use off-street bike paths' among other measures which reduce interaction with motor traffic. More recent guidance from Cycling UK states that cycle tracks should be provided along dual carriageways and inter-urban roads. In the Space for Cycling document, Cycling UK says that cycle lanes 'are usually not good enough to make cycling safe and normal for everyone'.

Planners at the Directorate Infrastructure Traffic and Transport in Amsterdam place cyclists and motorists together on roads with speed limits at or below 30 km/h (19 mph), and segregate them through bicycle lanes at higher limits. This is in a context where most of the measures prioritised by Cycle-Friendly Infrastructure (HGV restrictions, area-wide traffic calming, speed limit enforcement etc.) are already in place – see Utility cycling for more detail.

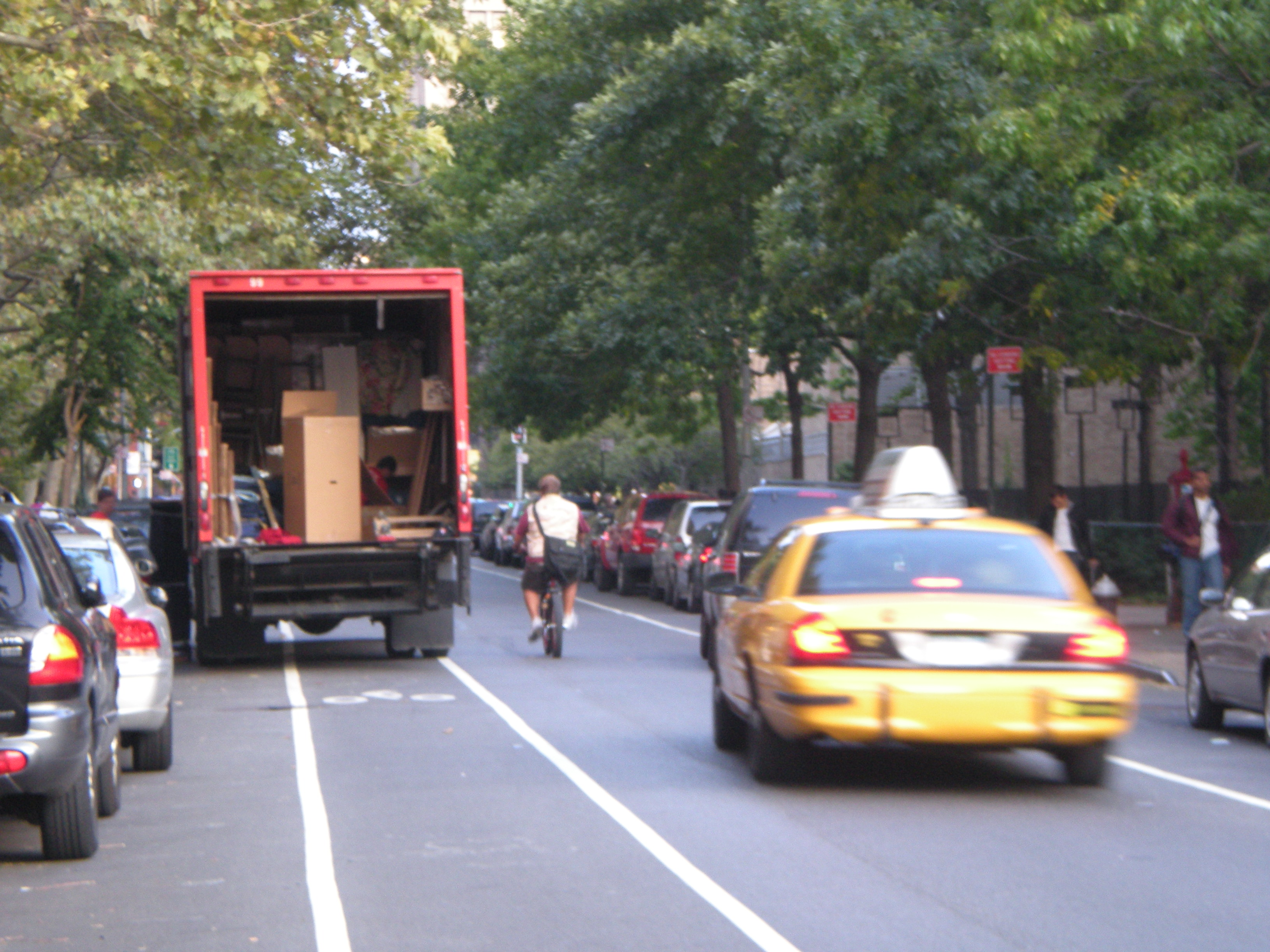
An obstructed cycle lane in New York City.

Bicycle lane sign in New York City.

Share the road sign, New York City.

United States bicycle lane sign with diamond (lozenge) symbol.

Bike Allowed Use of Full Lane CVC 21202, San Francisco.

Bicycles only sign in Ukraine.

=== Restricting road access for cyclists ===
From the advent of the mass-motoring until today, many cycle tracks have been constructed with the intent of prohibiting bicycles from the main roadway, as cyclists have been seen as an obstruction to the free flow of motor traffic.

=== "War on Cars" ===
Some opponents of cycle infrastructure or cycling in general argue that someone - such as a local government or national government - is fighting a "war on cars" (car-free movement) within their area. A commentator in Portland, Oregon argues that the city is fighting a "war on cars" the "experiment has failed" due to falling cycling numbers. The libertarian e-magazine Spiked argues that there is a "war on cars" active in the UK and that this is a 'war on ordinary people'. They argue that environmentalists 'would like to ban cars altogether' and that 'in the age of Net Zero the car is public enemy No.1'. They argue that the Greens 'seem blissfully unaware' of the necessity of cars. They argue that people 'just like [cars]'. This is not a new phenomenon and not restricted to online commentators. For example, in 2010, after winning election, Toronto Mayor Rob Ford, called ending the "war on cars" a top priority. In 2014, the magazine Toronto Life argued that Ford was waging a "war on all forms of transportation except cars". In November 2024, Rob Ford’s brother and Premier of Ontario, Doug, introduced the Reducing Gridlock, Saving You Time Act, amending the Highway Traffic Act to add sections on an approval process for the installation of new bike lanes that would require municipalities to receive approval from the province before installing new bicycle lanes that would result in the removal of lanes for traffic.

Some proponents of alternative transport to the car argue that there is no "war on cars". This framing 'implies motorists are victims of violent assaults' and the 'complaints are unfounded'.

== Maintenance ==
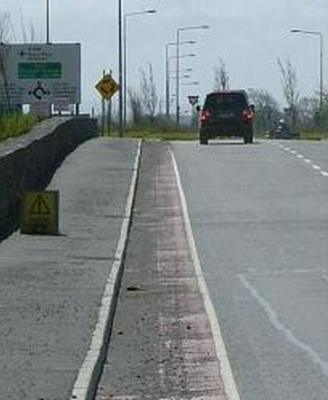
Debris in a cycle lane

Facilities must be made wide enough for the street sweepers and snow plows typically used in a locale, or the locale will need to ensure that they are regularly swept or plowed by machines that will fit.

Some locales have issues with road debris in the cycle paths, such as Milton Keynes, UK, finding that cycle path users are seven times more likely to get punctures than are road cyclists. In Ireland some cyclists have demanded simultaneous commitment to maintenance and sweeping as cycle paths are built.

In areas subject to high leaf-fall in autumn, or high snowfall in winter, any cycle facilities must be subject to regular clearing if they are to remain usable. Danish guidance specifies three different categories of cycle track. Category "A" tracks must be kept clear of snow 24 hours a day, category "B" tracks are swept or cleared daily, and category "C" receive less regular winter maintenance. In 2007 the city of Copenhagen spent DKK 9.9 million (US$1.72 million, €1.33 million) annually on maintaining its cycle track network. German federal law requires local authorities to declassify cycle tracks that do not conform to strict design and maintenance criteria. In the UK, facilities for non-motorized traffic are not normally salted or gritted in icy conditions, potentially making them dangerous or unrideable.

Cycle lanes sometimes avoid this problem, as they are part of the road and can be easily accessed by maintenance vehicles operating on that road, incurring no extra cost. They only become filled with debris if the road is not maintained or the lane is purposely avoided.

Tracks used at night can be illuminated by conventional means, or by paving with glowing material.

== Effectiveness in encouraging cycling ==
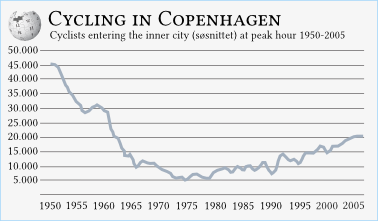
Copenhagen inner city cycle traffic peak hour

There are many factors, such as cycle tracks and other cycling infrastructure, which contribute to cycling levels. A number of cities have demonstrated that particular cycle tracks will increase bike traffic on those routes.

Bike usage increased by 40% in areas of Montreal where the city invested in bike paths and lanes. In Copenhagen bike traffic increased by about 20% because of the construction of cycle tracks. The construction of separated bike lanes on Dunsmuir Street and Viaduct in Vancouver, Canada, saw bike traffic volumes on the street more than double from before the construction. NYC likewise saw cycling rates nearly triple on weekdays and doubled on weekends when the bike path was installed alongside Prospect Park West.

Seville, Spain, is an example of what is possible on a city scale when a large investment is made in cycling infrastructure over a short period of time. In 2006 there were around 6000 bike trips made daily in the city of around 700,000. By 2009 there were about 50,000 daily bike trips. During those three years 8 urban bike paths totaling 70 km were built; the city centre was closed to motorised traffic; school projects were funded to create safe school paths; traffic calming measures were provided in school districts and the bicycle sharing system 'Sevici' was launched. The combination of all these factors helped to create a dramatic change in cycling rates.

As more cycle tracks are built in North American cities, more research is being conducted on the uptake and safety of cycle tracks. North American cities that have recently installed cycle tracks have seen significant growth in cyclists using these roads.

After a certain trip modal share it may take more than just installing cycle tracks to create large increases in cycle rates. Cycling rates in the Netherlands peaked in the 1960s and dropped dramatically until the mid-1970s. The decline in bicycle use was "not only caused by mass motorization but also by the related, fairly uncoordinated process of urbanization and by scores of social, spatial and economic developments", such as a decrease in population density and increased travel distances. The bicycle was almost completely left out of the national government's vision. Certain cities, however, such as Amsterdam and Eindhoven, were slowly implementing more bicycle-positive policies: for example, bike-only streets and allowing cyclists to ignore one way streets. Throughout the 70s cycling rates increased, but the investments in bike paths made in the subsequent period had less effect. Between the late 1980s and early 1990s the Netherlands spent 1.5 billion guilders (US$945 million) on cycling infrastructure, yet cycling levels stayed practically the same.

When the flagship Delft Bicycle Route project was evaluated, the Institute for Road Safety Research claimed that the results were "not very positive: bicycle use had not increased, neither had the road safety. A route network of bicycle facilities has, apparently, no added value for bicycle use or road safety". The study by Louisse, C.J. et al. however, did find that "[a]lthough the total number of victims among cyclists did not decline, the percentage of fatalities and severely injured did drop dramatically." A more comprehensive policy change in addition to bicycle routes, on the other hand, helped to raise the cycling rates in Groningen where 75% of all traffic is by bike or foot. Groningen focused on land use policy, city planning and economic policy changes to achieve very high cycling rates.

In the UK, a ten-year study of the effect of cycle facilities in eight towns and cities found no evidence that they had resulted in any diversion from other transport modes. The construction of 320 kilometres (200 mi) of "Strategic cycle network" in Dublin has been accompanied by a 15% fall in commuter cycling and 40% falls in cycling by second and third-level students.

In some locales bike traffic increases first and bike paths and lanes are installed in order to catch up to the demand. For instance, bike planning in Davis, California was driven by the prior existence of a "dramatic volume" of cyclists in the 1960s. Research on the German bicycle boom of the 1980s paints a picture of German local authorities struggling to keep up with the growth of cycling rather than this growth being driven by their interventions. In relation to the UK, it has been argued that locally high levels of cycling are more likely to result from factors other than cycle facilities. These include an existing cycling culture and historically high levels of cycle use, compact urban forms, lack of hills and lack of barriers such as high speed intersections.

However, Pucher and Buehler, U.S.-based researchers, have stated that "the provision of separate cycling facilities" appears to be one of the keys to the achieving of high levels of cycling in the Netherlands, Denmark and Germany. Furthermore, urban planners in some cities in the U.S. have started to use predictive analytics to estimate the extent to which usage of proposed bicycle paths will improve health outcomes in specific neighborhoods.

== Cost ==
A common myth in the UK is the motor tax fallacy. Some opponents of safe cycling infrastructure argue that cyclists do not pay a road tax and money used to fund the roads should not be directed to improving the safety of cyclists. However, all roads in the UK are funded from general taxation and road tax has not existed in the UK since 1936. Vehicle excise and fuel duty go directly into the consolidated fund - which funds all government activities and public services in the UK.

However, bikeways do have cost. Cities that add bikeways can expect millions in cost depending on the existing infrastructure. In places like the United States, funding of roads comes largely from imposts, or taxes and fees on motor vehicles like gasoline taxes, and registration fees.

== See also ==
- Bikeway safety
- Bicycle transportation planning and engineering
- Car culture
- Car dependency
- Cyclability
- Cycling infrastructure
- Motonormativity
- Road rage
