= Pedaling Revolution =

2009 non-fiction book by Jeff Mapes

Pedaling Revolution: How Cyclists Are Changing American Cities
- Author: Jeff Mapes
- Subject: Cycling advocacy
- Publisher: Oregon State University Press
- Publication date: 2009
- Pages: 288
- ISBN: 978-0-87071-419-1

Pedaling Revolution: How Cyclists Are Changing American Cities is a non-fiction book written by Jeff Mapes, a political reporter for The Oregonian. The book gives a brief history of the bicycle from its start in the early 1800s, when it could only be afforded by the wealthy, through to the present. He talks of the 1890s when bicycles were inexpensive enough for commoners to afford, yet automobiles had yet to be mass produced, and city streets were filled with bikes leading the League of American Wheelmen to lobby for paved roads. The end of World War II saw a decline in the bicycle as automobiles became more a way of life. The 1970s saw a boom in the American bicycle market, to again decline in the 1980s. Most recently, Mapes looked at several then-current politicians who were outspoken about bicycle advocacy such as then-chairman Jim Oberstar (D-MN) of the United States House Committee on Transportation and Infrastructure who Mapes calls the highest regarded cycling supporter in Congress. Later chapters look at cycling in cities such as Amsterdam, Davis, California, Portland, Oregon, and New York City. The final chapters detail some of the risks and rewards of bicycling.

The trade journal Library Journal highly recommends this book for all libraries. Cycling advocate John Allen argues that the book is most valuable for the attention to detail, saying "the book will be a valuable resource... for historians some twenty or fifty years in the future".

== Reviews ==
Former Talking Heads member and current New York Times contributor David Byrne writes that the book contains more than facts and figures. Mapes inserts anecdotes about his own life and bicycling. He recalls when he switched jobs and was forced from commuting by bike to car. He found he gradually got depressed from the lack of exercise. Mapes argues that promoting cycling will raise the fitness level of the general population. One review says that the book is written from a journalistic approach to cycling advocacy, and does not represent advocacy itself.

Brett Campbell summarizes Mapes' chapters on individual cities by saying that even in cities that are now considered bike-friendly such as Portland, Oregon, biking wasn't always so easy. Mapes said he purposefully left out references to bike-friendly Eugene, Oregon because he didn't want to make the book too specific to Oregon. Campbell further notes that progress towards more livable cities in American has slowed compared to European counterparts like Copenhagen and Amsterdam. Ann Robinson writing in The Oregonian says that "Pedaling Revolution is easily the best book-length examination of cycling culture and its connection to big-picture issues." The target audience of Pedaling Revolution is middle-class Americans urbanites who don't know that they can use a bicycle for commuting or utility purposes such as grocery shopping. Further praise from Megan Hill writing for the Matador Network, saying the book "proves that the movement towards bicycle-friendly streets goes beyond just cycling; it fits into the larger solution for smarter urban planning and more liveable cities." Kelly Nelson, writing on the Carbusters.org site, says that she would "be more convinced, however, that a pedaling revolution is truly underway if he had detailed thriving bike cultures in Atlanta, Dallas and Las Vegas."

== Themes ==
In the book, Mapes makes an argument that making more room for the bicycle on American roads is something that we need. Mapes' book was published one year after J. Harry Wray's book Pedal Power that explored how the bicycle rose as a cultural and political force in America. Jonathan Maus at BikePortland.org was impressed with the scope of the book. Most of the research for the book took place during a six months sabbatical from work. Maus thinks that Mapes drew too fine a line between vehicular cyclists like John Forester and more mainstream cycling advocates, saying "I think some readers might get the sense that the battle for ideas between VC advocates and more mainstream advocates... is greater than it actually is."

Stacey Moses, comments that every cycling advocate will be attracted to one or two major issues in the book from participation in Critical Mass, playing cycle polo in the street, or securing funding for Safe Routes to School. Pedaling Revolution shows that these inseparably issues are linked, and that creating and fostering a bicycle culture with youth is needed to fully understand alternative transportation issues.

A recurring theme in the book is safety, with the main thesis that cycling safety is related to the number of cyclists. The more cyclists there are, the safer the streets are for bikes and pedestrians. This is reflected in the chapter on Davis, California, which Mapes describes as "ten square miles surrounded by reality", where bicycles have reached a critical mass where drivers are now more cognizant of them. Mapes spends quite a lot of the book talking about the differences between men and women cycling in urban cities. He concludes that women are more reluctant to bike than men over safety concerns, and that the best indicator of a cities bike safety is the ratio of men to women cyclists. For cycling to attain a significant share of the transportation market, it will need to appear safer to attract the risk-averse. Amsterdam has nearly fifty percent of its population on a bike everyday, without bike helmets, because cycling is seen as a safe activity. In a 2009 interview, Mapes concedes that he would be surprised to see bicycling see a 30 percent mode share, and that doing so would require a national commitment. But he did think that portions of cities, such as Portland's east side, may achieve such levels. A review of the reviews on TreeHugger points out that even the best bicycling city in the United States only has about 30% of bicycle users being women.

Other readers have focused on the safety issue from a traffic justice movement standpoint. This view holds that improving safety should focus on the most vulnerable users. Efforts would include more aggressive traffic laws enforcement and holding drivers responsible in collisions with pedestrians or cyclists.
