= Bicycles May Use Full Lane =

Traffic sign used in the United States

Bicycles May Use Full Lane (R4-11)

The Bicycles May Use Full Lane sign, also referred to as BMUFL or R4-11, is a traffic sign used in the United States to:

- designate roads with lanes that are too narrow to be safely shared side-by-side by a bicycle and another vehicle to indicate that bicyclists may occupy the full lane to discourage unsafe within-lane passing
- encourage bicyclists to use the full lane to discourage unsafe within-lane passing
- encourage motorists to change lanes to pass bicyclists
- warn motorists that bicyclists may be using the full lane

The sign consists of a graphic image of a bicycle, followed by the words, "May Use Full Lane".

Bicycles Allowed Use Of Full Lane (R9-20)

BMUFL was first specified in Chapter 9B of the 2009 Manual on Uniform Traffic Control Devices, and was replaced with the Bicycles Allowed Use of Full Lane sign (R9-20) in the 11th Edition in 2023.

== Sign effectiveness ==
A study conducted by the City of Austin in 2010 showed that placement of BMUFL signs influenced cyclists to generally ride farther from the curb (an average of 0.31 ft [94 mm]), and drivers moved further left as they passed bikes after the signs were installed, such that the percentage of motorists who passed within 3 feet (0.91 m) of the bicyclist dropped from 44% to 0%.

== Guidance for placement ==
The 2012 edition of the California Manual on Uniform Traffic Control Devices indicates that the Bicycles May Use Full Lane Sign be used "where travel lanes are too narrow for bicyclists and motor vehicles to operate side by side" to "inform users that bicyclists might occupy the travel lane":

Section 9B.06 Bicycles May Use Full Lane Sign (R4-11)

Option:

01 The Bicycles May Use Full Lane (R4-11) sign may be used on roadways where no bicycle lanes or adjacent shoulders usable by bicyclists are present and where travel lanes are too narrow for bicyclists and motor vehicles to operate side by side.
02 The Bicycles May Use Full Lane sign may be used in locations where it is important to inform road users that bicyclists might occupy the travel lane.
03 Section 9C.07 describes a Shared Lane Marking that may be used in addition to or instead of the Bicycles May Use Full Lane sign to inform road users that bicyclists might occupy the travel lane.

Support:

04 The Uniform Vehicle Code (UVC) (Also refer to CVC 21202(a)(3)) defines a “substandard width lane” as a “lane that is too narrow for a bicycle and a vehicle to travel safely side by side within the same lane.”

"Bicycle May Use Full Lane" signs are not approved for use in Michigan according to the September 2013 Edition of the Michigan Manual on Uniform Traffic Control Devices since they are "not applicable" under state law.

== Early installations ==
=== California ===
In 2012, the City of Encinitas, California installed shared lane markings and Bicycles May Use Full Lane signs along Coast Highway 101 to "alert motorists that cyclists have the legal right to take the lane".

=== Florida ===
The Bicycles May Use Full Lane Sign was adopted for use by the Florida Department of Transportation in January 2011. By March 17, 2012, the signs were installed in at least three locations.

=== Kentucky ===
In July 2012, 31 Bicycles May Use Full Lane signs were installed in Louisville, Kentucky. Dirk Gowin, an engineering project coordinator with the Louisville Metro Department of Public Works & Assets, points out that to accommodate a car and bicycle safely side-by-side within a lane, the lane would have to be "13 or 14 feet wide". The signs were installed on roads like River Road, with lanes from 11 to 12 feet (3.4 to 3.7 m) in width.

=== Maine ===
Bicycles May Use Full Lane signs were installed on William Clarke Drive in Westbrook in 2011, and since then have been used in multiple places in Portland, including sections of Outer Congress Street and St. John Street.

=== Maryland ===
Twenty Bicycles May Use Full Lane signs were installed by the City of Baltimore in 2012.

After 600 cyclists objected to an initial decision to reject the sign, in 2012, the Maryland State Highway Administration posted Bicycles May Use Full Lane signs along Maryland Route 953 in Glenn Dale, and announced plans to post more such signs in Montgomery and Prince George's counties.

=== Minnesota ===
Bicyclists May Use Full Lane signs were first installed in Minnesota in 2011, including on a downhill section of Marshall Avenue in St. Paul "where the travel lane is less than 14′ wide".

=== Missouri ===
Bicycles May Use Full Lane signs were installed on Florissant Rd. in Ferguson, Missouri, in 2012.

=== Vermont ===
Bicycles May Use Full Lane signs were installed in 2012 on multiple streets in Burlington, Vermont, including North Ave., Riverside Ave., Pine St. and Shelburne Rd.
