= Cyclecraft =

1988 book by John Franklin

- First edition
- Author: John Franklin
- Language: English
- Subject: Cycling
- Publisher: Unwin Paperbacks
- Publication date: 1988
- Publication place: United Kingdom
- ISBN: 978-0-11-703740-3
- OCLC: 137217934

Cyclecraft (ISBN 978-0-11-703740-3) is a British cycling skills manual written by John Franklin and now published by The Stationery Office. It is the foundation of Bikeability, the UK's national standard for cycle training. Its author, John Franklin works as a cycle safety consultant and is registered as an expert witness on cycling matters including cycling on roads, design of cycling facilities, cycling accidents and cycle helmets. Franklin prefers a vehicular cycling approach, believing that with appropriate training, cyclists of abilities are able to ride safely on most roads, and he advises readers that segregated cycle tracks may present additional risks, particularly near junctions.

The book was first published by Unwin Books in 1988, the first Stationery Office edition was in 1997 and the latest revision was published in 2014. In this edition the scope of the book was extended from its original remit—skilled cycling techniques for adults—to cover cyclists of all ages.

According to The Independent, it "offers a comprehensive discussion of the techniques of cycling—basic techniques, like how to steer and use your gears properly, along with the more elusive skills of positioning yourself in traffic, and anticipating aggressive or inattentive motorists."

Cyclecraft has traditionally been highly regarded by cycling organisations, though individuals and groups campaigning for segregated cycle tracks tend to be critical of Franklin's views.

== North American edition ==
Franklin has authored a North American edition of Cyclecraft (ISBN 9780117064768), published in June 2009. This edition deals with United States and Canadian laws and cycling on the right side of the road. This edition has been endorsed by the League of American Bicyclists and the Canadian Cycling Association.

== Sources ==
- Cycle Touring & Campaigning (CTC)
- Reviews excerpted
