= Car culture =

Car culture may refer to:

- Societal effects of cars § Cultural changes
- Car dependency
- 1950s American automobile culture
- Category:Car culture

== See also ==
- Bicycle culture
- Walkability
