= Bikeability =

Charity providing vehicular cycling education

- The Bikeability Trust
- Formation: 2007
- Legal status: Registered charity
- Headquarters: Cambridge
- Location: Cambridgeshire, United Kingdom
- Executive Director: Emily Cherry
- Website: bikeability.org.uk

Bikeability is the Department for Transport’s national award provider for cycle training in England. Primarily for children and young people, it is a progressive programme where riders will first master cycle handling skills in motor-traffic-free environments (Level 1), then develop their skills and confidence to cycle on single-lane roads and simple junctions with mostly moderate motor traffic flows (Level 2), before tackling busier/ or faster roads, and complex junctions (Level 3). After completing the training, Bikeability cyclists receive a booklet, a badge and a certificate to recognise training completion. The certificate also identifies areas for further practice as noted by the instructor.

The programme itself is based upon on the National Standard for Cycle Training. This is a UK Government standard created by the Department for Transport and approved by the Cycle Training Standards Board. The national standard for cycle training is there as a statement of competent cycling and cycling instruction. The National Standard sets out the skills and understanding needed to cycle safely and responsibly and to enable others to cycle. The standard provides the basis for Bikeability and a range of adult cycle training schemes.

== Core training programme ==
Bikeability training is organised and delivered locally by registered Bikeability providers, and predominantly takes place at schools (Years 5–7). The core training itself is divided into three levels. Level 1 consists of two modules with four activities delivered over two hours. Level 2 has three modules with eight activities delivered over six hours. Finally, Level 3 has two modules with four activities delivered over two hours. In terms of course ratios, the maximum riders per instructor for Level 1 is twelve, for Level 2 it is six, and for Level 3 it is three.

At Level 1, new riders learn to:

- Prepare themselves for a journey
- Check the cycle is ready for a journey
- Set off, pedal, slow down and stop
- Pedal (including looking behind, cycling one handed, turning and controlling speed)

At Level 2, riders learn to:

- Cycle safely and responsibly
- Identify and respond to hazards
- Start and stop on-road journeys
- Maintain suitable riding positions
- Share the road with others and communicate with other road users
- Comply with signals, signs and road markings
- Manage risk when cycling
- Negotiate junctions (pass side roads, turn at T junctions, and crossroads and roundabouts if present)

At Level 3, riders learn to:

- Plan a journey
- Plan to and ride assertively everywhere cycling is permitted
- Maintain suitable riding positions
- Cooperate with and respect other road users (including avoiding driver blind spots and riding with others)
- Pass queuing traffic and use junctions controlled by traffic lights (if present)
- Use cycle infrastructure and multi lane roads (if present)
- Ride on roads with speeds above 30 mph (if present)

== Bikeability Plus ==
In addition to the three Bikeability Levels, Bikeability Plus is a series of 10, free-standing modules designed to ensure that children and families are given the opportunities, skills, and guidance needed to make cycling a part of their everyday life. They are intended to complement and support Bikeability training (Levels 1, 2 and 3) which is aimed at improving the cycling skills and confidence of trainees who can already ride.

In particular, the modules have been developed to address some of the ‘barriers’ to getting children cycling. For instance, they help to get non-riders riding, parents involved and supportive, those without access to a working bike included, and provide knowledge about local cycling routes/opportunities to enable continued cycling after training.

== Administration and management ==
Bikeability is administered by The Bikeability Trust; a charitable organisation aiming to advance the cycling education of the public (in particular young children). The Trust itself manages, develops and promotes Bikeability, and is responsible for distributing The Bikeability award materials. Bikeability is funded by the Department for Transport and delivered through registered training providers. In order to be able to use the Bikeability name and to be able to award Bikeability badges, a training provider must be registered with the Bikeability Trust. In addition, a Bikeability provider must provide evidence that it has appropriate insurance, child protection policies and risk assessment processes.
