= Bike lane =

Road traffic lane for cyclists

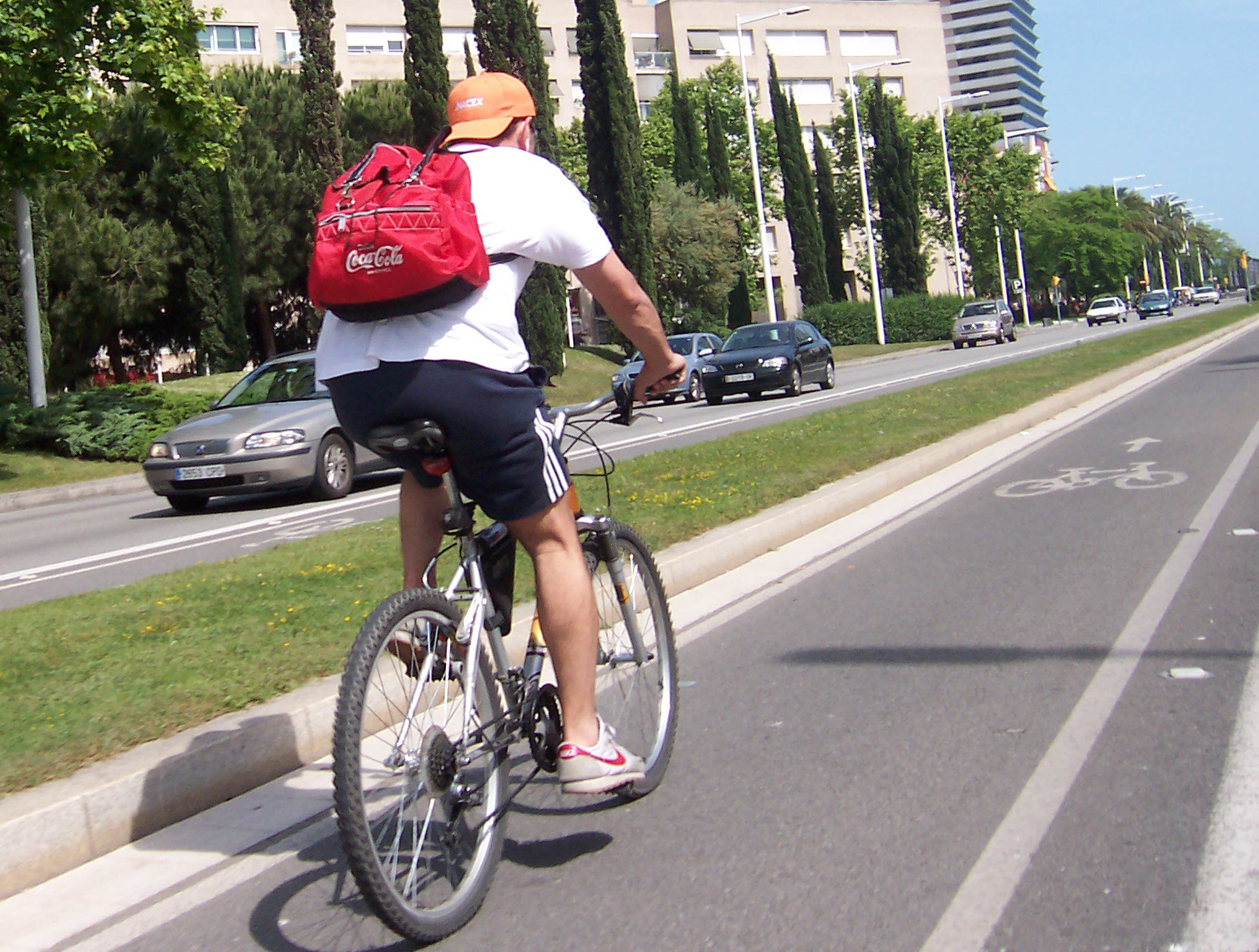
Cycle lane in Barcelona

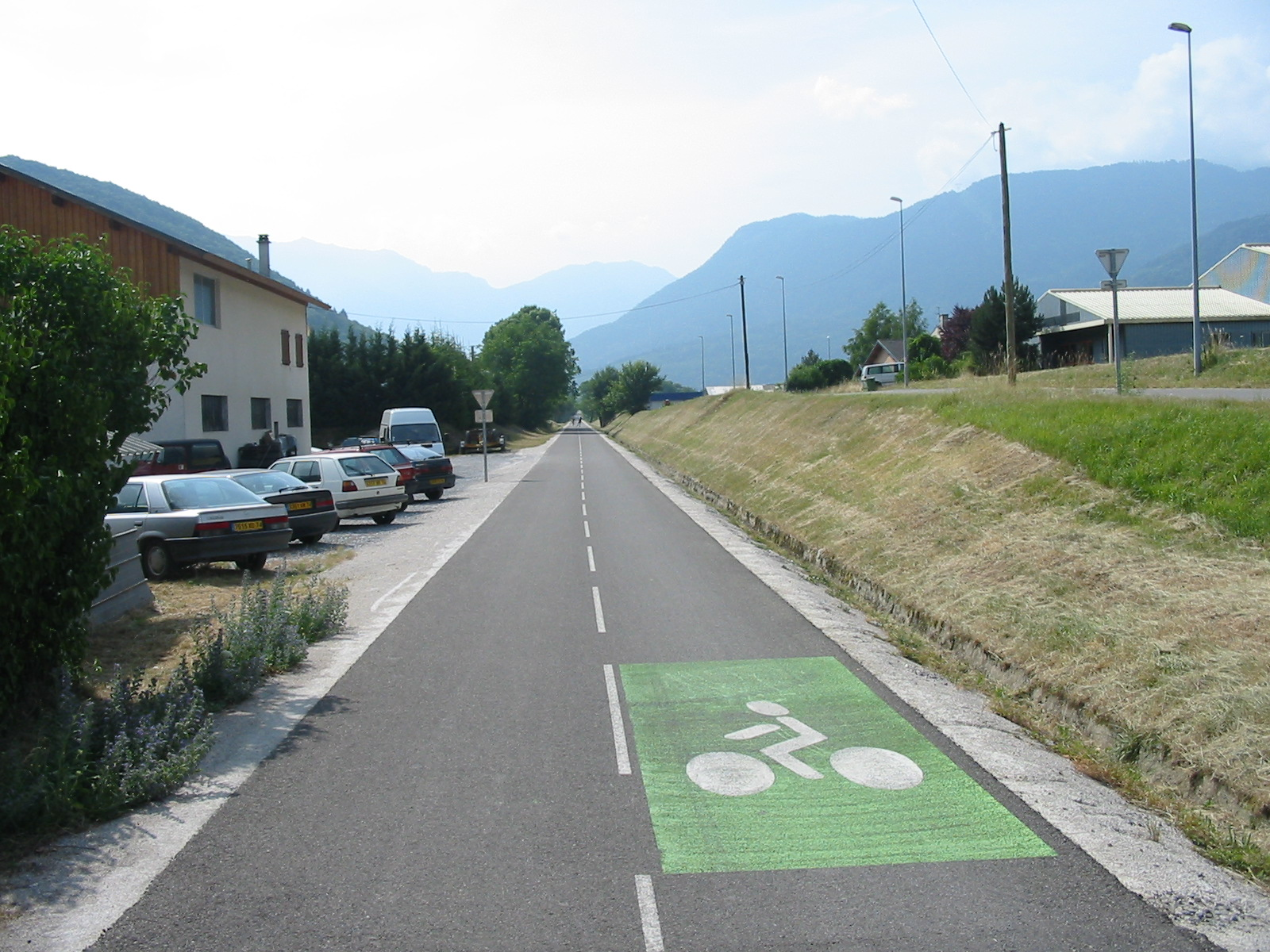
Marked on-road bike lane in rural France

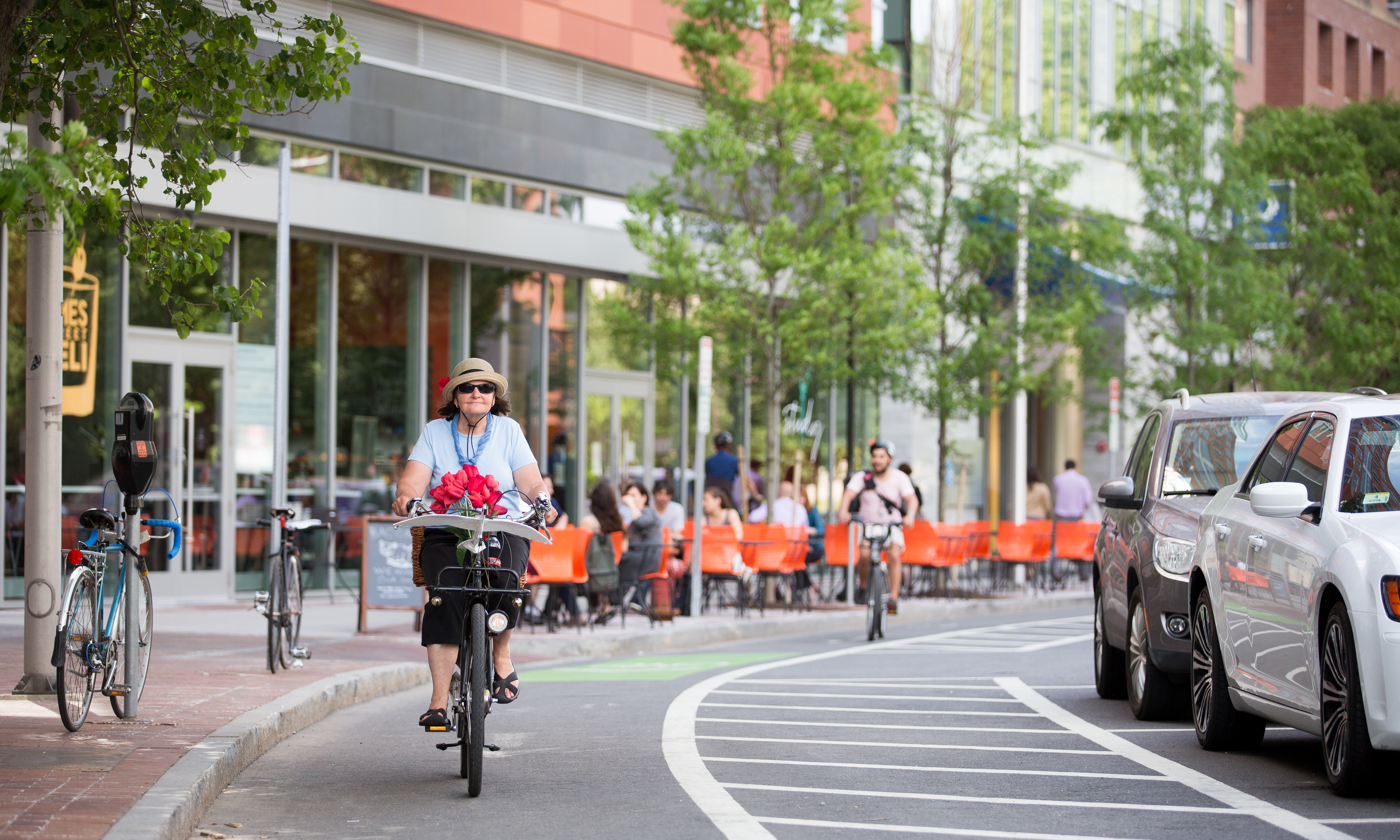
Class IV separated bike way in Cambridge, Massachusetts. The physical division for this particular bike way is the line of parked cars.

Bike lanes (North America) or cycle lanes (UK) are types of bikeways (cycleways) with lanes on the roadway for cyclists only.

Research shows that separated bike lanes improve the safety of bicyclists, and either have positive or non-significant economic effects on nearby businesses.

== History ==
The history of cycling infrastructure starts from shortly after the bike boom of the 1880s when the first short stretches of dedicated bicycle infrastructure were built, through to the rise of the automobile from the mid-20th century onwards and the concomitant decline of cycling as a means of transport, to cycling's comeback from the 1970s onwards.

The United Nations Environment Programme says there ought to be at least ten times more bike lanes by 2030 than there were in 2020.

== Design ==
In the United Kingdom, an on-road cycle-lane can be firmly restricted to cycles (marked with a solid white line, entry by motor vehicles is prohibited) or advisory (marked with a broken white line, entry by motor vehicles is permitted).

== Effects ==
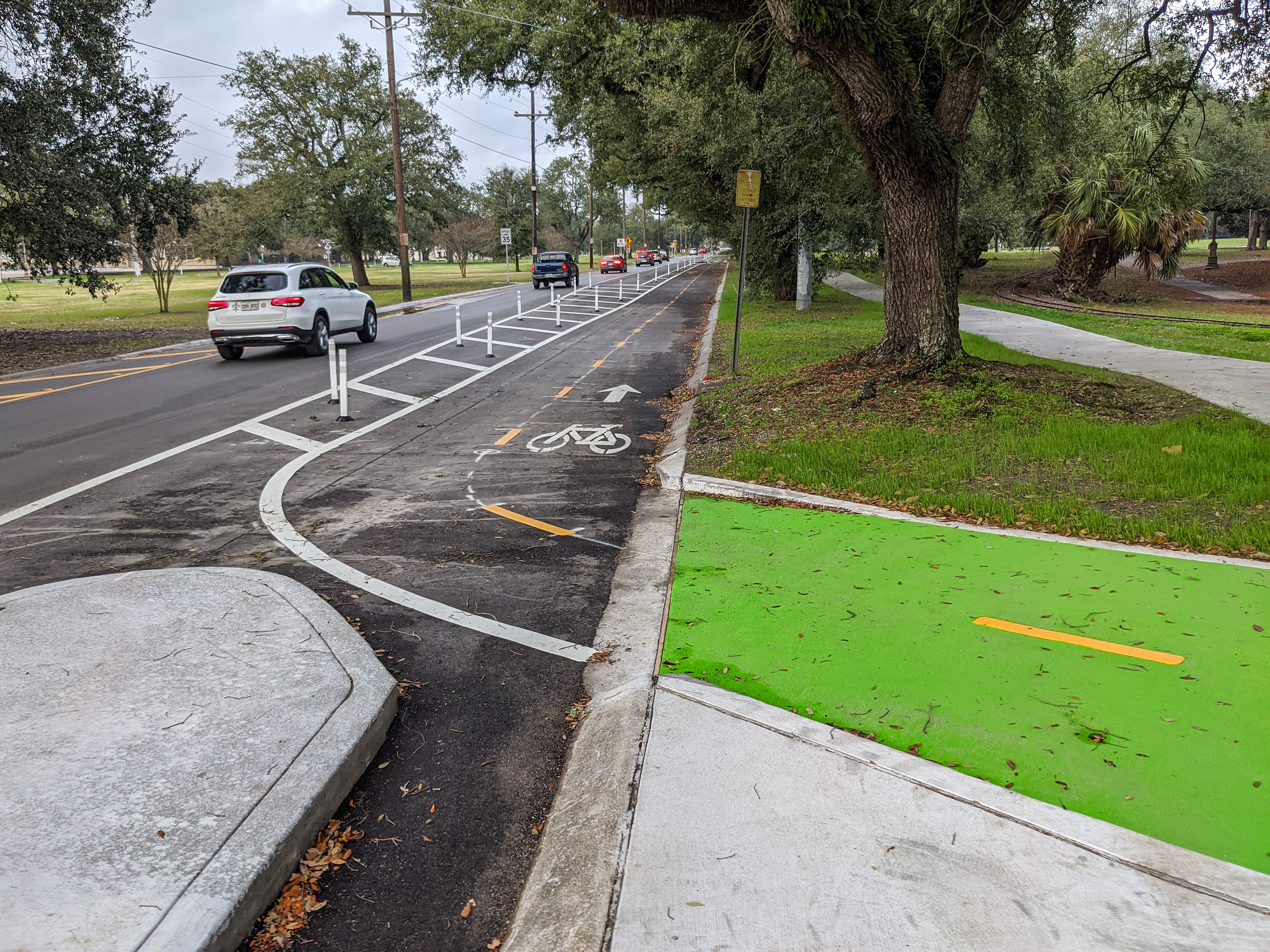
Bike lane separated by plastic delineators, New Orleans

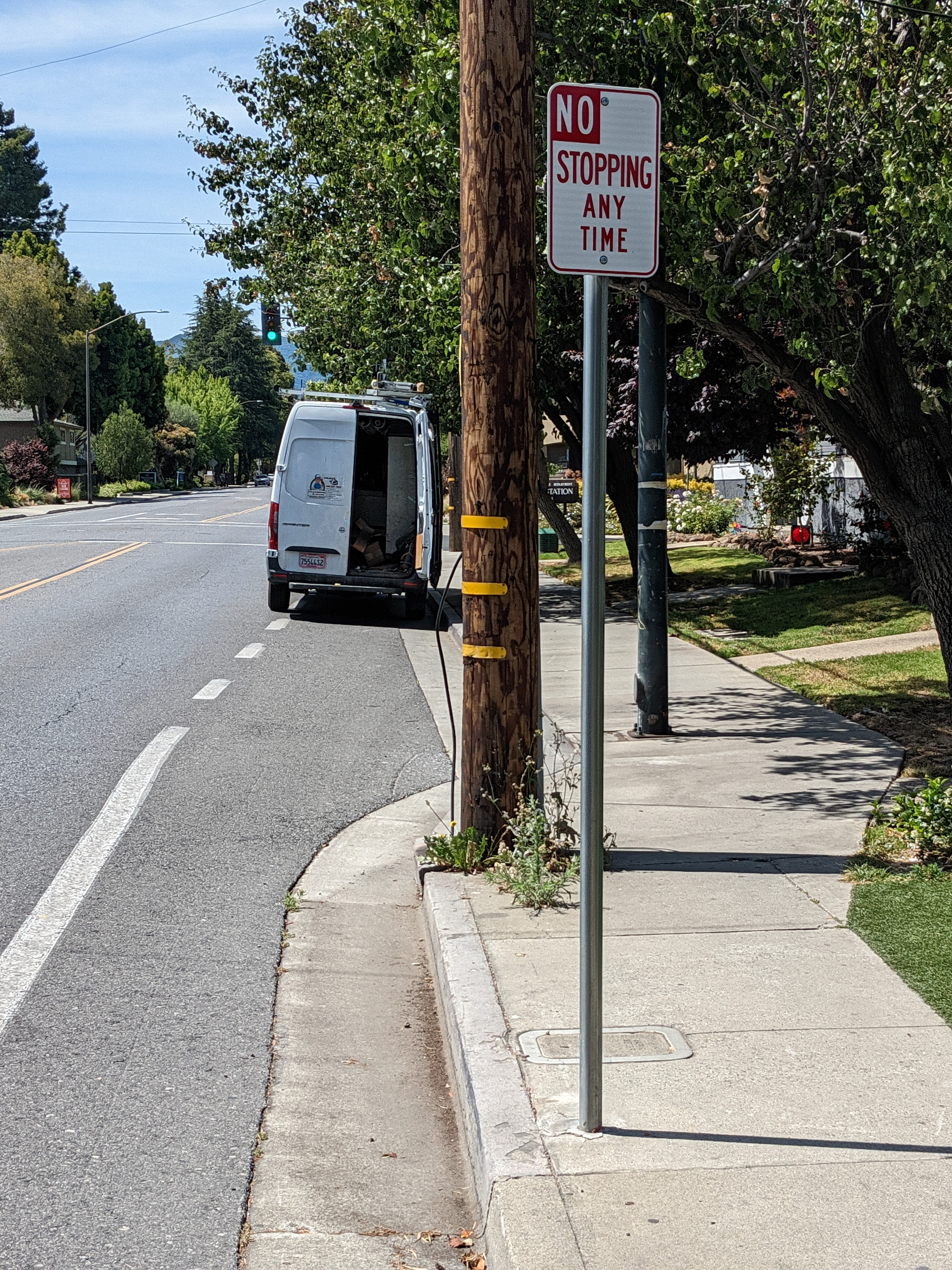
A van parked in an unprotected bike lane

In a 2024 assessment of existing research, the U.S. Department of Transportation concluded that "separated bicycle lanes have an overall improved safety performance."

According to a 2019 study, cities with separated bike lanes had 44% fewer road fatalities and 50% fewer serious injuries from crashes. The relationship was particularly strong in cities where bike lanes were separated from car lanes with physical barriers.

Research published in 2020 showed insights from communities where on-road cycling for transportation is less common, particularly in the Southeast U.S. and reported that potential bikers say separated bike lanes would make them more likely to participate in active transportation. However, scientific research indicates that different groups of cyclists show varying preferences of which aspects of cycling infrastructure are most relevant when choosing a specific cycling route over another; thus, to maximize use, these different groups of cyclists have to be taken into account.

A 2019 study which examined the replacement of 136 on-street parking spots with a bike lane on the Bloor Street retail corridor in Toronto, Canada, found that it increased monthly customer spending and the number of customers on the street. These findings run contrary to a popular sentiment that bike lanes have an adverse effect on local economic activity.

A 2021 review of existing research found that closing car lanes and replacing them with bike lanes or pedestrian lanes had positive or non-significant economic effects on nearby businesses.

== Africa ==
=== South Africa ===
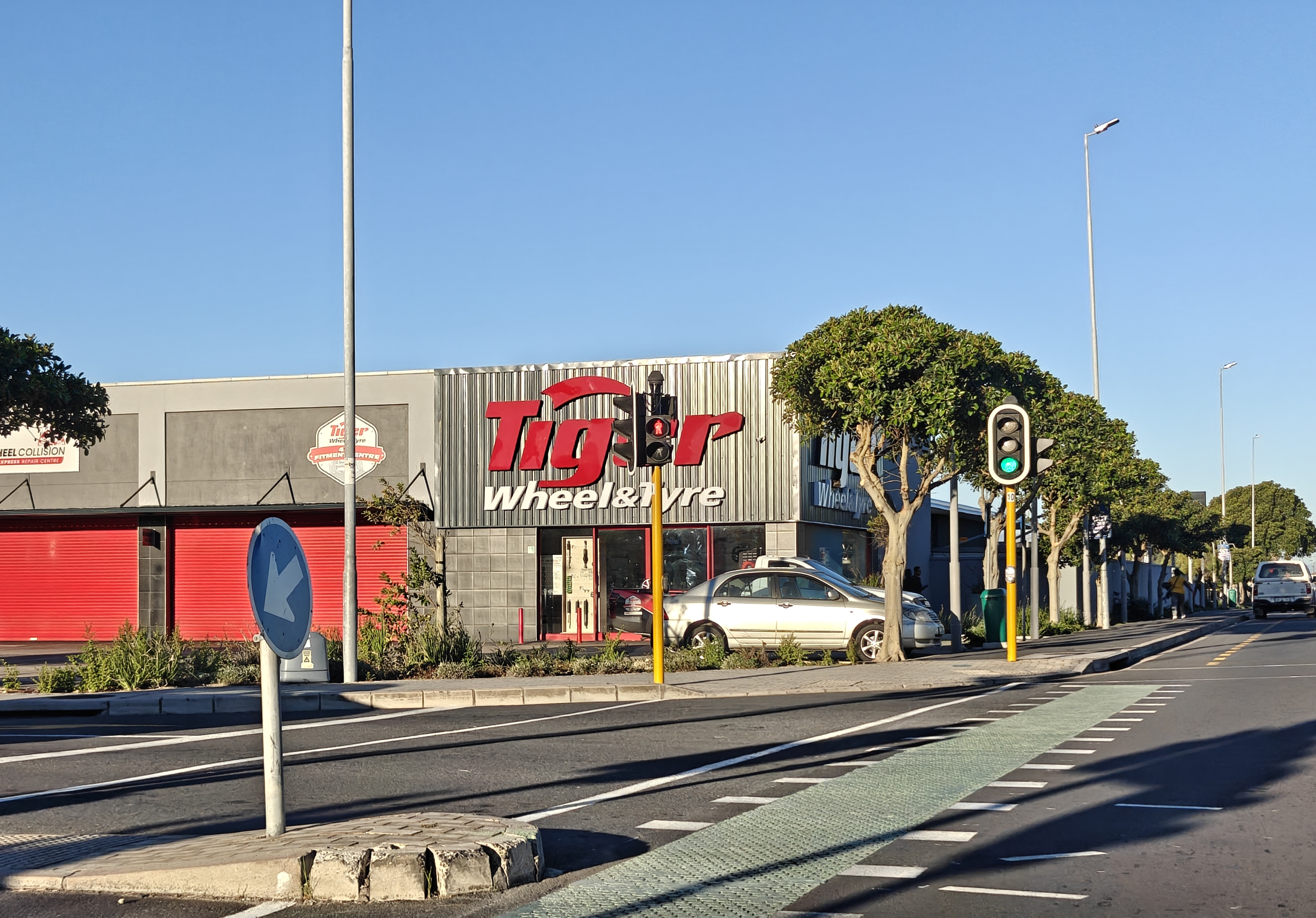
Bike lanes on Tokai Road in Dreyersdal, Cape Town

Cycle lanes are not ubiquitous in South Africa, however the size of dedicated cycle networks varies greatly by city.

For example, Cape Town has an extensive network of dedicated cycle lanes, which are painted green. These lanes can be found in the CBD as well as in suburbs. It is not permissible for cars to drive in cycle lanes, and this is enforced by the City of Cape Town Traffic Service. The bike lanes are part of the City of Cape Town's expanding non-motorized transport (NMT) routes. NMT routes are placed around public transport routes, to allow for easy access and connections to buses and trains.

Cycle routes on roadways are wide and painted green, whereas those along nature trails may be narrower and shared with pedestrians. The City maintains a Non-Motorized Transport Policy and Strategy and a Walking and Cycling Strategy Policy, and aims to maintain a city that is walkable, pedestrian- and cyclist-friendly, and one where cycling is accepted as a norm for transport.

Various associations represent the cycling community in Cape Town, promote the use of bicycles, publish cycling route maps, and facilitate cycling meetups. These include the Pedal Power Association, the Bicycle Empowerment Network, and Cape Town Green Map.

Some cycle lanes in Johannesburg are separated from the road by concrete dividers and sign posts.

The South African National Traffic Act 93 of 1996 states that cyclists are not allowed on freeways. Bicycles are considered vehicles under local traffic law. The South African Department of Transport has actively promoted the use of bicycles as a mode of transport.

== Asia ==
=== China ===
China has a large networks of bike paths and lanes. The city of Nanjing has several types of bike lanes: protected, unprotected, and shared lanes. These lanes are similar to those of other nations, in which the bike lanes are either separated by physical barriers of some form or are entirely separate street paths. Unprotected bike lanes are painted on the street with vehicles but denote their own lane, and shared bike lanes are not denoted but it is implied that bikes will share the whole road with cars on that stretch of land.

Chinese bike usage is relatively high compared to other nations, and as a result, cycling is taken into account when designing road junctions: many junctions include various paths for cyclists, so that they do not have to come into direct contact with motor vehicles. There has been increasing concern over biking accidents in China; a case study in Shanghai found that the most desperate need is to alter unprotected to protected cycle lanes.

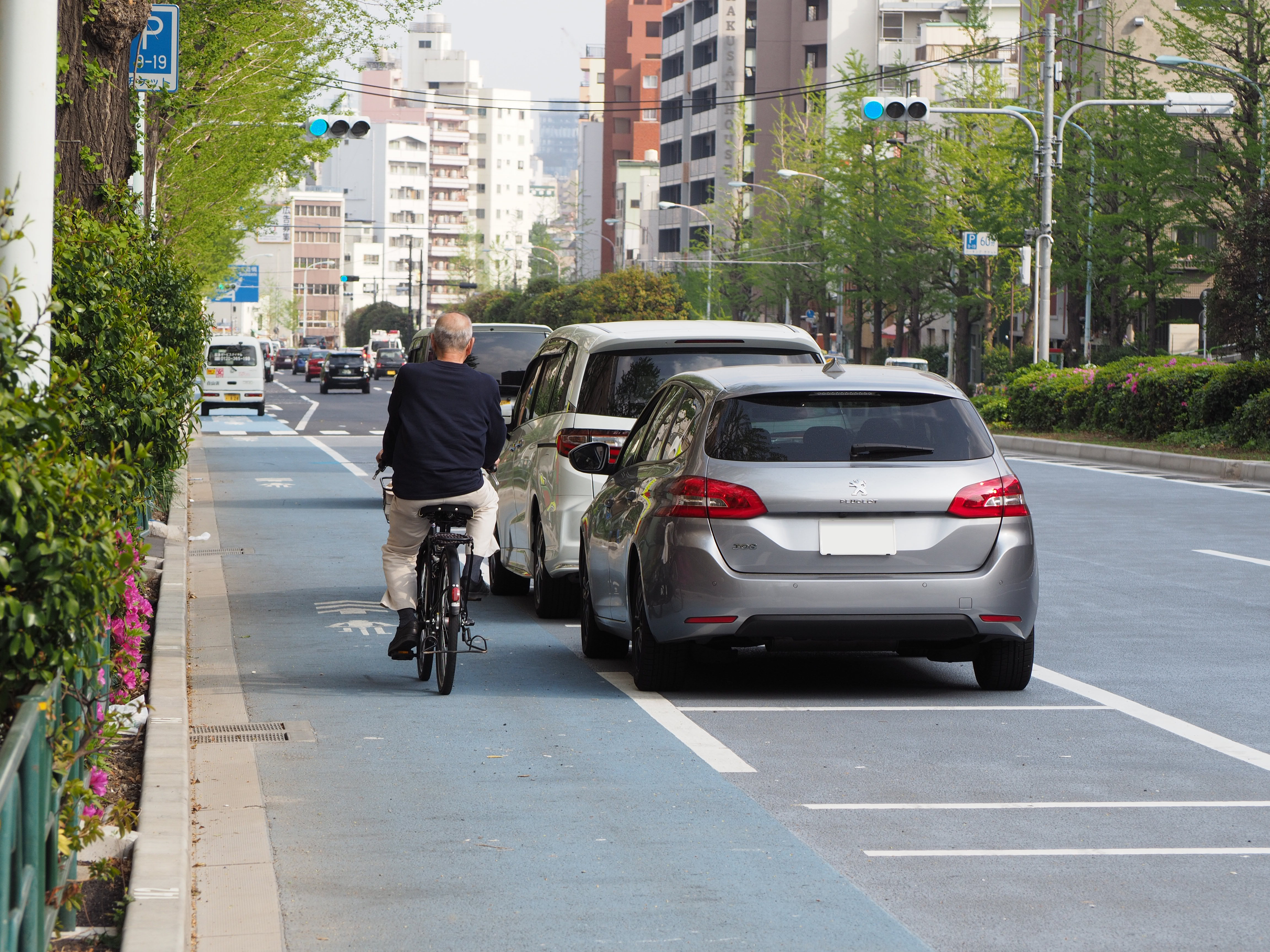
Bike lane separated by parked cars in Hakusan, Japan

=== Japan ===
Commuting by bicycle is quite common in Japan, where bicycle ridership has been increasing dramatically since the 1970s. However, many parts of Japan have been slow to adopt effective and safe means of transport, so in recent times there have been steps taken to promote biking in the nation's largest city, Tokyo. Many bike lanes in Tokyo have been constructed to allow a two-directional flow of traffic in only one lane, but add a physical separation between pedestrians, bike lanes, and the roads.

In addition to these types, there are other forms of bike lanes in various parts of the Tokyo wards that do not separate bicycle users from pedestrians, but do separate them from the road. These lanes are designated typically with signs overhead and some form of painted line to denote a lane for pedestrians and a lane for bikers; however these rules are often not adhered to.

Beyond these forms of bike lanes in Tokyo, there are several other types which mostly consist of some alteration of the aforementioned two, or are simply painted lanes on the side of the road. In other parts of Japan, such as the city of Fukuoka, clear types of bike lanes are being implemented to promote biking in the city: "Bicycle roads, Bicycle lanes, Sidewalks shared between pedestrians and cyclists with markings, and Sidewalks shared with pedestrian with no markings."

== Europe ==
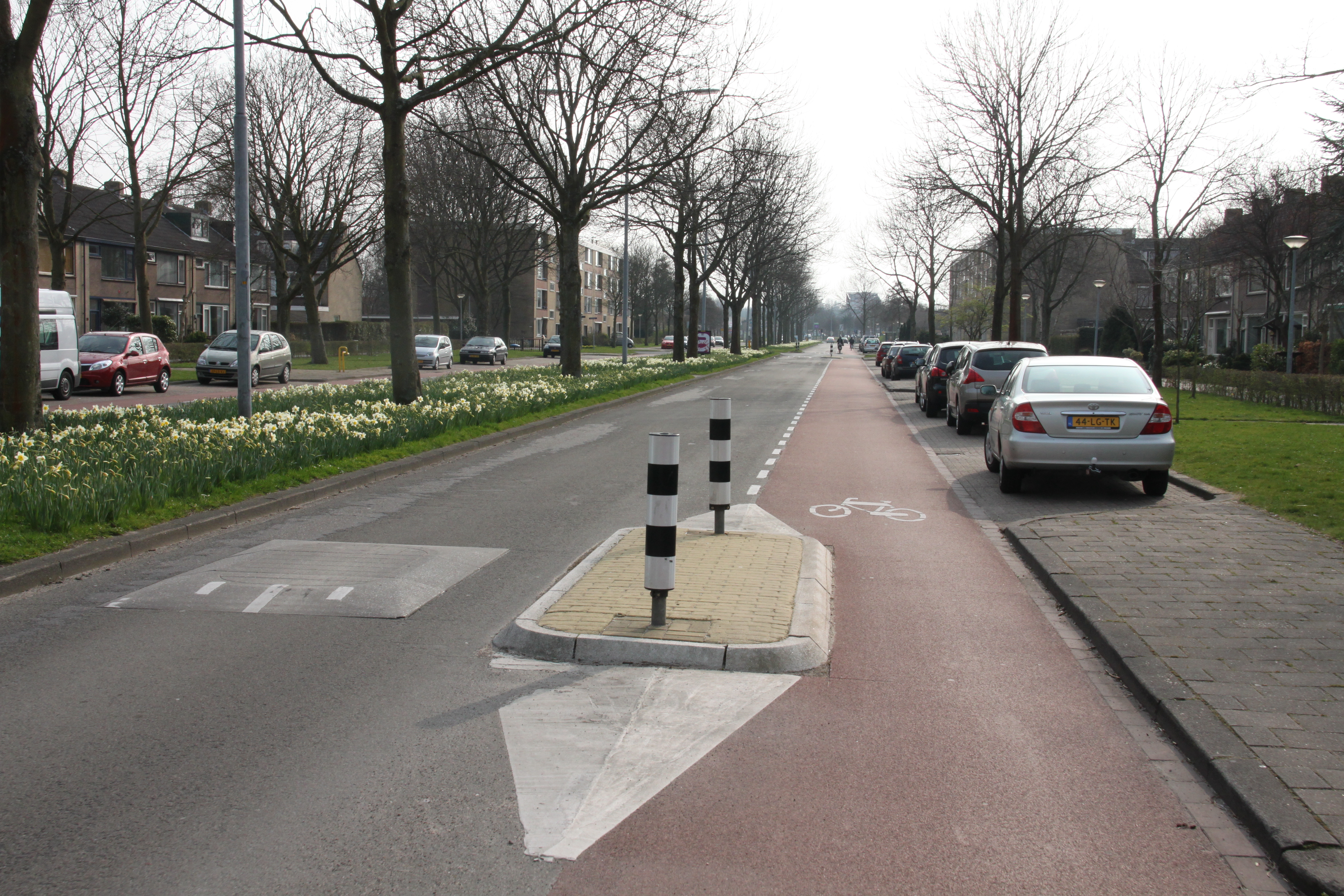
Bike lane in Netherlands

In France, segregated cycling facilities are called bandes cyclables for those beside the carriageway and pistes cyclables for totally independent ones; together they are voies cyclables. In Belgium, traffic laws do not distinguish cycle lanes from cycle paths.Cycle lanes are marked by two parallel broken white lines, and they are defined as being "not wide enough to allow use by motor vehicles".

There is some confusion possible here: both in French (piste cyclable) and in Dutch (fietspad) the term for these lanes can also denote a segregated cycle track, marked by a road sign; the cycle lane is therefore often referred to as a piste cyclable marquée (in French) or a gemarkeerd fietspad (in Dutch), i.e. a cycle lane/track which is "marked" (i.e. identified by road markings) rather than one which is identified by a road sign. In the Netherlands a cycle lane is normally called fietsstrook instead of fietspad.

== North America ==
=== United States ===
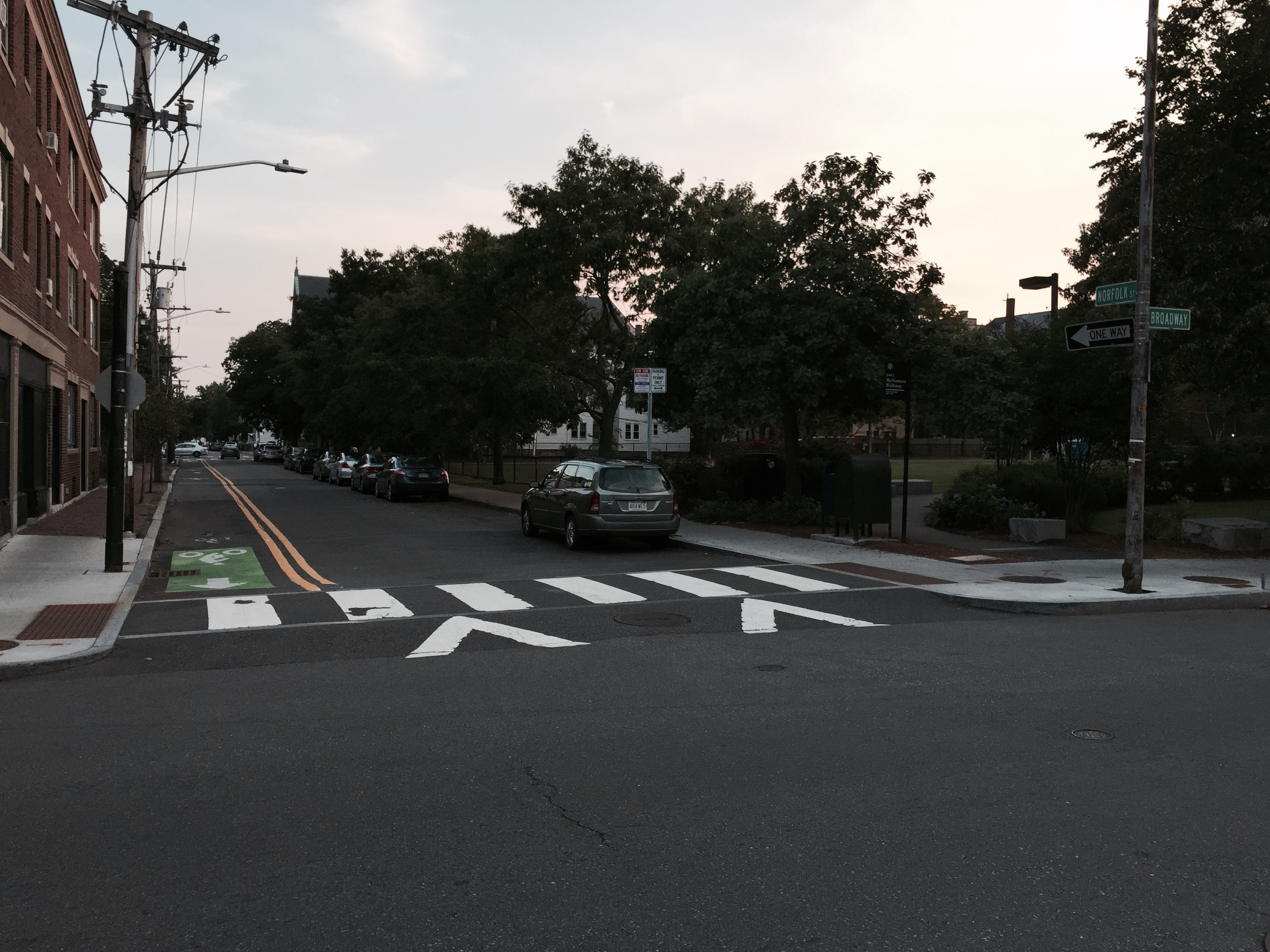
Contra flow bike lane in Cambridge, Massachusetts

In the United States, a designated bicycle lane (1988 MUTCD) or class II bikeway (Caltrans) is always marked by a solid white stripe on the pavement and is for 'preferential use' by bicyclists. There is also a class III bicycle route, which has roadside signs suggesting a route for cyclists, and urging sharing the road. A class IV separated bike way (Caltrans) is a bike lane that is physically separate from motor traffic and restricted to bicyclists only.

According to the National Association of City Transportation Officials (NACTO) bike lanes are an exclusive space for cyclists by using pavement markings and signage. Bike lanes flow in the same direction as motor vehicle traffic and is located adjacent to vehicle movement. Conventional bike lanes provide limited buffer space between vehicles cyclists, as those with protective space are referred to as buffered-bike lanes. Buffered bike lanes are similar to conventional lanes but provide a buffered space between vehicles and cyclists hence the name.

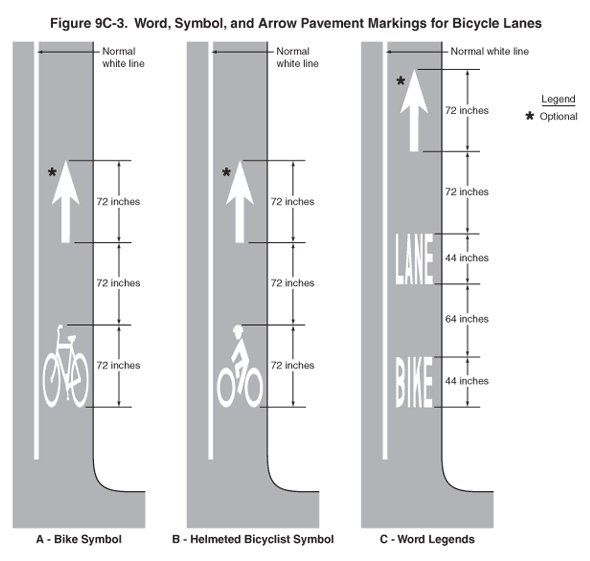
Marking guide for bike lanes

The Manual on Uniform Traffic Control Devices (MUTCD) by the U.S. Department of Transportation Federal Highway Administration (FHA) gives standards of how bike lanes should be implemented regarding pavement markings and signage. These can include the word, symbol, and arrow size to be used in a bike lane and the width of the lane itself, which ranges from 5 to 7 feet (1.5 to 2.1 m). Cities across America are actively expanding their amount of bike lanes,such as in Boston, Massachusetts, where they have created city-wide goals, Go Boston 2030, to increase their bike network.

== See also ==
- Anti-cycling sentiment – Hostility towards cyclists or cycling infrastructure
- Bikeway safety – Overview of bicycle safety concerns
- Bikeway and legislation – Laws pertaining to the use and ownership of bicycles
- Cyclability – Degree of ease of cycling
- Cycling infrastructure – Facilities for use by cyclists
- History of cycling infrastructure
- Pop-up bicycle lane – Bike path established on short notice
- Shared-use path – Pathway for pedestrians and cyclists
