= Cycling in the Philippines =

Common mode of transport and sport

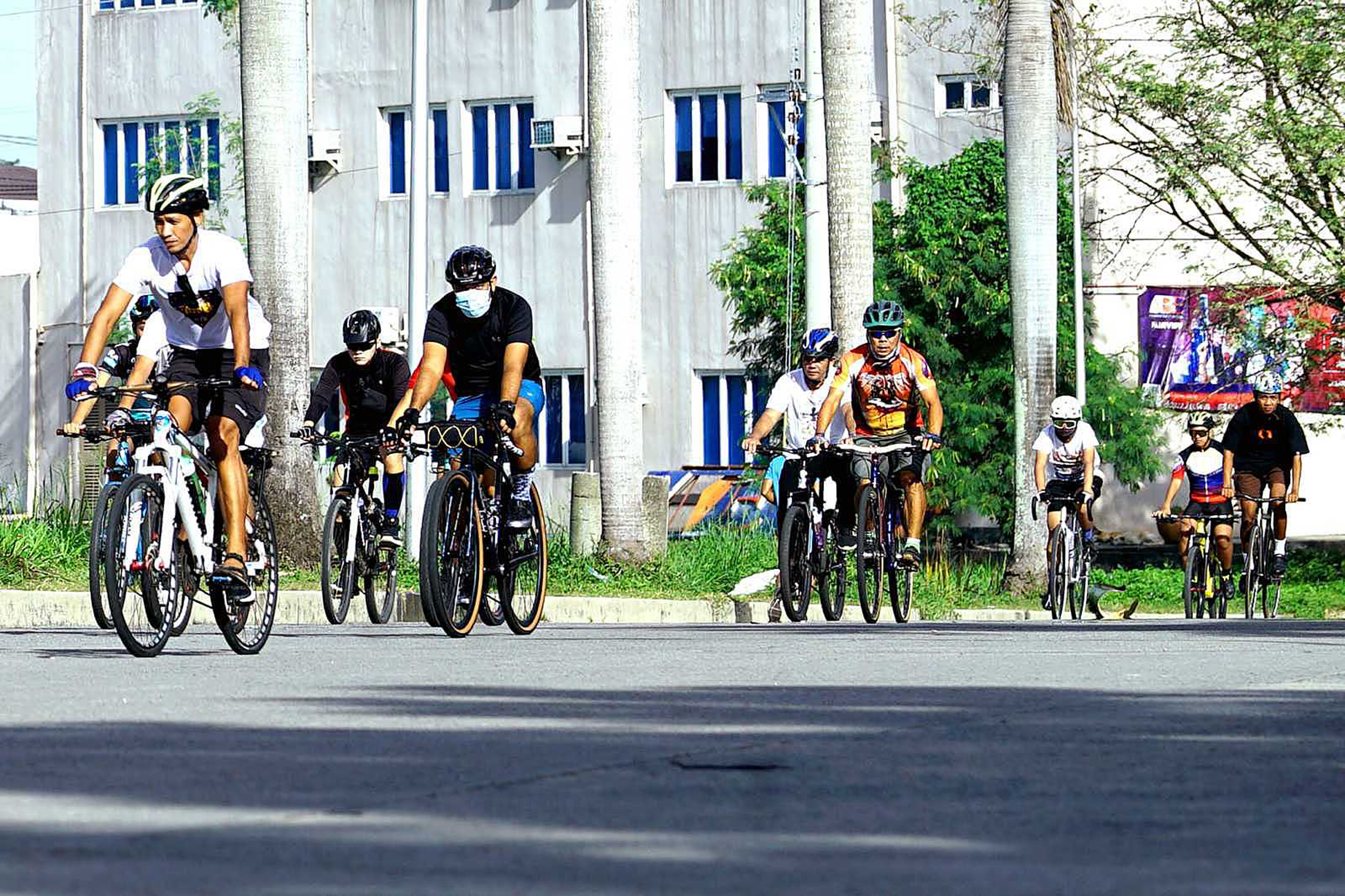
Cyclists in Novaliches, Quezon City

Cycling is a popular mode of transport and recreational sport in the Philippines. Bicycles were first introduced to the archipelago in the 1880s during the Spanish colonial occupation of the Philippines and served as a common mode of transport, especially among the local mestizo population.

In the present day, many of those who cycle in the country mainly do so as a mode of transport and as recreational activities, such as road racing, mountain biking, and recreational cycling. Until the COVID-19 pandemic, the popularity of cycling, however, was initially largely limited to local neighborhoods and rural towns. Most urban areas were considered dangerous for cycling due to the dominance of motorized traffic with little to no cycling infrastructure for protection.

As the pandemic led to the suspension and restriction of public transportation in the country, many Filipinos have recently turned to cycling as an alternative mode of transportation, accelerating the development and promotion of active transportation infrastructure in urban areas.

== History ==
=== Colonial era (1880s–1930s) ===
Bicycles were first introduced to the Philippines in the 1880s, during the Spanish colonial occupation. American author Joseph Earle Stevens, who was living in Manila at the time, described cycling in his journal entries in 1894. He noted it was a booming mode of transport on the streets of Manila, especially among the local mestizo population. He also described bicycle races in Luneta, Manila. On December 18, 1895, while in exile in Dapitan, Philippine national hero Jose Rizal wrote a letter to his mother, requesting that she buy him a second-hand bicycle that he could ride to town.

Following the Spanish Empire's secession of the Philippines to the United States in 1898, bicycles made in the United States found their way into the local streets.

One of the earliest regulations on bicycles was in 1901. Under United States Army Provost Marshal General Arthur MacArthur Jr., the Taft Commission approved City Ordinance No. 11, or "An Ordinance Relating to the Use of the Public Streets and Places of Manila" for the city of Manila. Under Section 21 of this ordinance, bicycles were regarded as vehicles on public streets and were to adhere to traffic ordinances and regulations. Bicycles were required to carry a bell, which was to be sounded when approaching a street intersection or crossing or any vehicle or pedestrian occupying the street. Bicycles were also required to carry a light at night. Bicycle registration was instituted in this era: over 2,000 bicycles were registered from 1904 until registration was halted in 1906.

The recreational use of bicycles was marketed in the country as early as the 1920s, with a July 1926 issue of the Philippine Education Magazine promoting bicycle riding as an economic mode of transport with health benefits.

=== Commonwealth era and WWII ===
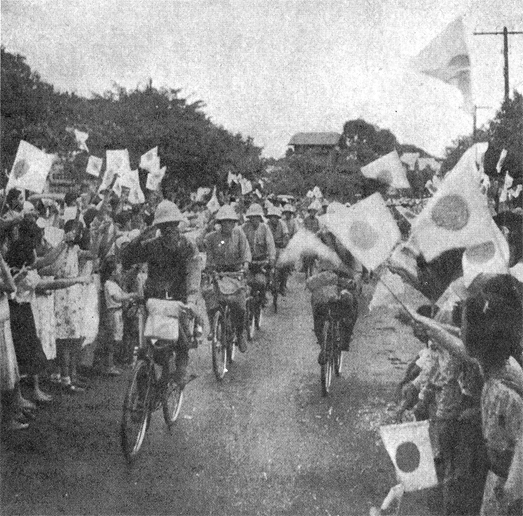
Imperial Japanese Army soldiers entering Manila on bicycles as the city surrenders to the Japanese (1942)

During the Commonwealth period, German engineer Frank Ephraim wrote that, before the Second World War in the Philippines, door-to-door salespeople using bicycles were a common sight on the streets of Manila. He also noted that bicycle theft was rampant during this period, as bicycle owners would lock their bikes with increasingly heavy and expensive chains and padlocks. However, bicycle thieves were typically able to cut the chains or pick the locks, a problem that persists today.

By 1942, over 12,750 bicycles were being used for transport by the 900,000 people in the Manila metropolitan area. During the Japanese occupation in the second World War, the Imperial Japanese Army used bicycle brigades for invasions and patrols, with each officer armed with a sheathed katana and a pistol.

By 1944, the occupying Japanese forces seized carts, bicycles, tricycles, pedicabs, and pushcarts from the local population, crippling local public transportation.

=== Post-WWII ===
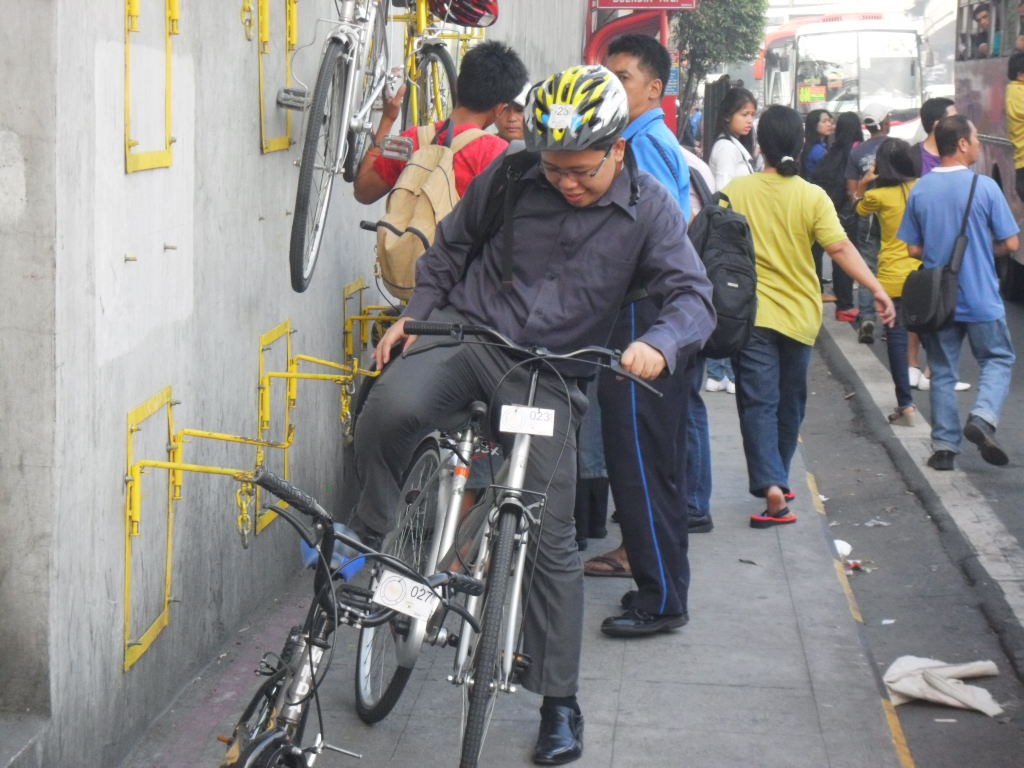
The MMDA's bicycle-sharing system on EDSA in 2013.

After the end of the Second World War, the bicycle continued to serve as a mode of transport for Filipinos, but it was dwarfed by the growth of the automobile, bus, motorized tricycle, and jeepney as primary modes of transport. As a result, the use of bicycles became more limited to areas with little motorized road traffic, as cycling remained popular as a sport and for cyclotourism.

As the road system and inefficient public transportation struggled to cope with population booms and increasing car ownership, people across different socioeconomic backgrounds turned to cycling as a mode of transport. However, the lack of cycling infrastructure in cities has caused many altercations between users of bicycles and motorized vehicles, leading to a growing clamor for active transportation infrastructure to promote cycling as a safe, a sustainable mode of transportation, and to alleviate traffic congestion.

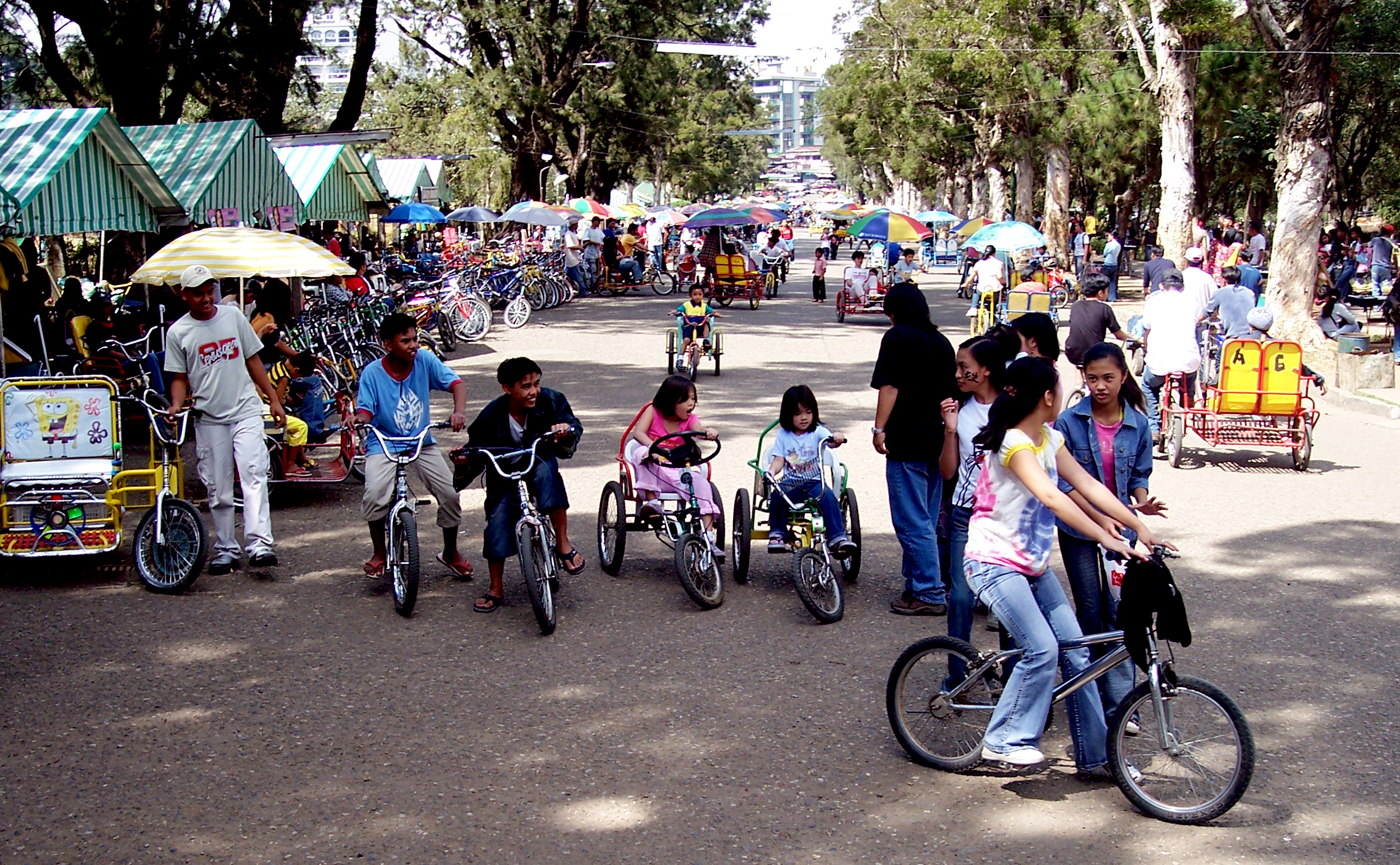
Filipinos cycling at Burnham Park in Baguio

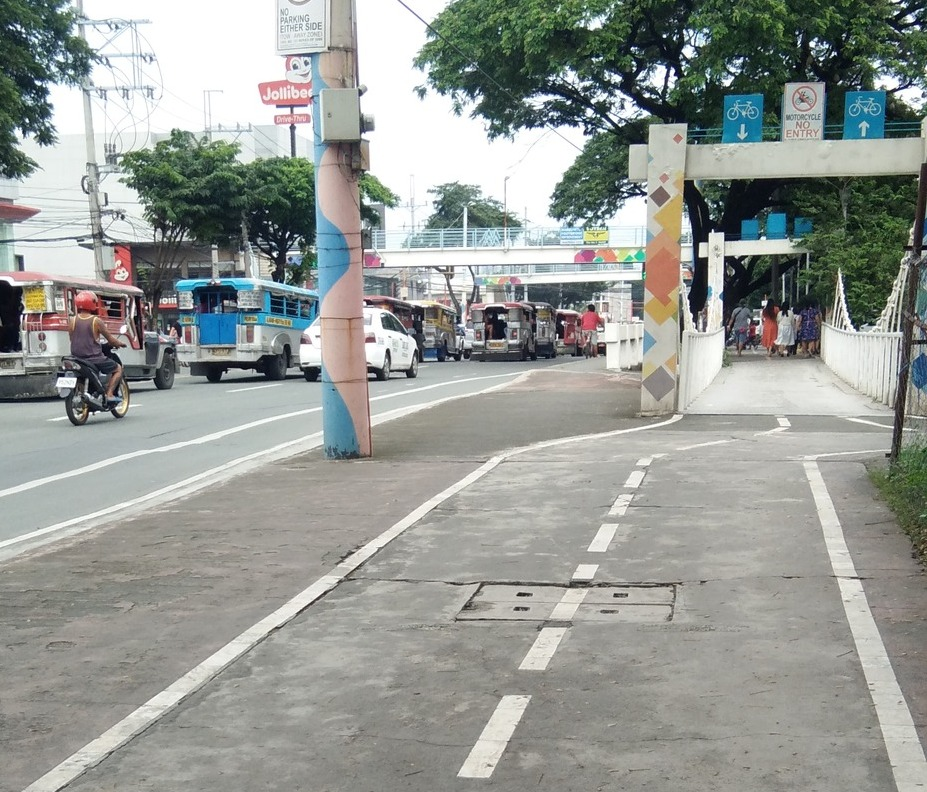
Class I bicycle lane along Sumulong Highway in Marikina, built in 2004

In 2002, Marikina, in Metro Manila, initiated a bikeways program funded by a $1.3 million grant from the Global Environment Facility (GEF), a World Bank–supervised assistance program. A 52-kilometer bike lane network was eventually established in the city, making it the first city in Metro Manila to establish bicycle lanes.

On December 26, 2008, President Gloria Macapagal Arroyo signed an executive order reorganizing the Presidential Task Force on Climate Change to improve the country's response to the climate crisis. The order also created a Task Group on Fossil Fuels (TGFF), headed by the Department of Transportation and Communications (DOTC) to develop a new mobility paradigm favoring non-motorized locomotion, following the principle that "those who have less in wheels must have more in road". This was followed by an administrative order mandating that the DOTC and the TGFF create a "national environmentally sustainable transport strategy" for the country. Later that year, these responsibilities were absorbed by the Climate Change Commission (CCC) created through the Climate Change Act of 2009.

Local government units have since also implemented cycling infrastructure and initiatives in their cities and municipalities, such as Marikina, Quezon City, and Pasig in Metro Manila, Iloilo City in Iloilo, and Vigan in Ilocos Sur. Other cities such as Mandaluyong made plans to establish bicycle routes around their cities.

From 2012 to 2015, the Metropolitan Manila Development Authority (MMDA) and Department of Public Works and Highways (DPWH) established bikeways along various roads in Metro Manila. The first was a bidirectional bike lane on Remedios Street and Remedios Circle in Manila, established on November 15, 2012. This was followed by bidirectional shared-use paths on Commonwealth Avenue in Quezon City, the Marikina-Infanta Highway in Marikina and Pasig, EDSA in Makati, and Roxas Boulevard in Manila. One-way shared-use paths were also established on EDSA in Quezon City, particularly from Ortigas Avenue to White Plains Avenue and along White Plains Avenue. The MMDA also established a bicycle-sharing system in Quezon City and Makati.

Throughout 2018 and 2019, the Quezon City government began establishing bicycle lanes along several major roads. In an interview, Quezon City mayor Herbert Bautista also floated the idea of designating the inner roads of residential subdivisions as cycling corridors.

On February 7, 2019, the DPWH inaugurated the country's first protected bicycle lane along a national highway, located along the Laguna Lake Highway of Circumferential Road 6. The bicycle lane is a 3-meter-wide (9.8 ft) bi-directional bikeway spanning 5.8 kilometers (3.6 mi) of the 6.94 kilometers (4.31 mi) highway, physically separated from the highway with a planting strip.

=== COVID-19 pandemic ===
During the COVID-19 pandemic in early 2020, public transport was suspended and subsequently reopened with limited capacity. As a result, cycling as a mode of transport grew in popularity among Filipinos who needed to go to and from their workplace safely and efficiently. This, alongside decreased road traffic in many urban areas, as a result of the community quarantine classifications, led to the fast-tracked development of active transport infrastructure, such as protected bike lanes and bicycle parking, further encouraging bike ridership.

With the country transitioning into the looser general community quarantine and in anticipation of people returning to work, the MMDA, in coordination with cyclists and scooter riders pushing for permanent active transport infrastructure, conducted a dry run of pop-up bicycle lanes along EDSA, the main thoroughfare in Metro Manila, on July 3, 2020, for World Bicycle Day. The agency also vowed to support the provision of bicycle lanes across the metropolis.

On August 19, 2020, the Department of Health, Department of Transportation, Department of the Interior and Local Government, and Department of Public Works and Highways issued guidelines on the proper use and promotion of active transport amidst and beyond the COVID-19 pandemic.

On September 15, 2020, the Bayanihan to Recover as One Act provided recovery and resilience interventions and mechanisms related to the COVID-19 pandemic. The act declared the need to accommodate alternative modes of transportation, including bicycle lanes on all roads in cities, municipalities, and provinces. It authorized the president to exercise powers necessary to provide emergency pathways, bicycle sharing schemes with safety equipment, and pop-up bicycle lanes, particularly for health workers and other frontline workers. Through the act, the Department of Transportation was allocated ₱1.316 billion to develop accessible sidewalks and protected bicycle lanes, distribute bicycles and safety equipment, and to install bicycle racks.

=== Recent developments ===
On November 18, 2020, President Rodrigo Duterte signed a proclamation declaring every fourth Sunday of November as National Bicycle Day. The proclamation provides legitimacy to the National Bicycle Day initially organized by the National Bicycle Organization, a non-government organization that had hosted the event annually since 2014.

On May 11, 2021, the Land Transportation Office (LTO) released an administrative order defining the classification, registration, and operation of electric vehicles and allowing personal mobility scooters, electric kick scooters, and light electric vehicles under classifications L1a and L2a to use bicycle lanes. On February 21, 2024, the LTO amended this order to require that all electric vehicles, including electric bicycles and scooters, be registered when used on public roads.

On November 28, 2021, coinciding with National Bicycle Day, the Department of Transportation announced that it would be working with Google to push for the inclusion of the nationwide bicycle lane network into Google Maps.

On April 15, 2022, the Electric Vehicle Industry Development Act, which was passed to promote the manufacturing and use of electric vehicles, declared the need to provide options for micromobility through light electric vehicles (LEVs). The act states that local government units should provide segregated lanes for LEVs on all major local and national roads, which may be integrated with bicycle lanes in coordination with the Department of Public Works and Highways.

In December 2022, the National Economic and Development Authority (NEDA) approved the Philippine Development Plan (PDP) for 2023 to 2028, which outlined that pedestrians and cyclists should be accorded the highest priority among all road users in transport-related infrastructure.

On November 28, 2023, President Bongbong Marcos declared the last working day of November as National Bike to Work Day.

In 2026, high oil prices resulting from the conflict in Iran resulted in higher fuel costs in the Philippines. These increases resulted in reduced public transportation trips and encouraged some motorists to shift towards more fuel-efficient and active forms of mobility, including cycling.

== Bicycle lane network ==
A nationwide bicycle lane network was established in response to the popularity of cycling as a mode of transport due to the COVID-19 pandemic and to encourage the use of bicycles and other light mobility vehicles as a safe, healthy, and sustainable means of transport.

In 2021, the Department of Transportation and Department of Public Works and Highways established the Metropolitan Bike Lane Networks, which consist of paint-delineated and physically-protected bicycle lanes and other bicycle-related infrastructure in Metro Manila, Metro Cebu, and Metro Davao. It is also known as the Bayanihan II Bike Lane Networks as it was funded through the Bayanihan to Recover as One Act. The Metropolitan Bike Lane Networks were inaugurated on July 28, 2021, with a total of 497 kilometers (309 mi) of bicycle lanes in the country's metropolitan areas: 313 kilometers (194 mi) in Metro Manila, 129 kilometers (80 mi) in Metro Cebu, and 55 kilometers (34 mi) in Metro Davao.

As of March 2023, the Department of Transportation has established 564 kilometers (350 mi) of bicycle lanes since 2020, with plans to expand the network to 470 kilometers (290 mi) within the year. The DOTr plans to establish new bicycle lanes in the Ilocos Region, Central Luzon, Metro Manila, Southern Tagalog, Bicol Region, Western Visayas, Central Visayas, Eastern Visayas, and Davao Region, with the national government planning to build a total of 2,400 kilometers (1,500 mi) of bicycle lanes nationwide by the end of the presidency of Bongbong Marcos in 2028.

=== Bicycle lane classifications ===
The Department of Public Works and Highways and the Department of Transportation, through DPWH Department Order No. 88 series of 2020, divides bicycle lanes or bikeways into three classes, based on prevailing road and traffic conditions. The order also requires that all new road and bridge construction and expansion projects must incorporate bicycle lanes with an absolute minimum width of 2.44 m (8.0 ft) These guidelines were then updated in December 2022, through DPWH Department Order No. 263 series of 2022.

Under these guidelines, the maximum slope grade of all bicycle lane crossings and Class I bicycle lanes should not exceed 5 percent, while Class II and Class III bicycle lanes must follow the slope grade of the roadway. In addition, Class I and Class II bicycle lanes have a maximum speed limit of 25 km/h (16 mph) and are exclusive to the use of non-motorized vehicles and light electric vehicles with a maximum vehicle weight of 50 kg (110 lb).

These guidelines only apply to bicycle lanes set up by the national government. They do not apply to bicycle lanes set up by local government units or private developments.

Key
Class I and IIa	Shared Use Path or Separated Bike Lane (Physical Separation)
Class IIb	Separated Bike Lane (Pavement Markings)
Class III	Shared Roadway

Criteria for Bicycle Lanes Classifications on Roads
Motor Vehicle Volume (AADT)	Motor Vehicle Operating Speed		
Motor Vehicle Volume (AADT)	Under 40 km/h	40 to 50 km/h	Over 60 km/h
Over 6,000	Class I and IIa	Class I and IIa	Class I and IIa
3,000 to 6,000	Class IIb	Class IIb	Class I and IIa
Under 3,000	Class III	Class II	Class I and IIa

==== Class I ====
Class I bicycle lanes are shared use paths or bike paths that are completely separated from the roadway, designated for the exclusive use of bicycles, or shared with pedestrians.

The minimum clear width of a Class I bicycle lane is 3.00 m (9.84 ft), which may be widened to 4.3 m (14 ft) in high traffic areas or briefly narrowed to 1.50 to 2.44 m (4.9 to 8.0 ft) in narrow road sections. Class I bicycle lanes are separated from motor vehicle roadways by open spaces, have line markings delineating the paths for cycling and pedestrian traffic, and are recommended for roads with high traffic volume (annual average daily traffic (AADT) of 6,000 to 8,000 vehicles or more) and an operating speed of 50 kilometers per hour (31 mph) or higher.

Examples of Class I lanes
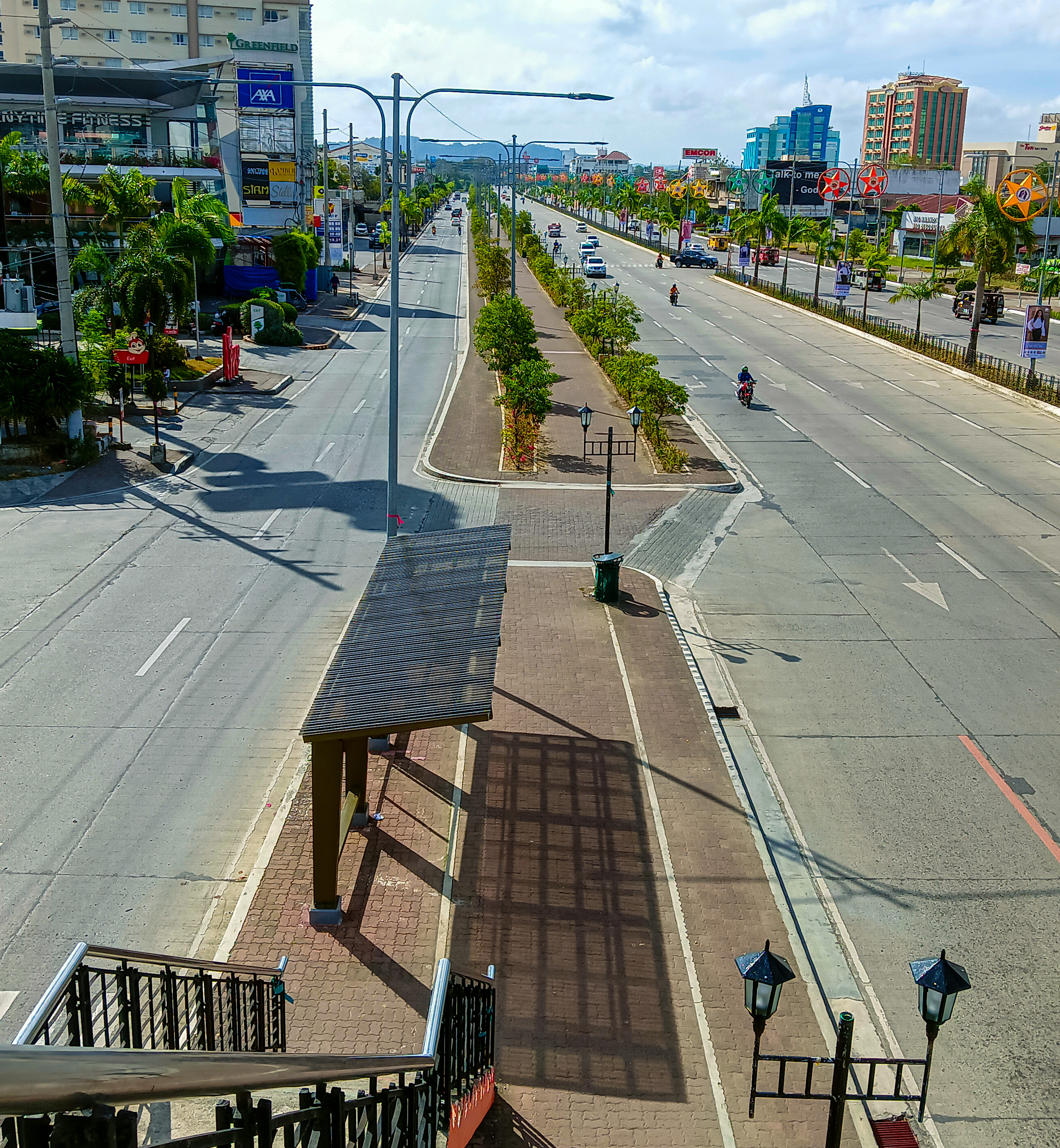
Class I bicycle and jogging lane along the Iloilo Diversion Road in Iloilo City

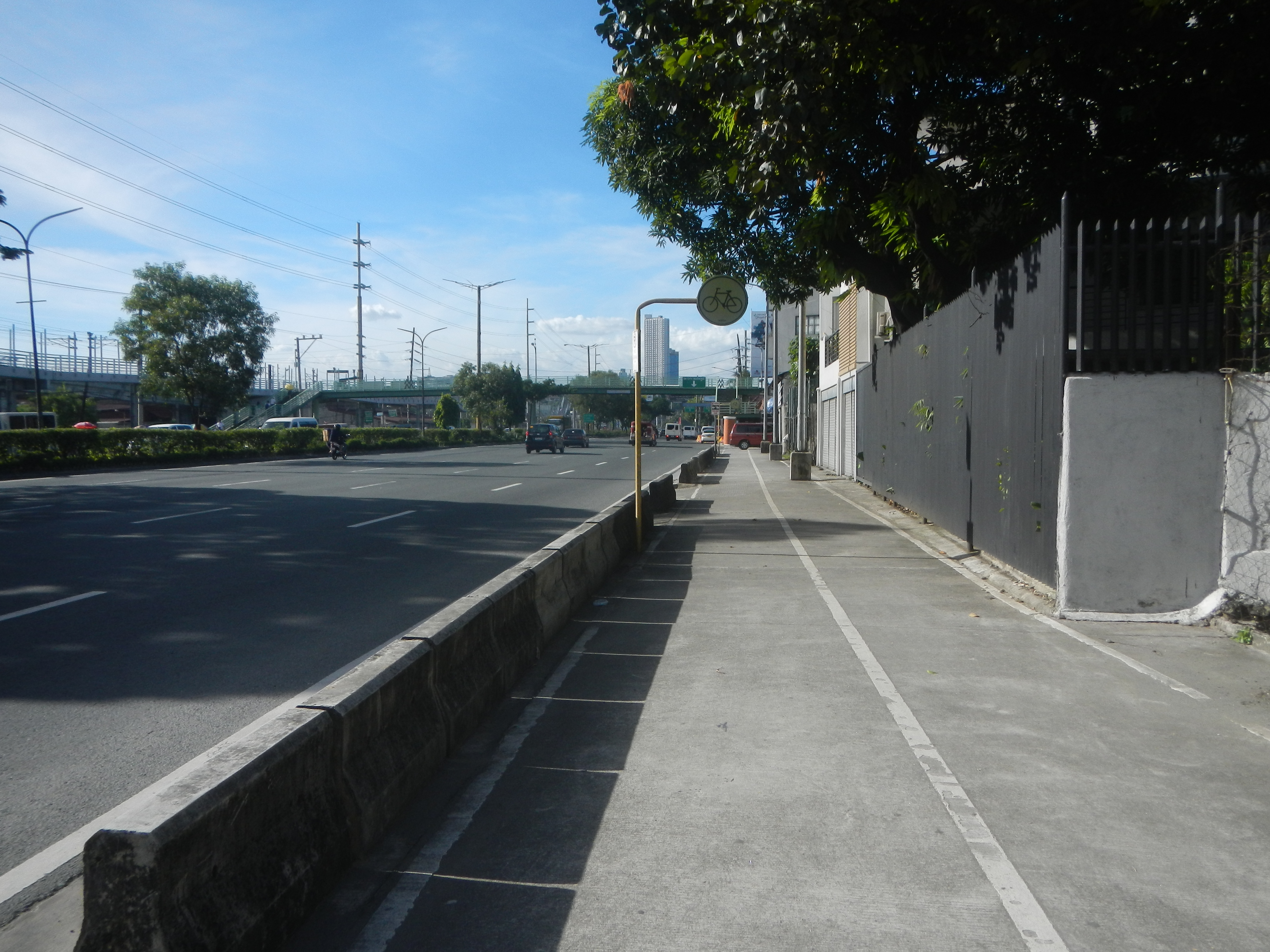
Class I bicycle lanes along the Marikina–Infanta Highway in Santolan, Pasig

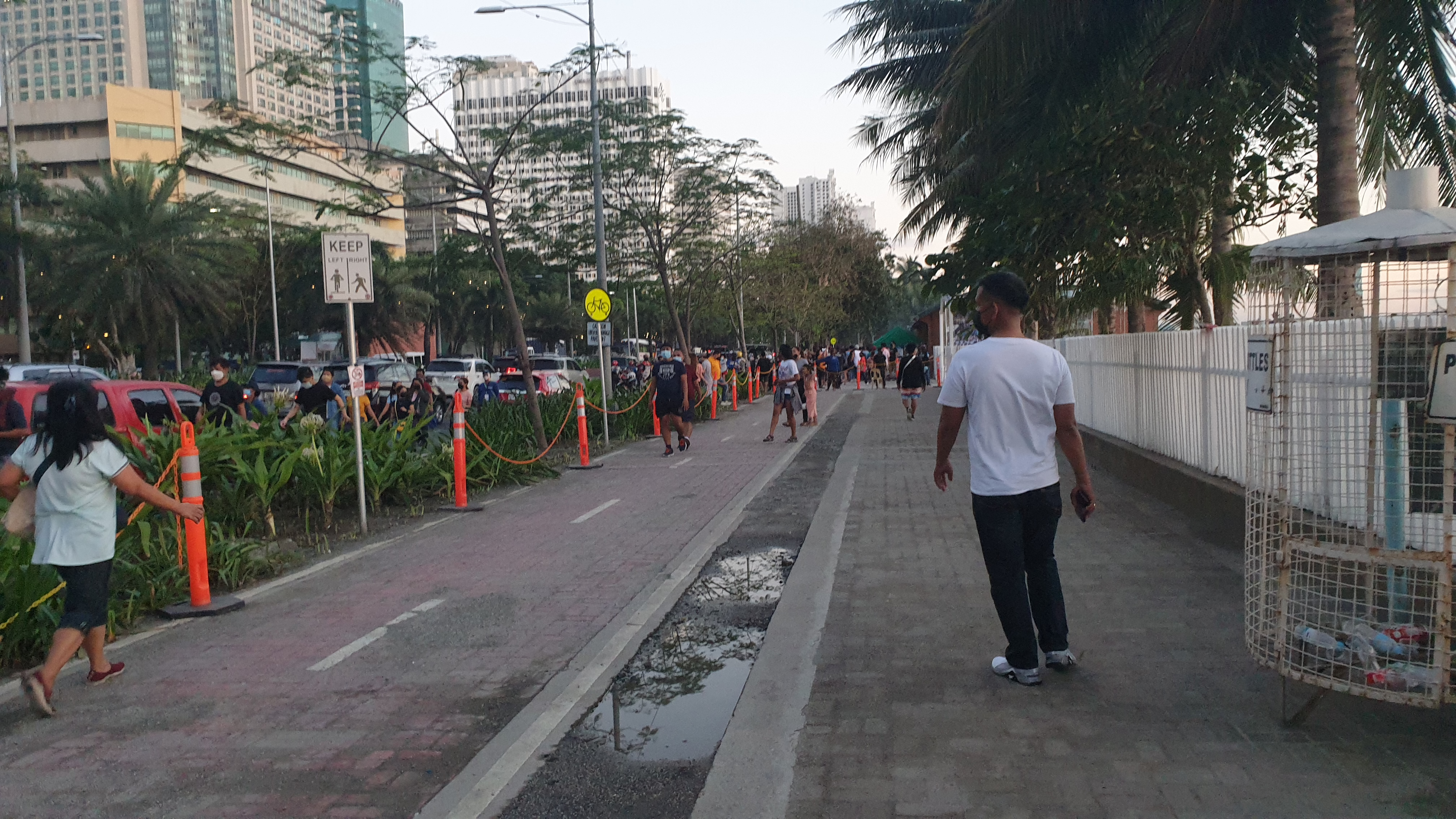
Class I bicycle lane with plant median and curb separation along Roxas Boulevard in Manila

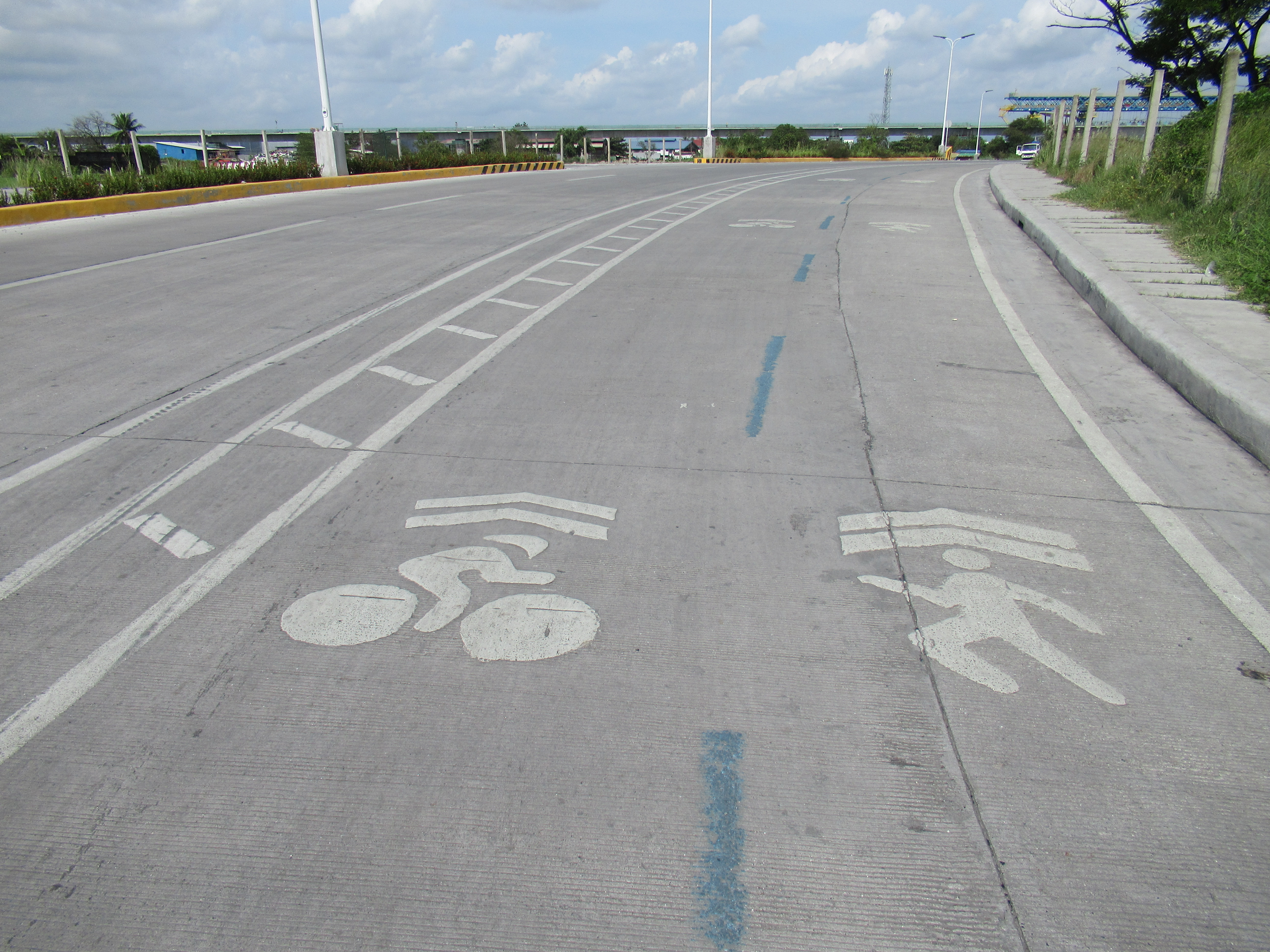
Class I bicycle and jogging lane along the Ciudad de Victoria Bypass Road in Biñang, Bocaue

==== Class II ====
Class II bicycle lanes are separated bicycle lanes on a portion of the road for the exclusive use of bicycles. These are divided into Class IIa bicycle lanes, which use physical separation, and Class IIb bicycle lanes, which use pavement markings.

A unidirectional Class II bicycle lane has a minimum clear width of 2.44 m (8.0 ft) or briefly narrowed to 1.50 m (4.9 ft) in narrow road sections. Class IIa bicycle lanes are distinguished by physical separation using bollards, curbs, plant boxes, concrete barriers, or a median strip with elevation changes, similar to cycle tracks. Class IIb bicycle lanes are distinguished by painted green and white pavement markings.

Pavement markings are recommended on roads with low to moderate traffic volume (AADT of 3,000 to 6,000 vehicles) and an operating speed of 40 to 50 kilometers per hour (25 to 31 mph), while physical separation is recommended on roads with high traffic volume (an AADT of 6,000 to 8,000 vehicles or more) and an operating speed of 50 kilometers per hour (31 mph) or higher. Class II bicycle lanes may also be supplemented with a 1 m (3.3 ft) buffer zone between the bicycle lane and other road lanes.

Examples of Class II lanes
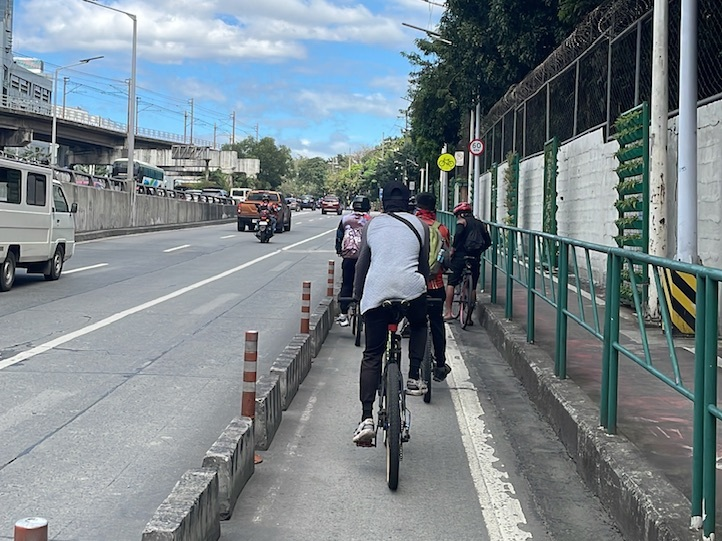
Physically-separated Class II bicycle lane along EDSA in Quezon City

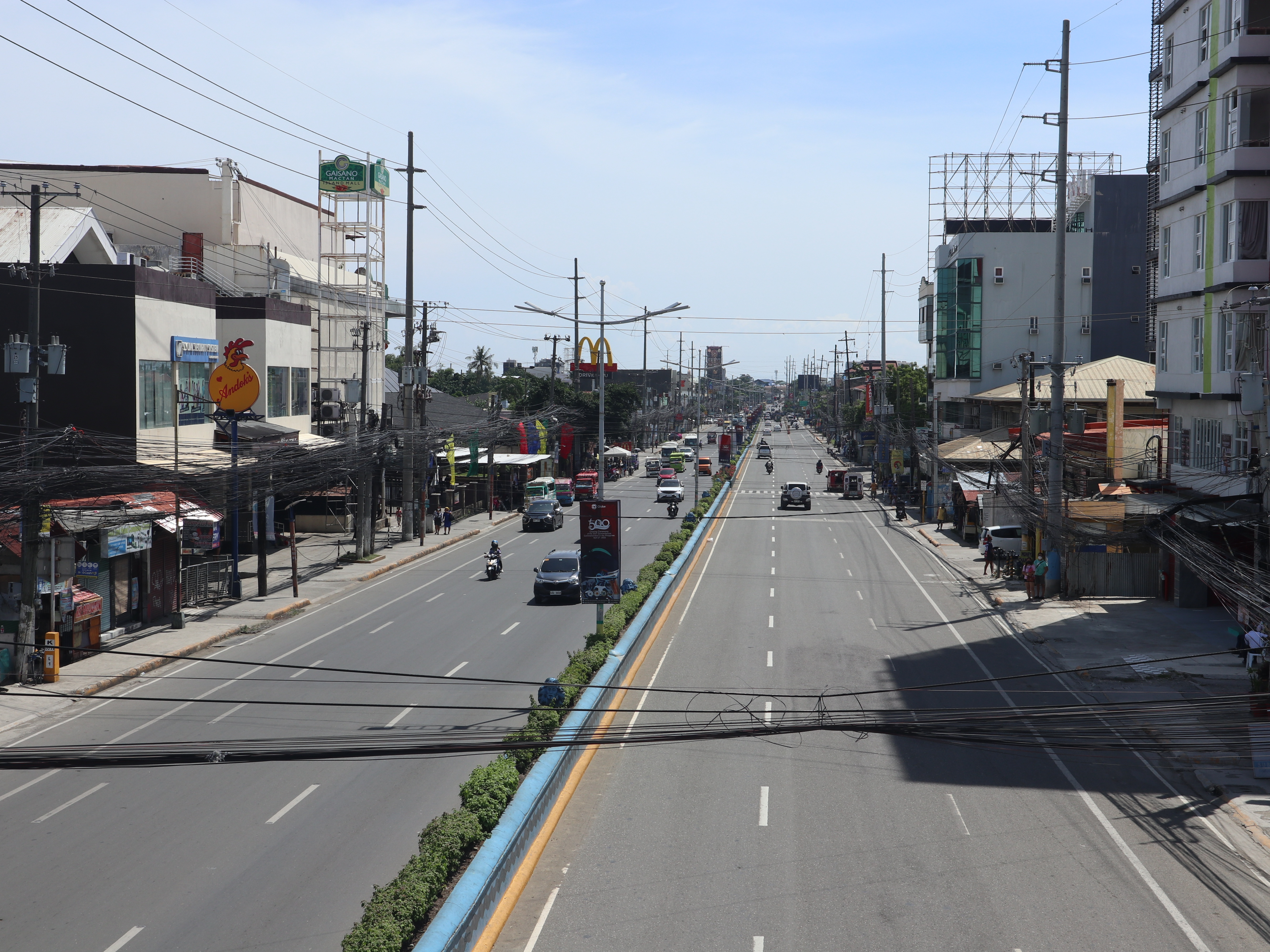
Paint-separated Class II bicycle lane along Manuel L. Quezon National Highway in Lapu-Lapu City

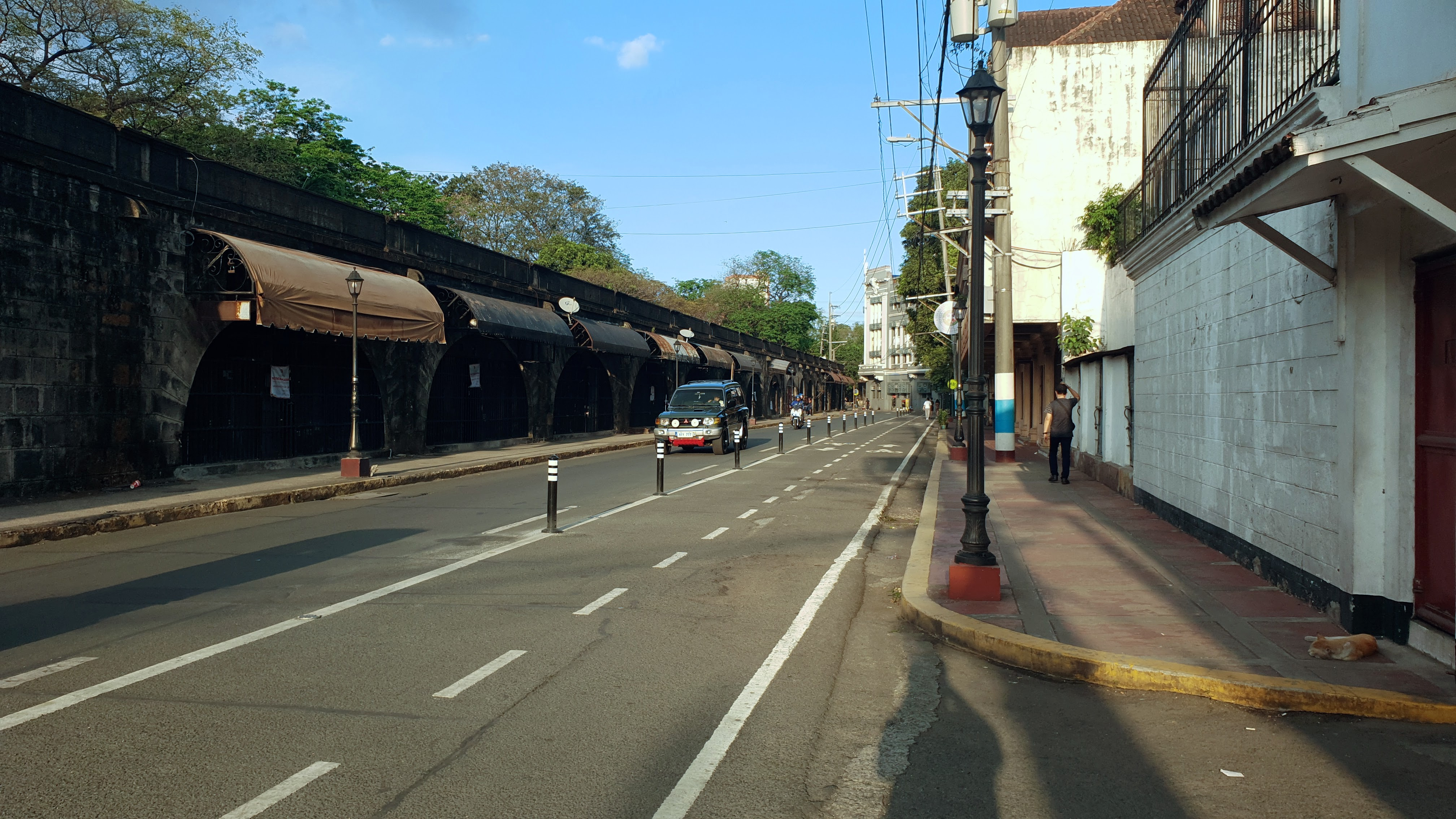
Bollard-separated Class II bidirectional bicycle lanes along Muralla Street in Intramuros

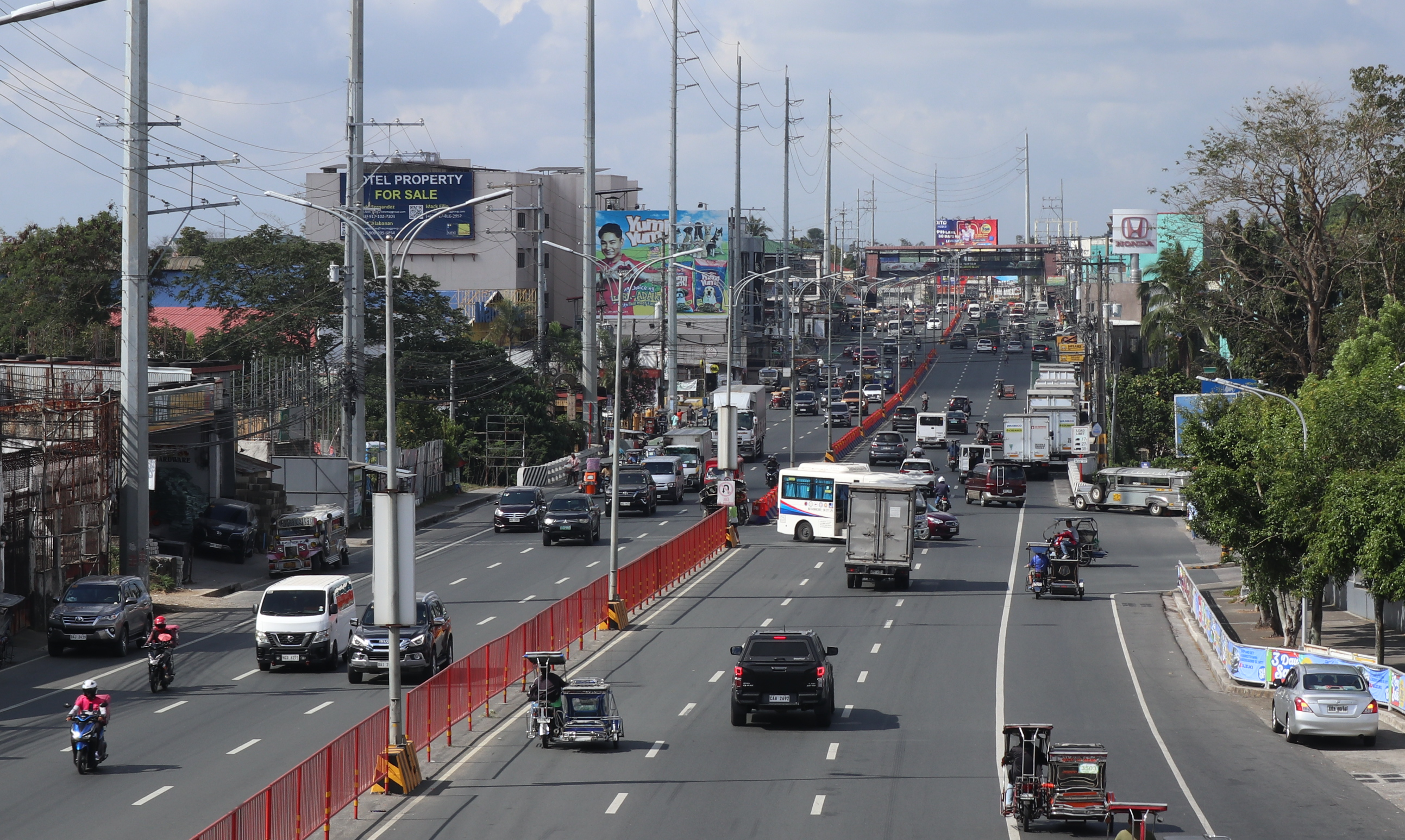
Paint-separated Class II bicycle lane along Ayala Highway in Lipa, Batangas

==== Class III ====
Class III bicycle lanes are shared roadways, used by both motor vehicles and bicycles but officially designated as bicycle routes.

These are placed on roads with a lane width of 3.35 to 4.20 m (11.0 to 13.8 ft), operating speeds not exceeding 40 km/h (25 mph), low volume of traffic (AADT of not more than 3,000 vehicles), and limited carriageway width. These routes are distinguished by signs encouraging road users to be mindful of cyclists. Class III bicycle lanes may also contain brief sections of non-exclusive 1.5 m (4.9 ft) painted bicycle lanes with broken lines to limit the movement of cycling traffic on narrow roads.

Class III bicycle lanes may also be used as temporary bicycle lanes until more appropriate infrastructure can be implemented.

Examples of Class III lanes
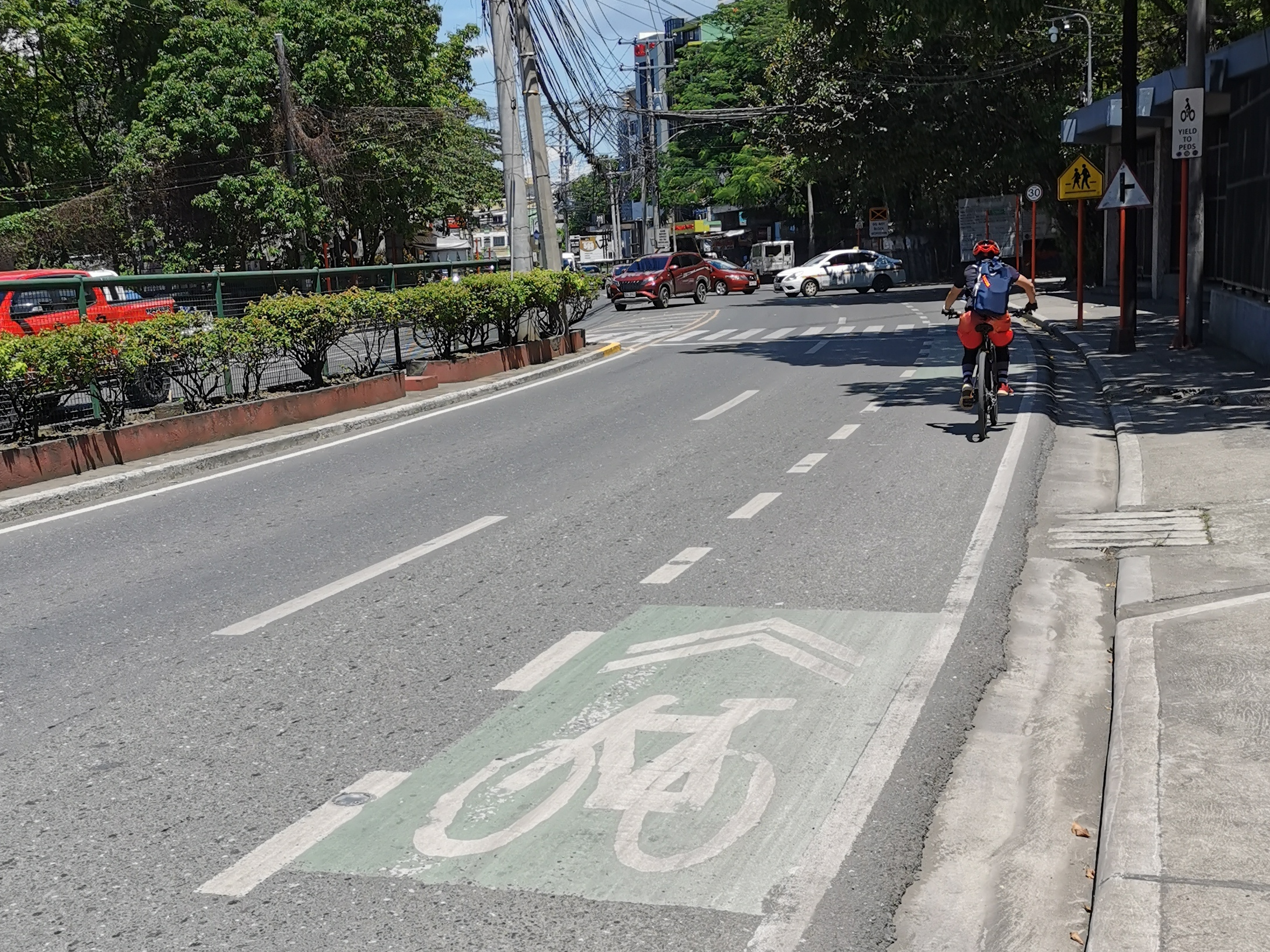
Shared roadway along Elpidio Quirino Avenue in Davao City

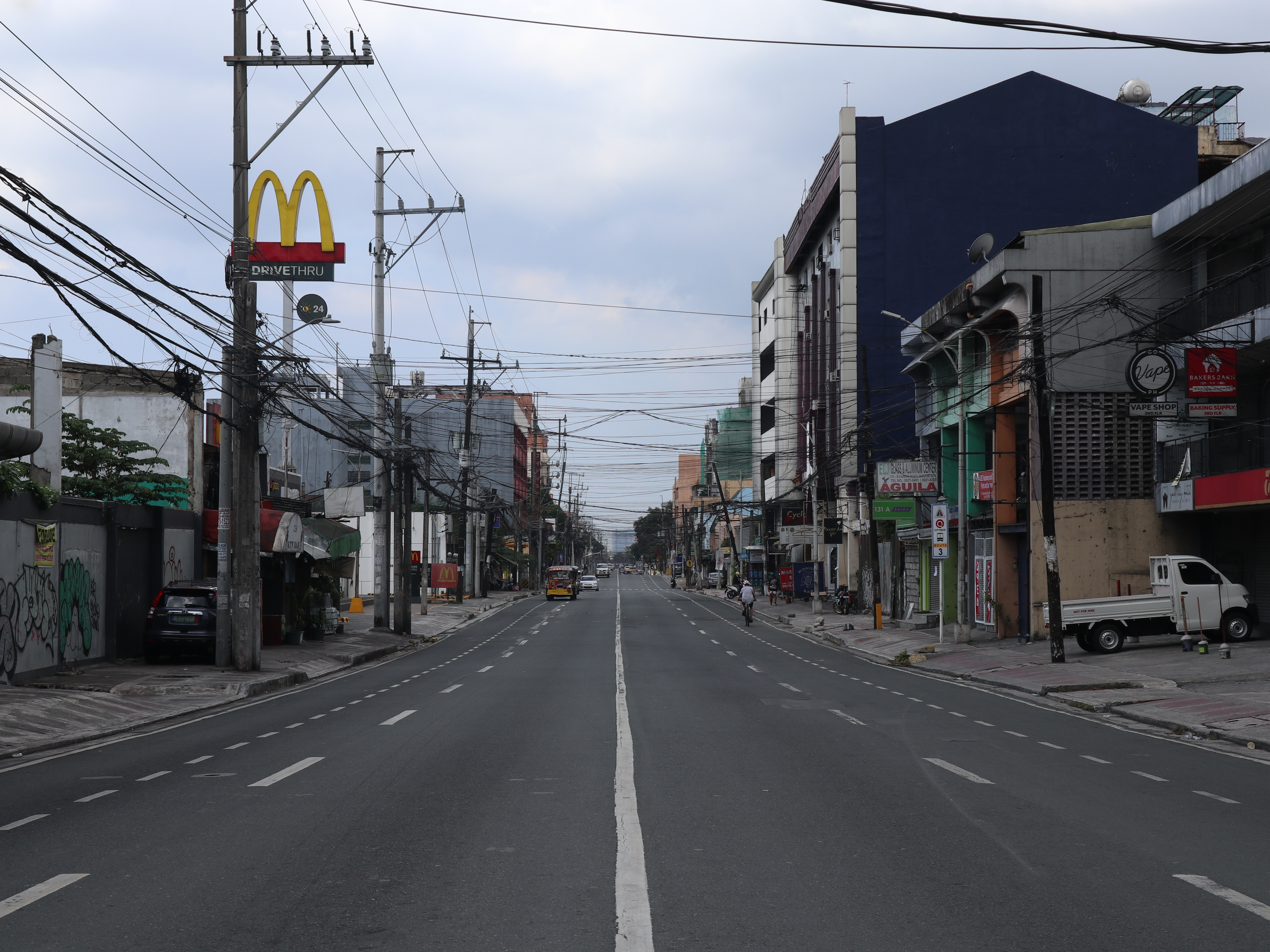
Shared roadway along Kamias Road in Quezon City

=== Private developments ===
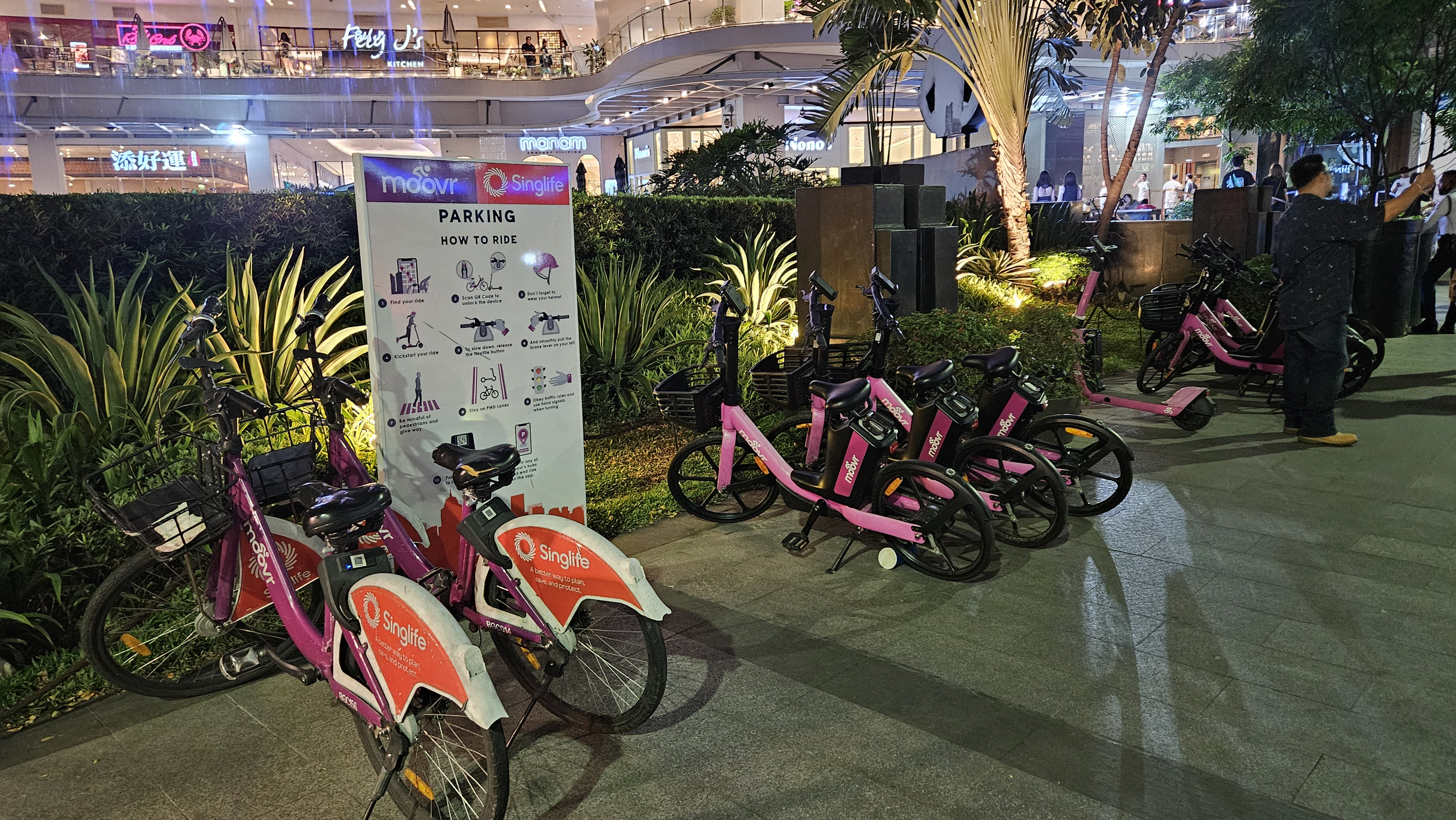
Moovr e-bike and e-scooter bicycle-sharing system in Bonifacio Global City in Taguig

Many mixed-use developments and planned communities owned and managed by private real estate companies across the country have also incorporated bicycle lanes in their developments. These bicycle lanes are typically not within the jurisdiction of the national or local governments but may be integrated into existing networks.

Some examples of private developments with bicycle lanes include Bonifacio Global City in Taguig, the Megaworld Corporation's Arcovia City, Ortigas Land's Capitol Commons in Pasig, and the Nuvali development of Ayala Land in Laguna. Bicycle lanes are also present along Ayala Avenue, the main road of the Makati Central Business District in Makati. Additionally, some shopping malls have bicycle lanes in their vicinity, such as the SM Mall of Asia in Pasay and SM Seaside City in Cebu City.

Higher education institutions in the Philippines have also incorporated bicycle lanes on their campuses. Some examples are at the University of the Philippines Diliman, Ateneo de Manila University, and De La Salle University – Laguna Campus.

Examples of bicycle lanes in private developments
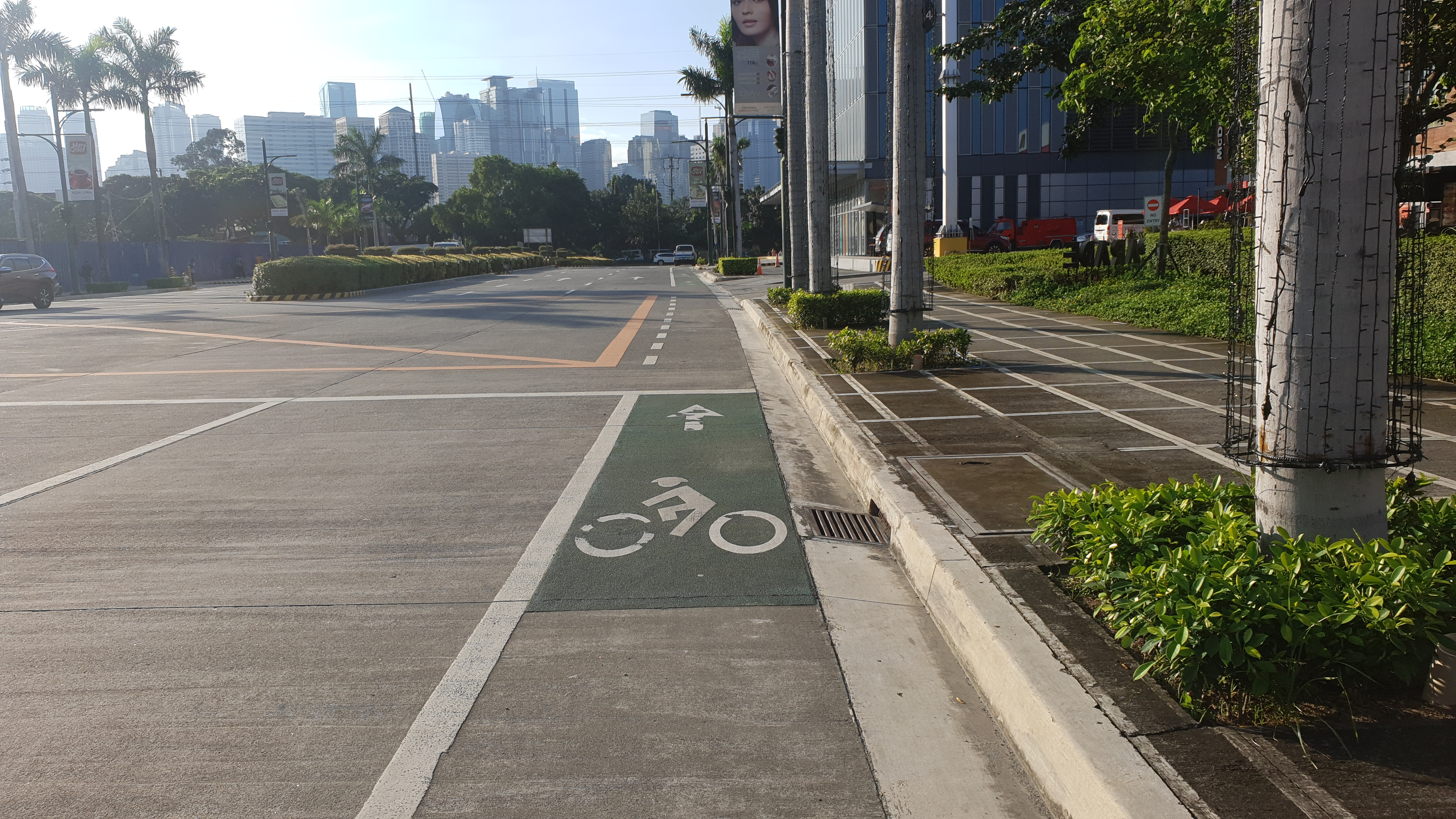
Paint-separated bicycle lane in Arcovia City in Pasig

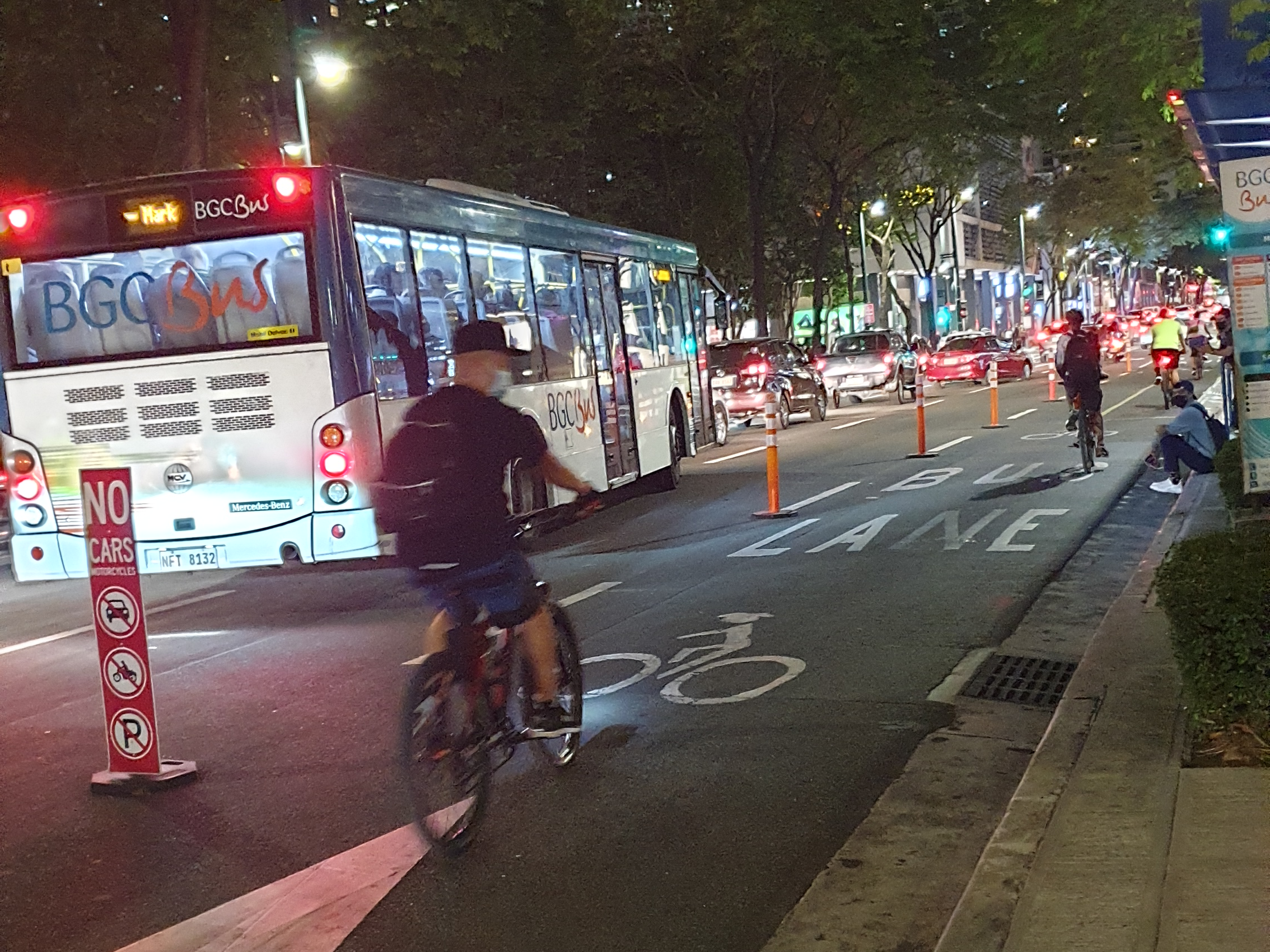
Bollard-separated bicycle lane in Bonifacio Global City in Taguig

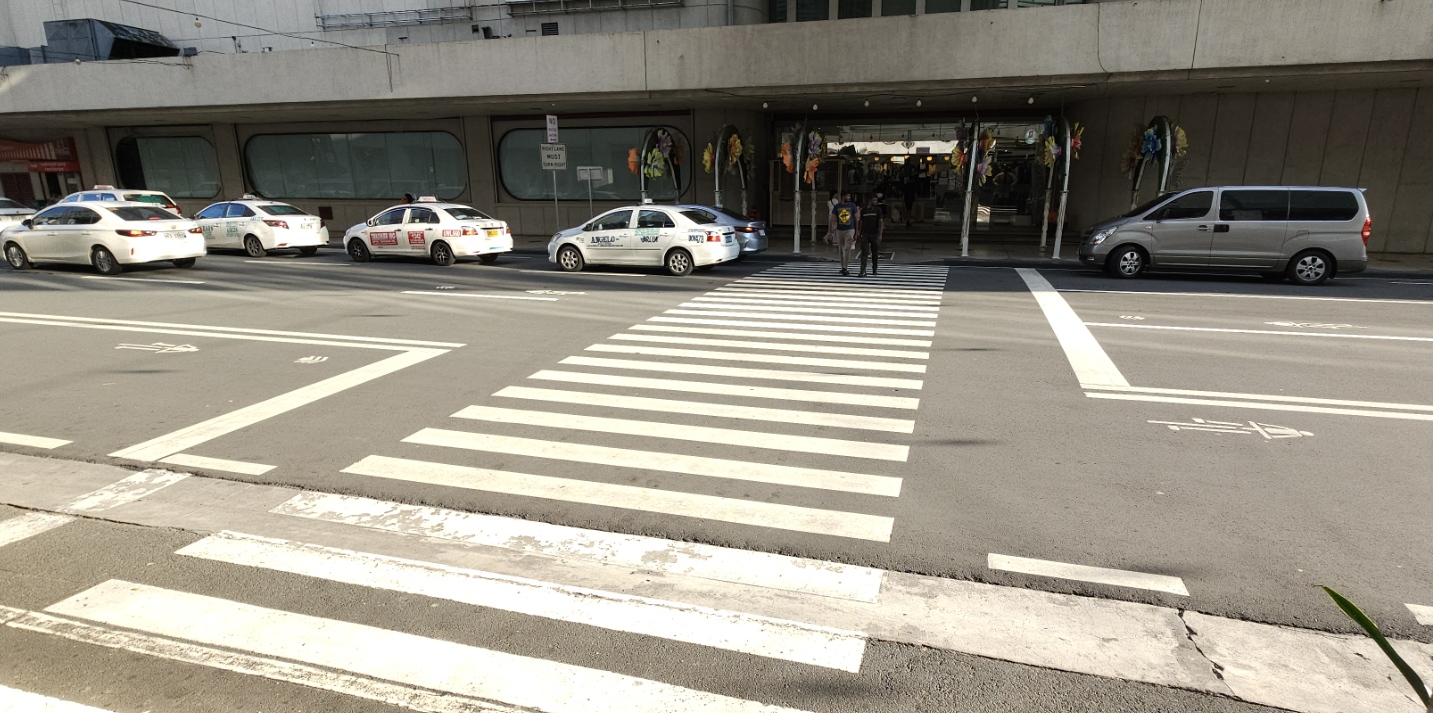
Sharrows along Parkway Drive in Ayala Center in Makati

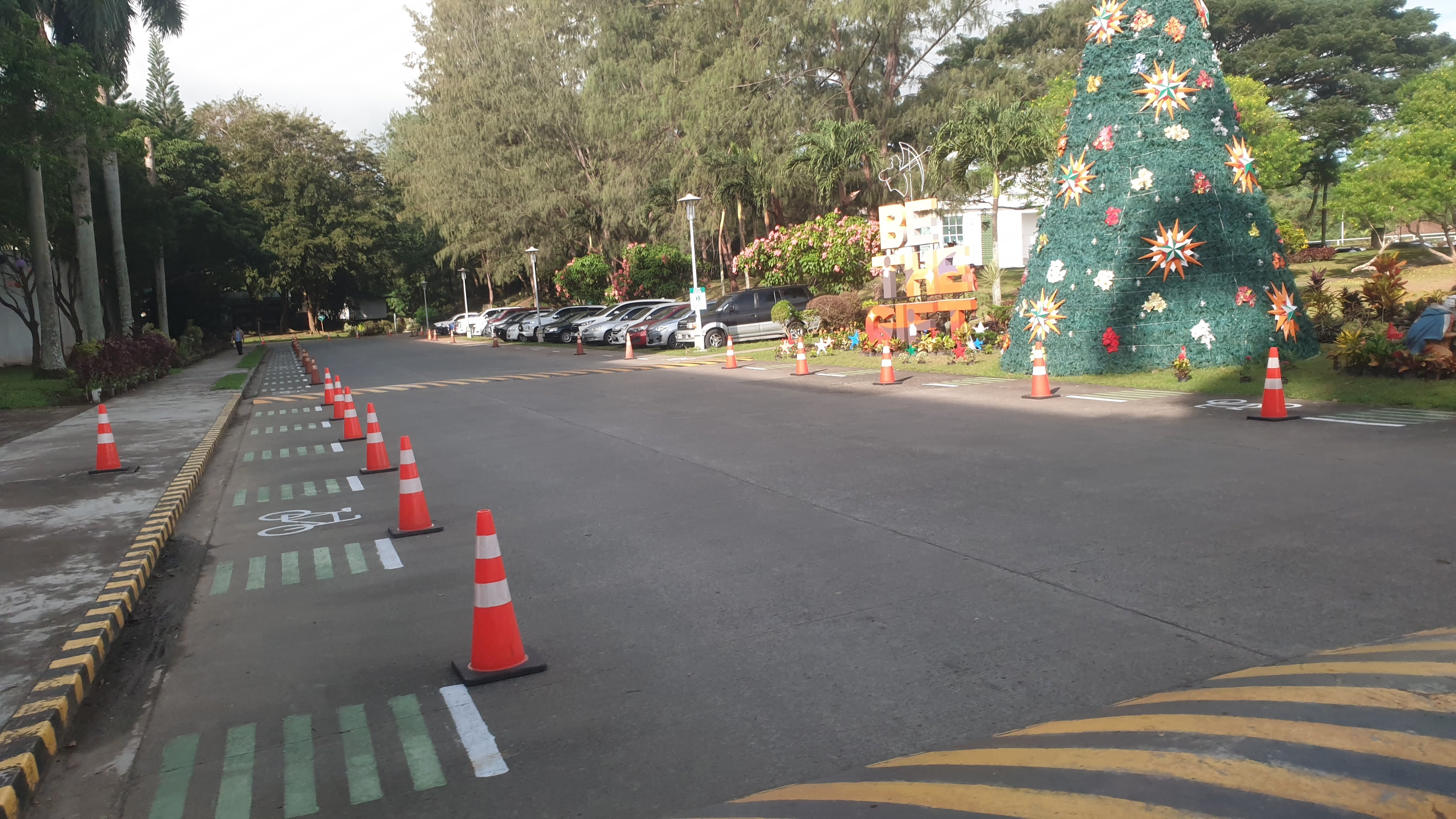
Cone-separated bicycle lanes in De La Salle University Laguna Campus in Biñan

== Other bicycle infrastructure ==
=== Bicycle parking ===
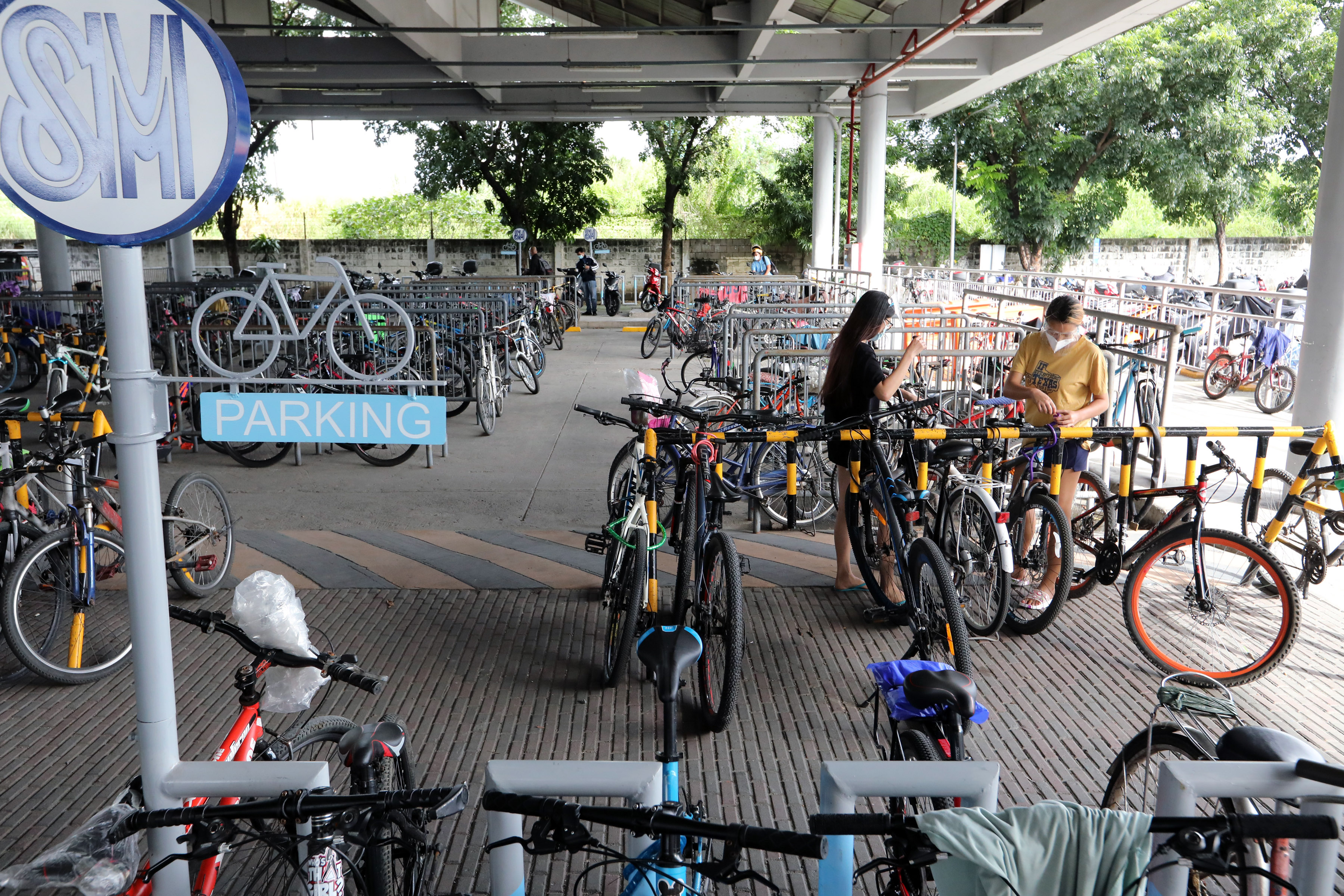
Bicycle parking at SM City East Ortigas in Pasig

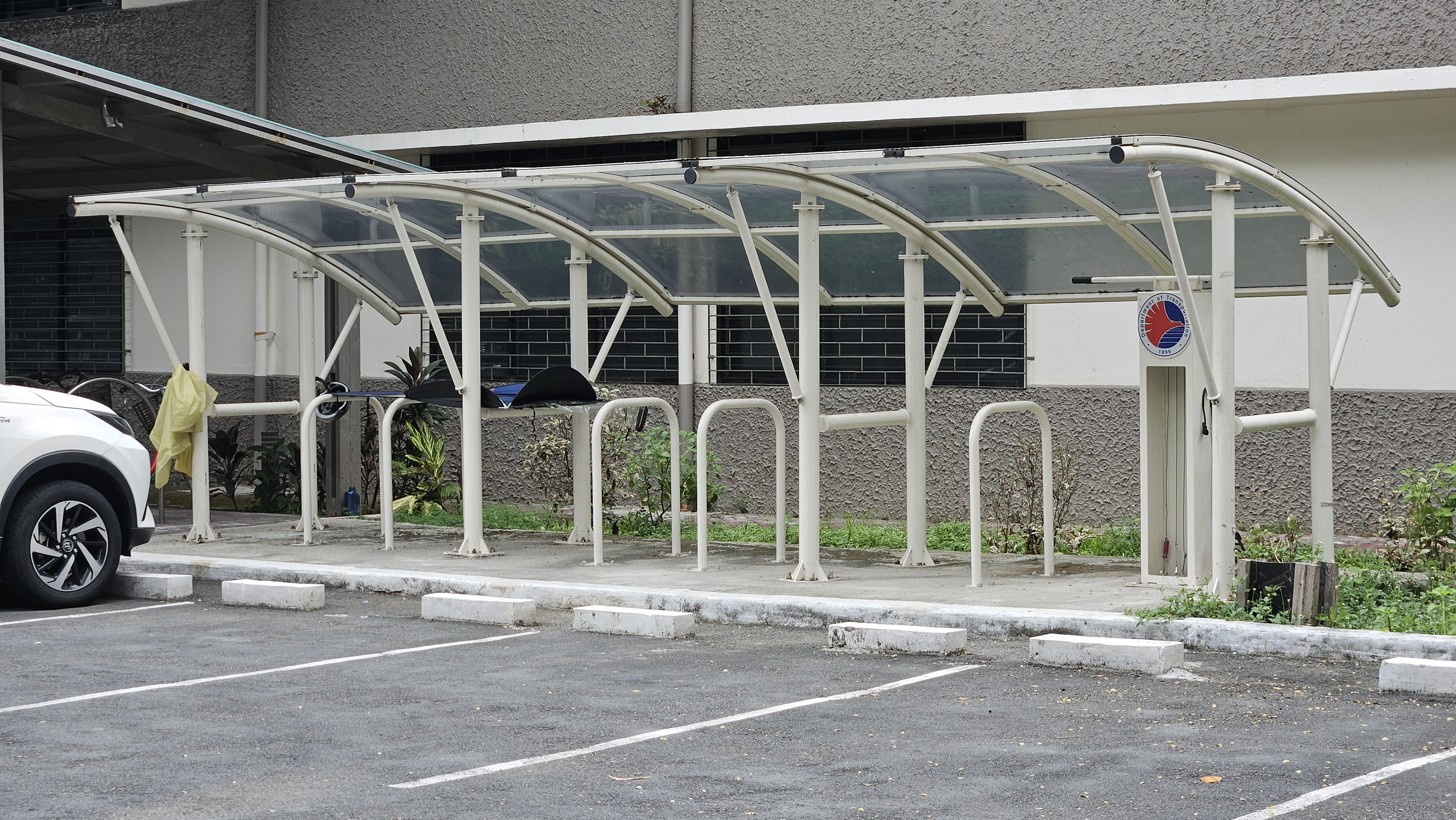
Bicycle shed at Yakal Residence Hall on the UP Diliman campus

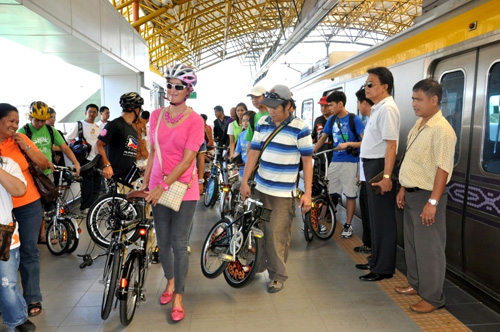
Bicycle commuters using LRT Line 2 during the inauguration of the "Bike On, Bike Off" project (2009)

The use of bicycles as transportation is supported by the inclusion of bicycle parking in public spaces. The Department of Public Works and Highways (DPWH) decrees that short-term bicycle parking facilities such as bicycle parking racks and sheds and bicycle repair stations should be located 15 to 30 m (49 to 98 ft) from schools, stores, shopping centers, parks and plazas, and transit stops. The DPWH also calls for the presence of trip-end facilities and long-term bicycle parking facilities such as bicycle lockers for all-day or overnight use.

Educational institutions such as the Ateneo de Manila University, De La Salle University, and the University of Santo Tomas provide bicycle racks, that are free of charge, on their respective campuses. The University of the Philippines Diliman has a bicycle-sharing system run by UP Bike Share, a student-led organization.

=== Intermodal transport ===
On November 8, 2009, the Light Rail Transit Authority (LRTA) inaugurated its "Bike On, Bike Off" or "Bike O2" project, allowing folding bicycles to be brought onto Line 1 and Line 2 trains, for free, to promote bimodal transportation and reduce traffic on the road. Folding bicycles are allowed onboard trains if they do not exceed the LRTA's baggage size limitations of 2 by 2 feet (61 by 61 cm). Starting February 1, 2012, after much persuasion from advocacy groups, MRT Line 3 began allowing folding bicycles on trains, albeit only those with wheels not more than 20 inches (51 cm) in diameter.

In 2020, bicycle racks were installed at stations of Lines 1, 2, and 3 of the PNR Metro Commuter Line. The Philippine National Railways allows folding bicycles on its trains, charging the bicycle a fare equivalent to one person's fare. The Pasig River Ferry Service, operated by the MMDA, allows both folded and full-sized bicycles to be carried onboard, free of charge.

=== Pedestrian facilities ===
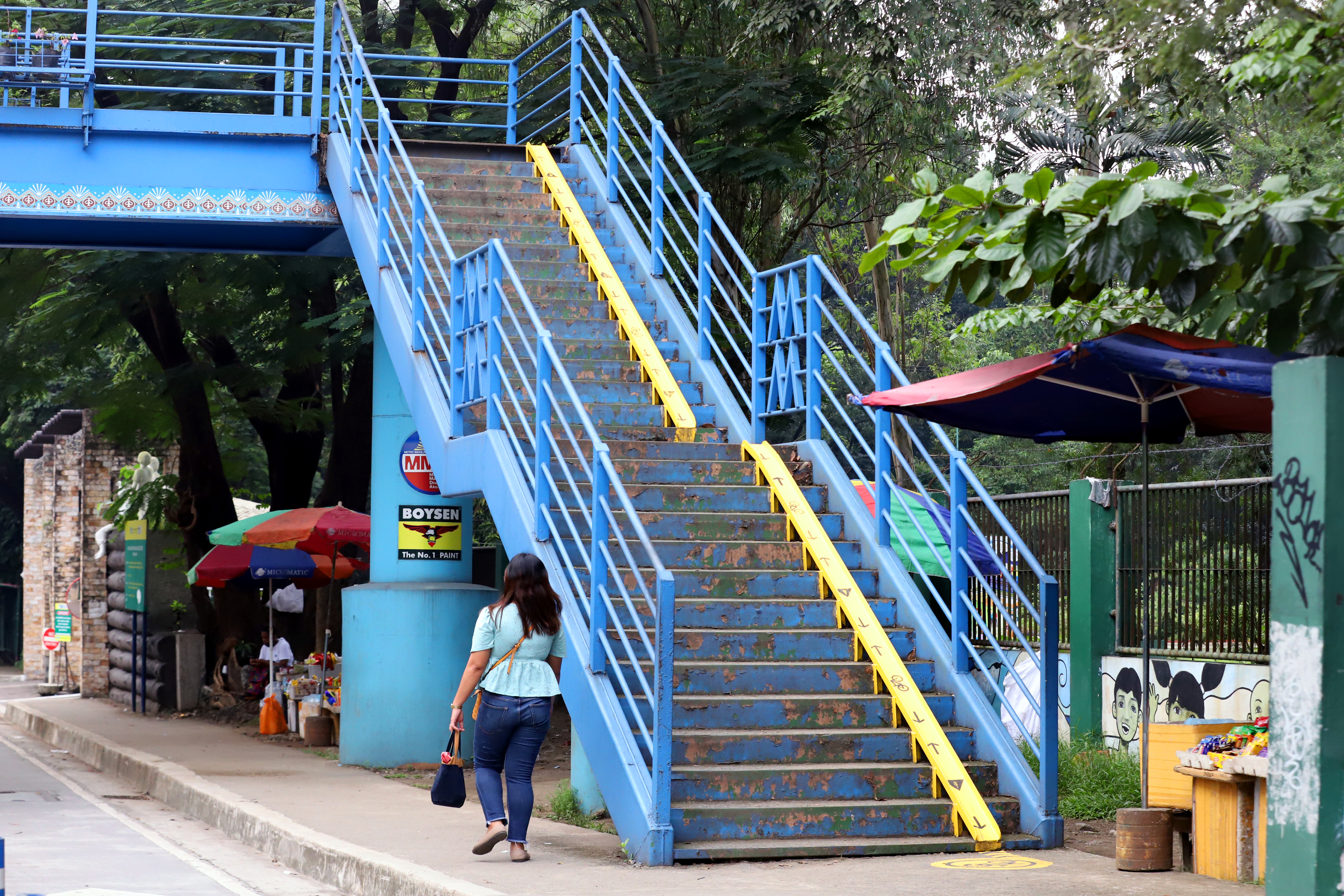
A bicycle ramp installed on a pedestrian footbridge along Quezon Avenue, Quezon City (2022)

Several pedestrian footbridges and underpasses, particularly in Quezon City, have also been outfitted with bicycle ramps to allow cyclists to bring their bicycles on them.

== Bicycle use and ownership data ==
=== MMUTIS Capacity Enhancement Project ===
As part of the MMUTIS Capacity Enhancement Project (MUCEP) of the Japan International Cooperation Agency (JICA) and the then-Department of Transportation and Communications, several household interviews on transport characteristics and patterns were conducted in Metro Manila from 2012 to 2014. Data from the MUCEP database reveals that 3,233 household interview respondents had made bicycle trips. The respondents were predominantly male by a 12:1 ratio, mainly from the 19 to 59 age brackets, and mostly had a personal monthly income of less than ₱10,000. Blue-collar workers comprised the majority of these respondents, at 75.5 percent, while white-collar workers only comprised 7.6 percent of respondents. Most respondents owned at least one bicycle, and the majority did not own a car or motorcycle.

=== Project KaLakBay ===
In partnership with the Department of Transportation, the KaLakBay (Ka-Lakad at Baysikleta) Project conducted bicycle counts for 16 hours on April 22, 2022, and road-side route choice surveys on April 22 and 29, 2022, along several major roads in Metro Manila.

They counted 37,529 cyclists, at a 25:1 ratio of men to women. It was also observed that 61.9 percent were wearing helmets. Higher helmet usage was observed in cities with bicycle helmet laws, such as Quezon City and Valenzuela.

A total of 748 respondents were interviewed for the route choice surveys. Most respondents were also male (at a 15:1 ratio), most were at least high school and college graduates, and most were full-time employed. The majority of respondents had a personal monthly income of less than ₱20,000.

Survey respondents predominantly use bicycles for work and home errands. 46 percent of trips were under 30 minutes, and 37 percent were between 1 and 2 hours. Only a third of respondents began cycling during the pandemic, most of whom did not own a car or motorcycle and would take public transport when not using their bicycles. Most respondents also cycled for leisure at least once or twice a week. Over 90 percent of respondents stated that their workplaces had bicycle parking, while only 29 percent had workplaces with locker rooms, and 15 percent had workplaces with showers.

=== Social Weather Stations ===
Since 2020, the Social Weather Stations has conducted 13 surveys nationwide assessing the ownership and use of bicycles as a mode of transportation and as a recreational activity.

The latest survey, conducted from March 26 to 29, 2023, finds that 36 percent of households in the Philippines (around 10 million) use bicycles for any activity, up from 29 percent in April 2022. 24 percent of households (around 6.6 million) own bicycles, up from 23 percent in April 2022. Of the 36 percent of cycling households, 23 percent use their own bicycles, while 13 percent use borrowed bicycles. The number of people borrowing is up from 6 percent in April 2022.

Throughout the 13 surveys, more households consistently owned bicycles than four-wheeled motor vehicles, such as cars, vans, electric cars, jeepneys, or electric jeepneys, and three-wheeled motor vehicles, such as motorized and electric tricycles. However, more households owned two-wheeled motor vehicles such as motorcycles and electric bicycles.

Ownership	Percent of adults			Percent of households									
Ownership	May 2020	Jul 2020	Sept 2020	Nov 2020	May 2021	Jun 2021	Sept 2021	Dec 2021	Apr 2022	Jun 2022	Oct 2022	Dec 2022	Mar 2023
Bicycle	11%	14%	13%	8%	20%	14%	8%	12%	23%	15%	11%	9%	24%
Bicycle (with sidecar or pedicab)	2%	2%	2%	1%	1%	1%	1%	1%	2%	2%	1%	1%	1%
2-wheeled motor vehicles	31%	33%	32%	33%	36%	37%	40%	36%	37%	36%	39%	38%	41%
3-wheeled motor vehicles	13%	13%	13%	11%	10%	12%	9%	11%	10%	11%	10%	9%	11%
4-wheeled motor vehicles	6%	6%	5%	5%	5%	8%	7%	6%	6%	5%	4%	5%	6%

The March 2023 survey also revealed that among the 36 percent of households that use bicycles, 24 percent use them for essential activities, up from 21 percent in April 2022 and 19 percent in May 2021. On the other hand, 27 percent use them for recreational activities, up from 18 percent in April 2022 and 19 percent in May 2021.

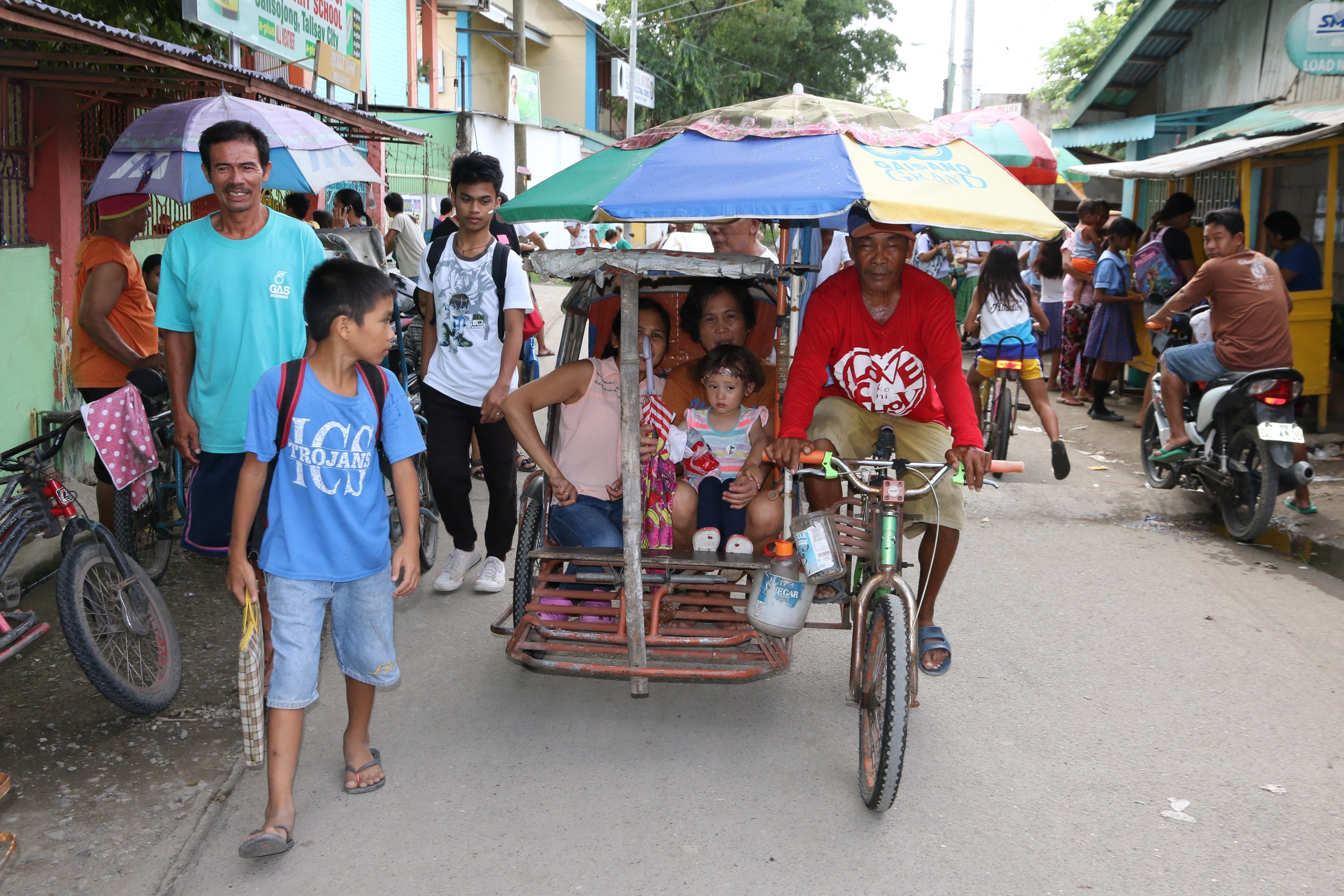
A cycle rickshaw taxi carries passengers along Labuca Street in Cansojong, Talisay, Cebu

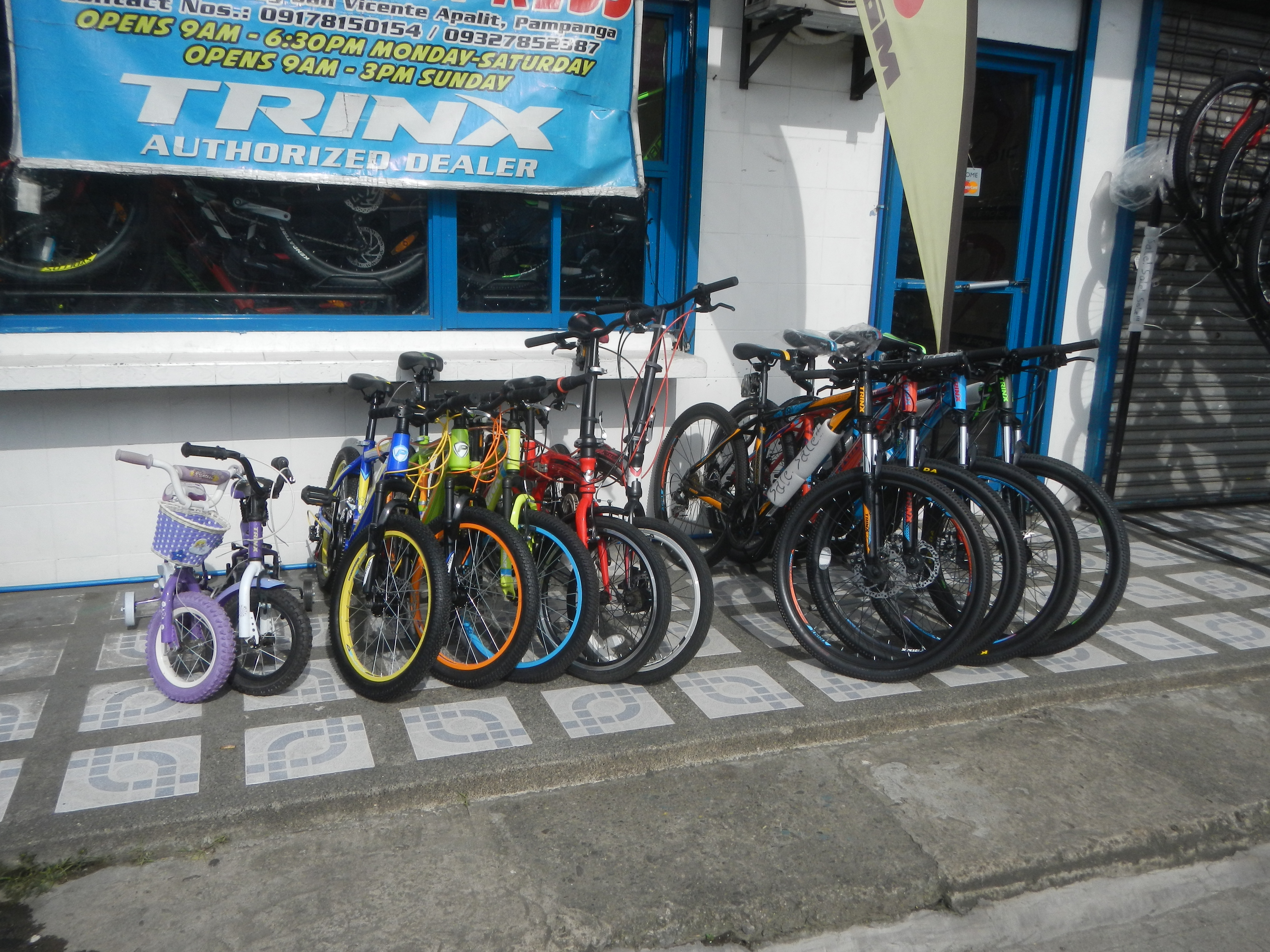
A bicycle store in Pulilan, Bulacan

Activity	Percent of households		
Activity	May 2021	Apr 2022	Mar 2023
Cycling households	24%	29%	36%
Uses a bicycle for essential activities	19%	21%	24%
Uses a bicycle for grocery or shopping trips	12%	15%	16%
Uses a bicycle for work commutes	6%	5%	7%
Uses a bicycle for non-work commutes	3%	5%	7%
Uses a bicycle as part of job or livelihood	4%	7%	4%
Uses a bicycle for recreational activities	19%	18%	27%
Uses a bicycle for exercise	6%	11%	17%
Uses a bicycle for sightseeing	4%	12%	17%
Uses a bicycle for other recreational activities	1%	0.2%	3%
Non-cycling households	76%	71%	64%

== Sport and recreation ==
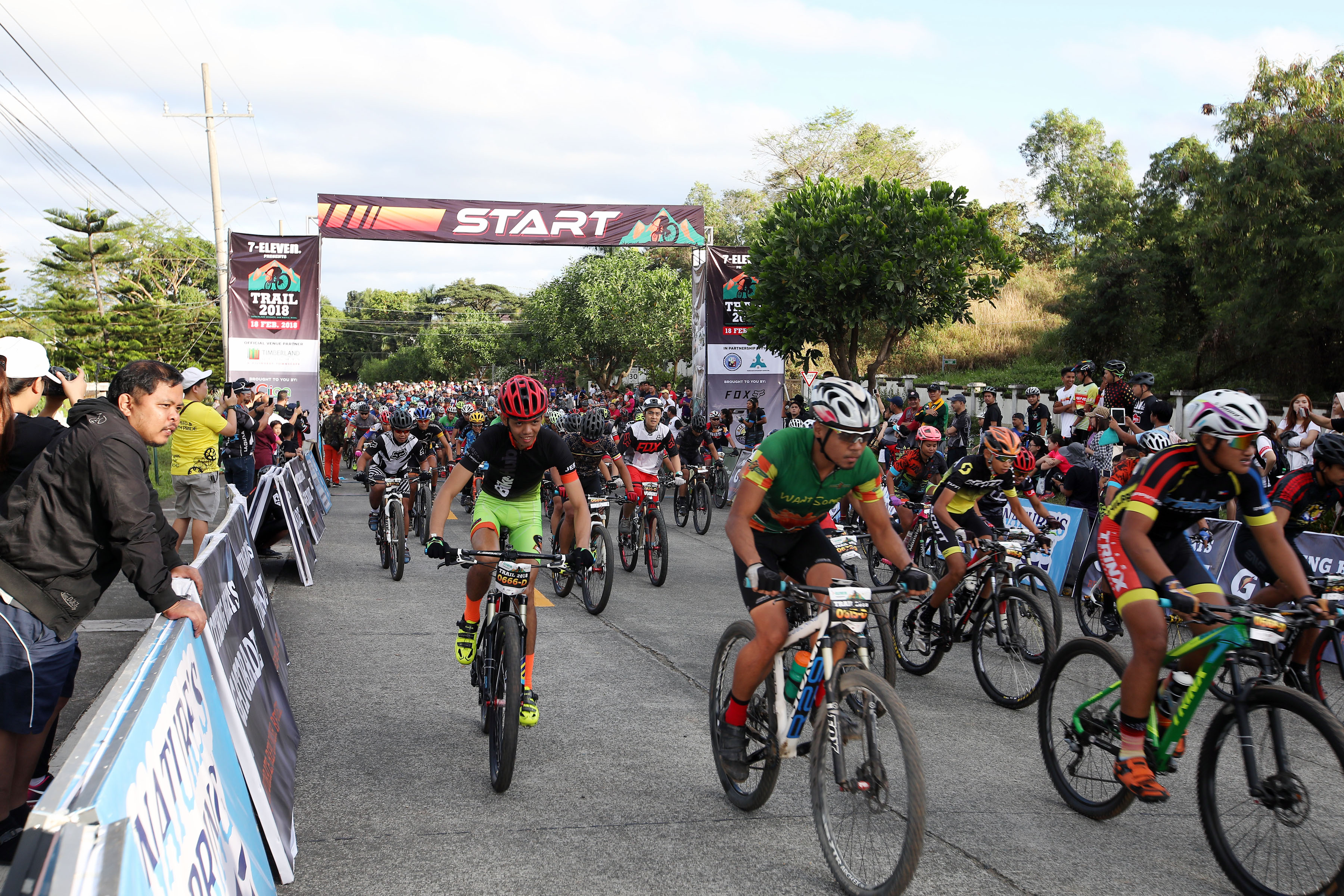
Cyclists at the 7-Eleven Trail mountain bike race in San Mateo, Rizal (2018)

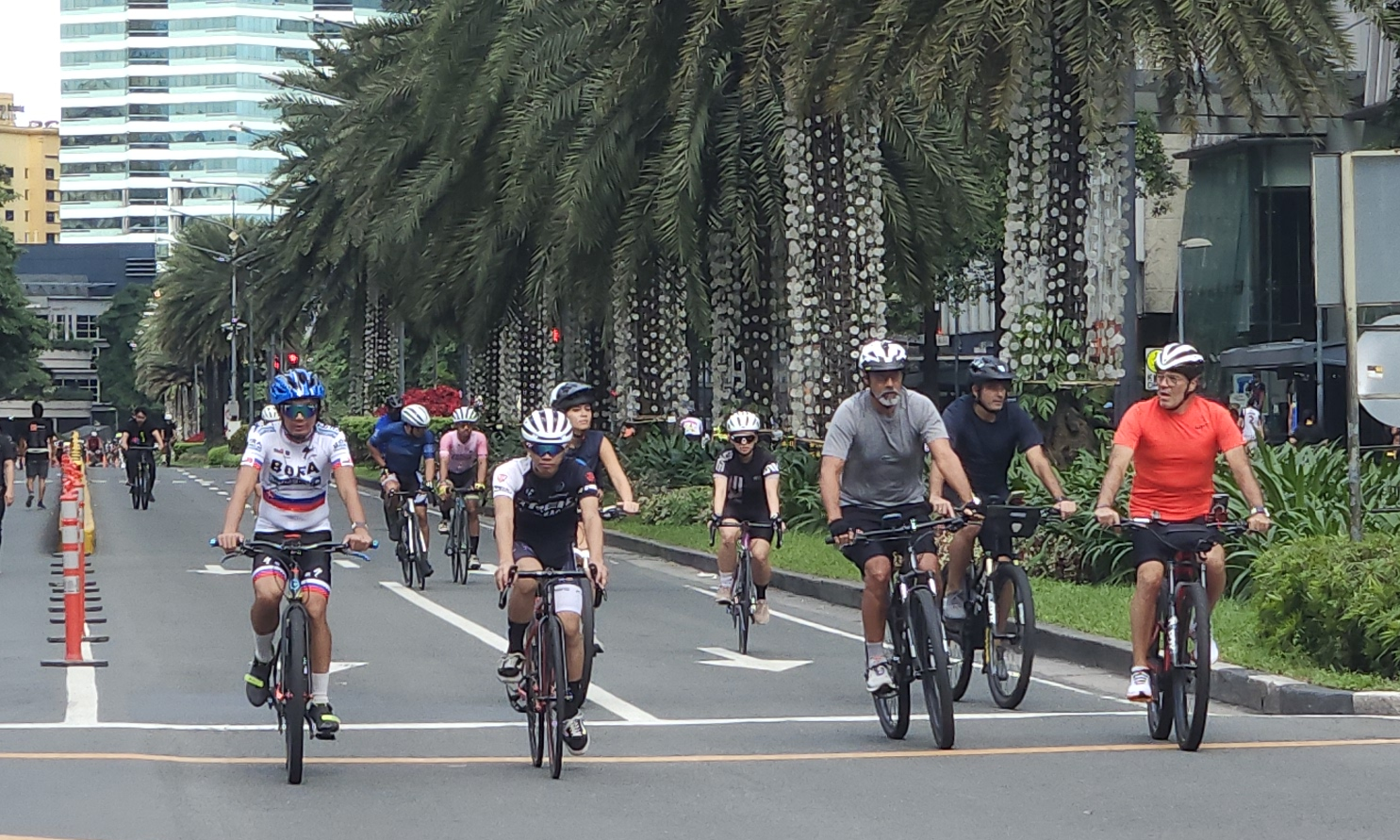
Recreational cycling at Car-Free Sundays at Ayala Avenue

In the Philippines, people cycle for sport at various levels. There are those who cycle as part of triathlon or other competitive events, those who cycle for tourism, those who cycle for exercise on weekends, and those who cycle around their neighborhoods.

There are several annual road cycling tours in the country, often spanning long distances such as from Manila to Baguio. These include Le Tour de Filipinas, Ronda Pilipinas, and PRUride Philippines.

In the 1990s, mountain biking grew in popularity as a recreational weekend activity, especially among Filipino yuppies. The province of Rizal is home to several popular mountain biking trails, particularly in its provincial capital of Antipolo. Other popular trail locations are in Tagaytay, Cavite, and Nuvali, a development in Calamba, Laguna.

In 2023, Ateneo de Manila Senior High School and De La Salle University – Dasmariñas Senior High School started offered elective cycling courses for physical education.

== Reception ==
Prior to the COVID-19 pandemic, the lack of attention to developing bicycle infrastructure in the Philippines had been a point of criticism for cyclists and mobility advocates clamoring for alternative modes of transportation. These individuals and groups cited high levels of traffic congestion and overcrowding on public transport as reasons to prioritize the development of cycling infrastructure.

When the Philippine government increased its focus on active transport infrastructure during the early stages of the COVID-19 pandemic, it was met with public support. Mobility advocacy groups called for stronger policies to support a sustainable and inclusive public transportation system and provided input on national guidelines for the proper use and promotion of active transport during and after the pandemic.

=== Backlash from motorists ===
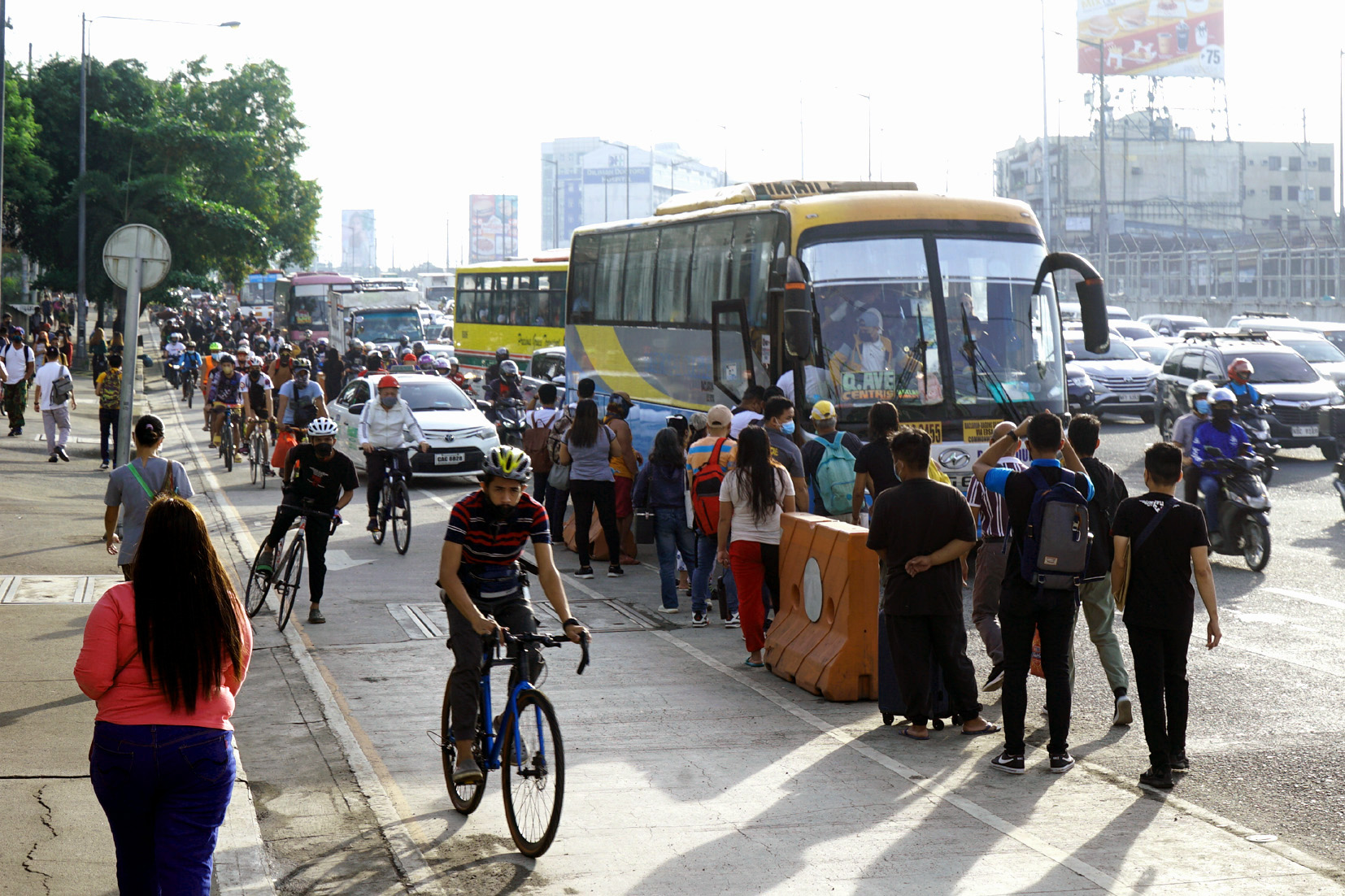
Cyclists on their exclusive lane along Commonwealth Avenue, Quezon City (2022)

The implementation of a national bicycle lane network in the Philippines has faced criticism from both motorists and cyclists. Some motorists argue that adding bicycle lanes on major roads has resulted in the removal of motor vehicle lanes, leading to increased traffic congestion and longer travel times. Cyclists have criticized the bicycle lane network's design and the government's apparent reluctance to prioritize bicycle and light electric vehicle infrastructure over motor vehicle infrastructure.

Concerns were also raised on the placement of bicycle lanes. Some lanes were overlaid onto existing road lanes rather than integrated as part of a reconfiguration of the road. This raised concerns about confusion among road users and an increased risk of accidents involving both cyclists and motorists.

In December 2022, motoring journalist James Deakin wrote a column in the Manila Bulletin calling the national government's bicycle lane network a "failed experiment" due to the "half lane" design and claimed the proliferation of motorcycles in the bicycle lanes was part of Filipinos' reluctance to consider cycling as a mode of transport. Deakin suggested that the bicycle lane should be "salvaged" into a motorcycle lane or removed completely to give "back to cars", which drew criticism. In response to Deakin's column, voice-over artist and content creator Inka Magnaye showed annoyance at the "bandaid solution" design of the bicycle lanes, and urged safety improvements. Her remarks were interpreted as a criticism of bicycle lanes, sparking discussions on road safety for drivers and cyclists alike.

=== Bicycle-related accidents ===
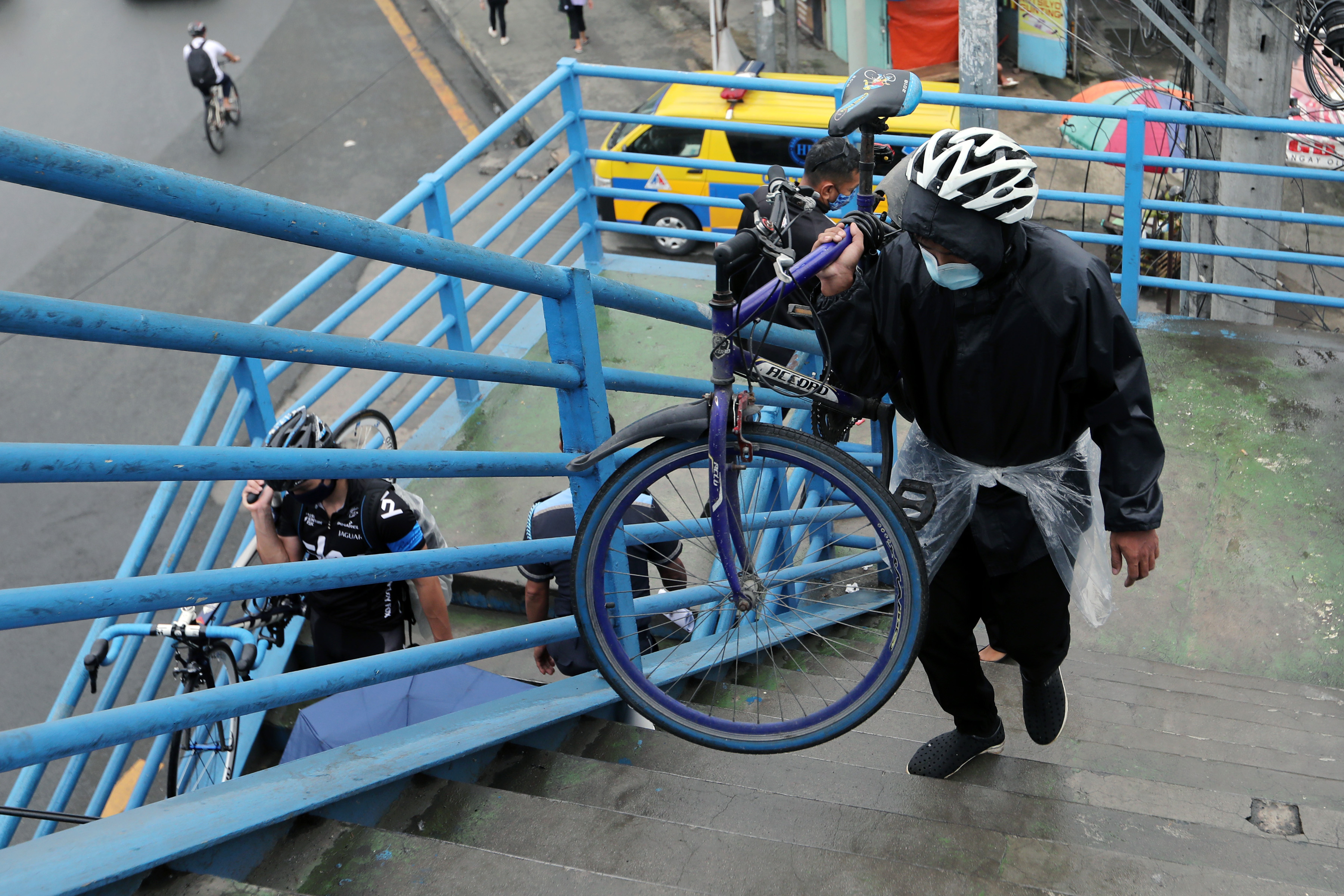
Cyclists carry their bikes on the Philcoa footbridge along Commonwealth Avenue in Quezon City (2020)

In 2020, with the growing popularity of cycling brought upon by the COVID-19 pandemic, the number of bicycle-related road accidents increased.

The Metropolitan Manila Development Authority (MMDA) reported a total of 1,759 accidents in 2019, along major roads within its jurisdiction, which increased to 2,503 accidents in 2020 and slightly decreased to 2,397 accidents in 2021. Most of these accidents were non-fatal, and a third were reported as damage to property. Notably, since 2020 MDMA data has also included road accidents involving pedicabs and electric bicycles. Many of these accidents have been attributed to a lack of protected bicycle lanes and traffic-calming measures to allow bicycles to safely navigate through heavily congested roads.

In a column in The Manila Times in June 2020, Manila mayor Isko Moreno expressed reluctance to comply with the national government's directive to put up bicycle lanes in Manila, stating that the city streets are too dangerous for cycling due to the presence of unruly motorists and "gargantuan" trucks. Cycling advocacy group Cycling Matters responded, criticizing him for complaining about the unsafe conditions for cyclists while not taking the "long overdue responsibility" to make Manila's roads safer for them.

=== Obstacles along bicycle lanes ===
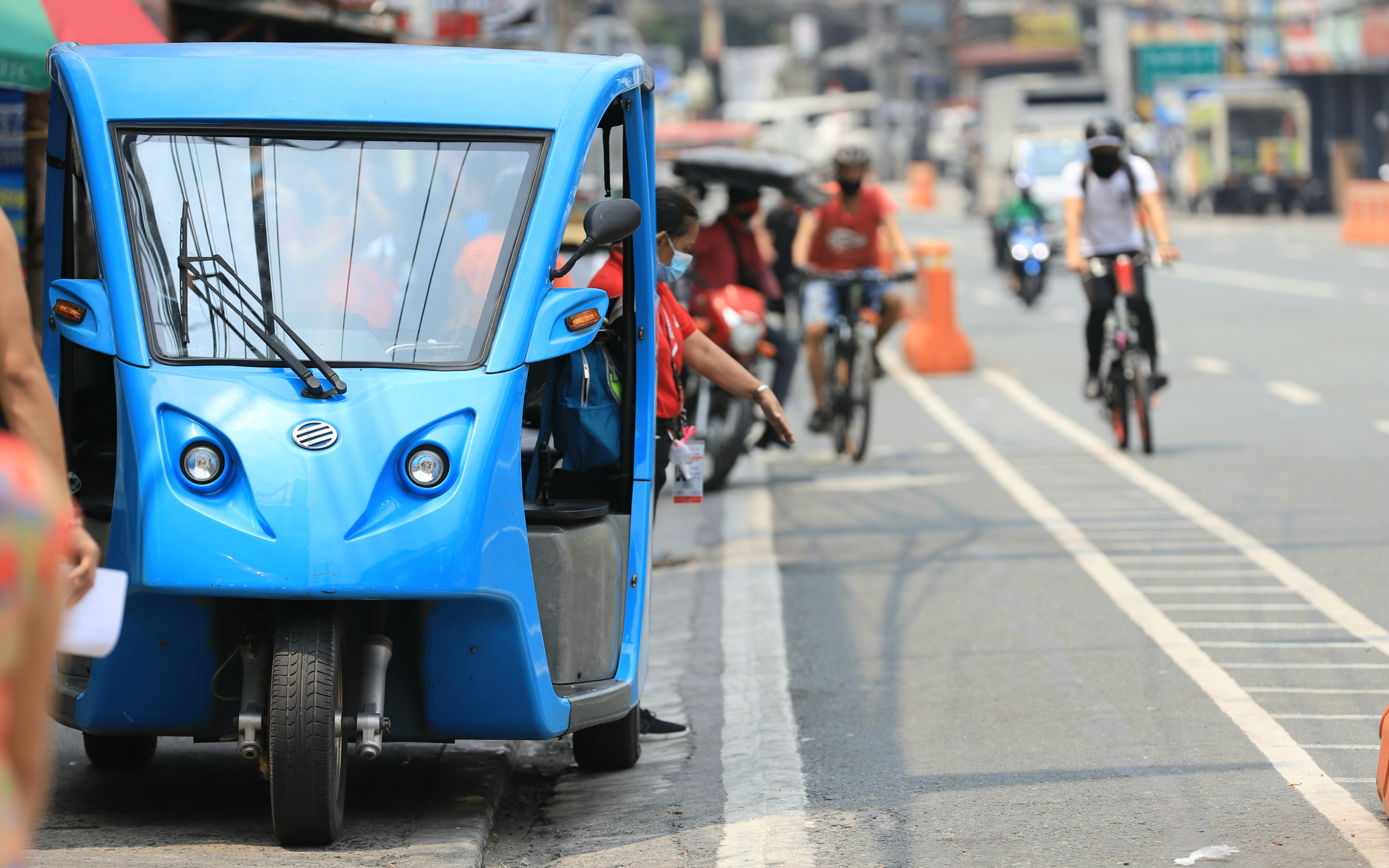
A Quezon City bike patroller watches over a bike lane along Roosevelt Avenue, Quezon City (2021)

Since the establishment of the nationwide bicycle lane network, motorists have complained that cyclists and other non-motorized transport users often leave or do not use the bicycle lanes, causing these users to go on open roads. However, many cyclists have expressed concerns with obstacles within the bicycle lanes, including potholes, puddles, metal sheets covering roadworks, dangerous drain covers, utility poles, and parked vehicles. Motor vehicles may sometimes enter unprotected segments of the bicycle lanes to turn or overtake. To avoid these obstacles, cyclists often go in and out of the bicycle lanes or avoid using them completely. Cycling advocates have also argued that bicycle lanes are not meant to "cage" cyclists into bicycle lanes but to keep motor vehicle users out of them.

== See also ==
- Sports in the Philippines
- Transportation in the Philippines
- Transportation in Metro Manila
- List of roads in Metro Manila
- Cycling advocacy
