= Light segregation =

Cycle lane safety infrastructure

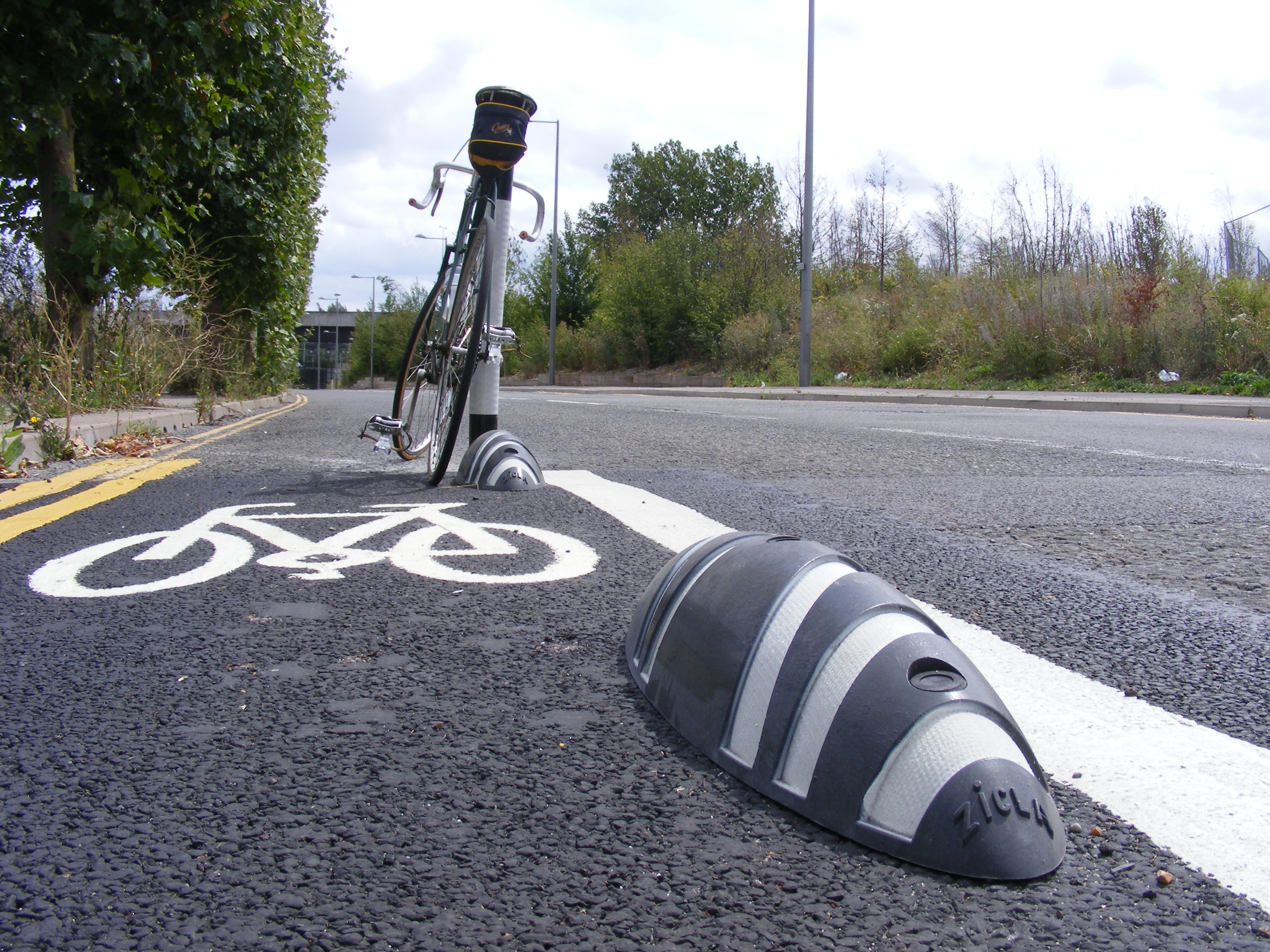
A cycle lane separated by Zicla-brand armadillo

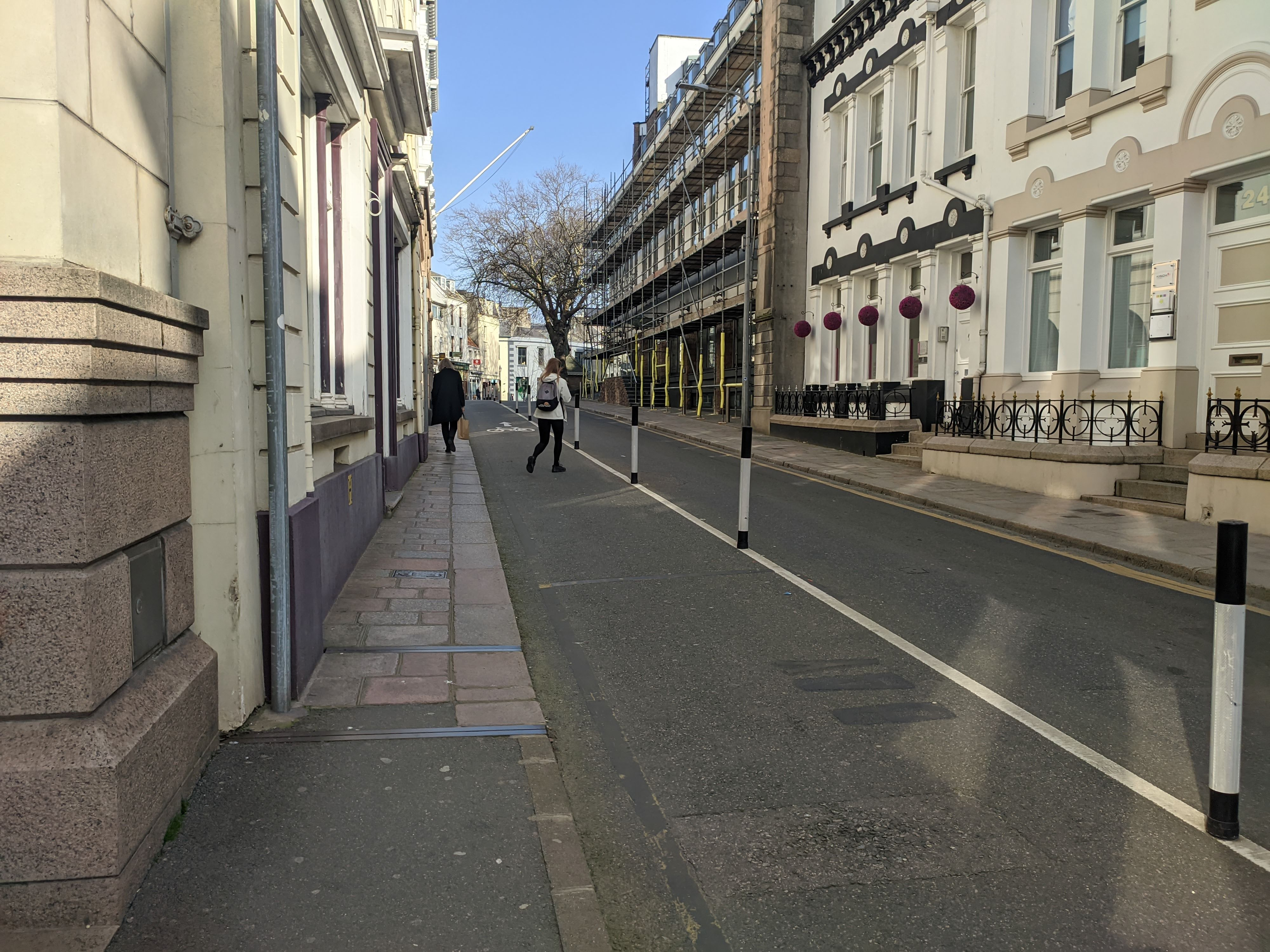
A wand-separated contraflow cycle lane in St Helier, Jersey

Light segregation or light protection is an engineering technique to protect cyclists using a cycle lane by placing physical objects next to the cycle lane that can be crossed by other traffic, but which makes crossing difficult or uncomfortable.

It first became a recognised treatment on the issue of the NACTO Urban Bikeway Design Guide in the United States in 2011, though it existed in different countries before then. They are intended to be a cheaper and easier-to-implement alternative to kerb protection. The estimated cost of kerb protection is £700,000/km, however the cost for light segregation is only around £60,000/km. Light segregation permitted Seville to implement a 80-kilometre (50-mile)-long cycle network in four years.

== Benefits ==
In Royal College Street, Camden, London, light segregation was introduced. The number of cyclists increased by 70% and the number of collisions reduced from 18 per 15 months to 3 per 15 months. Users feel safer on light-segregated cycle lanes than paint-only cycle lanes.

== Criticism ==
However, light segregation has been criticised for creating a trip hazard for pedestrians and a collision risk for cyclists. Objects in the carriageway may also be struck by a vehicle, which might also harm vulnerable road users. Light segregated lanes when badly designed can compromise accessibility for disabled people, prevent access to the kerbside for motor vehicles (e.g. to let passengers out of the vehicle). Another issue are bus stops. Light segregation would require buses to stop away from the kerb (for example in a bus bulb) or in the cycle lane. The solution – bus stop boarders – put cyclists and boarding/deboarding passengers into direct conflict with one another. Bus stop bypasses cannot be achieved through light segregation, but can be tied into light segregation schemes.

== Products ==
Different products which can be used for light segregation are:

- Flowerpots or other planters
- Bollards or flexible posts
- Various products under brand names such as Armadillos, Lacasitos, Orcas, Wandorcas
