= Bicycle transportation planning and engineering =

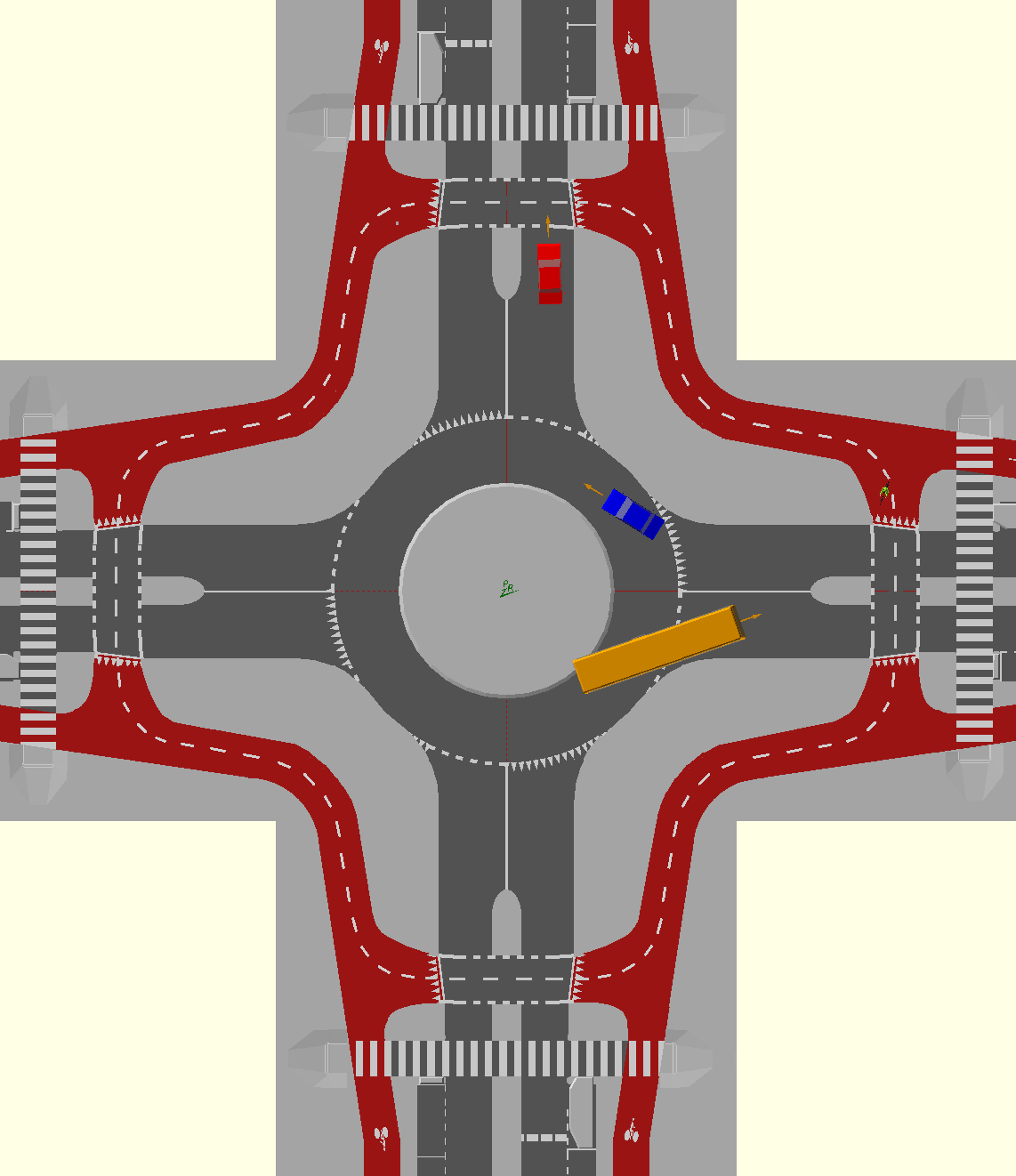
Dutch-style roundabout, a type of protected intersection

Bicycle transportation planning and engineering are the disciplines related to transportation engineering and transportation planning concerning bicycles as a mode of transport and the concomitant study, design and implementation of cycling infrastructure. They include the study and design of dedicated transport facilities for cyclists (e.g. cyclist-only paths) as well as mixed-mode environments (i.e. where cyclists share roads and paths with vehicular and foot traffic) and how both of these examples can be made to work safely.

In addition to designing individual facilities, bicycle transportation planning encompasses network planning, integration with public transport, project evaluation, public participation, and analysis of how the benefits and burdens of cycling policies are distributed among different population groups.

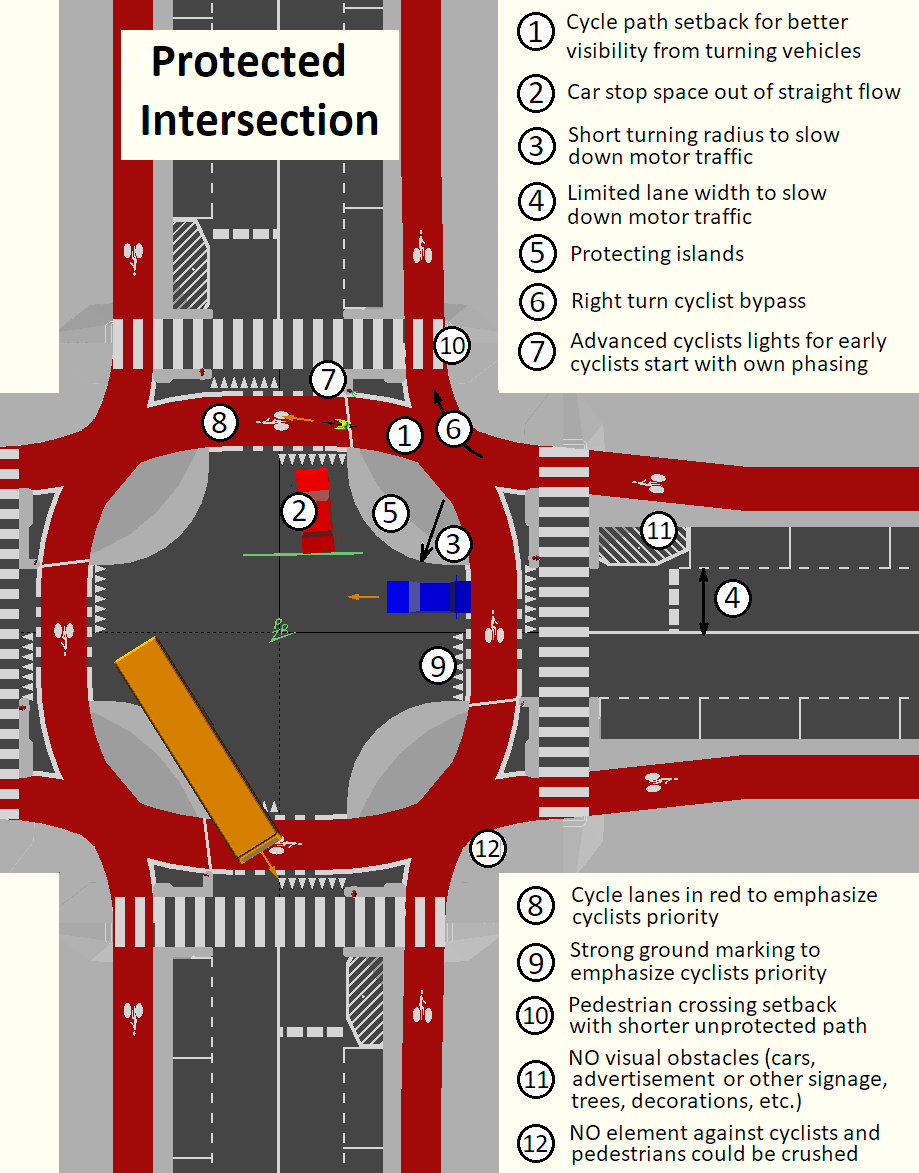
A protected intersection in Dutch cycling planning

In jurisdictions such as the United States it is often practiced in conjunction with planning for pedestrians as a part of active transportation planning. Some bicycle planning was criticised for favouring car based travel connections rather than connections used by non car users.

== Networks, signage and maps ==
Most national cycling route networks have long-distance named routes, rather like highways. However, the international numbered-node cycle network has a modular design that enables arbitrary routes using simple signage. Both aim to minimize map use with plentiful signs.

Cycle networks of routes can be developed in co-ordination with cycle maps. Co-ordination can be local or national (the numbered-node cycle network has national co-ordination in some countries, and local co-ordination in others).

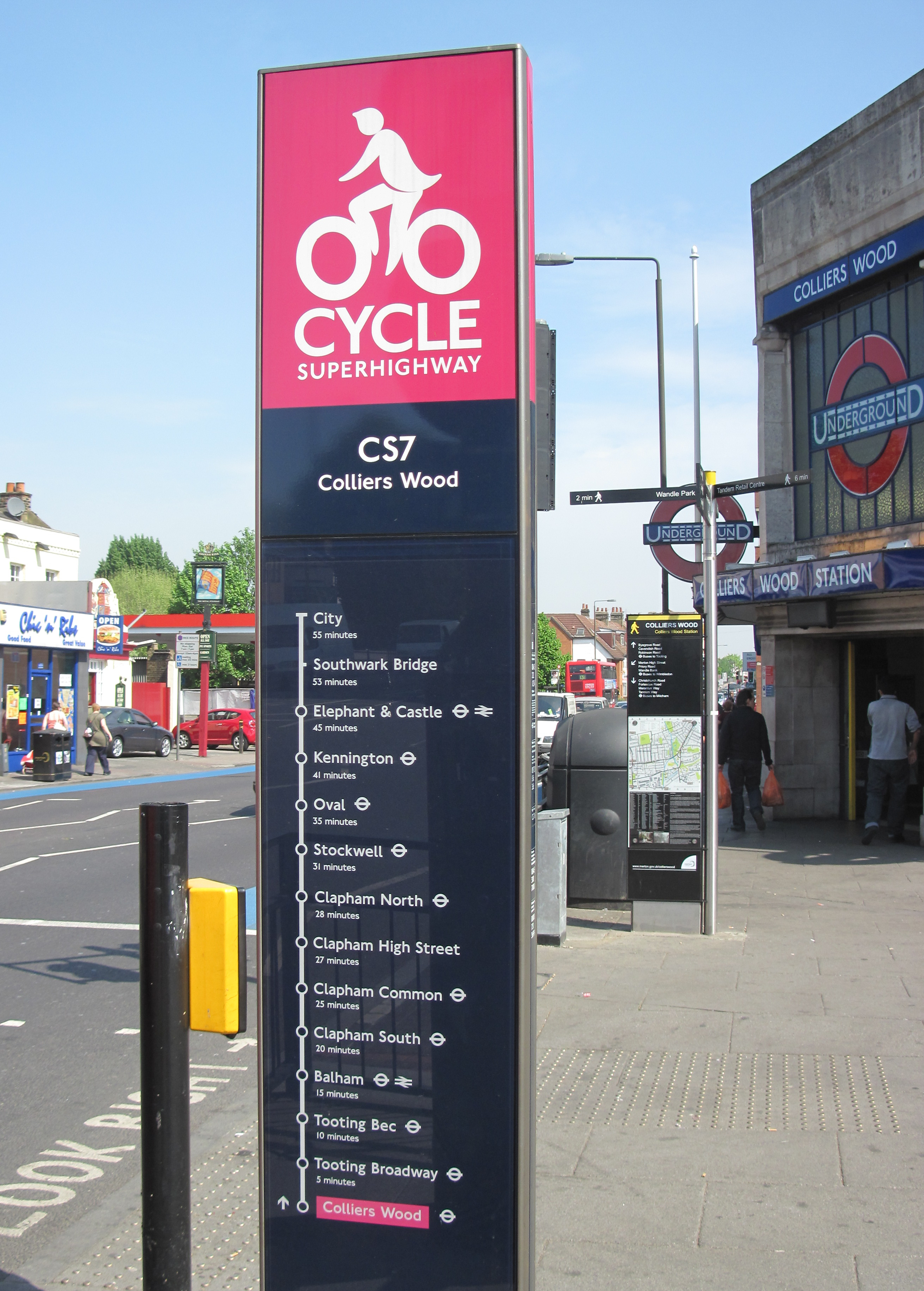
Cycle Superhighway CS7 start point at Colliers Wood Underground Station]

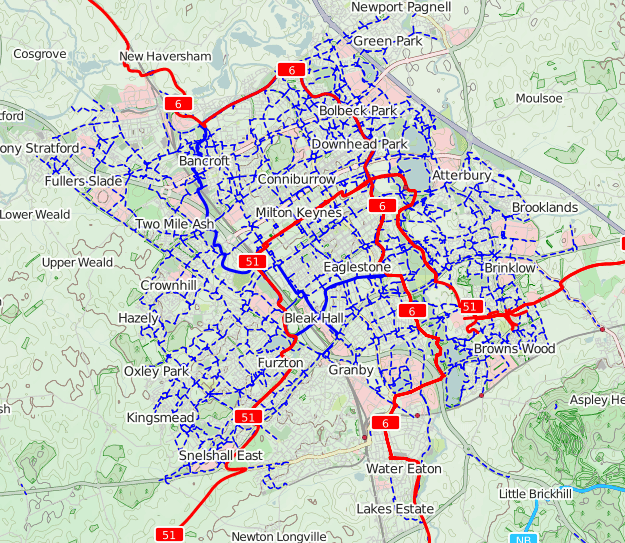
Cycleway network in Milton Keynes. NCR routes 6 and 51 are highlighted in red. In 1970 in the United Kingdom, the Milton Keynes Development Corporation produced the "Master Plan for Milton Keynes".

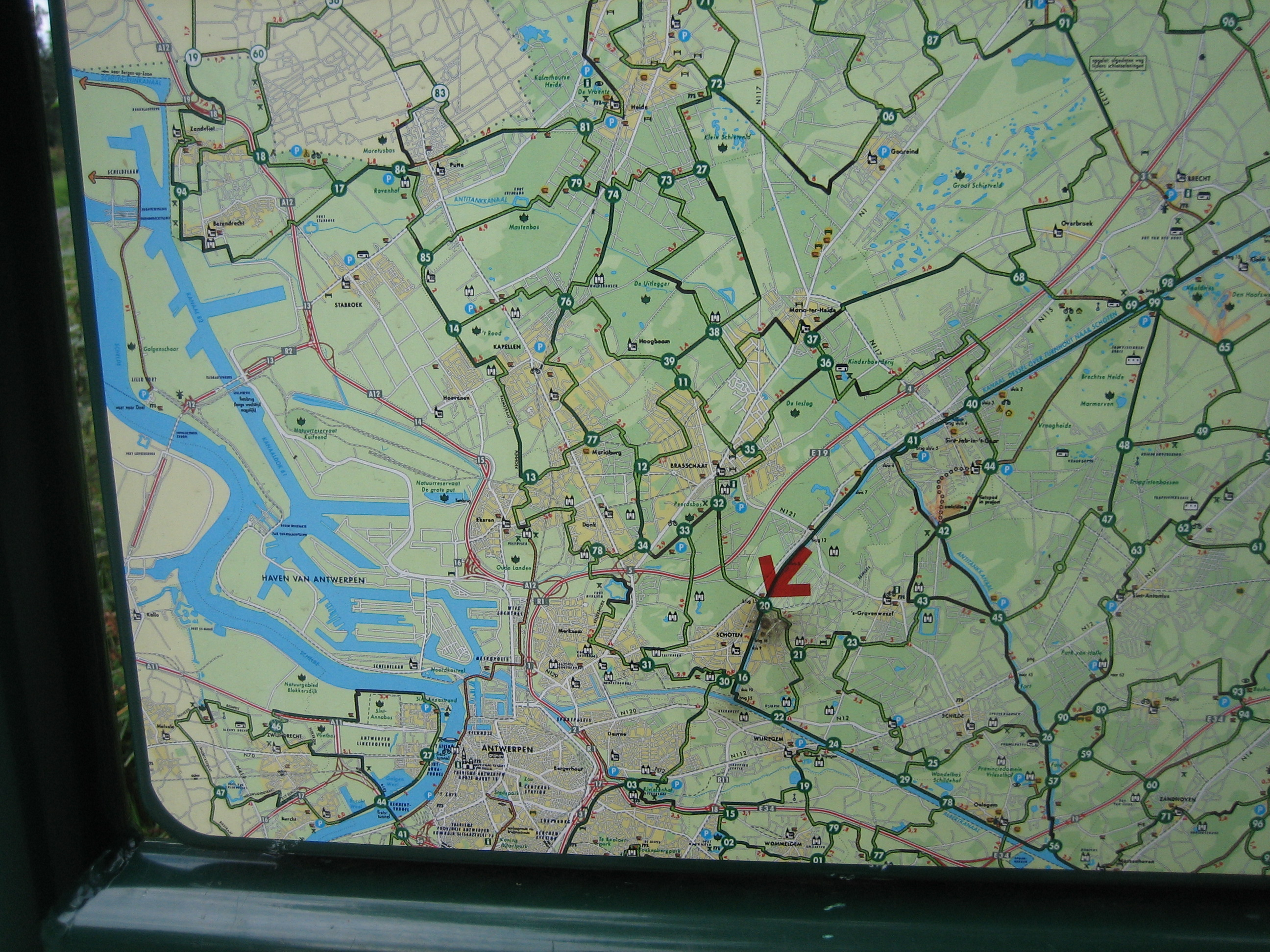
A locator map on the numbered-node cycle network, at node 20 in Schoten, near Antwerp. Each intersection is marked with a numbered circle; any route through the network can be represented as a string of numbers.

== Bikeways ==
Some examples of the types of bikeways under the purview of bicycle transportation engineers include partially segregated infrastructure in-road such as bike lanes, buffered bike lanes; physically segregated in-road such as cycle tracks; bike paths with their own right-of-way; and shared facilities such as bicycle boulevards, shared lane markings, advisory bike lane, road shoulders, wide outside lanes, shared street schemes, and any roadways with legal access for cycling.

=== In roadway ===
NACTO guidelines state "desired width for a cycle track should be 5 feet (1.5 m). In areas with high bicyclist volumes or uphill sections, the desired width should be 7 feet (2.1 m)". CROW standard width for one way cycle paths in the Netherlands is a minimum of 2.5 m (8′). For bidirectional use the minimum is 3.5 m (11′).

==== Unsegregated ====
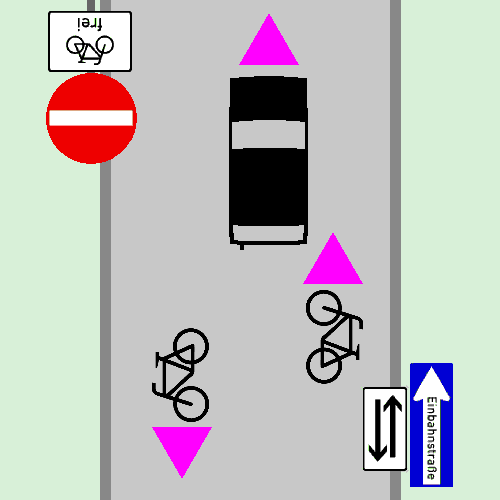
One-way street with two-way shared cycling

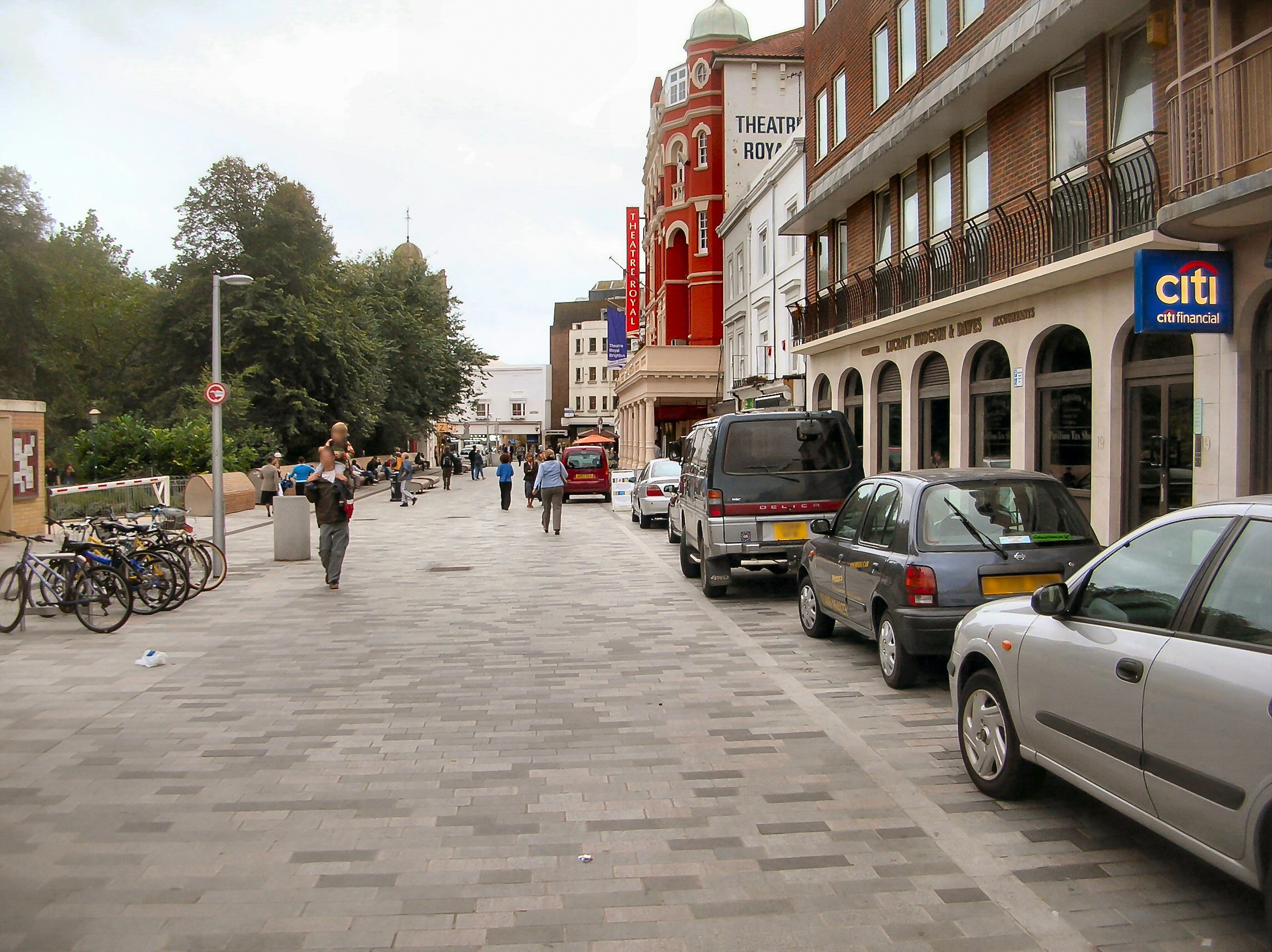
Streetscape in which all modes of travel (pedestrians, cyclists, and motorists) share the road

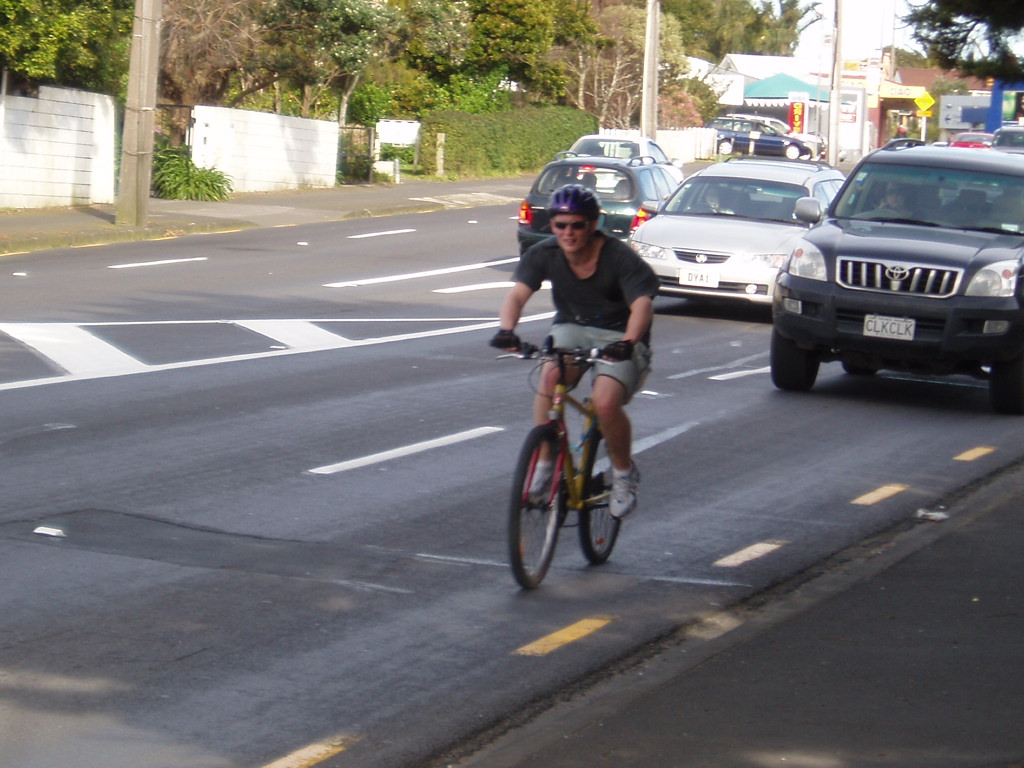
Streetscape in which cyclists and motorists share the road
- Bicycle boulevard
- Shared bus and cycle lane

==== Partially segregated ====
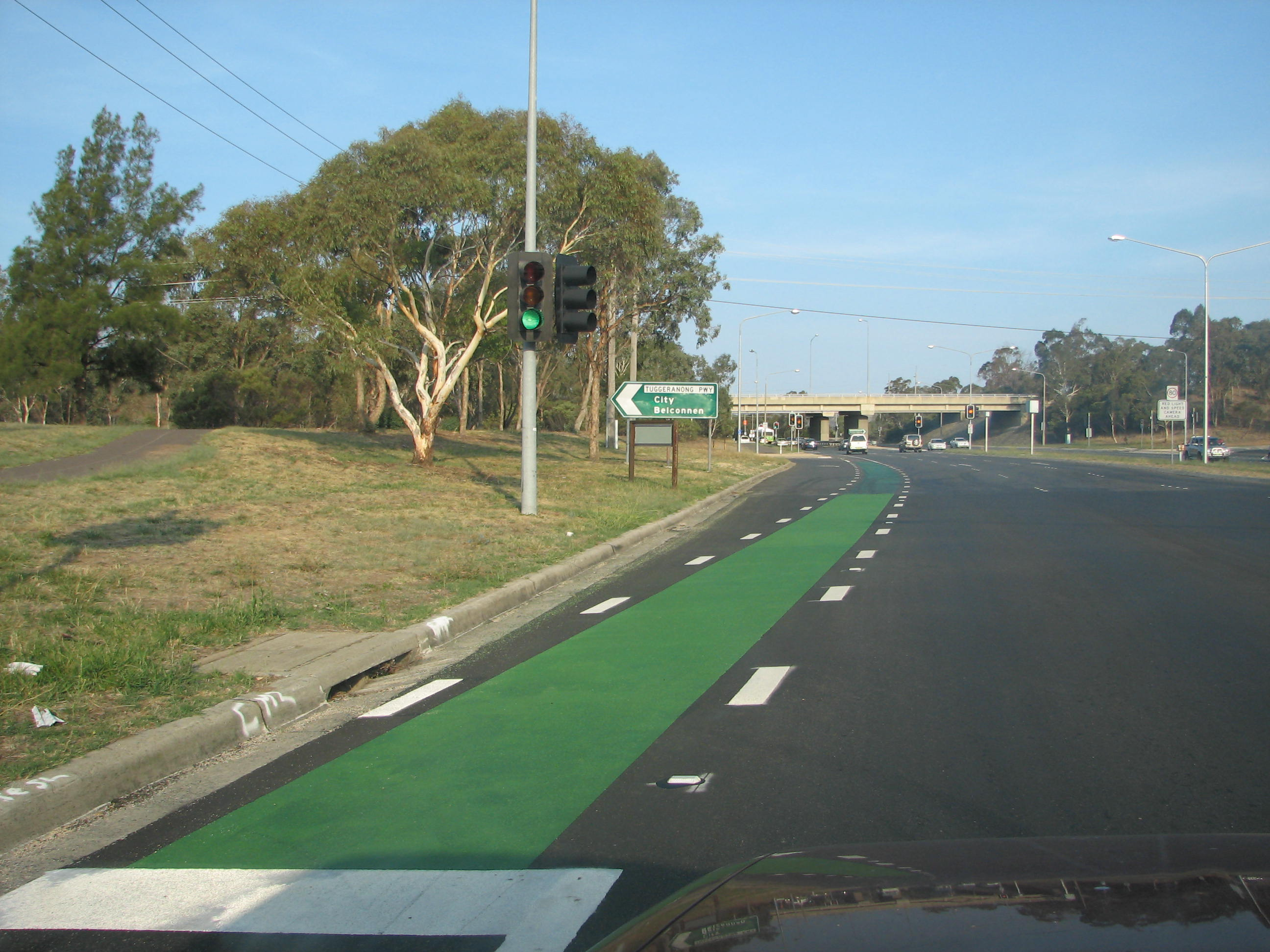
Streetscape with dedicated cycle facilities next to other traffic
- Cycle lane
- Shared lane marking

==== Segregated ====
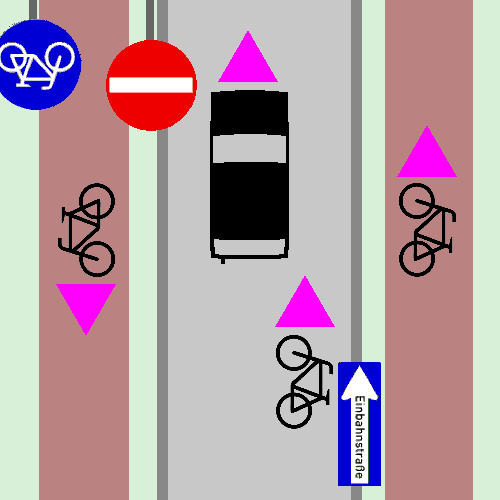
One way street with two way cycle tracks and shared road

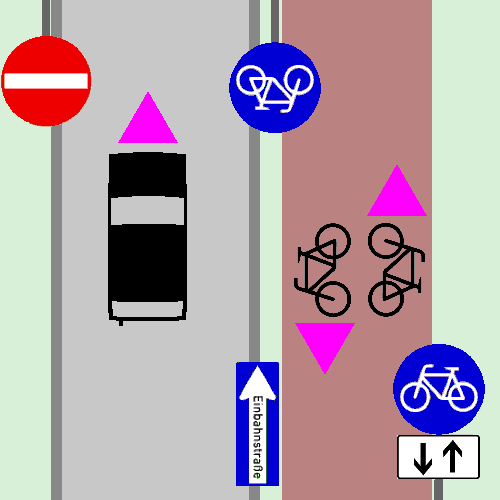
One way street with a single two way cycle track on right

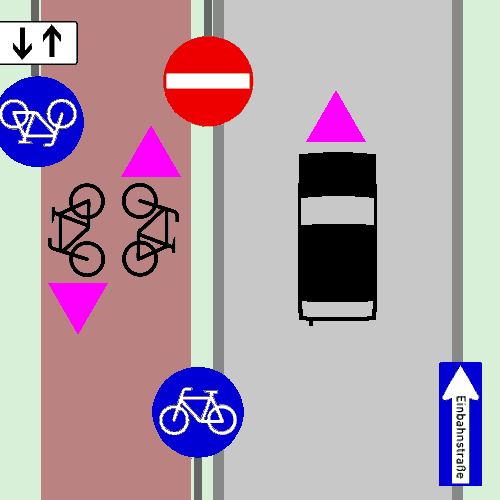
One way street with a single two way cycle track on left

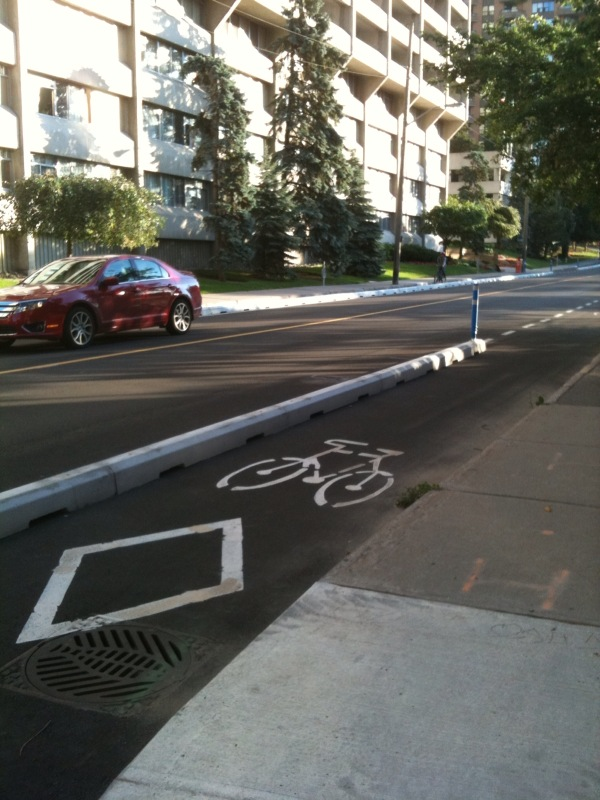
Cycle tracks with concrete barriers in downtown Ottawa, Ontario, Canada on Laurier Avenue in 2011.

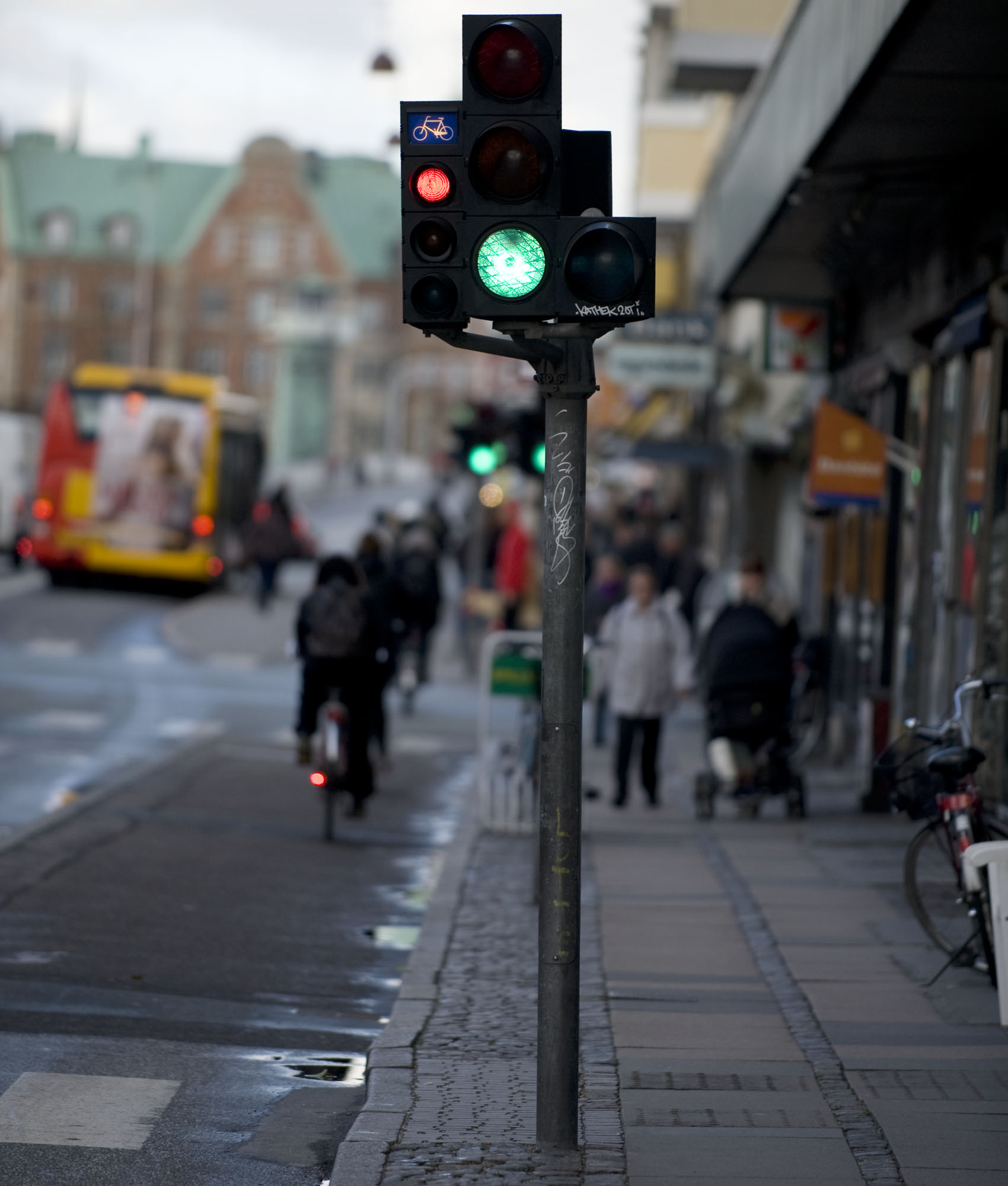
Separate traffic light for automobiles and bicycles on cycle track in Denmark

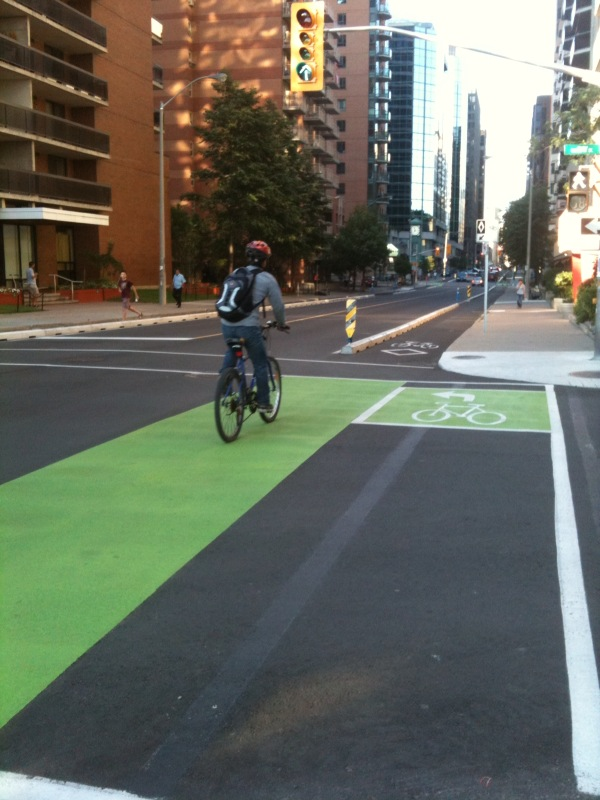
Cycle track with green lanes through intersection in Ottawa, Ontario, Canada (also on Laurier) in 2011.
- Cycle track

===== Barriers =====
Options for barriers are soft-hit posts, raised curb or traffic barriers.

=== Off road ===
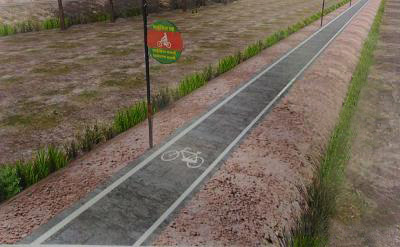
207 km (129 mi) long cycle highway between Etawah and Agra in India

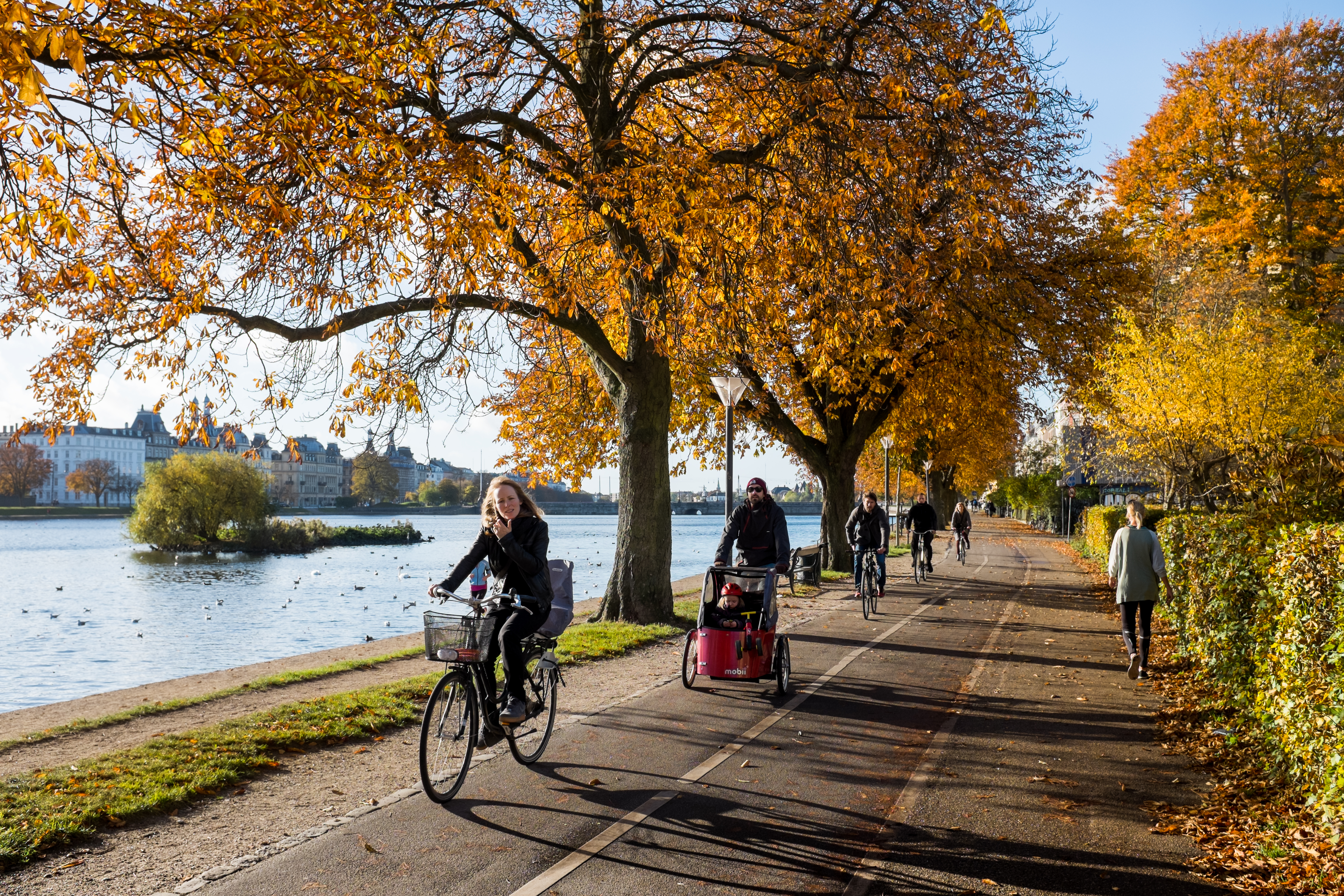
Copenhagen, Denmark
- Bike path
- Rail trail

=== Bike freeway ===
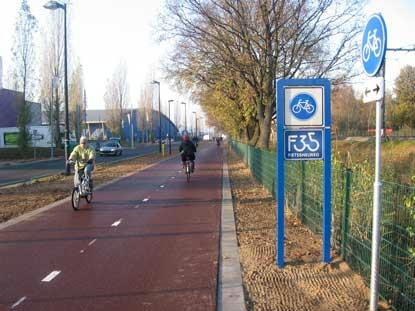
The bicycle highway F35 in Enschede.
- Bike freeway

== Integration with public transportation ==
Bicycles can be used for the access leg between a journey origin and a public-transport stop, for the egress leg between a stop and the final destination, or for both. This combination is commonly known as bike-and-ride. Cycling can increase the practical catchment area of public-transport stops and may reduce door-to-door journey times compared with walking or using a connecting service.

== Intersections and signals ==
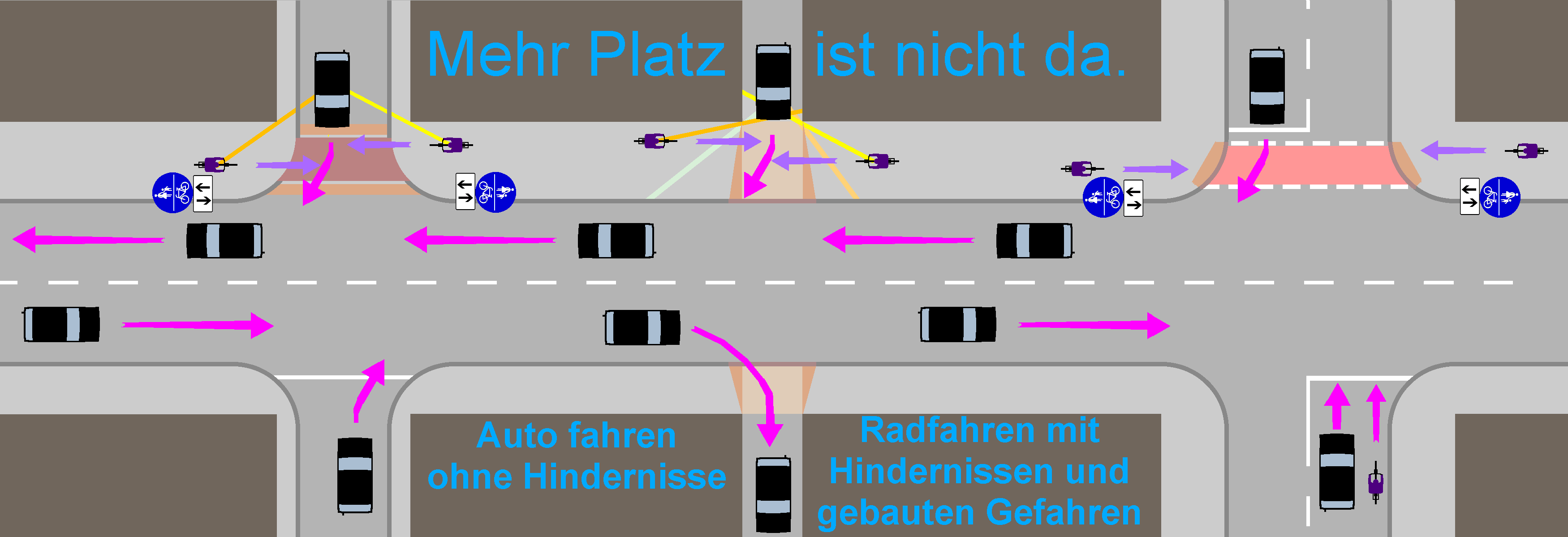
Separation without sufficient space worsens conditions for cycling

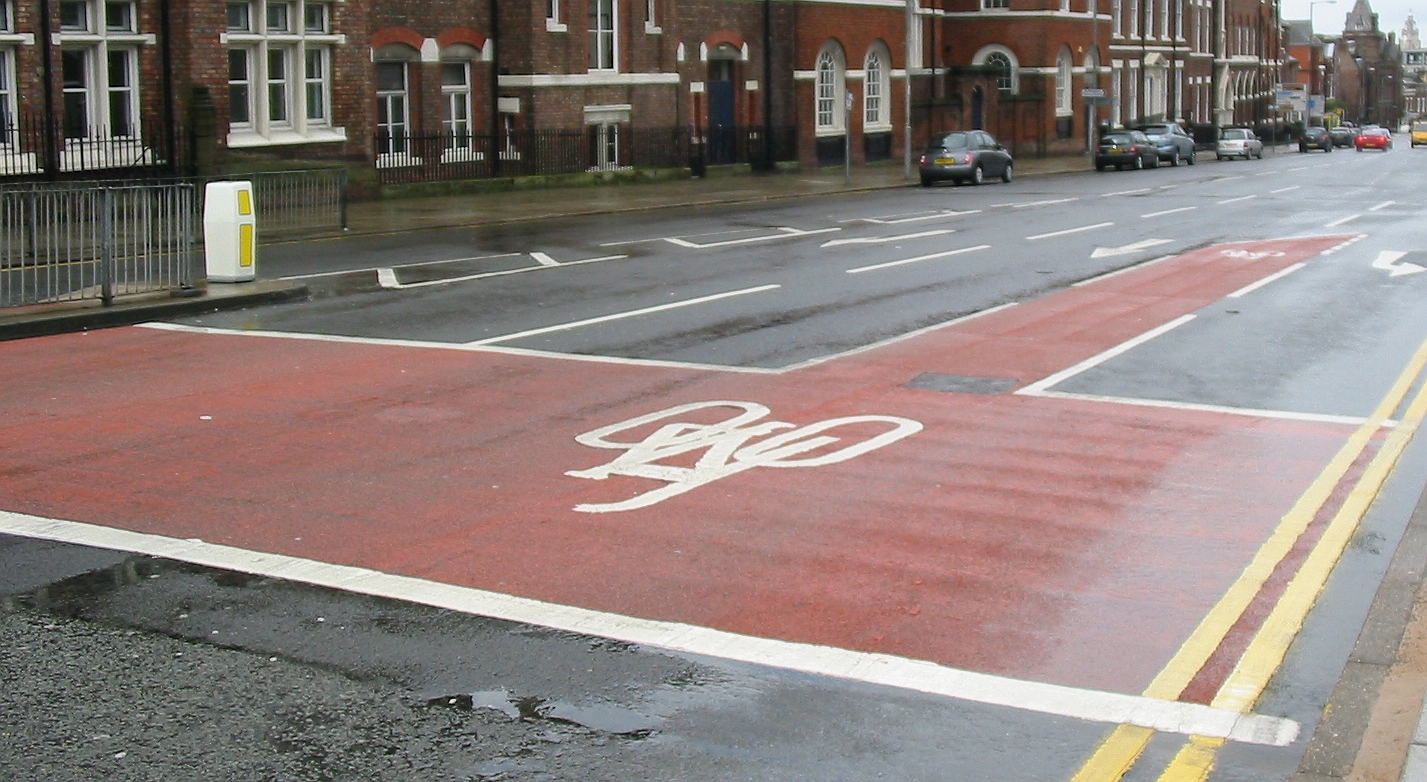
Advanced stop line, Liverpool, UK

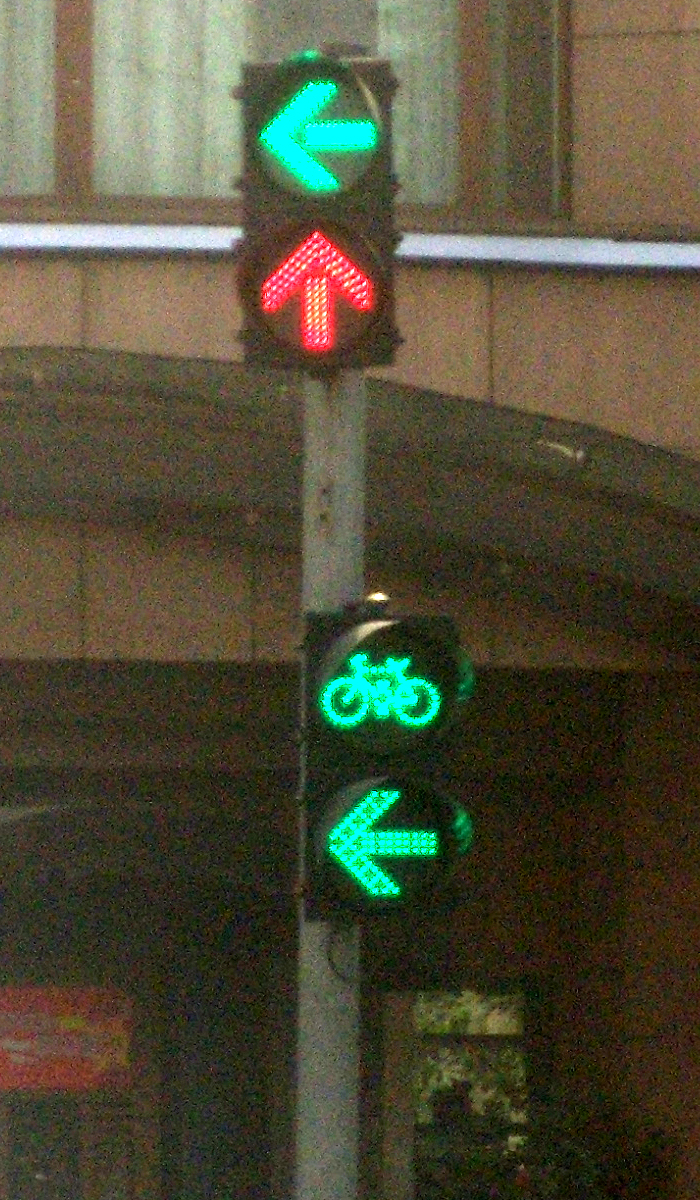
Signals for cyclists in China

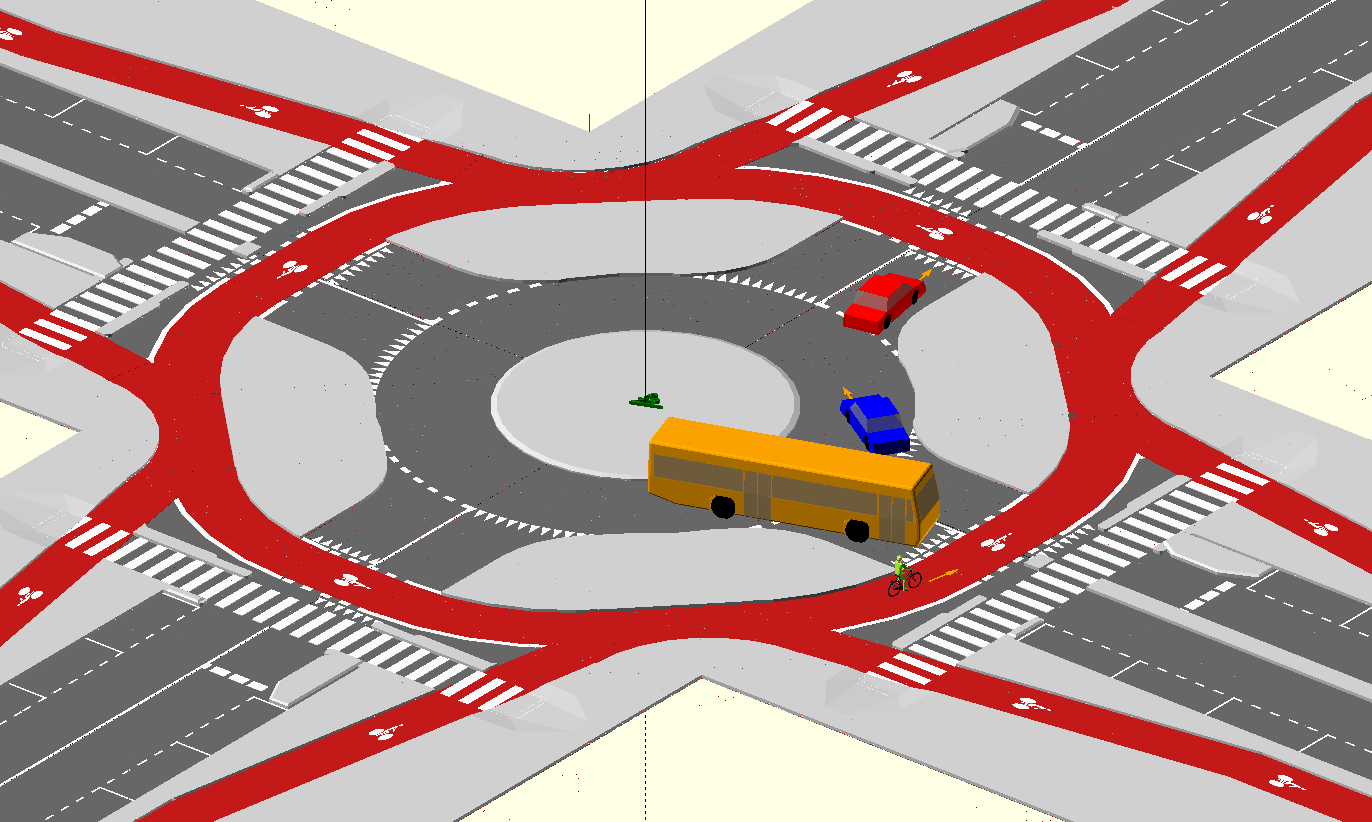
Protected intersection

Bicycle transportation engineers also are involved in improving intersections/junctions and traffic lights. Advanced stop lines are one example of road markings on mixed mode shared space as cycling infrastructure.

== Other infrastructure ==
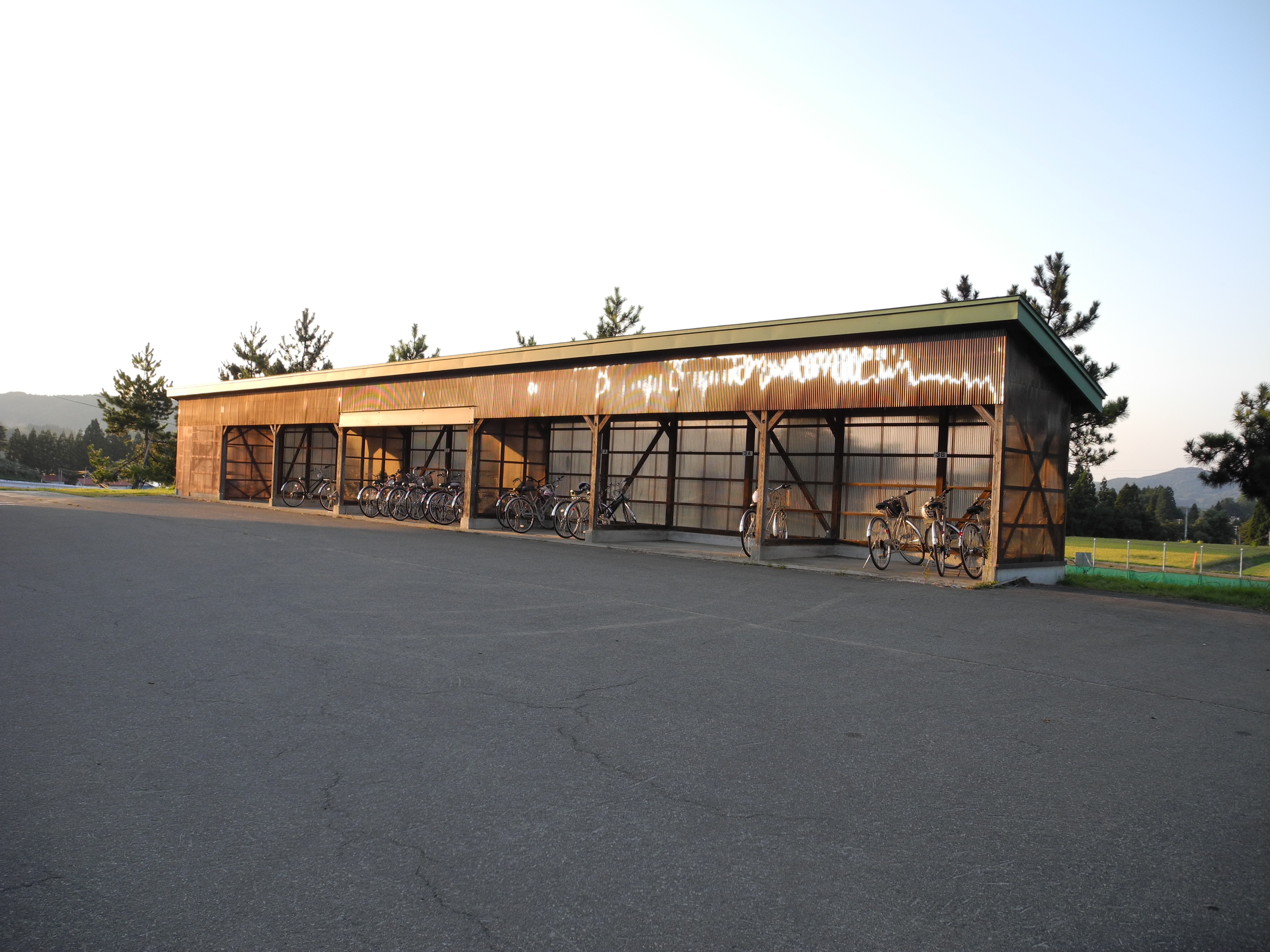
Bicycle parking

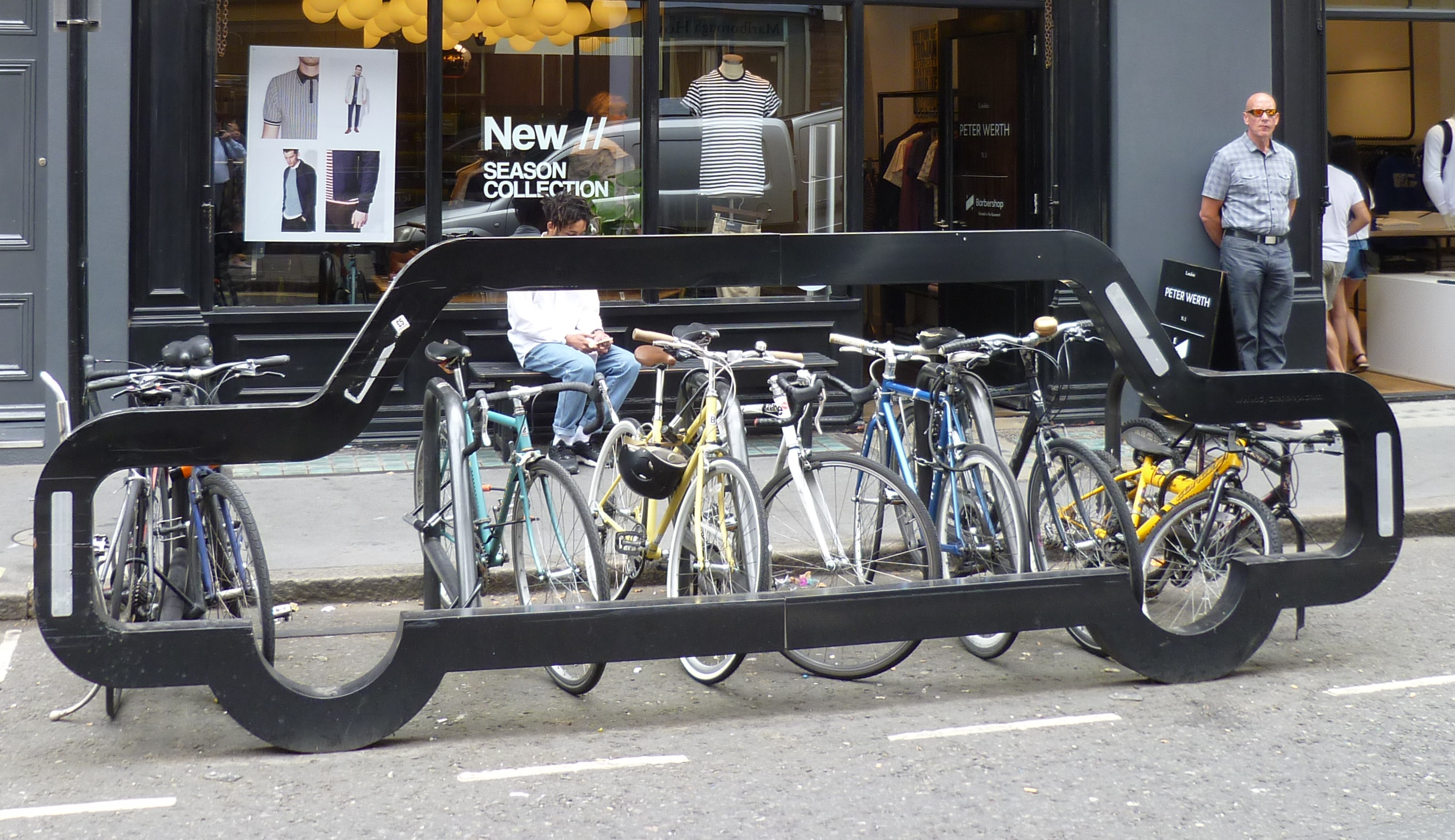
Bike rack shaped like a car

Road diets, curb extension, improving the road surface; building bicycle parking such as bicycle locks, bicycle stands, lockers. Measures used to support bike-and-ride include safe cycling routes to stops, conveniently located bicycle parking, secure bicycle parking at major stations, and short-term bicycle rental at destination stations. Cycling infrastructure in public transit hubs, train stations and bus stops was found to increase the volume of passengers using the public transit options according to a 2004 study by Dutch transport planner, Karel Martens. Dutch evaluations in Martens' study reported that improvements to bicycle parking at railway stations were followed by increased user satisfaction and growth in the number of bicycles parked at stations. Programs at bus stops produced more varied results, partly because bus stops generally have smaller catchment areas and lower passenger volumes than major railway stations.

== Legislation ==
in California new bikeway design standards were last adopted in 1976. Those designs were adapted by the Association of American State Highway and Transportation Officials (AASHTO) to become the AASHTO Guide for Bicycle Facilities, which is followed in the USA.

== Criticism ==
In 2007 Karel Martens and Aaron Golub criticised the investment priorities in cycling projects. They argued that investment based primarily on congestion relief or peak-period commuting favours routes to major employment centres over connections needed by car-free households or people making local and off-peak journeys. Martens and Golub suggested equity analysis which can supplement aggregate counts by examining the geographic and demographic distribution of various factors including: facilities, hazards, and the accessibility of destinations. It was also suggested to consult with the public and to specifically consult communities known to be underrepresented in existing data.

== See also ==
- Bikeway controversies
- Bicycle Master Plan
- Bikeway safety
- Cyclability
- CROW Design Manual for Bicycle Traffic
- Bicycle mobility
- Sustainable transport
- Outline of cycling
- Cycling infrastructure
- Mikael Colville-Andersen
