= CROW Design Manual for Bicycle Traffic =

Design manual for bicycle traffic

- Original title: Ontwerpwijzer fietsverkeer
- Language: English
- Subject: Bicycle transportation planning and engineering
- Publisher: CROW
- Publication place: Netherlands
- English publication date: 2016
- Media type: Print
- Pages: 300
- ISBN: 9789066286597
- OCLC: 985651960
- Website: https://crowplatform.com/product/design-manual-for-bicycle-traffic/

CROW Design Manual for Bicycle Traffic is a publication on bicycle transportation planning and engineering in the Netherlands. It is published by CROW, a non-profit agency that advises Rijkswaterstaat and the Ministry of Infrastructure and Water Management. It is the most influential bicycle traffic planning manual, both worldwide and on cycling in the Netherlands. It was last updated in 2016. It is considered best practice in the Netherlands.

== History ==
First published in the 1970s, it was most recently revised and published including in English, in 2016.

CROW was originally an acronym devised in 1987 that stood for Centrum voor Regelgeving en Onderzoek in de Grond-, Water- en Wegenbouw en de Verkeerstechniek (Centre for Regulation and Research in Earthworks, Hydraulic Engineering and Road Construction and Traffic Engineering). The name CROW is still used even though the centre it was named after no longer exists in its 1987 form.

== See also ==
- Bikeway controversies
- Bikeway safety
- National Association of City Transportation Officials § Urban Bikeway Design Guide
