= Cycle track =

Cycleway between a road and sidewalk, protected by barriers

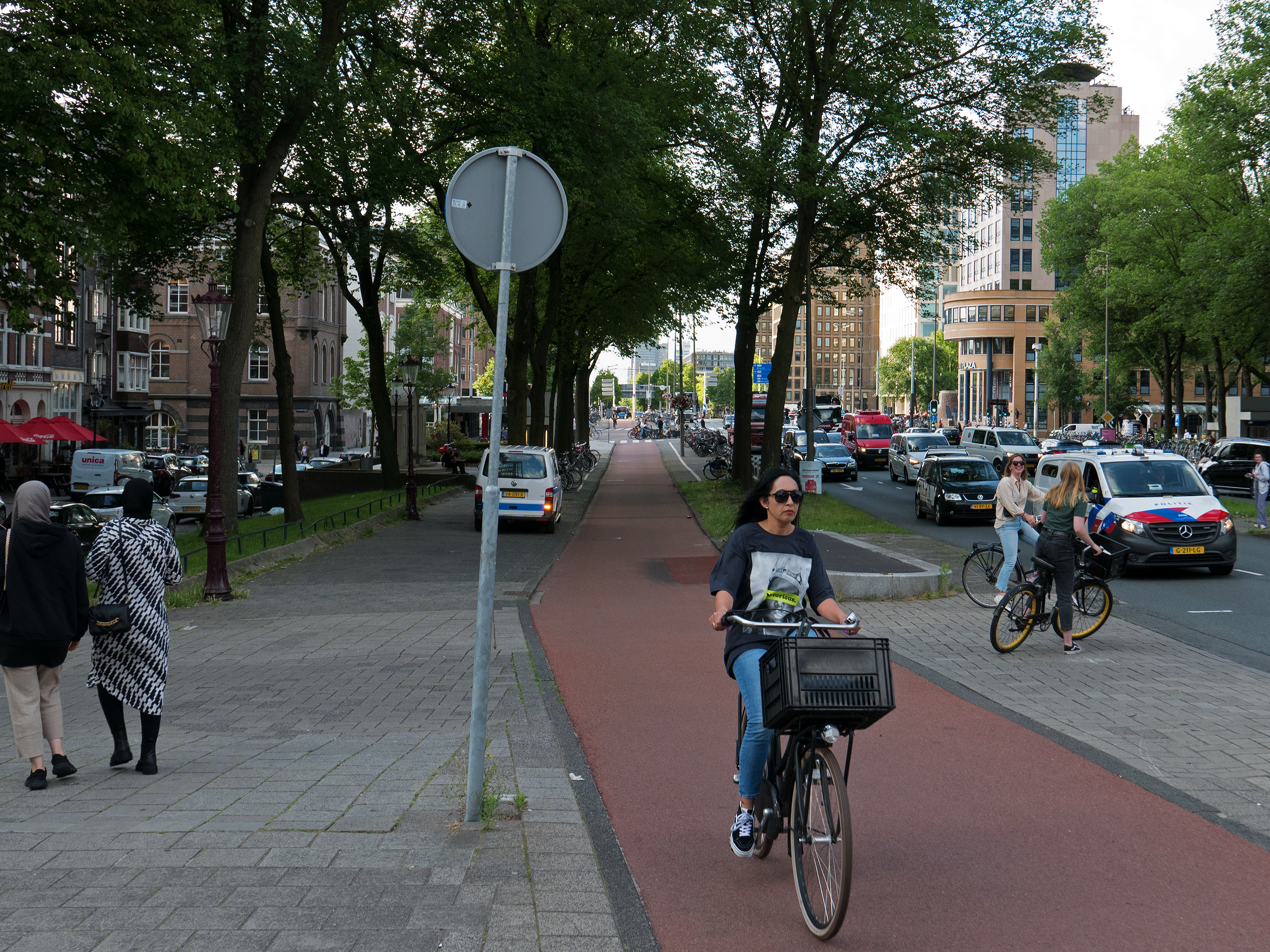
A cycle path in Amsterdam. The Dutch are well known for having an extensive network of cycle tracks (fietspad).

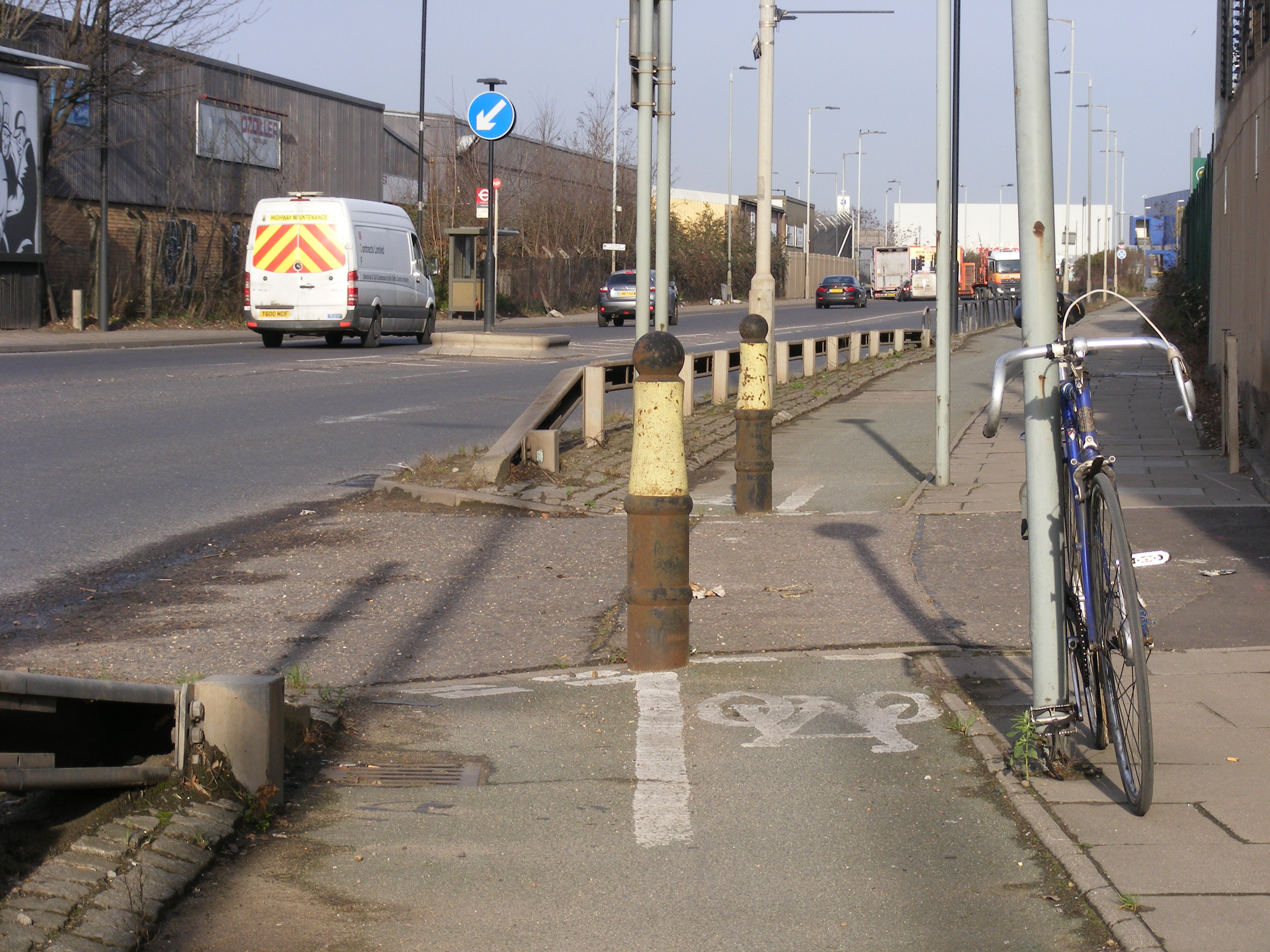
A cycle track in London. The UK has not implemented cycle tracks in a similar manner to the Netherlands.

A cycle track or cycleway (British) or bikeway (mainly North American), sometimes historically referred to as a sidepath, is a separate route for cycles and not motor vehicles. In some cases cycle tracks are also used by other users such as pedestrians and horse riders (see shared-use route). A cycle track can be next to a normal road, and can either be a shared route with pedestrians (common in countries such as the United Kingdom) or be made distinct from both the pavement and general roadway by vertical barriers or elevation differences.

In urban planning, cycle tracks are designed to encourage cycling and reduce motor vehicle congestion and pollution, cycling accidents (by alleviating the conflict between motor vehicles and cycles sharing the same road space) and general confusion and inconvenience for road users.

Cycle tracks may be one-way or two-way, and may be at road level, at sidewalk level, or at an intermediate level. When located alongside normal roads, they usually have some separation from motor traffic in the form of bollards, car parking, barriers or boulevards. Barriers may include curbs, concrete berms, posts, planting/median strips, walls, trenches, or fences. They are often accompanied by a curb extension or other features at intersections to simplify crossing.

In the UK, a cycle track is a road specifically for use by cyclists and not motor vehicles. In Ireland the term cycle track also includes cycle lanes marked on the carriageway, but only if accompanied by a specific sign. In the UK, a cycle track may be alongside a roadway (or carriageway) for all vehicles or it may be on its own alignment. The term does not include cycle lanes or other facilities within an all-vehicle carriageway.

== Impact ==
=== Levels of bicycle traffic ===
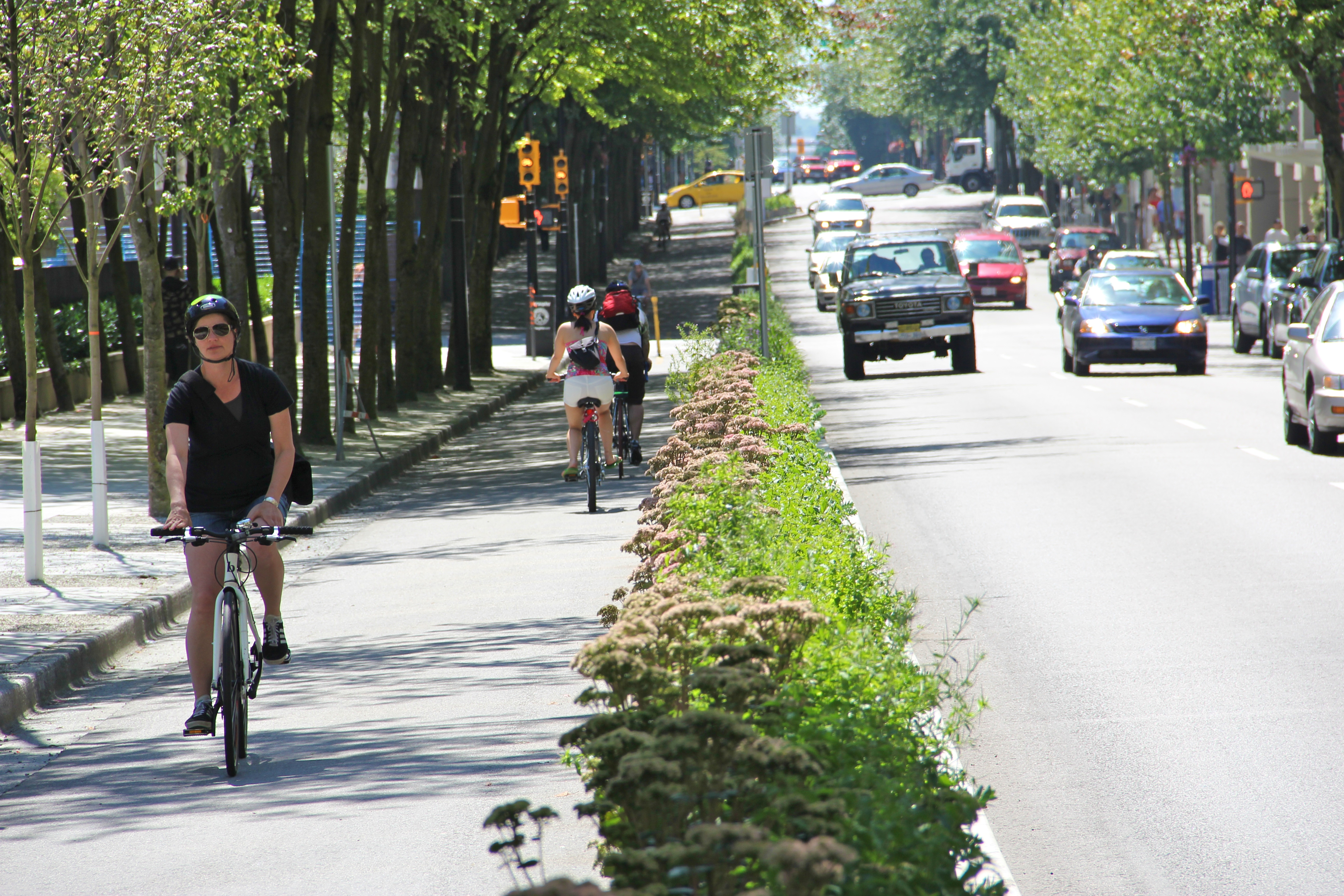
A cycle track in Vancouver. Cities which have built cycle tracks have reported increases in levels of cycling.

In the United States, an academic analysis of eight cycle tracks found that they had increased bike traffic on the street by 75 percent within one year of installation. Rider surveys indicated that 10 percent of riders after installation would have chosen a different mode for that trip without the cycle track, and 25 percent said they were biking more in general since the installation of the cycle track. However, scientific research indicates that different groups of cyclists show varying preferences of which aspects of cycling infrastructure are most relevant when choosing a specific cycling route over another; thus these different preferences need to be accounted for in order to maximize utilization of new cycling infrastructure.

A 2015 study of a street in Toronto, Canada where cycle tracks replaced a painted cycle lane involved a survey of cyclists. Results reported 38% would use other travel modes than cycling before the redevelopment (most of whom would take transit). An improvement to safety was the most commonly cited reason.

=== Safety ===
Recent studies generally affirm that segregated cycle tracks have a better safety record between intersections than cycling on major roads in traffic. The increase in cycling caused by cycle tracks may lead to a "safety in numbers" effect though some contributors caution against this hypothesis. Older studies tended to come to negative conclusions about mid-block cycle track safety.

The implications for road safety of cycle tracks at intersections is disputed. Studies generally show an increase in collisions at junctions, especially where cyclists are travelling in the direction opposite to the flow of traffic (e.g. on two-way cycle tracks). Protected intersection designs generally improve safety records over non-protected junction types.

== Specifications ==
=== Netherlands ===
The Dutch guidance for cycle traffic specifies that one-way cycle paths should be a minimum width of 2 metres.

=== United Kingdom ===
The LTN 1/20 guidance covers cycle infrastructure design in England and Northern Ireland. LTN 1/20 states that one-way cycle tracks should be a minimum of 1.5-2.5 metres depending on the number of cyclists. Two-way cycle tracks should be a minimum of 2-4 m, depending on the number of cyclists.

Cycling by Design covers cycle infrastructure design in Scotland. It specifies a width of minimum width varying from 1.5 to 2.5 metres for one-way tracks and between 2 and 4 metres for two-way tracks. Shared pedestrian tracks should only be used if there are less than 300 cycles per hour at the peak hour and it should be 4 metres (2.5 metres at minimum).

== Gallery ==
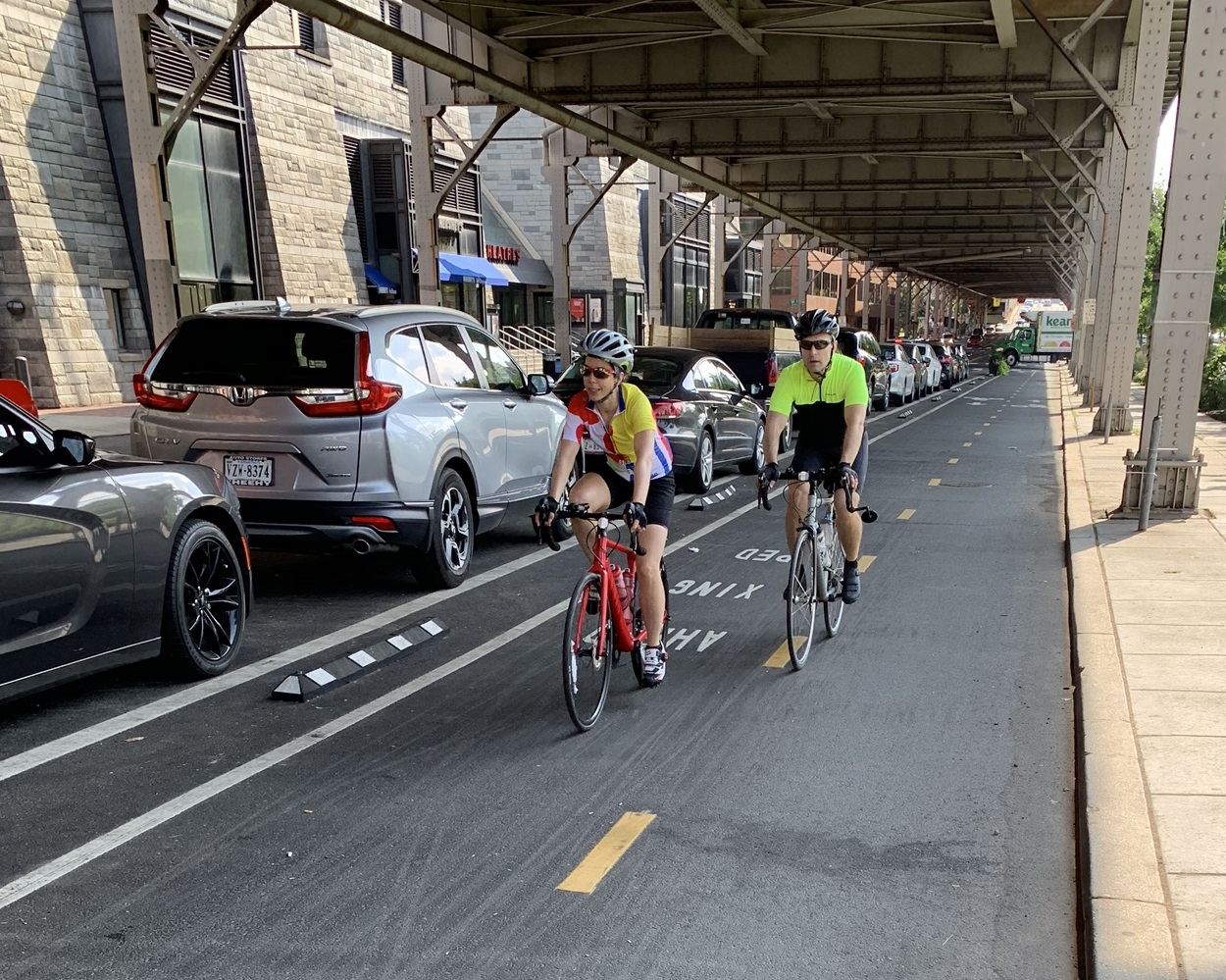
A two-way separated bike lane in Washington, D.C., with parked cars acting as a barrier between bicyclists and traffic

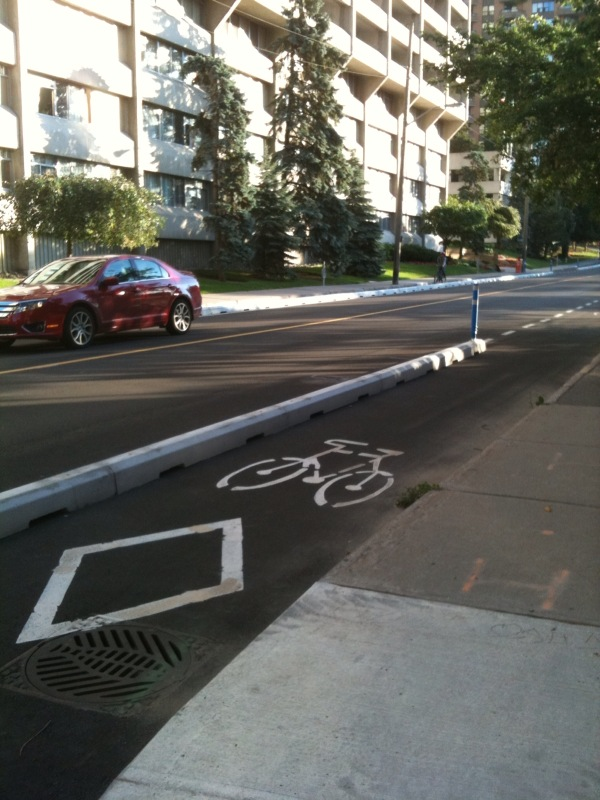
Cycle track with concrete barriers in downtown Ottawa, Ontario, Canada, on Laurier Avenue in 2011

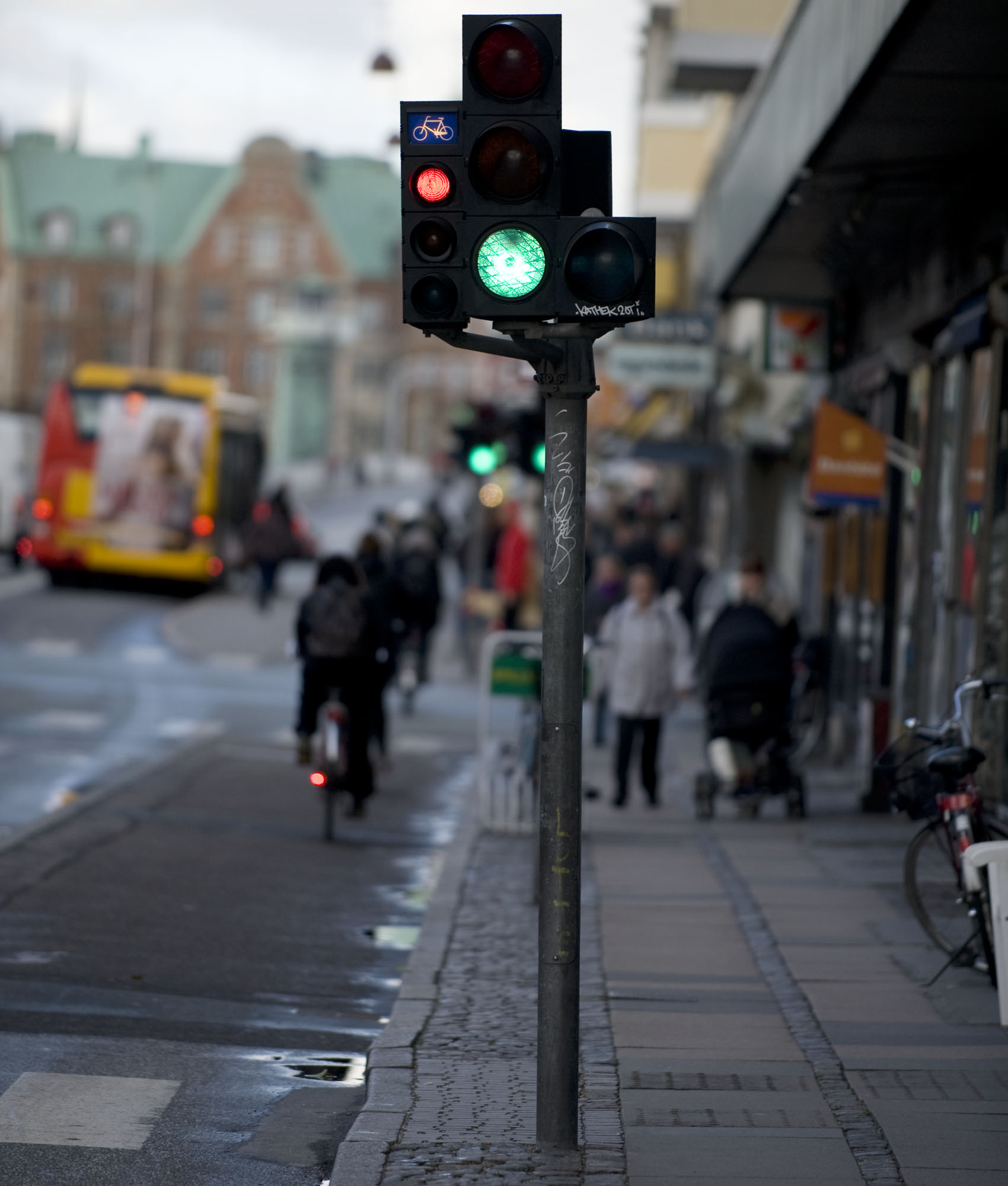
Separate traffic light for motorists and cyclists on cycle track in Denmark

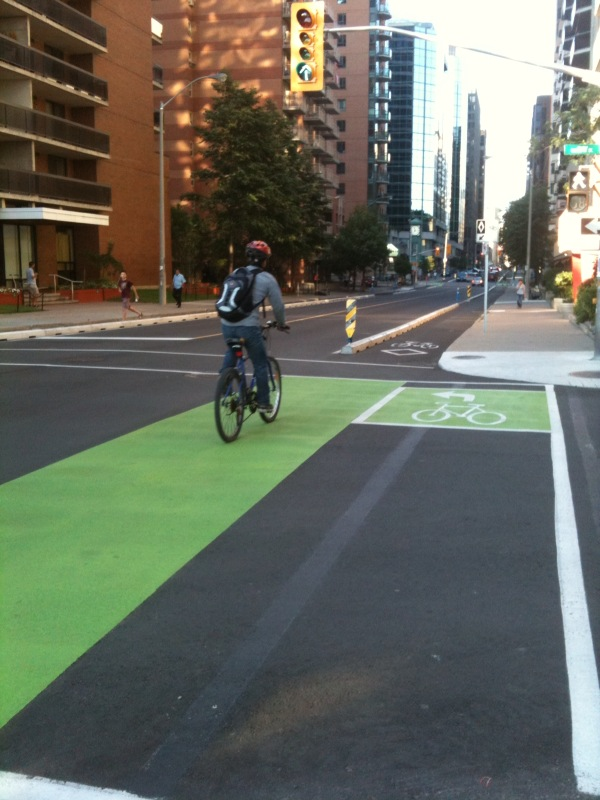
Green cycle lane transitioning into a cycle track with concrete barriers after an intersection in Ottawa, Ontario, Canada (Laurier Avenue), in 2011

== See also ==
- Bikeway safety, including studies on the safety of cycle tracks
- Bikeway and legislation
- Bikeway controversies
- Bikeways
- Cycling infrastructure
- List of cycleways
- Outline of cycling
- Rail trail
