= Bicycle Master Plan =

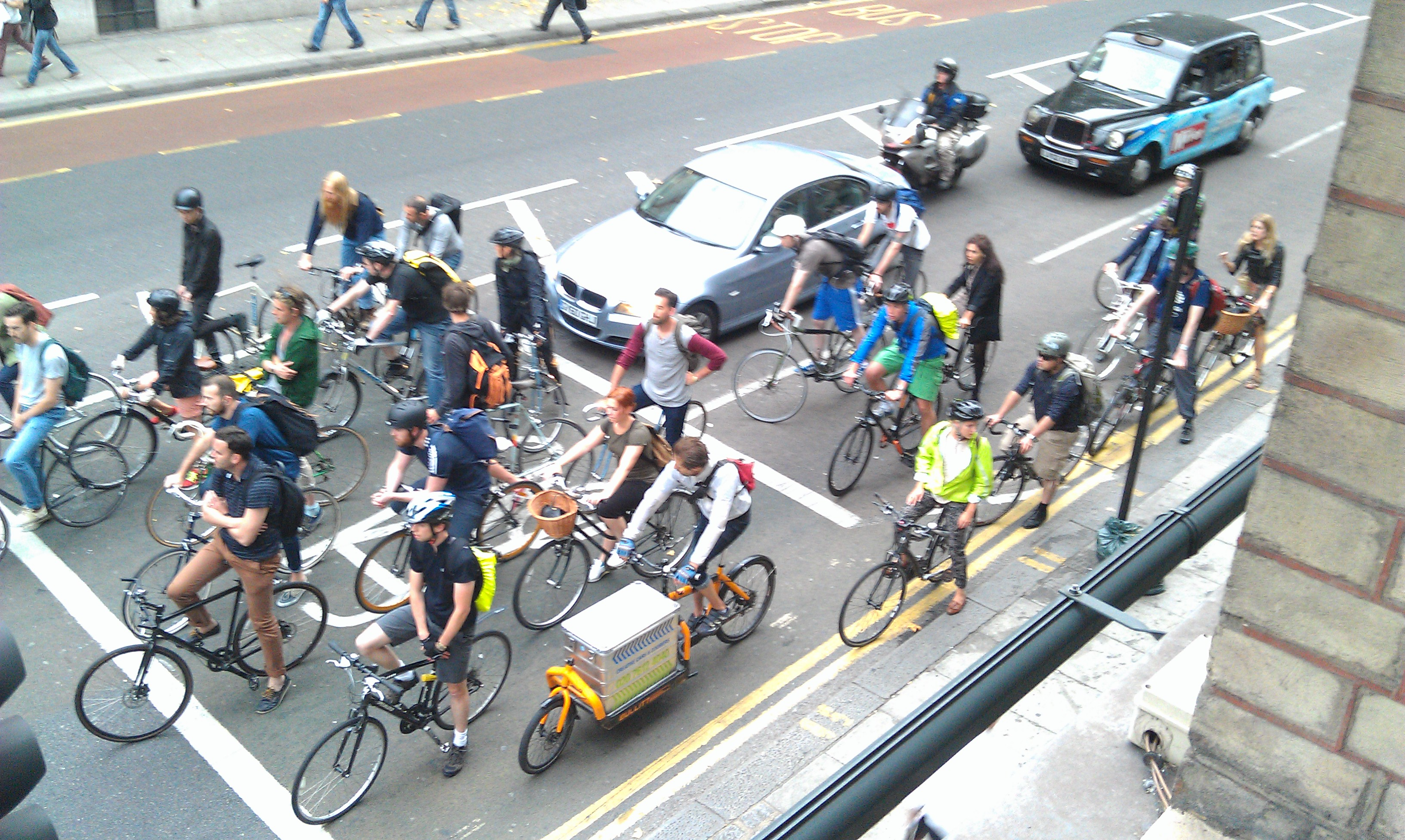
27 cyclists waiting at a traffic light in an advanced stop box illustrate how many cyclists can fit in instead of a couple of cars. They have very varied clothing and different bikes, some wear helmets and reflective vests, but others do not. Not all are "mamil's", and some appear to be transporting goods.

A Bicycle Master Plan is a published development plan describing long-range objectives for developing bicycle infrastructure in a city or region. It may include bicycle paths, protected bicycle lanes, bicycle parking, and integration with public transit as ways to promote bicycling as a viable transportation option.

Many cities have a Bicycle Master Plan, including Seattle, Los Angeles, Portland (Oregon), and Vancouver.

Models to estimate how bicycling can improve health outcomes of residents living in specific census tracts within a city have been developed in Norfolk, VA and San Francisco, CA to inform the Bicycle Master Plan.

== See also ==
- Bicycle transportation planning in Los Angeles
