= National Association of City Transportation Officials =

North American association

- Abbreviation: NACTO
- Formation: 1996; 30 years ago
- Founder: Elliot Sander
- Type: Non-profit association
- Purpose: Transportation engineering
- Headquarters: New York City, New York (State)
- Location: 120 Park Avenue 23rd Floor New York, NY 10017
- Region served: United States, Canada and Mexico
- Members: 82 Total: 25 Member cities; 41 Affiliate member cities; 11 Transit agency members; 5 International members; (2019)
- Chair: Janette Sadik-Khan, Principal, Bloomberg Associates
- President: Michael Carroll, Deputy Managing Director for Transportation and Infrastructure, City of Philadelphia
- Affiliations: Member Cities
- Website: nacto.org

The National Association of City Transportation Officials (NACTO) is a coalition of the Departments of Transportation in North American cities.

Founded in 1996, NACTO has participated in a number of research initiatives dealing with surface transportation in urban areas. Past campaigns have focused on bicycling, bus rapid transit, light rail, bike share, and freight. Its design guides have gained the endorsement of numerous cities, states, and other organizations, in addition to gaining FHWA acceptance for use in conjunction with other mandated guidance and resources. NACTO is headquartered in New York City.

== Designing Cities Conference ==
Since 2012, NACTO has held an annual Designing Cities Conference, convening hundreds of transportation leaders and practitioners from across North America to discuss key trends in urban street design and transportation policy.

Conference sites

- 2012: New York City
- 2013: Phoenix
- 2014: San Francisco
- 2015: Austin
- 2016: Seattle
- 2017: Chicago
- 2018: Los Angeles
- 2019: Toronto
- 2022: Boston (postponed from 2020)
- 2023: Denver
- 2024: Miami
- 2025: Washington D.C.
- 2026: Minneapolis

== Global Designing Cities ==
In October 2014, the Global Designing Cities Initiative was launched as a subsidiary of NACTO to bring guidance for safe streets to an international audience. It focuses on the critical role of streets within urban environments in cities around the world. The Initiative was announced at NACTO's 2014 Designing Cities Conference in San Francisco.

The initiative will work especially close with the 10 cities chosen to be a focus of the Bloomberg Initiative for Global Road Safety: Accra, Addis Ababa, Bandung, Bangkok, Bogotá, Fortaleza, Ho Chi Minh City, Mumbai, São Paulo, and Shanghai.

== Bike Share ==
The NACTO Bike Share initiative aims to strengthen bike sharing programs in its member cities, with a focus on improving social equity impact and reaching underrepresented groups. The Bike Share initiative provides bike share program managers and cities with best-practices research as well as a forum to exchange knowledge.

== Design Guides ==
NACTO's Design Guides provide innovative street design guidelines, made specifically for urban settings.

=== Urban Bikeway Design Guide ===
In March 2011 the NACTO Urban Bikeway Design Guide, part of the Cities for Cycling initiative, was officially released. Janette Sadik-Khan, the New York City Department of Transportation Commissioner, announced the release at the National Bike Summit in Washington, D.C. The Bikeway Design Guide provides technical guidance on over twenty different bicycle infrastructure designs. These include buffered bike lanes, cycle tracks, advanced stop line (bike boxes), and several other treatments which have not been officially adopted into AASHTO or MUTCD manuals. Many of these designs have already been implemented in cities across the United States and are widely used in Europe and Canada. Bicycle facilities from New York City and Portland, Oregon, are heavily featured in the guide, though case studies from cities all throughout the United States are represented as well. A second edition was released in 2014. In 2025, NACTO released the third edition of the Urban Bikeway Design Guide, overhauled with new practices and more detailed technical guidance. The Guide is available in print and online.

=== Urban Street Design Guide ===
In September 2013, NACTO released the Urban Street Design Guide, which provides design guidance on street facilities, including boulevards, neighborhood streets, transit corridors, and green alleys. It provides technical details on street design elements like curb extensions, lane widths, sidewalks, crosswalks, and traffic signal timing.

The Infrastructure Investment and Jobs Act of 2021–also known as the Bipartisan Infrastructure Law–explicitly permits cities to use the Urban Street Design Guide when implementing federally-funded projects on city-owned streets.

=== Transit Street Design Guide ===
The NACTO Transit Street Design Guide, showcasing how to improve transit using innovative street design, was published in April 2015.

=== Urban Street Stormwater Guide ===
The NACTO Urban Street Stormwater Guide, showcasing tools to design streets for stormwater management, was released in June 2017.

=== City Limits ===
City Limits, which outlines how to set safe speed limits in urban environments, was released in July 2020.

== Membership ==
Membership is open to cities in the US, Canada, and Mexico. Full member cities must have more than 400,000 residents or be the core city in a metropolitan statistical area with at least 2 million people. Affiliate membership is offered to cities with fewer than 400,000 residents.

In 2013, NACTO began an international membership, which five cities are members of as of 2019. This uses slightly different metrics: A minimum of 900,000 city population or metropolitan area of at least 2 million for full membership; and a minimum of requiring a minimum of 300,000 for affiliate membership.

NACTO bylaws also offer affiliate membership to cities with more than 300,000 residents that are secondary cities in an MSA with a larger core city (e.g. Oakland, where San Francisco is the core city in its MSA).

In 2015, NACTO began offering affiliate membership for transit agencies.

== Leadership ==
NACTO's executive board is made up of four elected full Member representatives, one Affiliate Member representative, and the Chair of the Strategic Advisory Board. The executive board is elected by NACTO member city representatives.

== See also ==
- American Association of State Highway and Transportation Officials
- Adventure Cycling Association
- Bikeway safety
- Cycling infrastructure
- History of cycling infrastructure
- National cycling route network
- United States Bicycle Route System
