= Shared bus and cycle lane =

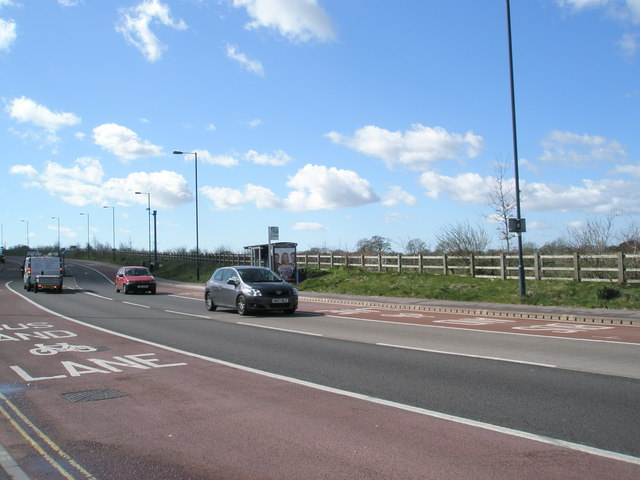
Bike and bus lane on London Road, Hampshire

A shared bus and cycle lane is a bus lane that allows cyclists to use it. Depending on the width of the lane, the speeds and number of buses, and other local factors, the safety and popularity of this arrangement vary.

Research carried out by the Transport Research Laboratory (TRL) describes shared bus cycle lanes as "generally very popular" with cyclists. Guidance produced for Cycling England endorses bus lanes because they provide cyclists with a "direct and barrier-free route into town centres" while avoiding complications related to shared-use footways. A French survey found that 42% of cyclists were "enthusiasts" for shared bus-bike lanes, versus 33% who had mixed opinions, and 27% who opposed them. Many cycling activists view these as being more attractive than cycle paths, while others object to being close to bus exhausts, a problem easily avoided through replacing exhaust buses with electric ones.

== Mainland Europe ==
In the Netherlands mixed bus/cycle lanes are uncommon. According to the Sustainable Safety guidelines they would violate the principle of homogeneity and put road users of very different masses and speed behaviour into the same lane, which is generally discouraged.

As of 2003, mixed bus/cycle lanes accounted for 118 km of the 260 km of cycling facilities in Paris. The French city of Bordeaux has 40 km of shared bus cycle lanes. It is reported that in the city of Bristol, a showcase bus priority corridor, where road space was re-allocated along a 14 km stretch also resulted in more space for cyclists and had the effect of increasing cycling. The reverse effect has also been suggested. A review carried out in London reports that cycling levels fell across Kew bridge following the removal of a bus lane, despite a general increase in cycling in the city.

In addition, it is arguably easier, politically speaking, to argue for funding of joint facilities rather than separately asking for cycling facilities and bus-only lanes. Bus lane proposals often run into opposition from cyclists because creating space for bus lanes generally results in narrowing the other lanes shared by cars and cyclists. Incidentally, the TRL reports that cyclists and bus drivers tend to have low opinions of one another. In some cities, arrangements work successfully with bus companies and cyclists' groups ensure communication and understanding between the two groups of road users.

== See also ==
- Cycling infrastructure
