= Safety of cycling infrastructure =

Overview of bicycle safety concerns

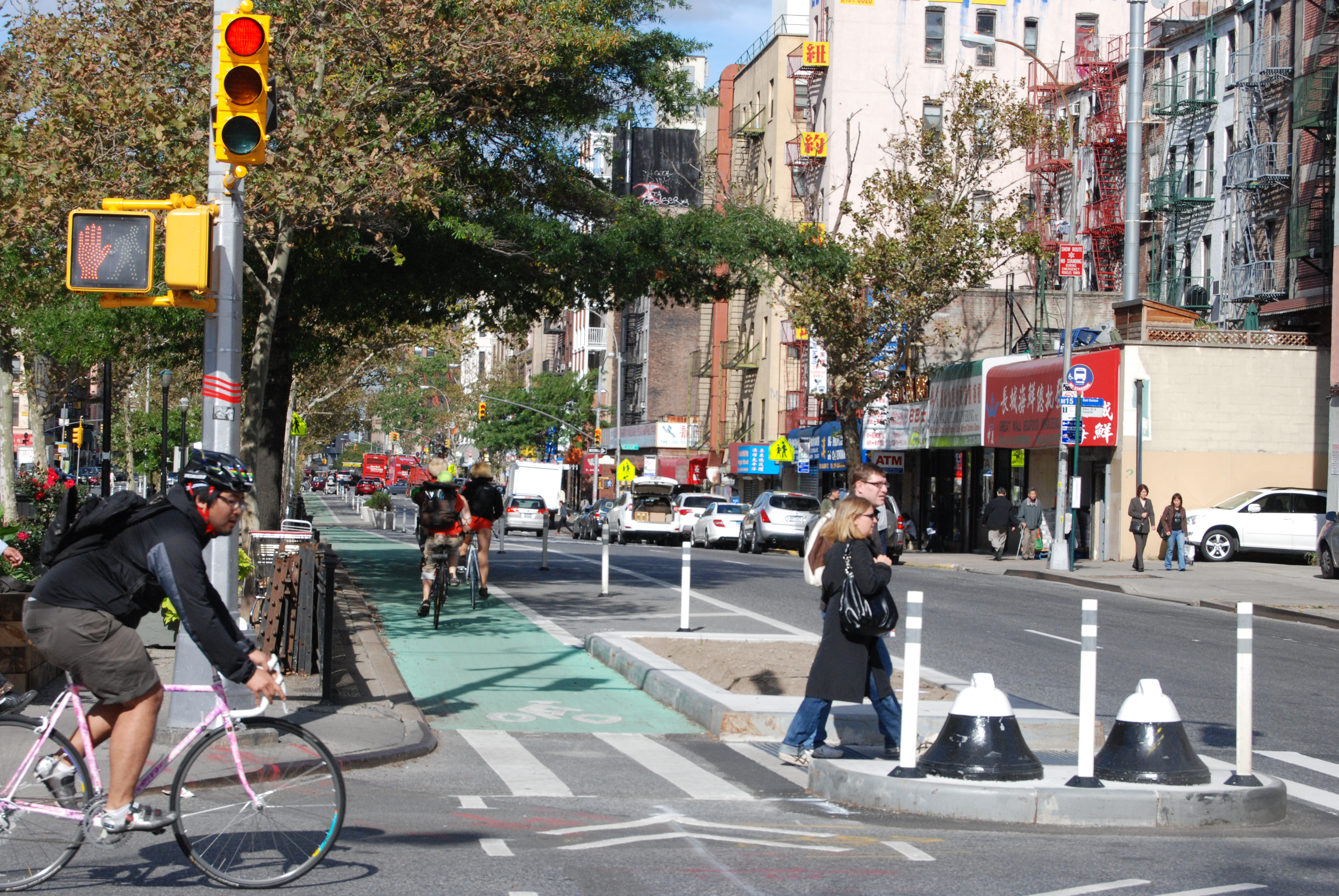
Dedicated cycling facility in New York City

There is debate over the safety implications of cycling infrastructure (e.g. cycle tracks, protected intersections). Recent studies generally affirm that segregated cycle tracks have a better safety record between intersections than cycling on major roads in traffic. Furthermore, cycling infrastructure tends to lead to more people cycling. A higher modal share of people cycling is correlated with lower incidences of cyclist fatalities, leading to a "safety in numbers" effect though some contributors caution against this hypothesis. On the contrary, older studies tended to come to negative conclusions about mid-block cycle track safety.

However, the implications for road safety of cycle tracks at intersections is disputed. Studies generally show an increase in collisions at junctions, especially where cyclists are travelling in the direction opposite to the flow of traffic (e.g. on two-way cycle tracks). Protected intersection designs generally improve safety records over non-protected junction types.

A 2006 report by the National Cooperative Highway Research Program in the US concludes that "bicycle safety data are difficult to analyze, mostly because bicycle trip data (and thus accident probability per trip) are hard to uncover". One major reason for the inability to draw definite conclusion may be that facilities with different risks are often categorized together so that off-road paths – paved or unpaved, bicycle-only or multi-use – were lumped together, as found by research at the Cycling in Cities program at the University of British Columbia.

== Safety in numbers effect ==
A study by Peter L. Jacobsen found that as cycling and walking levels increase, the chance that a given cyclist will be struck by a motor vehicle actually decreases. This pattern is consistent across communities of varying size, from specific intersections to cities and countries, and across time periods. Jacobsen found that doubling the number of cyclists on the road tends to bring about a one-third drop in the per-cyclist frequency of a crash with a motor vehicle. By the same token, tripling the rate of cycling cuts the crash rate in half. A study of the accident impacts of re-engineering bicycle crossings in the Swedish city of Gothenburg appears to corroborate those findings by attributing collision rate reductions in part to significant increases in cyclist volumes at the treated sites. Studies have demonstrated that cities with high levels of cycling tend to have better traffic safety records for all road users. However, the same study also suggests that the 'safety in numbers' effect is not as important in improving safety records as building cycling infrastructure. Improving bike infrastructure with more separated facilities leads to lower fatalities and more safety for all road users.

Furthermore, countries which have higher levels of cycling have lower fatality rates for cyclists than countries which do not. The table below shows the modal split share for cycling compared with the cycling fatality rate in the Netherlands, Germany and the United States.

Cycling safety by modal split share by country (Pucher, 2001)
Country	Cycling modal split share	Fatality rate per 100 million bike trips
Netherlands	28%	1.6
Germany	12%	2.4
United States	<1%	26.3

A unpublished paper from the Helsinki City Planning Department reported that the Netherlands, Sweden and Denmark, known for cycle networks and one-way cycle tracks, had the lowest rates of cyclist fatalities, while countries without such extensive networks such as Great Britain and Italy reported higher rates.

There is evidence that one of the main factors influencing the individual safety of cyclists is the number of cyclists using the roads, commonly called the safety in numbers effect. Cycling facilities increase the perception of safety, leaving aside the evidence supporting or detracting from their actual risk. Cycling increases on routes with cycling facilities, particularly if they are separated cycle tracks. With greater numbers of cyclists in relation to motorists, the safety in number effect is seen.

Detractors argue that the most prominent examples of "successful" cycle networks were implemented in towns that already had significant numbers of cyclists. In the Netherlands, for example, drivers know to expect a high volume of cyclist traffic and bicycle paths are widespread and (in the cities) closed to scooters. Due to this expectation, some argue, the number of car-bike collisions with serious consequences is not alarmingly high in the Netherlands. In such cases, it is speculated that an existing large cycling population might already exert a "safety in numbers" effect, and it is this, rather than their diversion onto off-road tracks, that accounts for the better safety record. More people might start cycling if the perceived safety of doing so improved sufficiently.

Bhatia and Wier caution against the "Safety in Numbers" hypothesis, because it is unsubstantiated. The claim that larger numbers changes motorist behaviour is judged as premature and the authors urge better research into the topic. A 2019 study of the relation between bicycling rates and road safety concluded that 'more bicyclists on the road is not as important as the infrastructure we build for them'.

== In general ==
Aultman-Hall et al. produced a 1998 study based on a survey of Ottawa commuter cyclists and a survey of Toronto commuter cyclists. The surveys were conducted to create "estimates of travel exposure on roads, off-road paths and sidewalks". They found that "the relative rates for falls and injuries suggest it is safest to cycle on-road followed by off-road paths and trails, and finally least safe on sidewalks." The relative rates of collisions on the three different facility types, however, were not statistically significant in the Ottawa study. Aultman-Hall et al. admitted that the limitations to the data and a fuller analysis needed "bicycle travel exposure information and the use of more than just collision databases".

Studies that also found negative safety aspects of cycle tracks also come from Linderholm, Sweden, 1984 and from Jensen et al., Denmark 1997.

Opponents of segregated cycle facilities say that segregation of cyclists from fast or frequent motorized traffic increases crash and injury rates. For example, the author of a 2014 review of cycling safety concluded that the majority of studies showed increased crash and injury rates on segregated cycle facilities. He criticized the methodology of studies showing the opposite, including the Montreal study.

A study on cycling safety in the Netherlands reviewed how the Dutch achieved an 80% reduction in the number of cyclists killed per distance cycled over a 30-year period. Some factors in this reduction were the establishment of a road hierarchy (the Dutch 'unbundling' approach) with separate routes for fast-moving motor traffic and slower-moving cycle traffic and an extensive network of separated bicycle paths and intersection treatments. The study highlighted not just the importance of infrastructure which takes cyclists off busy roads, but also takes motorists off less-suitable roads. The Netherlands' extensive motorway network shifts large amounts of traffic from city roads to spaces away from more vulnerable road users.

A 2019 study of the relation between bicycling rates and road safety found that cities with more protected cycle facilities correlates with better road safety records.

A study in Amsterdam found that cycle lanes incur nearly double the risk of cyclist crashes compared to cycle tracks. The absence of cycling facilities was not significant until streets with similar conditions are compared. For three given streets with similar conditions - one with cycle tracks, one with cycle lanes and one with no facilities - the risk of a crash is higher on a street with no facilities or cycle lanes rather than cycle tracks. Overall, the study reports a safety benefit of 50-60% fewer cycling crashes of cycle tracks over mixed traffic. Kerbside parking leads to increased crashes due to dooring and visibility obstructions.

A 2021 study confirmed an expectation that the presence of protected bike lanes is associated with significant improvement in biking safety. The model predicts that by adding bike lanes to non-local streets increases biking safety by 26% in a local area.

A 2026 data from NY confirms that during evening rush hours in NY "accounts for 33.7% of all bicycle crashes, representing the most dangerous time for NYC cyclists as heavy traffic combines with peak cycling commute volumes and reduced visibility during winter months." Overall, this data reports the risk injuries and collisions cyclist face when trying to commute in a busy city like NY or in other general busy cities with safety bike lane procedures in use. Despite all of the work done to prevent bicycle crashes the data states "nearly all two-thirds of all bicycle crashes 64.6% occur at intersections meaning that the main cause of all incidents are vehicles and cyclist being the primary safety challenges of bike lanes."

Map of NYC where most incidents occur

== Between intersections ==
In the 1970s, the California Statewide Bicycle Committee commissioned Kenneth D. Cross to study car-bike collisions. The Committee had supposed that many collisions would occur when cars overtook bicycles and that such a finding would help to justify their plans to offer segregation between junctions. Unexpectedly, Cross found that only 0.5% of car-bike collisions had occurred between straight-ahead cyclists and overtaking straight-ahead motorists. Cross in 1977 had a contract with the National Highway Traffic Safety Administration (NHTSA) to produce an improved study (on a pseudo-random national sample), and the results were much the same. In second study by Cross, he argues that, "although a reduction in overtaking accidents may not be sufficient justification for the widespread use of on-street bicycle lanes, it is possible that their cost could be justified when considering all the problem types that might be positively affected by such facilities. There is virtually no doubt that off-street bicycle lanes would reduce the incidence of overtaking accidents, if such facilities were available and used by bicyclists who would otherwise be riding on roadways."

A 1988 British medical study suggested that their data indicated that cycle lanes were safer than ordinary roads, reducing the kilometre rate of collisions.

A 1997 study by William E Moritz of North American bicycle commuters calculated a relative danger of different facilities based on the survey results of "[fraction of crashes] divided by the [fraction of miles ridden on that facility]". Moritz calculated a relative danger of 1.26 (worst) on a major street with no cycling facilities, 1.04 on a minor street with no cycling facilities, 0.67 for mixed use/"bike" path, and 0.5 (best) for streets with bike lanes. The "other" category, which mostly included sidewalks, had a relative danger of 5.32. Moritz made it clear that this was "[n]ot a statistical or random sample of BCs [bicycle commuters]."

In Germany, the Berlin police conducted a 1987 study which came to a negative conclusion about cycle tracks. The German Cycling Federation at the 1990 Vélo Secur conference on cycling stated "Because the separation of different types of traffic by means of sidepaths behind curbs makes excessive demands on users and leads to crashes, other solutions are being increasingly recommended for channeling bicycle traffic." The cycle tracks in Berlin, however, were not removed and Berlin continues to have an extensive network of bicycle facilities on- and off-road, including cycle tracks.

A 1999 study in Helsinki found that two-way cycle tracks accounted for a disproportionate number of cycling injury collisions. However, the study did not account for injury severity, and as a result may have underestimated the benefit of two-way cycle tracks in reducing severe injuries associated with overtaking (i.e. the most common cause of fatal cyclist collisions).

British cycling safety educator John Franklin has argued that the vast majority of research implies increases in the rate and severity of car-bicycle collisions due to such segregation, based on an overview of studies published up to 1999. For example, his study into Milton Keynes' "redways" (shared-use) in the late 90s discovered that the city's grid roads (60 and 70 mph rural-style arterial roads) are the safest in terms of accidents to cyclists per distance cycled. Cyclists were found to be more likely to be killed when using a redway than a grid road. He attributes this to poor user discipline on the redways, under a false illusion of safety, which also spills into other areas, such as increased footway cycling. Redways are shared use with pedestrians and not true cycle tracks. Neither user finds this to be a satisfactory arrangement, that the redways are sites of increased fear among users.

Transportation engineers Ian Hallett, David Luskin, and Randy Machemehl, by studying the interactions of drivers and bicyclists on Texas roads, have discovered that having painted bike lanes on streets and roads helps both commuters stay in safer, more central positions in their respective lanes. Without a marked bike lane, there appears to be a lot of uncertainty about how much space each person needs—even when adequate road space is provided.

A 2007 unpublished study in Copenhagen found that one-way cycle tracks reduced rear-end collisions, while increasing crashes with right-turning vehicles and crashes with other cyclists and pedestrians. There was also an increase in collisions with bus passengers where they exit directly onto the cycle track. The study had accuracy problems in its prediction model.

In the United Kingdom, the UK Cycle Campaign Network made a 2007 statement that they know "of no evidence that cycle facilities and in particular cycle lanes, generally lead to safer conditions for cycling".

In 2009, the University of British Columbia Cycling in Cities Research Program looked at injury and crash data separated by bicycle facility type and found that "purpose-built bicycle-only facilities have the lowest risk of crashes and injuries". They found such bike-only facilities had lower risk than cycling on-road with motor traffic as well as off-road with pedestrians on sidewalks or multi-use paths. The highest risk of crashes and injuries were found to be on sidewalks and unpaved off-road trails.

A large study undertaken by S.U. Jensen et al. into the safety of Copenhagen cycle tracks before and after they were constructed concludes "The construction of cycle tracks in Copenhagen has resulted in an increase in cycle traffic of 18–20% and a decline in car traffic of 9–10%. The cycle tracks constructed have resulted in increases in accidents and injuries of 9–10% on the reconstructed roads." The number of accidents and injuries increased at intersections but decreased mid-block. These changes in road safety have been estimated taking both general trends in safety and changes in car and cycle traffic into account. The Copenhagen study also found accident and injury rates were related to the amount of car parking and number of turn lanes, blue cycle crossing markings, and raised exits at non-signalised intersections, suggesting that risk is dependent on making various improvements to the cycle tracks. For instance, recent planning guidelines in the US advise that cycle tracks drop to a bike lane before arriving at an intersection to increase the visibility of cyclists. The British Cycling Embassy criticises this study because the before-and-after design makes it impossible to isolate the effects of the cycle track design from changes in the types of cyclists (less confident/experienced cyclists) using the street. Furthermore, the study is based on a predictive model. The study alters the 'before' figures to account for the changes in traffic composition before and after the track installation.

A number of studies found that on-road marked bike lanes have a positive safety effect. They reduce road safety events by about 50% compared to unmarked roadways.

According to one literature review, clearly-marked, bike-specific facilities are consistently shown by studies on the topic to improve safety for cyclists compared to riding with traffic or off-road with pedestrians.

A 2010 study in Montreal, Canada authors found 2.5 times as many cyclists rode on the cycle tracks (physically separated bicycle-exclusive paths along roads) compared to the reference roads (a parallel road with approximately the same intersection frequency and cross traffic) and that the relative risk of injury was lower on a cycle track than on the comparable reference road (the average being 0.72 the relative risk). They concluded that "[c]ycle tracks lessen, or at least do not increase, crash and injury rates compared to bicycling in the street"

A 2010 study of Texan cities found that cycle lanes are a safer environment than wide outside lanes and that parked car buffers are the only reliable method to prevent dooring.

In 2012, a study in Canada found that cycling on segregated tracks had approximately one ninth the risk of cycling on major streets with parked cars and no cycle infrastructure, concluding that, "Transportation infrastructure with lower bicycling injury risks merits public health support to reduce injuries and promote cycling."

A 2017 study into the Netherlands called the overall safety effect of one-way cycle tracks "positive" but noted the worse safety record of two-way tracks compared with one-way tracks.

A 2019 US-based medical study found that 'the implementation of urban bike lanes improved bicyclist safety'.

A 2020 study in Toronto, Canada, found that cycle track implementation is linked with reduced cycle-motorist collisions after adjusting for increased volume. There is also a 35% reduction in these collisions for up to 550 m from the cycle track, which is attributed to more cyclists moving from surrounding streets to the cycle track.

=== Crashes from motorists overtaking cyclist on arterial roads ===
One benefit of cycle tracks is the reduction of motorist-overtaking collisions. There are more rear impacts with cyclists on arterial/rural-type roads. When they occur in such circumstances, they are also associated with significantly increased risk of fatality. Rear-end type collisions by overtaking motorists who didn't see the cyclist (Type 13 in the Cross-Fisher study) have been characterized as negligibly few in one analysis by John Forester and another analysis by Kenneth Cross characterized them as being the most deadly of crashes – three times the fatalities of other crash types (both used the same data). All motorist overtaking crashes were combined by Cross into a category called "Problem Class D–Motorist Overtaking/Overtaking Threat" accounting for 37.8% of fatal crashes and 10.5% of non-fatal crashes in their study. One possible explanation for the low overall number of collisions is that motorists coming from behind have plenty of time to see and avoid the collision, but another "possible explanation for the low number of overtaking collisions is that, as noted earlier, bicyclists fear and avoid roads where the overtaking threat seems greatest". Though such crashes were not in the majority they both had a perception of being quite dangerous by the majority of cyclists as well as having a high percentage of the fatal crashes.

In the UK, cycling collision data recorded by police indicates that at non-junction locations, where a cyclist was struck directly from behind there was an overall fatality rate of 17%. The rate of fatality increases with speed limit of the road:

- 5% on 30 mph (48 km/h),
- 13% on 40 mph (64 km/h),
- 21% on 60 mph (97 km/h) and
- 31% on 70 mph (110 km/h) roads.

The use of appropriately designed segregated space on arterial or interurban routes appears to be associated with reductions in overall risk. In Ireland, the provision of hard shoulders on interurban routes in the 1970s reportedly resulted in a 50% decrease in accidents. It is reported that the Danes have also found that separate cycle tracks lead to a reduction in rural collisions.

== At junctions ==
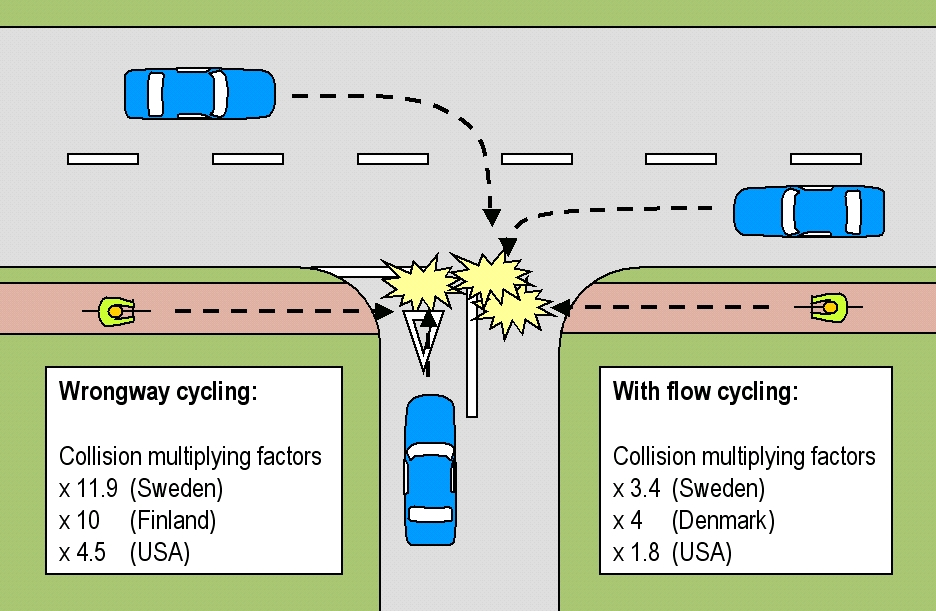
Diagram showing relative increases in collision rates for users of a common type of segregated cycle path

Relative risks of crossing an intersection. Crossing on a set-back cycle path was found to be up to 11.9 times more risky in one study than straight crossing on a road.

In 1988, a Dutch study found that cycle tracks in built up areas are safer for cyclists and moped riders between junctions, but have an increased collision rate at junctions. Therefore, the study recommends cycle tracks are ended before the junction.

A 1994 study in Palo Alto, California by A. Wachtel and D. Lewiston concluded that "Bicyclists on a sidewalk or bicycle path incur greater risk than those on the roadway (on average 1.8 times as great), most likely because of blind conflicts at intersections. Wrong-way sidewalk bicyclists are at even greater risk, and sidewalk bicycling appears to increase the incidence of wrong-way travel." and "Separation of bicycles and motor vehicles leads to blind conflicts at these intersections." It concluded "the aim of a well-designed roadway system should be to integrate bicycles and motor vehicles according to the well-established and effective principles of traffic law and engineering, not to separate them. This conclusion is in accord with the 1981 and 1991 AASHTO Guides and the California Highway Design Manual". Anne C. Lusk et al. noted that the study by Wachtel and Lewiston only considered intersection crashes, "omitting non-intersection crashes that include being hit from behind, sideswiped, or struck by a car door." If the non-intersection crash data is included, as Lusk et al. calculated in their study, it appears that sidewalk bikeways carry half the risk of the street, for bicyclists riding in the same direction as traffic. Lusk et al. claim that the "Wachtel and Lewiston data, when corrected to include non-intersection crashes, corroborate our findings that separated paths are safer or at least no more dangerous than bicycling in the street."

A Danish study by Agerholm et al. in 2008 concluded that "Through the years many studies have shown that bicycle paths in built-up areas impair traffic safety. A new Danish study presented in this article confirms these results... the main results are that bicycle paths impair traffic safety and this is mainly due to more accidents at intersections, and that there has been no improvement in the design of new bicycle paths compared to the older ones."

A 2020 study in Toronto, Canada found that the majority of cyclist-motorist collisions on roads with cycle tracks occur at intersections, though the increase of intersection's proportion of total collisions is minimal. The frequency of collisions at signalised intersections increased from 8% to 22%.

=== Side road crossings ===
At non-signalised junctions, cyclists face risks from turning motor traffic. This is dependent on the degree of setback of the cycle track from the carriageway edge and whether the cycle track is one- or two-way. Research presented by the ADFC (German Cycling Federation) at a conference at Lund University in 1990 found that "crash risk" for cycle users crossing the intersection on a set-back path are up to 11.9 times higher than when cycling on the roadway in a bike lane (see diagrams). Since 1990, the ADFC now advocates for the introduction of both cycle tracks and cycle lanes. The organisation only supports cycle lanes on roads up to 50 km/h. The ADFC calls protected cycle lanes "a very safe, high quality and well-suited form of routing for cycle traffic". (Note: Quote translated from original German using Google Translate.)

A 2017 Dutch study found that the likelihood of crashes at unsignalised intersections with one-way cycle paths is 45% lower when the track is deflected between 2 and 5 metres from the kerb. Compared with one-way cycle tracks, two-way tracks have a 75% elevated risk of collisions at unsignalised junctions because drivers coming from minor roads do not expect cyclists to come from both directions. The same study found that protected intersections in the Netherlands, with speed reduction measures and a clearance of 2 to 5 metres between the cycle track and the carriageway improve cycling safety, particularly because it keeps cyclists out of the blind spots of right-turning trucks.

=== Solutions to the junction safety problem ===
Remedial measures have been developed in an attempt to reduce the risk of junctions for cycle tracks. In some environments these represent established engineering practice while in others they may have to be retroactively applied in response to complaints and safety concerns. Examples include the addition of a separate system of traffic signals for bicycle traffic; markings – either coloured or sharrows continued through the intersection; bike boxes with no right turn on red lights for motorists, raised intersections, and elimination of car parking or the barrier as the cycle track approaches the intersection.

Some treatments involve raising the cycle track onto a speed ramp-type structure where it crosses side roads ("raised side road crossings"). In addition, various road markings have been developed in an attempt to remedy the issue of increased junction collisions. Examples of these include the use of special road markings, e.g. "sharks teeth" or "elephants footprints", and treatments using red, green or blue coloured tarmac. Other less cycle-friendly approaches include efforts to "traffic calm" the bicycle traffic by introducing tight curves or bends to slow the cyclists down as they near a junction. Alternatively, traffic engineers may remove priority from the cyclists and require them to yield to turning traffic at every side road. In 2002, engineers proposing a sidepath scheme in the Irish university city of Galway stated that cyclists would be required to dismount and "become pedestrians" at every junction on the finished route.

Protected intersection design based on a common Dutch model, preserving the physical segregation of the cycle lane throughout the intersection.

A common Dutch model for improving the safety of cycle tracks at junctions involves separating cars turning right by a car length from crossing cyclists and pedestrians, providing increased reaction times and visibility. Alta Planning & Design popularized this as the "protected intersection" model.

Intersection designs which route cyclists around an intersection separately from motorists leads to a safer road environment than bike lanes or in-traffic cycling. The most common road danger associated with them is the "looked but failed to see" event, whereby a motorist does not see a cyclist because they are not specifically looking for them.

A 2016 study of intersections with bicycle tracks found that cycle tracks on the right (nearside) through a junction were safer than having no cycle tracks at a junction. This is associated with 25% fewer interactions than with no cycle tracks. Cycle tracks on the left were found to have no real effect on safety compared with no cycle tracks. Interaction severity reduces as more cyclists use the junction. More turning vehicles and more approach lanes results in more risk to cyclists.

=== Roundabouts ===
Studies show that multi-lane roundabouts significantly increase risk to cyclists unless a separated cycle track is provided. Furthermore the installation of marked bike lanes on a roundabout leads to higher risks for cyclists. The installation of separated cycle tracks around roundabouts leads to no change or risk reductions for cyclists.

In the United Kingdom and Germany there is some concern to the use of cycle lanes in large urban roundabouts, though it is still common to see such facilities in the Netherlands and elsewhere. In 2002, cycle lanes were removed from a roundabout in the English town of Weymouth after 20 months because the casualty rate had increased significantly, according to the local cycling campaign. German research has indicated that cyclists are safer negotiating roundabouts in traffic rather than on separate cycle lanes or cycle paths. A 2005 paper on German roundabout design practice states "Cycle lanes at the peripheral margin of the circle are not allowed since they are very dangerous to cyclists".

In the Netherlands, researchers focused on separating bicycle tracks from motorised traffic. They found that "roundabouts with separate bicycle tracks have a much lower number of casualties per roundabout than roundabouts with bicycle lanes, van Minnen (1995)". This meant that Dutch planners focused more on designing roundabouts and cycle tracks with appropriate priority rather than mix cyclists with other traffic or put them on cycle lanes at the edge. A 2009 study on Dutch roundabouts found that roundabouts with separated cycle tracks had a greater safety effect than those with on-road marked bike lanes or no dedicated infrastructure.

For adults, the standard advice in the vehicular cycling philosophy for handling roundabouts is to try to maintain a prominent position while circulating. The use of cycle lanes runs counter to this vehicular cycling approach and places cyclists outside the main "zone of observation" of entering motorists, who represent the major source risk.

== Changes for all road users ==
The New York City Department of Transportation implemented a bicycle path and traffic calming pilot project for Prospect Park West in Brooklyn in 2010 and published their results in early 2011. It created a two-way bicycle path with a 3 foot (0.91 m) parking lane buffer and the removal of one lane from motor vehicles. They found that weekday cycling traffic tripled after the implementation; cyclists riding on the sidewalk fell to 3% from 46% (the count included children who are legally allowed to ride on the sidewalk); speeding dropped from 74% to 20% of all vehicles; crashes for all road users were down 16% and injuries to all road users were down 21%.

=== Pedestrians ===
The provision of bike lanes or shared-use paths may result in additional risk to pedestrians. This is particularly likely to be the case where cycle lanes are not readily distinguishable from pedestrian areas, e.g. due to the choice of surfacing or lane markers, or if the layout is confusing, or if the pedestrians area is inadequate for the numbers of people using the space. Pedestrians may easily stray into the cycle lanes without realising they have done so.

Potential hazards arise where the cycle lane is bidirectional on the "wrong" side of the road, in which case the pedestrian crossing the cycle lane may look in the wrong direction, and at crossings where traffic lights apply to vehicles on the carriageway but not to the cycle lane.

Although cyclists pose a risk to pedestrians, the risk for pedestrians is minor. In the United Kingdom, from 2012 to 2016, 2,120 pedestrians were killed by a vehicle; 0.8% of these involved a bicycle and 66% involved a car.

== Other infrastructure ==
=== Street lighting ===
Furthermore, the presence of street lighting on rural roads reduced the rate of cyclists' injuries by half.

== Perceptions of safety ==
A high perception of safety is important in determining modal choice, particularly for parents.

A 1999 study by John Franklin in Milton Keynes found that cyclists perceived redways (shared use paths which criss-cross the city) to be more safe than grid or local roads (only 37% viewed grid roads as safe), but less secure, less well maintained, less well lit and more difficult to find your way.

A 2015 study involved a survey of cyclists in a street in Toronto, Canada. Results reported 38% would use other travel modes than cycling before the construction of cycle tracks (to replace painted bike lanes). An improvement to safety was the most commonly cited reason for this modal shift.

== Health benefits ==
In addition, it has been shown that in western countries the health benefits of regular cycling significantly outweigh the risks due to traffic danger. Therefore, notwithstanding their effect on crashes and injuries, measures that promote cycling should produce an overall societal health benefit.

Dutch analysts have argued as a statistical exercise that given that three times as many cyclists as car occupants are injured in collisions, and that cars harm about three times the number of other road users that bicycles do, in situations where casualties due to car traffic predominate, increasing the number of cycling journeys and reducing the number of car journeys will reduce the total number of casualties

With the number of cyclists growing due to the bike paths, it would create less pollution in the air, reducing health problems such as asthma, especially for those most at risk such as children.

== See also ==
- Bicycle safety
- Bikeway controversies
- Cyclability
- Cycling infrastructure
