= Monstertrack alleycat =

Annual alleycat race held in New York City

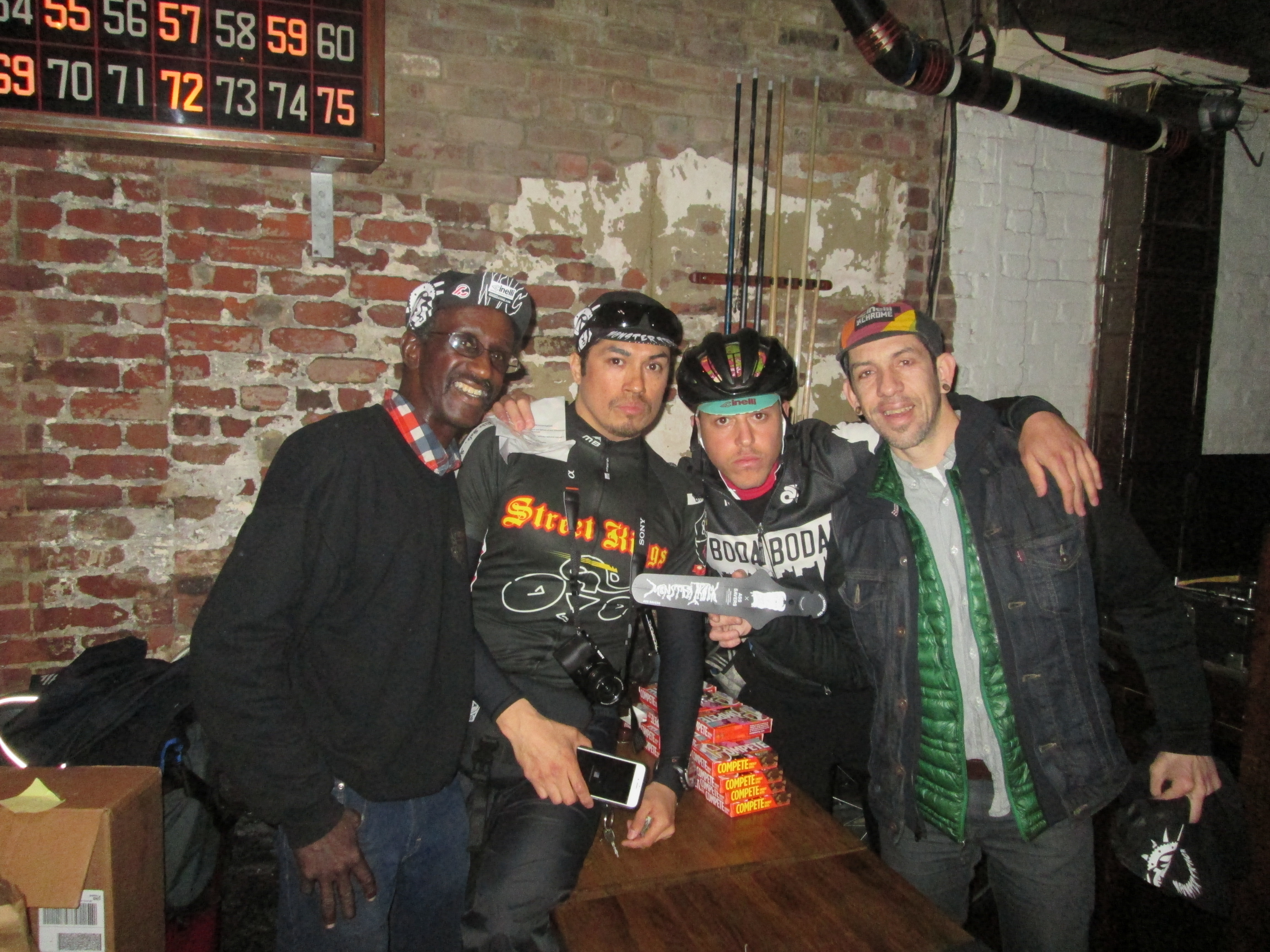
Racers and organizers of the Monster Track annual alleycat race in New York City. Pictured (L-R)ː Kurt Boone, JC Ramirez, Alfred Bobe, Chris Thormann.

Monstertrack (also Monster Track) is an alleycat race held annually in New York City. The race is exclusively for riders on brakeless, fixed-gear bicycles. The event gained popularity along with that of the use of track and fixed-gear bicycles on urban streets in the 2000s.

== History of Monstertrack ==
Monstertrack started in the early 2000s and takes place annually in mid-March. The first Monstertrack was conceived by a messenger known as "Snake."

Carlos "Diablo" and Victor Ouma "Freeway" worked as bike couriers, but took on roles of race organizers, and also participated in alleycat races. The pair made the alleycat scene in New York more popular by using the internet to spread the word about bike racing in New York. Monstertrack is billed as the largest alleycat in the U.S., attracting racers from Europe and Japan.

Monster Track History
Race Date	Race Num
2000	1
March 10, 2012	13
March 14, 2013	14
March 15, 2015	15
	16
	17
March 18	18
	19
	20
	21
	22
February 26	23
	24
	25
	26

== Cancellation of 2008 Monstertrack ==
Following the death of Matt Manger-Lynch, killed while participating in an alleycat in Chicago, the organizers of Monstertrack announced that the alleycat, scheduled as part of the Monstertrack event, had been cancelled.
