= Path racer =

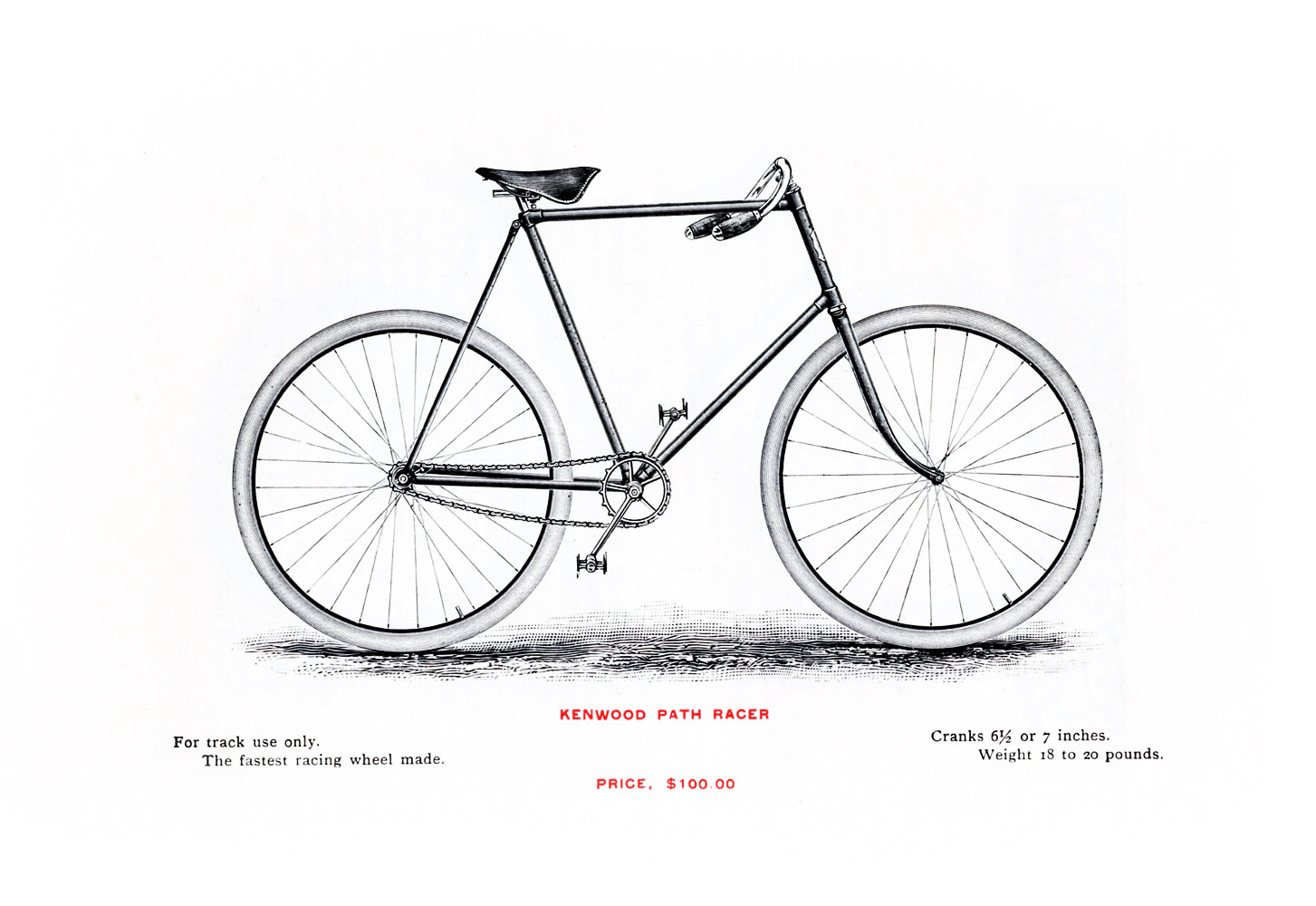
1895 tall frame Kenwood Path Racer cycle

A path racer is a hybrid bicycle designed for road and track cycling. Path is the old-fashioned Victorian/Edwardian cycling term for track. So a path bike is purely for the track and a path racer is essentially a track bike with road geometry and 32 mm Course to 38–40 mm Demi-Balloon tyres used originally on unpaved roads as well as track. Path racers are characterized by a high bottom bracket and track ends that are dual-purpose for both road and track racing and use 120 mm spacing for the rear hub, which may be fixed-gear or single-speed coaster brake, with frame angles not quite as steep and bottom bracket lower than a pure path (track bike). Normally, the front fork crown is drilled for a brake. They can also be built with mudguard clearances and mudguard eyes. They run on 28-inch (635 mm) rims. Another term for path racer is Road-Path or Road-Track.

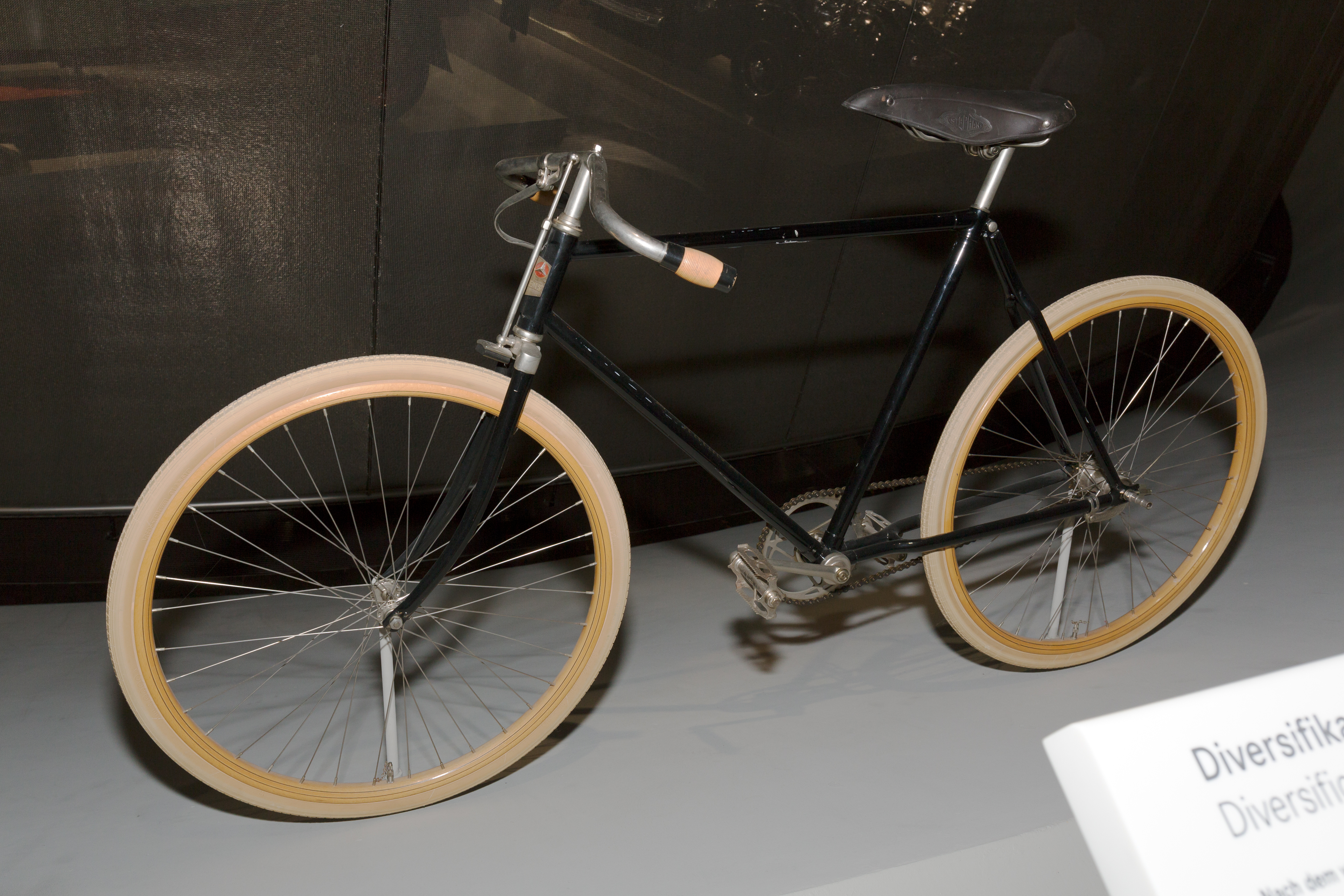
1924–1926 Mercedes-Benz path racer

== See also ==
- Outline of cycling
- Road bicycle
- Roadster
- Track bicycle
