= Single-speed bicycle =

Type of bicycle with a single gear ratio

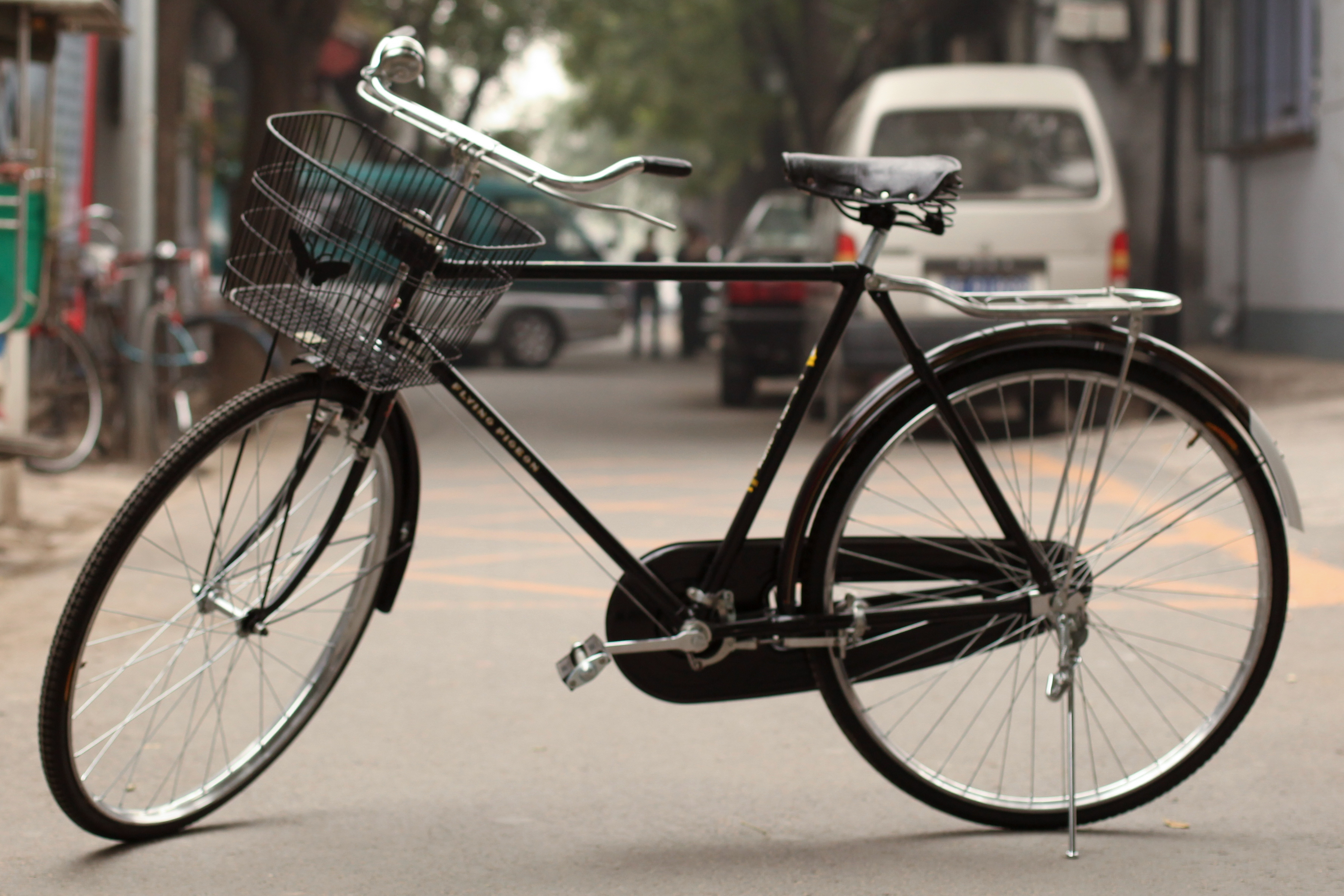
The Flying Pigeon PA-02, a single-speed utility bicycle, is the most produced bicycle model in history.

A single-speed bicycle is a type of bicycle with a single gear ratio. These bicycles are without derailleur gears, hub gearing or other methods for varying the gear ratio of the bicycle.

There are many types of modern single speed bicycles; BMX bicycles, most bicycles designed for children, cruiser type bicycles, classic commuter bicycles, unicycles, bicycles designed for track racing, fixed-gear road bicycles, and single-speed mountain and cyclocross bikes.

Although most fixed-gear bicycles (fixies) are technically single speed, the term single-speed generally refers to a single gear ratio bicycle with a freewheel mechanism to allow it to coast.

== Vis-à-vis multi-speed bicycles ==
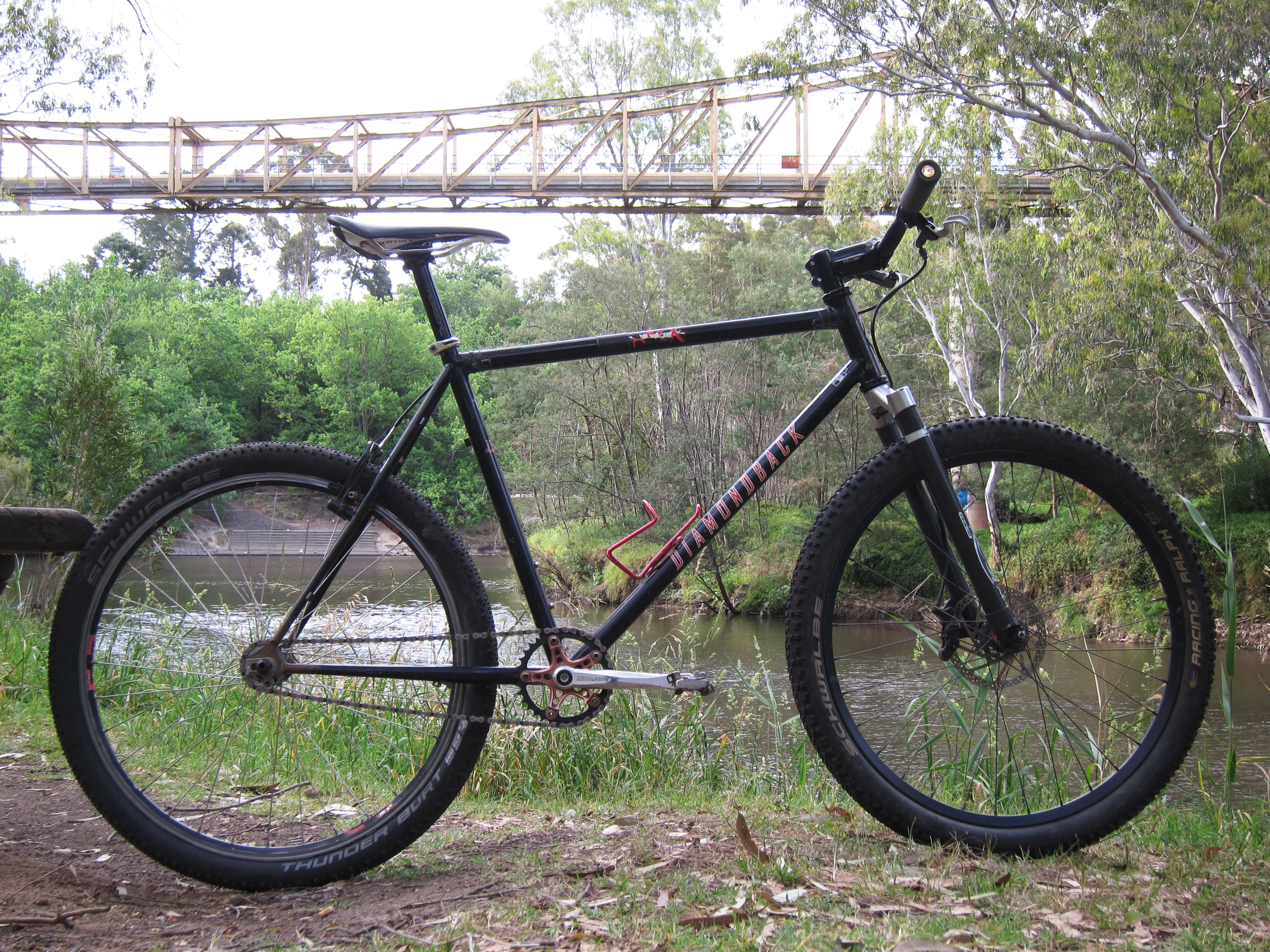
A single-speed mountain bike. The frame was modified by replacing the rear drop-outs with track fork ends to allow the chain to be tensioned.

=== Advantages ===
A single-speed bicycle is generally cheaper, lighter, and mechanically simpler than its multi-geared equivalent. Without derailleurs or other gearing systems, there are fewer parts on the bicycle that require maintenance, making this type of cycle useful for city commuting in all weather. The drivetrain efficiency of a single-speed can be greater than today's typical multi-geared bicycles. A straight chainline, lack of chain drag from rear derailleur jockey pulleys, and lack of chainrings, ramps and pins all improve efficiency. As a single rear cog takes less space than the typical seven to twelve cogs present on most multi-geared rear cassettes, rear wheels can be built with little or no dish.

=== Disadvantages ===
As the single-speed bicycle lacks alternative gearing ratios, it is less versatile, as it cannot be pedaled efficiently outside of its single gearing range. Without lower gearing options, the single speed bicycle is generally more difficult to pedal uphill. Conversely, its dedicated gear ratio also limits top speed, and is slower than a multi-geared bicycle on flat or descending terrain once bicycle speed exceeds the rider's ability to maintain continuing increases in cadence (pedaling revolutions per minute), typically 85–110 rpm. Compared to a fixed-gear bicycle, a singlespeed is easier to ride downhill and around corners (the inside pedal can be kept up to avoid grounding). However, it does not help the rider pedal around the dead centres like a fixed gear, nor does it allow the fine speed control or easy trackstands that a fixed gear permits. The pawls of a dirty and unmaintained freewheel can also clog, leaving the rider with no drive; this is impossible on a "fixie".

== Types of single-speed bicycles ==
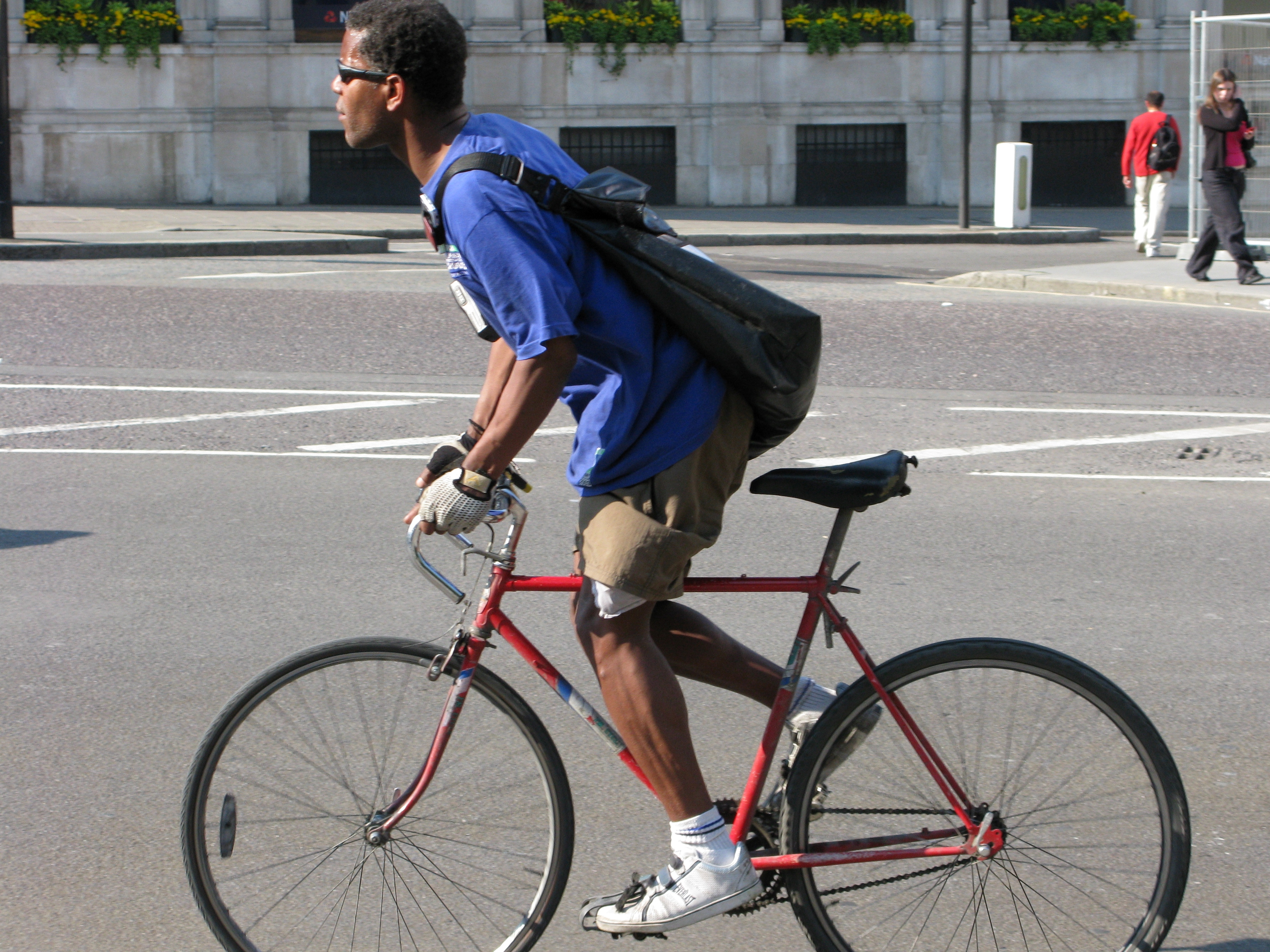
Racing bicycle, once equipped with multiple gears and derailleurs, converted to single speed. Note the semi-horizontal drop-outs, and redundant second chainring.

While track bicycles are always single speed, mountain bicycles, road bicycles, cyclo-cross bicycles, and hybrid bicycles can be made as or changed into a single speed. Mountain bike single speeds designed for trail riding often have a relatively low, or easy and slow, gear ratio. This allows them to climb hills and deal with obstacles and gradients better. This typically requires the rider to be more fit or skilled than the average rider in order to traverse the same terrain. Single speed bicycles designed for road riding typically have higher, or harder and faster, gear ratios.

Single speed bicycles and fixed-gear bicycles are popular with bicycle messengers for their reliability and durability. Depending on the situation, a messenger may prefer a mountain bike based single-speed, which can roll over many obstacles, or a fast and light road bike-based single-speed.

In the United States market, bicycle companies such as Bianchi, Cannondale, Fuji Bike, KHS, Kona, Raleigh, Giant, Specialized, Swobo, Felt, Trek and Niner all have produced and marketed single speed bicycles.

Because most full suspension frame designs either have a single pivot that is not concentric with the bottom bracket, or a linkage with a variable center of rotation, the distance between the bottom bracket and rear axle varies throughout the suspension's travel. This requires a sprung chain tensioner, similar to a rear derailleur, to be used. Only relatively uncommon frame designs with single pivots that are concentric with the bottom bracket allow the use of more desirable static chain tensioners. Another consideration is the generally increased amount of pedalling while standing up that is inherent to single speed mountain biking, which increases losses from suspension bob and squat. Therefore, full suspension mountain bikes are fairly rare, with hardtails and rigid bikes being much more common.

== Chain tensioning ==
Single-speed bicycle builders have devised a variety of methods for producing and maintaining the proper chain tension. The most common method is horizontal rear dropouts or track ends. These allow the rear wheel to be moved fore or aft as necessary. Using chain tugs with track ends ensures that optimum chain tension can be achieved with the wheel remaining centered. A similar design, sliding dropouts, uses detachable dropouts that are bolted to the frame through horizontal slots. This allows both quick release or bolt on hubs to be used, or through-axle hubs with the appropriate dropouts. Sliding dropouts usually have set screws that bear on the front of them through the frame to adjust their position for tensioning and wheel alignment. The main advantage of sliding dropouts over track ends is realized when they are used with disc brakes, as the brake caliper mount is part of the left dropout, and thus moves with the dropout, maintaining the hub to caliper distance. Sliding dropouts can also include a derailleur hanger if multi-speed use is desired.

Another method uses an eccentric mechanism either in the bottom bracket or in the rear hub. If neither of these are an option, when working with an existing frame not originally designed for single-speed use for example, some kind of idler pulley, such as the Surly Singleator or simply a short cage rear derailleur can be used to take up chain slack. As well, finetuning the combination of chainring, cog, and chain length may suffice until the chain develops significant wear.

Throughout the years bicycle designers have produced belt-driven bicycles. While these belts cannot be shifted between gears like a chain, they offer singlespeed or hub geared drivetrains with improved increased wear resistance, quieter operation, and lubrication-free cleanliness. Belts also do not change length during their lifespan in the same way that chains "stretch" or increase in pitch as their link pivots wear. This keeps the pitch of the belt's teeth constant and dramatically decreases wear on gear teeth. Belts have failed to overtake chains in popularity for bicycles because they have historically been less efficient. Also replacement of the one-piece belt requires traditional diamond bicycle frames to have a split chainstay or seatstay.

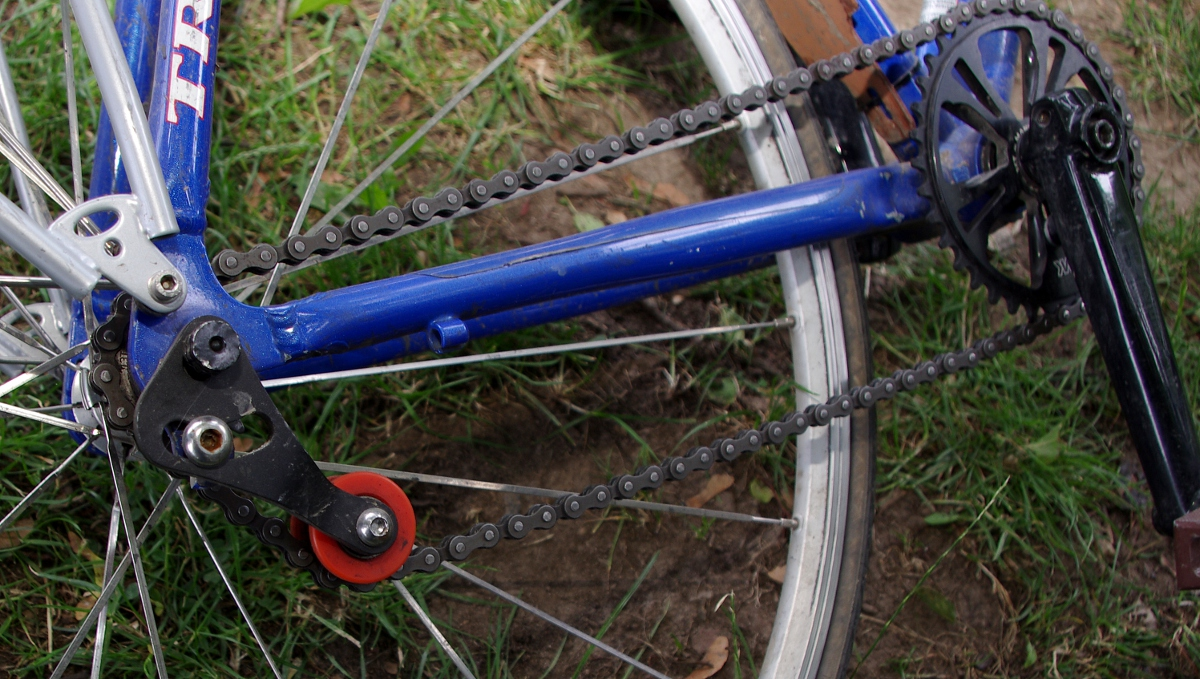
Spring-loaded chain tensioner

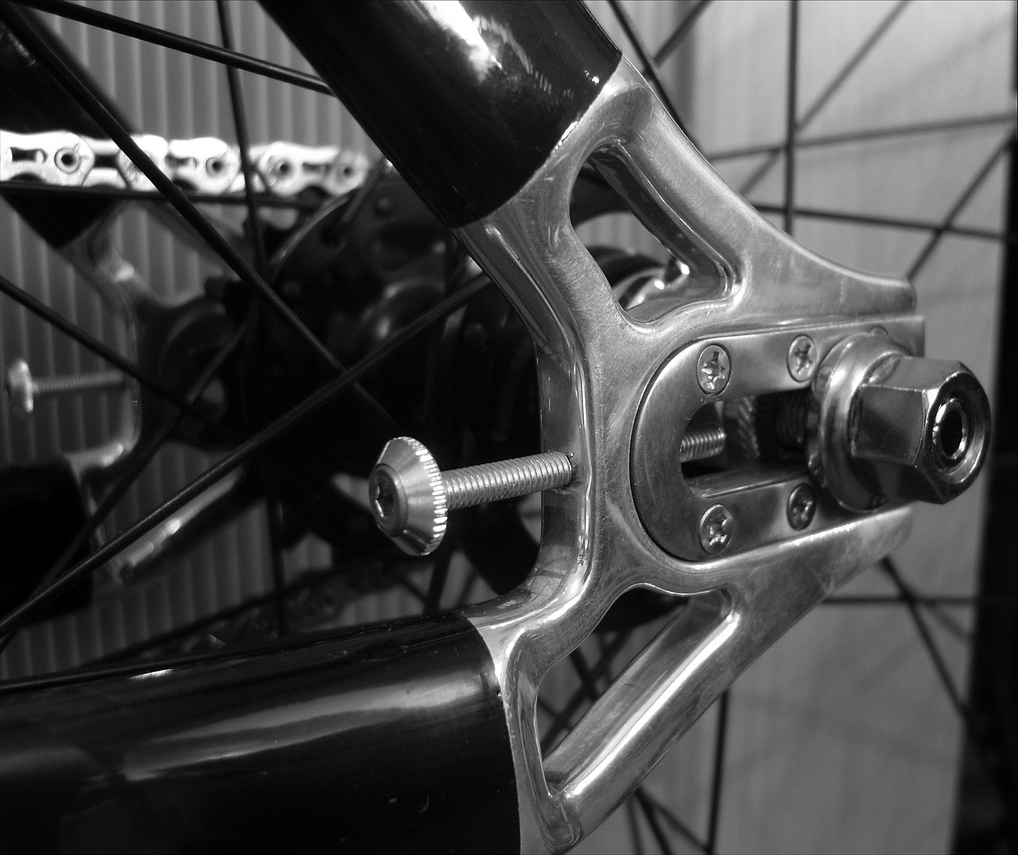
Fixed-position chain tensioner

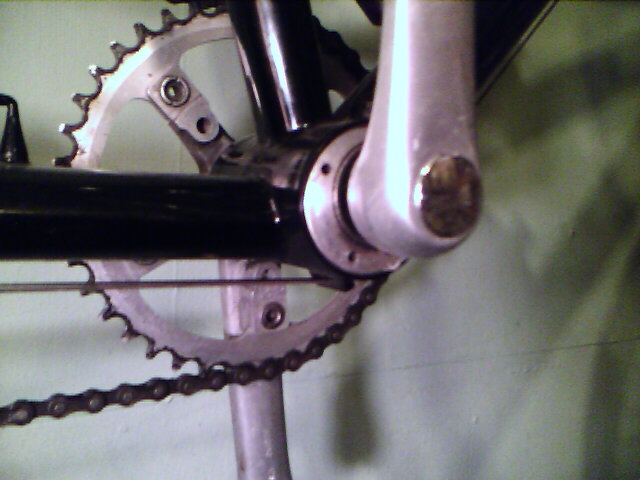
Eccentric bottom bracket

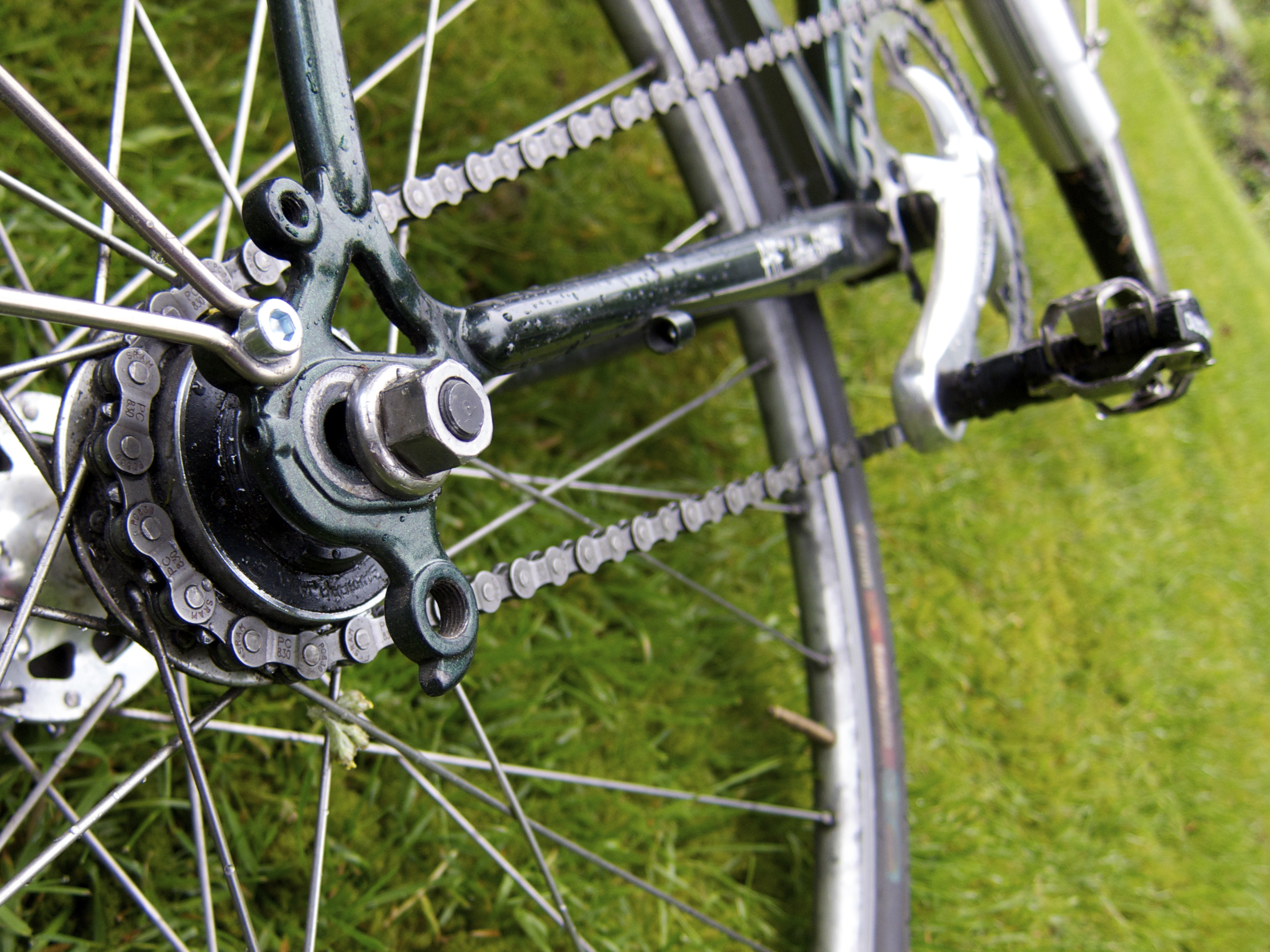
Chain tensioned without a dedicated tensioner mechanism

== Single-speed cycle conversions ==
Single-speed bicycle builders have converted many former multi-geared cycles into single or fixed gear through the removal of the derailleurs and associated hardware. The simplest conversion uses the existing freewheel/cassette and crankset, the chain being cut to fit the desired gear ratio. However this retains unnecessary weight and the chainline will most likely not be perfect. A more thorough conversion will involve replacing the freewheel with a single-speed one, and re-dishing the rear wheel. On bicycles with vertical dropouts, a chain tensioner is often required to allow the correct tension on the resulting shorter chain.

A very popular "off road" mountain bike gearing, for the 26″ wheel size, is 39:18, approximately a 2:1 gear ratio and 56.35 gear inches, for versatile trail riding. A great "on road" gear ratio, for the 26″ wheel, is 42:17, approximately a 2.5:1 ratio and 64.2 gear inches for versatile tour riding. Many British enthusiasts used to tour on 27–inch–wheeled lightweights on a single fixed–gear of 69 inches before multi–speed gearing became universally popular, though this certainly made for tough work.

A reasonable "road" gear ratio, for the 700 × 28c wheel size a, is 46:17, approximately a 2.7:1 ratio and 71.75 gear inches, for very versatile asphalt riding, and a better lifespan with good road duty.

Fixed-gear setups work especially well with higher 40s chainrings, so the rotation ratio is closer to a wider 3:1, avoiding the tighter ratios, which will spin too fast, especially when descending steep hills.

Note that the larger diameter gear and chain ring, clearly, offers the best longevity, with much better wear characteristics than smaller gear and chain ring sets and less rounding of the teeth, over time.

== Flip-flop hubs ==
Flip-flop, or double-sided hubs are threaded on both sides. Usually one side has a track-type threading (with lock ring), and the other side is threaded for a single-speed standard freewheel. It is possible to find them with track threading on both sides, but not easily. The cyclist can then change gears manually by reversing the drive wheel.

The usual way to use a flip-flop hub is to have a fixed gear on one side, and a single speed freewheel on the other. Ideally, the freewheel sprocket would be one or two teeth larger than the fixed sprocket. This allows for extended hill climbs at a lower ratio than the fixed gear provides. The freewheel in this gear also allows the cyclist to coast on a steep descent.

== See also ==
- Bicycle gearing for multi-speed bicycles
- Cruiser bicycle
- Cycle speedway
- Fixed-gear bicycle
- Keirin
- Outline of cycling
