= Adventures for the Cure =

Nonprofit organization and USA Cycling club

- Founded: 2005
- Founder: Adam Driscoll, Patrick Blair
- Tax ID no.: EIN 03-0607998
- Purpose: diabetes
- Region served: United States, Kenya
- Website: adventuresforthecure.com

Adventures for the Cure (AFC) is a nonprofit organization and USA Cycling club that exists to raise awareness for diabetes and other selected charities. Formed in 2005, AFC is based in Halethorpe, Maryland, near Baltimore.

== History and mission ==
According to the organization's website, AFC was founded by two University of Maryland Baltimore County (UMBC) classmates, Adam Driscoll (Type 1 diabetic) and Patrick Blair, to show those diagnosed with diabetes and their families how leading a healthy and active lifestyle can move them beyond their perceived limits, and to raise funds for diabetes research.

The organization also raises awareness and funds for other causes that the board of directors has selected. In the past AFC has raised funds for the following organizations:

- American Diabetes Association
- Juvenile Diabetes Research Foundation
- Kupenda for the Children - focused on children disabilities in Kenya
- Blood:Water- focused on HIV/AIDS and water crises in Africa
- PSC Partners Seeking a Cure - focused on Primary Sclerosing Cholangitis

== Documentary film ==
In 2006, AFC developed a documentary film, Adventures for the Cure: The Doc, narrated by three-time Tour de France winner Greg LeMond, which chronicled a 6,500-mile trek across the United States on fixed-gear, single speed bicycles by Adam Driscoll, Patrick Blair, Jesse Stump and their support crew. The film, directed and edited by Philip Knowlton, founder of videe-o's, was awarded the People's Choice Award at the 2008 Beloit International Film Festival and was an Official Selection at the 2008 Bicycle Film Festival. The documentary is popular amongst avid cyclists and has been shown at events such as the Tour of Missouri.

== Competitive racing ==
In addition to regional road, mountain bike, and cross country racing, AFC members compete in ultra-endurance events. In 2008, AFC competed in the four-man division (again using fixed gears) in Race Across America (RAAM). In 2009, Adam Driscoll and Pat Blair captured first place in the two-man division of RAAM by completing the 3021 mile event in 7 days, 1 hour and 33 minutes; averaging 17.82 mph over the journey.
