= Freestyle fixed gear =

Cycle sport

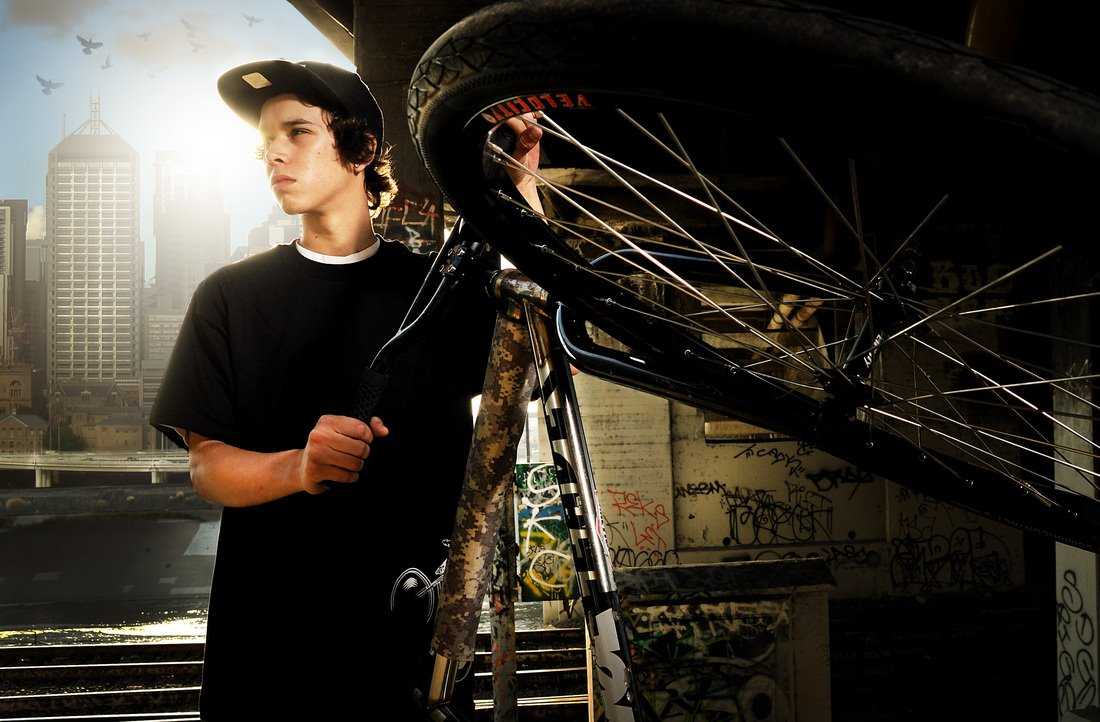
- Michael Chacon
- Nicknames: FGFS, Trick Track, Tarck

Characteristics
- Type: Cycling
- Equipment: fixed gear bicycle

Presence
- Country or region: Worldwide

Freestyle fixed gear is stunt riding on a fixie. It is an extreme sport where the stunts share elements from BMX, artistic cycling, dirt jumping, and trials. The flat ground style of tricks, similar to artistic cycling and flatland bmx, is called Trick-Track or Tarck. Street and park riding, that is more similar to BMX, is generally called FGFS (Fixed Gear Freestyle).

== History ==
Freestyle fixed gear riders style can be generally described as doing "BMX-style tricks on their fixed-gear bikes". The sport was "born from the fusion of freestyle BMX and track cycling". As early as 2007 people "started to see how rad they could get on a track bike, it started with skids and progressed from there." Fixed gear tricks are very impressive because they require riders to always be pedaling. A 2015 poll of international fixed gear riders found that 11.9% report the use of fixie for tricks.

The earliest bicycle tricks were done on fixed-gear bicycles, with motion pictures evidence as early as 1899. However, most modern disciplines of freestyle cycling utilize a freewheel type mechanism; a notable exception is artistic cycling riders also still uses a fixed-gear bicycle. The fixed connection between rider and wheel enables stunts that are difficult or impossible with a freewheel. The most basic trick called a trackstand is generally done only by riders on fixed-gear bikes.

Bicycle messenger culture in the late 20th century and early 21st century is a major influence to freestyle on fixed-gear bikes. Fixed gears date to the mid-19th century, and bike messengers in New York have long found them to be dependable and practical machines for tough city streets. But it is only in the past few years that riders, inspired mostly by skateboarding and BMX, began to push the limits of doing tricks on a fixed-gear bike. The sport has mostly stayed underground, however, the mainstream Hollywood movies Quicksilver (1986) and Premium Rush (2012) contain stunts done by bicycle messenger characters using a fixed-gear bicycle "showing off stunts and deviant riding".

Tricks done on a fixed-gear bicycle appear in the movies Rad and Pee-wee's Big Adventure. Red Bull held an annual fixed freestyle competition from 2011 to 2014. Specialized offered a fixed gear freestyle specific bike called the P.Fix. In the 2001 X Games Trevor Myer used a direct drive bmx to compete in flatland freestyle.The freestyle fixed gear blog SMC listed the top 100 riders from the late 2000's until 2026.

== Equipment ==
=== Bikes ===
Freestyle fixed gear bikes typically have 26" or 700c wheels and are strengthened and optimized for tricks. Trick Track bikes are typically 700c size frames, with geometry that resembles track bikes. Important features on a Trick Track bike is adequate clearance to spin the bars during tricks and ability to fit wider tires. Bar-spin clearance can be measured by finding the closest distance the front tire gets to the pedal; alternatively, the distance from the bottom bracket center to the front axle center (front-center), with bars forward and backward can be measured and compared to a known good baseline. FGFS bikes are typically 26" and resemble a large bmx bike. Important features on an FGFS bike is a bottom bracket height that allows double peg grinds on obstacles like handrails. FGFS frames typically accommodate larger 14mm axle for maximum strength.

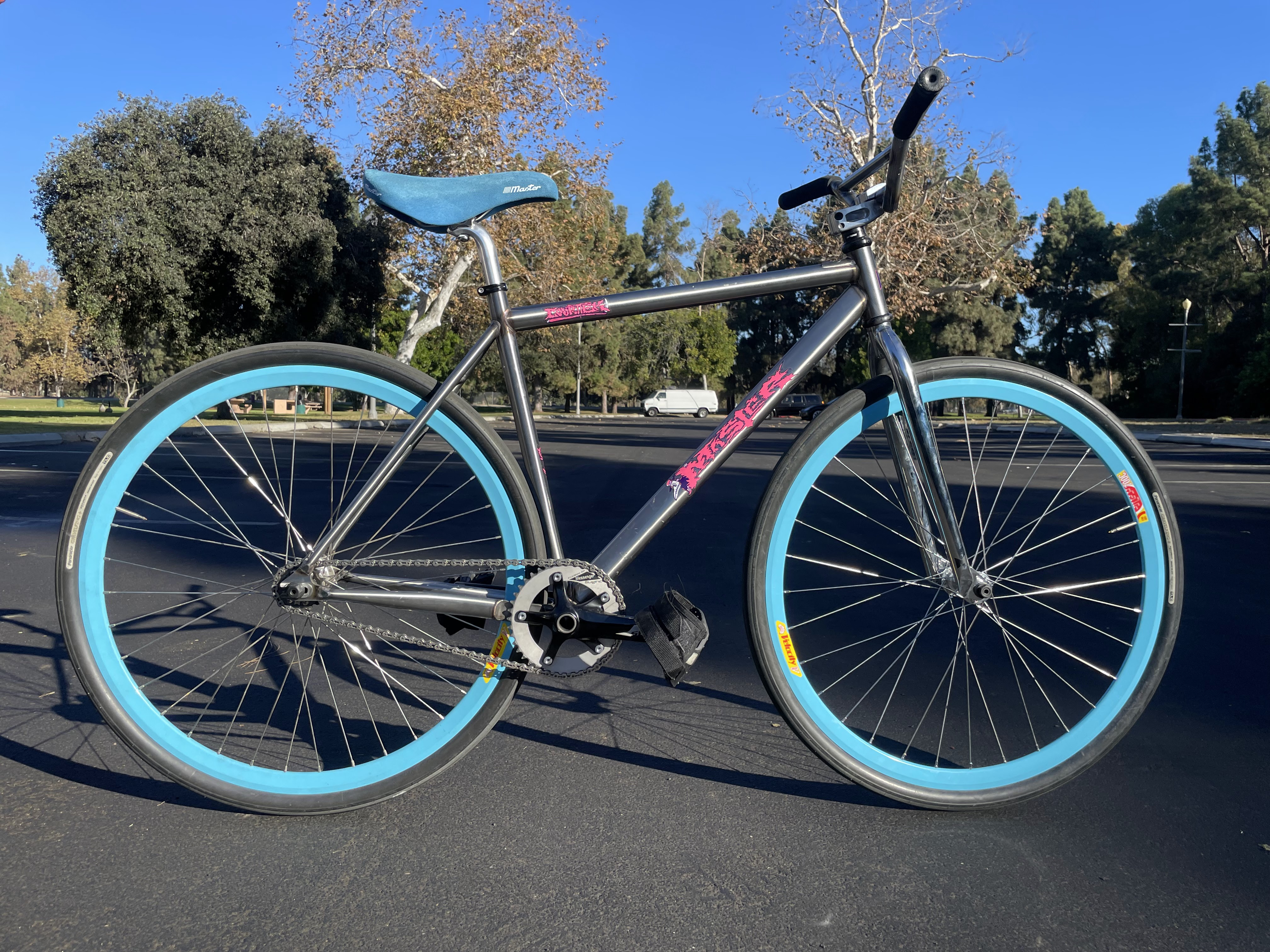
Typical example of a 700C fixed gear bike for Trick Track

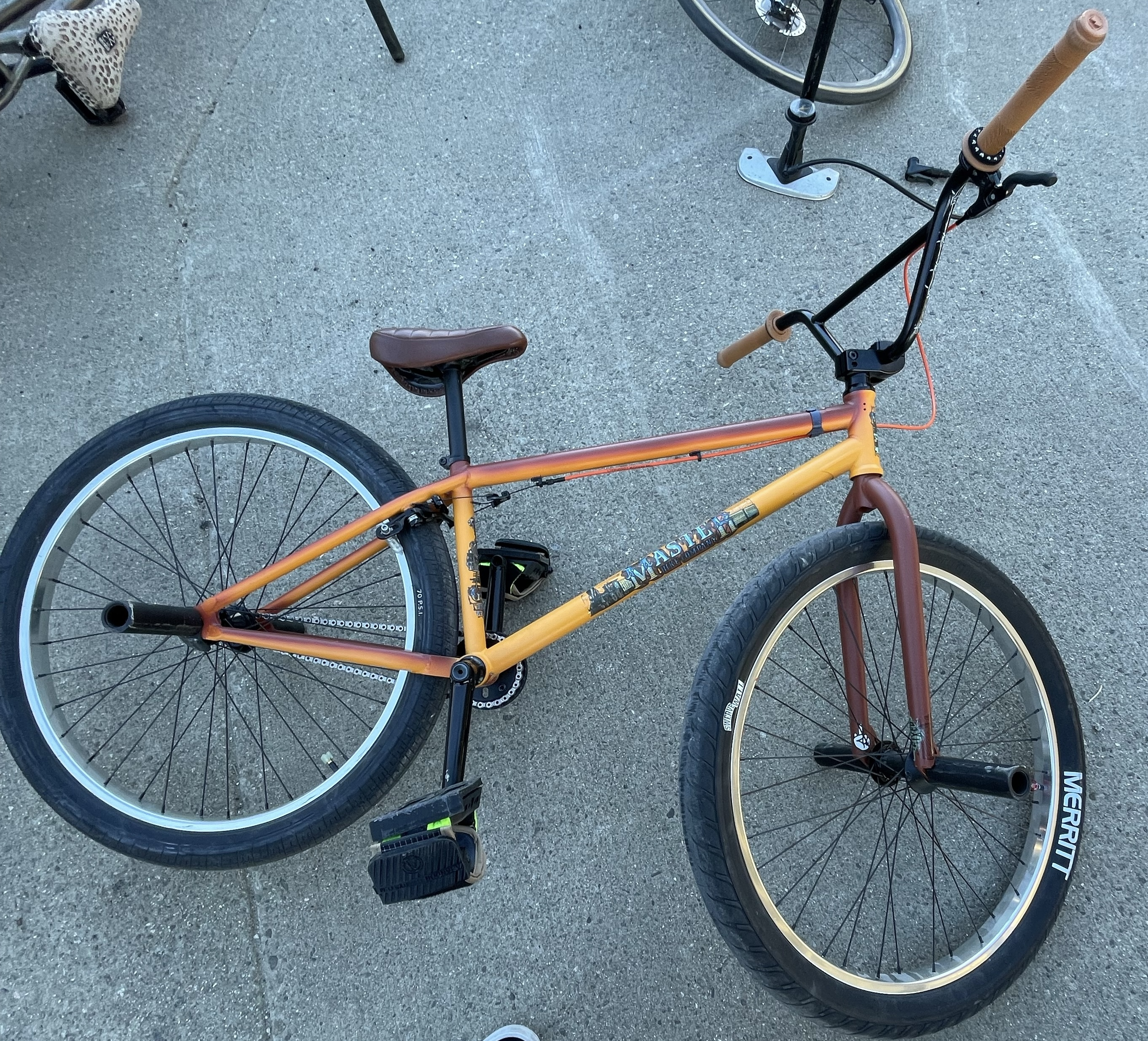
Typical example of 26" FGFS bike

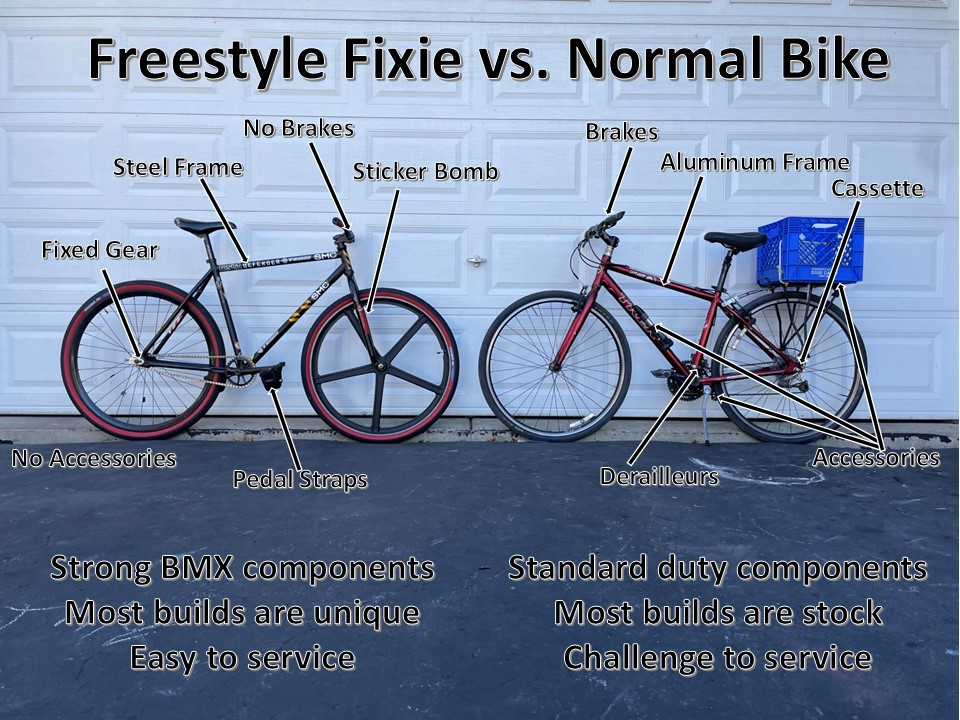
Visual differences between Freestyle Fixie and Normal Bike

== Tricks ==
| Trick Name | Description | Examples |
|---|---|---|
| Track Stand | The act of balancing motionless on a bicycle is called a "track stand". | Johnathan Ball |
| Wheelie | Front wheel comes off the ground. Since the pedals are always moving on a fixie, the manual isn't possible in freestyle fixed gear like it is in BMX. | Tyler Johnson death truck wheelie |
| Fakie | aka "Riding backwards". The rider uses fixed gear drive train to ride bike backwards. | Johnathan Ball.; Niedert starts first bike trick movie with a fakie |
| Skid | The rider locks the rear wheel by using pressure on the pedals or straps. | Johnathan Ball demonstrates various skids; MASH SF. (2007); MACAFRAMA (2009) |
| Pogo | Hop up and down on the back wheel. | Johnathan Ball |
| Pole Dance | Doing a wheelie, take a hand off to grab an obstacle to go in a circle around. | Johnathan Ball |
| Keo Spin | From rolling backward, taking off one arm to get momentum into a back wheel spin. Named after Keo Curry. | Johnathan Ball |
| Fish and Chips | aka Fishy Whip. Fakie slider while holding the saddle. Invented by Dylan "Fish n' Chips" Hurst. | Johnathan Ball |
| Big Spin | aka Prolly Spin, Blog Spin. Back wheel spin from rolling forward. | Johnathan Ball; Keo Curry in MACAFRAMA (2009) no handed big spin called Keo Rock/Min Spin |
| Foot Plant Spin | aka Toe Keo, Tokyo, Death Spin. From rolling forward wheelie, fast foot plant to get into a back wheel spin. | Johnathan Ball |
| Surf | Riding forward with no hands while rider stands on various parts of the bike. | Matt Spencer frame surf |

== See also ==
- Aggressive inline skating
- Cycling
- Street skateboarding
- Bunny hop (cycling)
- Glossary of cycling
- Freeride
- Freestyle motocross
- Freestyle scootering
