= Alleycat race =

Unsanctioned biking competition

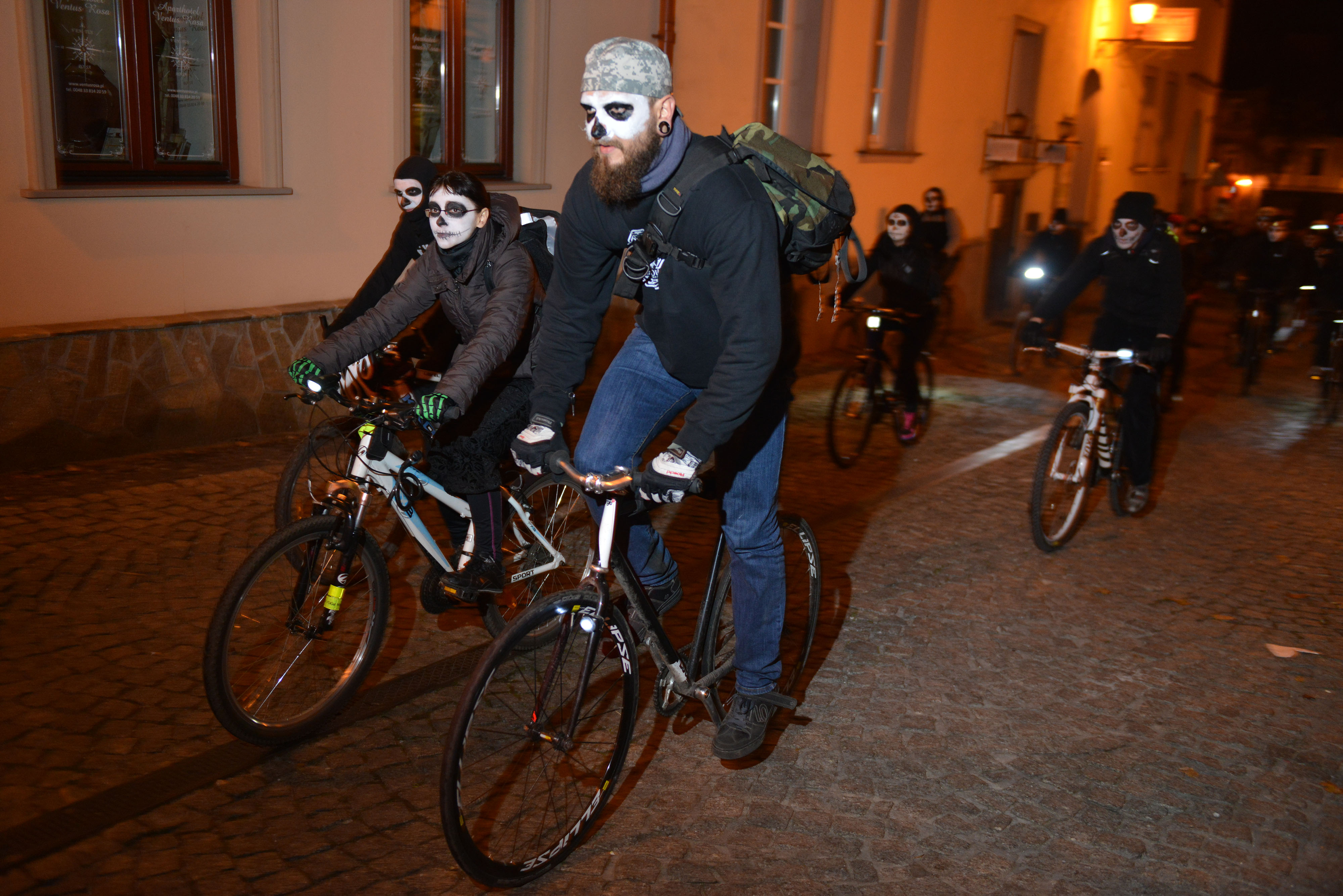
Race in Mexican All Saints Day style, Poland, 2014

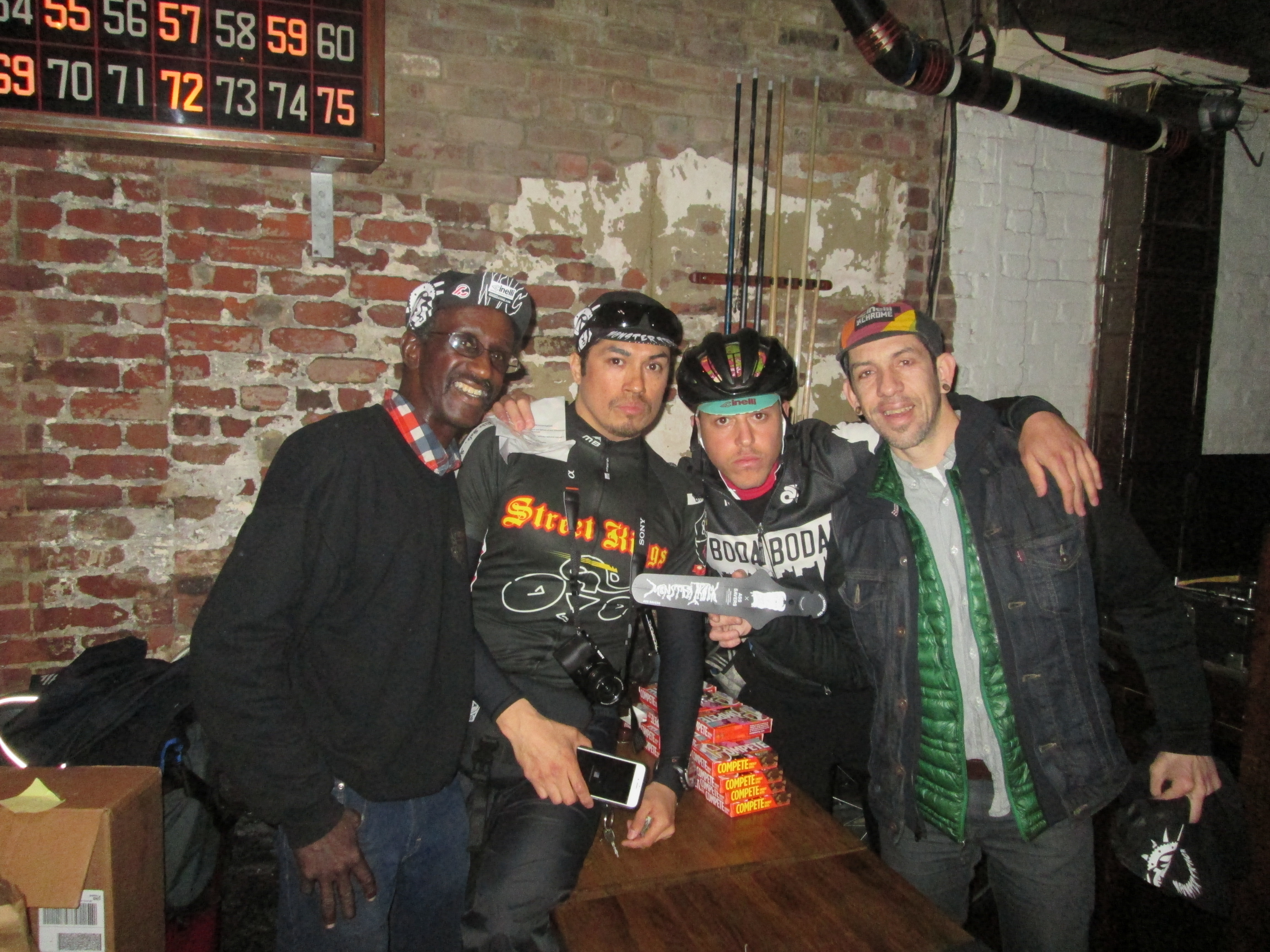
Racers and organizers of the Monster Track annual Alleycat Race in New York City

An alleycat race is an unsanctioned bicycle race. Alley cats almost always take place in cities, and are often organized by bicycle messengers. The informality of the organization is matched by the emphasis on taking part, rather than simple competition. For instance, many alleycats present prizes for the last competitor to finish (sometimes known as Dead Fucking Last or DFL).

The first race to be called an 'alley cat' was held in Toronto on 30 October 1989 and continued, in its original form, around Halloween and Valentine's Day for the following five years. In 1993, when Toronto messengers shared Alleycat stories at the first international messenger race (C.M.W.C Berlin), the name and the concept spread globally. Regularly organized Alleycats can be found in cities across North America, Europe and Asia. Many smaller cities with no cycle messenger population are also home to alleycats run by the burgeoning urban cyclist subculture.

== Race styles ==
Alley cats reflect the personality, contemporary environment and competitive interest of their organizers. Races may be extremely grueling and designed to eliminate all but the fastest and best overall messengers, or less competitive and meant to be enjoyed by the local messenger community around set holidays, such as New York City's July 4 Alleycat.

Rules vary, but include:

- Checkpoints - The first checkpoint is given at the start of the race, and on arrival the next checkpoint is revealed to the racer. These work in much the same way a messenger would be assigned deliveries over the course of a day. The route to a checkpoint is left up to the rider and showcases a messenger's knowledge of the area.
- Task checkpoints - In some races upon arriving at a checkpoint the rider may have to perform a task or trick before being given the next location. This allows organizers to be as creative as they desire. Task checkpoints can involve physical tasks, such as climbing stairs, taking a shot of alcohol or hot sauce, performing a skillful trick, or can test the racer's mind, such as reciting trivia or messenger-related knowledge. An alleycat where checkpoints involve tricks, often fixed gear, may be called "TrickCat" or "JibCat". Often there is not a task at all of the checkpoints in a race and tasks/checkpoints can sometimes be skipped (potentially at a loss of points) if a rider feels that time to complete a task is not worth the points they would earn.
- Checkpoints up front - A common format is for organizers to give the checkpoints/manifest 5–30 minutes before the start of the race. This allows the rider to choose the best route between stops.
- Point collection - Some races use a scavenger hunt style race where each stop is worth a certain number of points. These are often races of the Checkpoints Up Front variety and a rider may decide to not stop at some checkpoints valuing an earlier completion time over the points a particular stop may earn them.

Participants do not wear conventional race numbers; instead, "spoke cards", originally Tarot cards, are sometimes specially printed for the event. Participants' number is added with a marker and are then wedged between the spokes of the rear wheel. Spoke cards are often kept on the wheel by participants as a souvenir, who collect more over time.

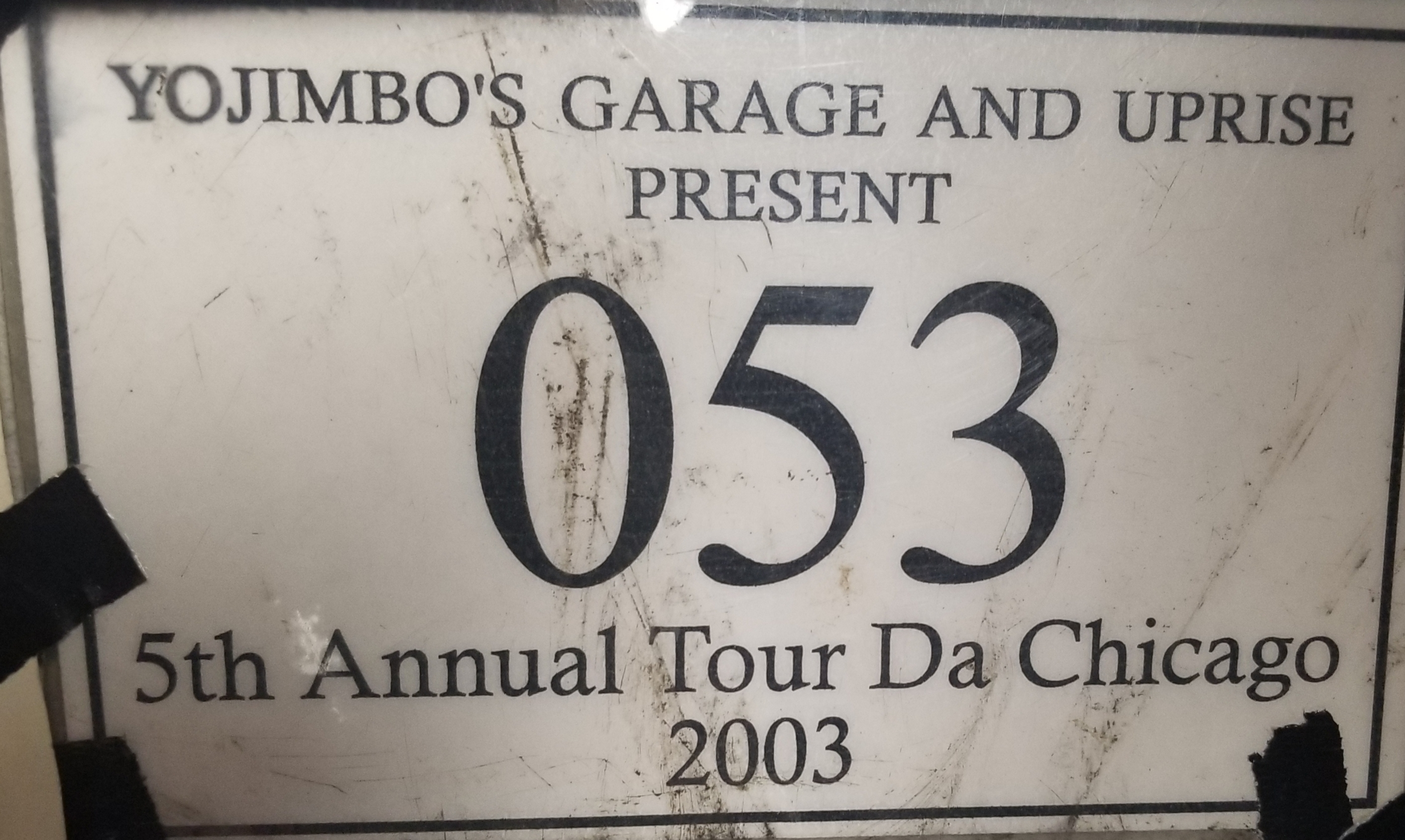
Spoke card from 2003 Tour Da Chicago

== Growth ==
Substantiating the growth of alleycat racing is difficult, given the lack of publicity and record-keeping in the community. Some themes commonly associated with alleycats, such as the use of fixed-gear bicycles, became more popular in the later half of the 2000s. The number of alleycats being organized also appears to be on the rise, as non-couriers begin to organize their own races. Events featuring alleycat racing culture have seen significant expansion since 2000. Individual races have come to embrace issues important to messengers or messenger communities, such as Boston's Allston Rat Race in August, New York City's 4/20:Hip to be Square, the Global Warming Alleycat held on the same day in Toronto, San Francisco, Mexico City, Berlin, and New York City, and Baltimore's GhettoBlaster. Meanwhile, events like the Bicycle Film Festival have expanded across dozens of cities and embraced many different expressions of alleycat-style bicycle culture. Alleycat veteran and videographer Lucas Brunelle is widely credited as having pioneered the art of filming alleycat races from the first-person perspective and sharing the footage online. YouTube currently hosts more than 1,000 videos of alleycat races, most of which have been uploaded since 2006.

On May 19, 2018, the first Citi Bike Race, was held in New York City. The event was an alleycat style race where all participant rode bicycles from the city's bike sharing program, Citi Bike.

== Legality ==
In the United Kingdom, organised cycle racing on public roads requires the authority of the police and the relevant sporting organisation. However, treasure hunts and time trials are legal.

Organizers often attempt to put issues of legality in the hands of racers. The decision to break any laws is left to the individual.

== Chicago death ==
On February 24, 2008, Matt Manger-Lynch was killed in a collision with a car while participating in the 'Tour Da Chicago', a winter alleycat series. Eyewitnesses reported that he had failed to stop for a red light. Manger-Lynch's death prompted local news outlets to report on the phenomenon of alleycat races.

== See also ==
- Outline of cycling
- Mountain bike orienteering
