= Flip-flop hub =

Type of bicycle hub

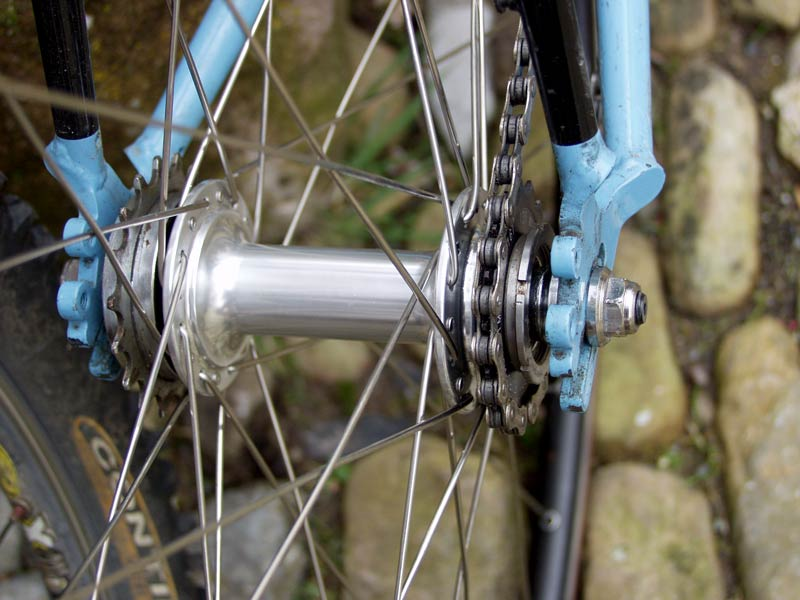
A flip-flop hub

Flip-flop hubs, also called double-sided hubs, are rear bicycle hubs that are threaded to accept fixed cogs and/or freewheels on both sides.

There are several different types of flip flop hubs available for different applications. Their main purpose is to allow changing between two (and only two) different gear ratios on one rear wheel without the added complications of a multi-gear derailleur or internal hub gear, or between fixed and freewheel options. By removing the rear wheel and turning it around, the rider can switch between the two options. They are traditionally found on track bicycles, but can also be found on other single speed bicycles.

== Types ==
=== Fixed gear/track bicycles ===
Usually, one side has a fixed type stepped threading, and the other side is threaded for a standard freewheel. Occasionally you may find double-sided fixed hubs with stepped threading on both sides, but these are rare and only a few companies offer them. The fixed side has a stepped-down diameter thread to accept a lockring. The larger diameter thread on the fixed side accepts a standard threaded cog and uses the same size threads as the freewheel side of the hub. The most common standard I.S.O. thread size is 1.375" x 24 tpi (threads per inch), but there are other less common older sizes (British 1.371" x 24 TPI, French 34.7 x 1 mm, Italian 35 mm x 24 TPI).

The smaller diameter thread on the fixed side has reverse/left-hand threads to accept a lockring. The lockring is reversely threaded to prevent the cog from coming loose when applying reverse/braking power to the pedals. There are also different sized threads for the left hand lockring (English/ISO 1.29" x 24 TPI), Campagnolo/Phil Wood (1.32" x 24 TPI) and Old French (33 mm x 1.0 mm). The first two are the most common, with the French threading being older, and a little less common. It is advisable to check with the manufacturer of the hub for lock ring compatibility. Wrong thread type lockrings may easily thread onto the wrong hub, but over time, the poorly-mating thread interface will cause the threads on the hub to become damaged or destroyed.

This allows the installation of a cog (or freewheel) on one side of the hub, and another (cog or freewheel) on the other side of the same hub. Reversing the rear wheel allows switching between Fixed/Free drivetrain, between two different size gears, or both. Generally, the freewheel is selected to be the same size, or slightly larger (more teeth) than the fixed cog. The same size allows the same gearing, but with coasting option, while a slightly larger freewheel gear allows coasting and easier pedaling for longer or hilly rides. Both could also be freewheels for two different coasting gear selections. Any two different size cogs/freewheels can be used as long as they are within the fitting limits dictated by the length of the frame's dropout slots, and the chain length. Large differences in the number of teeth may require addition or removal of chain links to achieve a proper fit. Also, if rear brakes are used (essential where a freewheel is used) brake pads may need to be adjusted.

The ISO threading for freewheels (Single or Multiple Speed) is the same as for track/fixed cogs. A standard single-speed BMX style freewheel can be used on the track threads of the hub. Because of the stepped down lock ring threads, not as many threads of the freewheel engage the hub threads as they would if it were threaded to a freewheel thread, however, this is not a problem since the same number of threads is sufficient to secure a track cog. The force applied to a freewheel is the same as that applied to a fixed cog of the same size, so the missing threads cause no durability issue. Also, a freewheel never imposes reverse torque on the threads, so a freewheel puts less strain on the threads than a fixed cog does.

Fixed cogs are generally available in a range of sizes from 12T to 23T (number of teeth) and two different widths - for 3/32" and 1/8" chain (thickness of chain teeth). The 3/32" size is made to accommodate narrower 3/32" chains but is also compatible with 1/8" and wider BMX/single speed chains. The thicker 1/8" cogs are ONLY compatible with 1/8" or wider single speed chains. There may be larger (number of teeth) sizes available as well, either custom manufactured or adapted from chain wheels or front sprockets using a number of methods or devices. There are some heavy-duty 3/16" chains designed for BMX use which are compatible with most cogs. However, because these chains usually have taller thicker side plates, they may not work properly with some cogs smaller than 11T or freewheels smaller than 16T.

Freewheels are available in sizes 13T to 28T and in the same two different widths as the cogs (3/32" and 1/8"). ACS makes a special "FAT" heavy duty BMX freewheel in 14T and 16T with 3/16" teeth compatible only with 3/16" chains. ACS also makes a 15T freewheel that accepts a 3/32" chain.

=== BMX/Single Speed Bicycles ===
There are a few different variations of flip-flop hubs for BMX bikes that are different from the track style. The most common type of BMX flip flop hub has standard ISO freewheel threads on one side and smaller metric BMX threads (30 mm x 1 mm) on the other side that are designed to work with smaller 14T to 15T BMX freewheels. In recent years a few companies have started making 13T freewheels compatible with this thread as well, allowing more gearing options.

In recent years, an innovation in BMX freestyle riding spawned "Left Side Drive". This component option switches the drivetrain to the left side of the bike in order to move the sprocket and chain out of harms way for riders who prefer to do grinding tricks using the pegs or pedal on the right side of the bike. Moving the drivetrain to the left side required modification to the design of three components.

1. A freewheel with left hand threads which threads on and ratchets in the opposite direction for use on the left side.
2. A rear hub with left hand threads to accept the LH freewheel.
3. A left side drive crank arm. Although you could simply reverse a normal set of crank arms, the left side and right side specific pedal bosses would be reversed, causing them to tend to come loose and spin out with normal riding. Also, directional pedals would look backwards unless the pedal spindles were also reversed. Many companies now provide cranksets in which both arms are designed to be drive arms with the appropriate sprocket drive bosses. While this application to BMX is new, this is not a new idea. For decades, tandem bicycles have used left side drive cranks to drive the timing chain.

Left side drive introduced a different type of flip flop hub for BMX. This hub is a Right Hand/Left Hand flip flop hub. One side of the hub allows the use of normal right hand freewheels, while the other side is threaded with left hand threads (1.375" x 24L tpi) and accepts the new left hand drive freewheels. The first/most common was the ACS South Paw Claw model, available in 16T. Later, a version of this hub was made with small metric BMX (30 mm x 1 mm) threads, left hand on one side and right hand on the other side. These hubs accepted either Left or right side drive freewheels in the smaller 13T-15T sizes.

DK Bicycles introduced the Dual Drive hub back in the early 2000s which is a BMX Left/Right drive flip flop hub with the smaller sized metric (30 mm x 1 mm) BMX threads for 13T-15T freewheels, but also includes two threaded adapters, one left and one right, threaded inside to match the smaller metric threads and threaded on the outside with standard ISO threads. This allows the hub to use any size or combination of left and right drive freewheels available. Other companies like Wethepeople also made these dual-threaded metric hubs for a short time before cassette hubs enabled the use of much smaller rear cogs.

=== Drum/disk brake tandem hubs ===
A third type of flip-flop hub is rather rare and not truly a flip flop hub by design, although it can be used in that way. This type of hub has standard ISO 1.375" x 24 tpi on BOTH sides, but it was not intended for two freewheels. These were designed for the use of a drum or disc hand brake on the left side, and a multi speed freewheel on the right. The drum and disc brakes designed for early tandems used standard ISO 1.375" x 24 freewheel threads to attach the disc or drum to the hub. These tandem hubs can easily be adapted for use as single speed flip flop hubs using any combination of two ISO English threaded freewheels.
