= Fixed-gear bicycle =

Bicycle that has a drivetrain with no freewheel mechanism

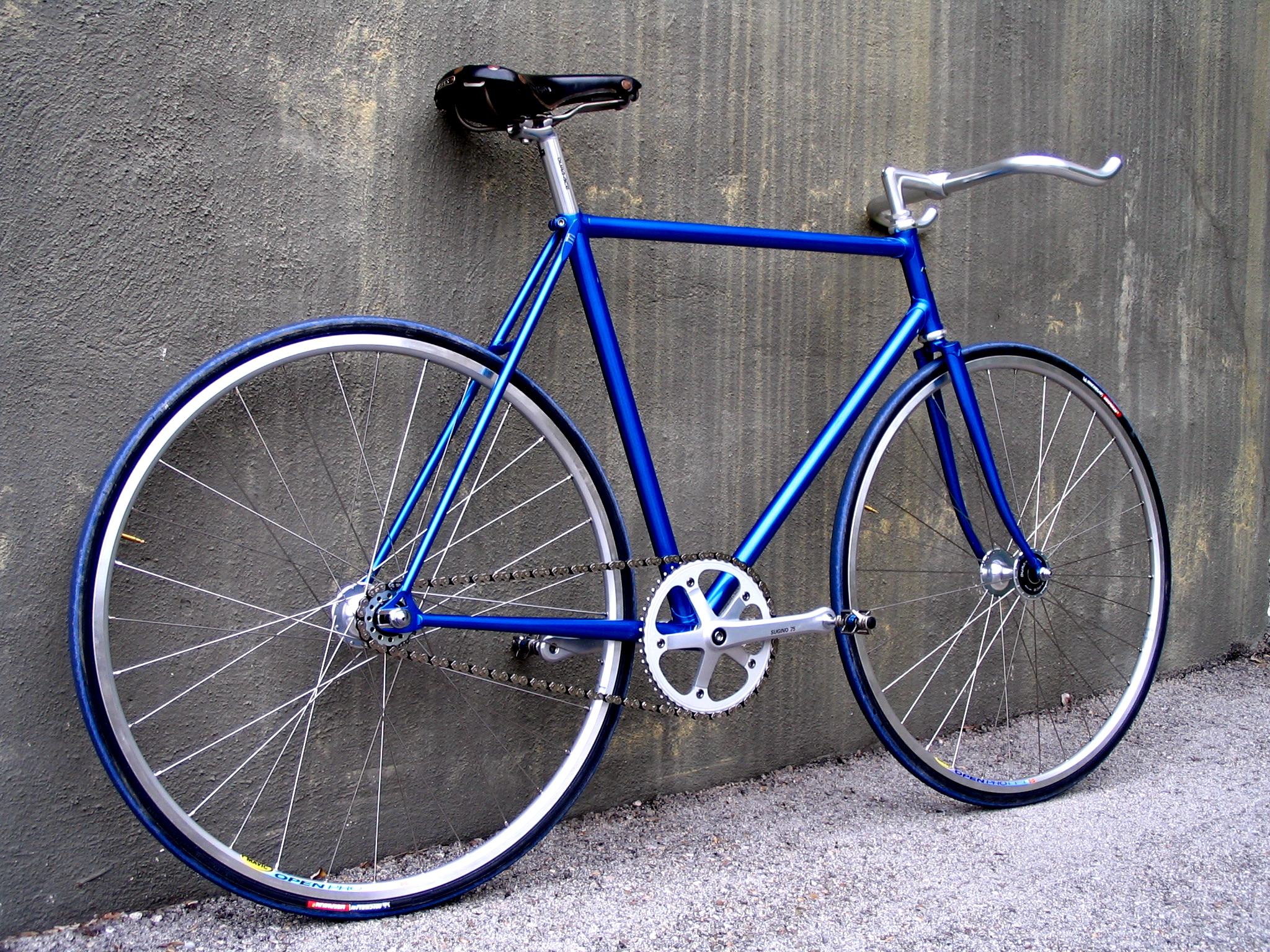
A fixed-gear bicycle

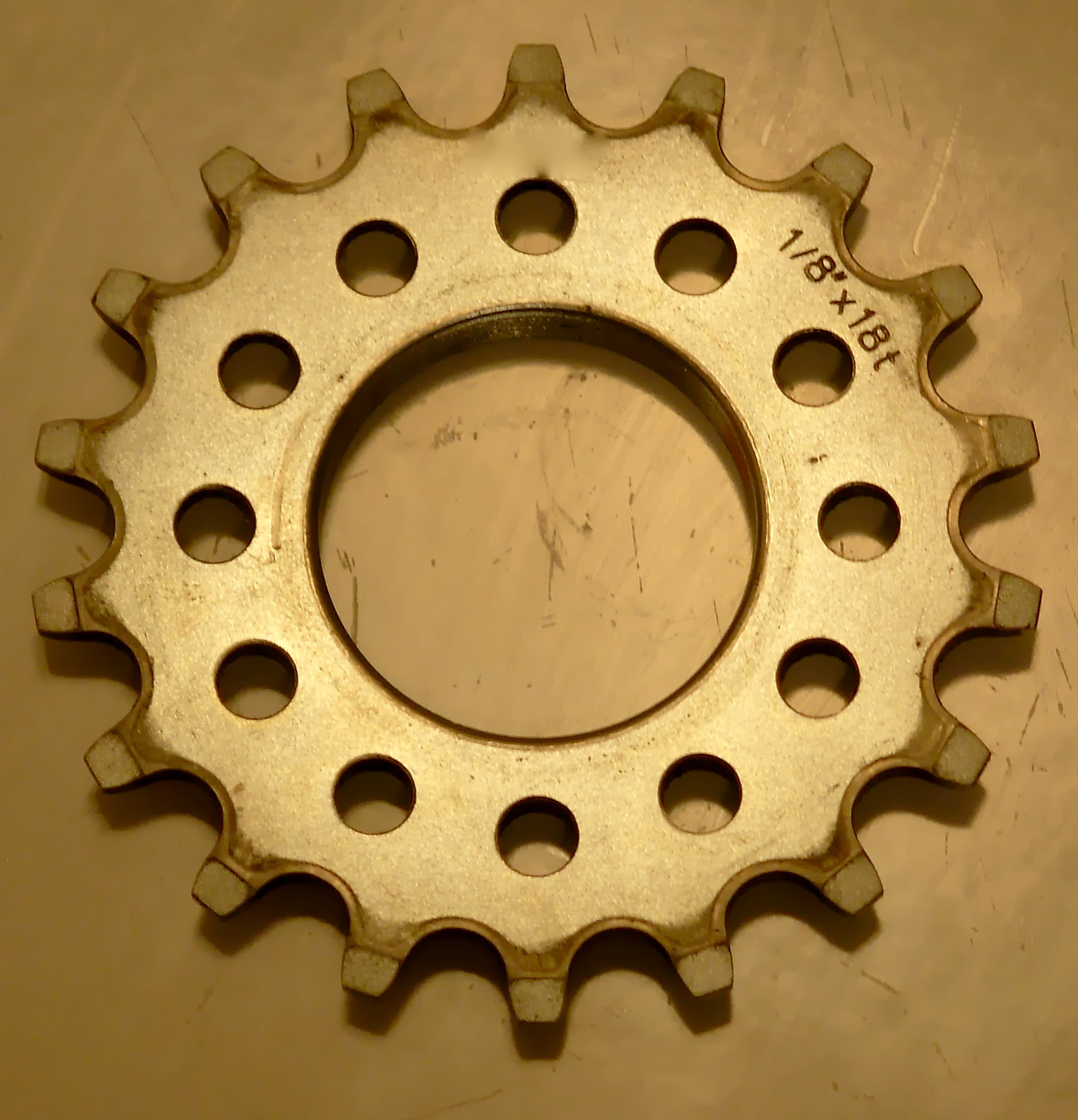
An 18-tooth sprocket that attaches to the rear hub of fixed-gear bike

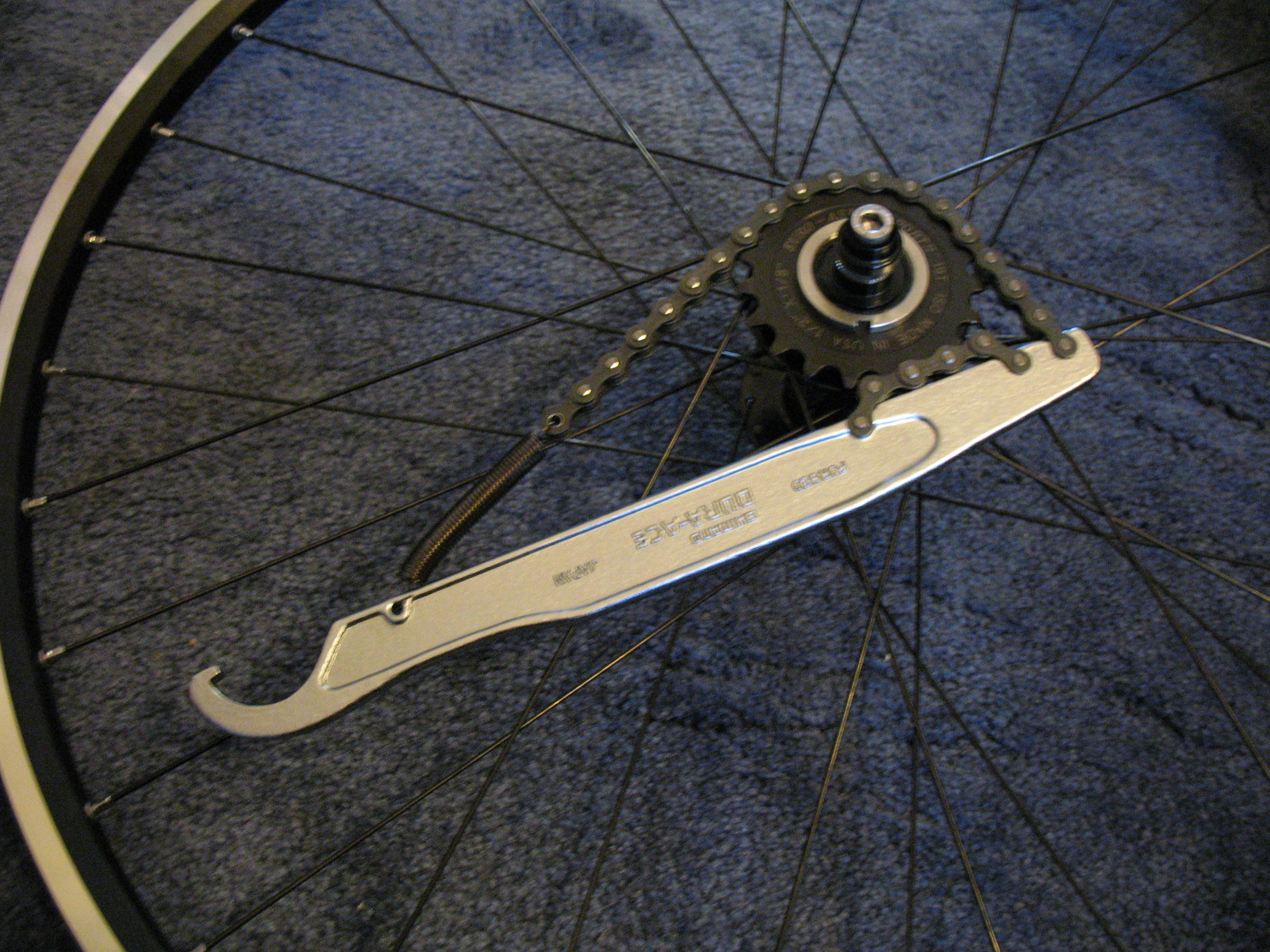
Track sprockets are typically attached and removed from the hub by screwing them with a chain whip. This tool incorporates a lockring spanner for securing a reverse threaded lockring against the sprocket.

A fixed-gear bicycle or fixie is a bicycle that has a drivetrain with no freewheel mechanism, meaning the pedals always spin together with the rear wheel. The freewheel was developed early in the history of bicycle design but the fixed-gear bicycle remained the standard track racing design. More recently the "fixie" has become an international subculture mainly among urban cyclists.

Most bicycle hubs incorporate a freewheel to allow the pedals to remain stationary while the bicycle is in motion, so that the rider can coast, i.e., ride without pedalling using forward momentum. A fixed-gear drivetrain has the drive sprocket (or cog) threaded or bolted directly to the hub of the back wheel, so that the pedals are directly coupled to the wheel. During acceleration, the pedal crank drives the wheel, but in other situations, the rear wheel can drive the pedal cranks. This direct coupling allows a cyclist to apply a braking force with the legs and bodyweight, by resisting the rotation of the cranks. It also makes it possible to cycle backwards.

Most fixed-gear bicycles are single-speed. A derailleur for gear selection would introduce chain slack, which would interfere with braking. Gear selection can, however, be accomplished with the use of an internally geared hub. For example, a Sturmey-Archer fixed-gear three-speed hub is a fixed-gear multi-speed arrangement. Most fixed-gear bicycles only have a front brake, and some have no brake.

== Uses ==
A track bicycle or track bike is a form of fixed-gear bicycle optimized for racing at a velodrome or at an outdoor track. Some road racing and club cyclists use a fixed-gear bicycle for training during the winter months, generally using a relatively low gear ratio, believed to help develop a good pedalling style. In the UK until the 1950s it was common for riders to use fixed-gear bicycles for time trials. The 1959 British 25 mile time trial championship was won by Alf Engers with a competition record of 55 minutes 11 seconds, riding an 84-inch fixed-gear bicycle. The fixed-gear was also commonly used, and continues to be used, in the end of season hill climb races in the autumn. A typical club men's fixed-gear machine would have been a "road/path" or "road/track" cycle. In the era when most riders only had one cycle, the same bike when stripped down and fitted with racing wheels was used for road time trials and track racing, and when fitted with mudguards (fenders) and a bag, it was used for club runs, touring and winter training. By the 1960s, multi-gear derailleurs had become the norm and riding fixed-gear bicycles on the road declined over the next few decades. Recent years have seen renewed interest and increased popularity of fixed-gear cycling.

In urban North America and similar areas in other Western cities, fixed-gear bicycles have achieved significant popularity, with the rise of discernible regional aesthetic preferences for finish and design details.

Dedicated fixed-gear road bicycles are produced in great numbers by established bicycle manufacturers. They are generally low in price and characterized by relaxed road geometry, as opposed to the steep geometry of track bicycles.

Fixed-gear bicycles are also used in cycle ball, bike polo and artistic cycling.

A fixed-gear bicycle is particularly well suited for track stands, a maneuver in which the bicycle can be held stationary, balanced upright with the rider's feet on the pedals.

== Advantages and disadvantages ==
One of the perceived main attractions of a fixed gear bicycle is low weight. Without the added parts required for a fully geared drive train—derailleurs, shifters, cables, cable carriers, multiple chain rings, freewheel hub, brazed-on mounting lugs—a fixed gear bicycle weighs less than its geared equivalent. The chain itself is subject to less sideways force and will not wear out as fast as on a derailleur system. Also, a fixed gear drivetrain is more mechanically efficient than any other bicycle drivetrain, with the most direct power transfer from rider to the wheels. Thus, a fixed gear requires less energy in any given gear to move than a geared bike in the same gear.

In slippery conditions some riders prefer to ride fixed because they believe the transmission provides increased feedback on back tire grip. However, there is also an increased risk of loss of control in such conditions. This is especially so when taking into account the large number of riders who ride brakeless. These riders must brake entirely through the drivetrain. Ideally this is done by resisting the forward motion of the pedals, shedding speed while the bike is still moving. Alternatively, though far less efficiently, one can brake by stopping the motion of the pedals in mid-rotation, causing the rear wheel to lock in place, allowing the bicycle to skid and slow down from kinetic friction (see below).

Descending any significant gradient is more difficult as the rider must spin the cranks at high speed (sometimes at 170 rpm or more), or use the brakes to slow down. Some consider that the enforced fast spin when descending increases suppleness or flexibility, which is said to improve pedalling performance on any type of bicycle; however the performance boost is negligible compared to the benefits of riding a free wheel.

Riding fixed is considered by some to encourage a more effective pedaling style, which it is claimed translates into greater efficiency and power when used on a bicycle fitted with a freewheel. It allows for the rider to engage in and practice proper cadence, which is the balanced and rhythmic flow of pedaling, enhancing performance for both cyclist and bicycle.

When first riding a fixed gear, a cyclist used to a freewheel may try to freewheel, or coast, particularly when approaching corners or obstacles. Since coasting is not possible this can lead to a "kick" to the trailing leg, and even to loss of control of the bicycle. Riding at high speed around corners can be difficult on a road bike converted into a fixed-gear bicycle, as the pedals can strike the road, resulting in loss of control. Proper track bikes have a higher bottom bracket to compensate for the constantly spinning cranks and largely mitigate this problem.

Perhaps the most obvious disadvantage is the lack of multiple gears, and the flexibility in pedaling cadence and resistance made available through gear shifting. Hilly or uneven mountainous terrain with steep grades can be particularly challenging, as the rider cannot adjust the gearing to match the terrain.

== Brakeless ==
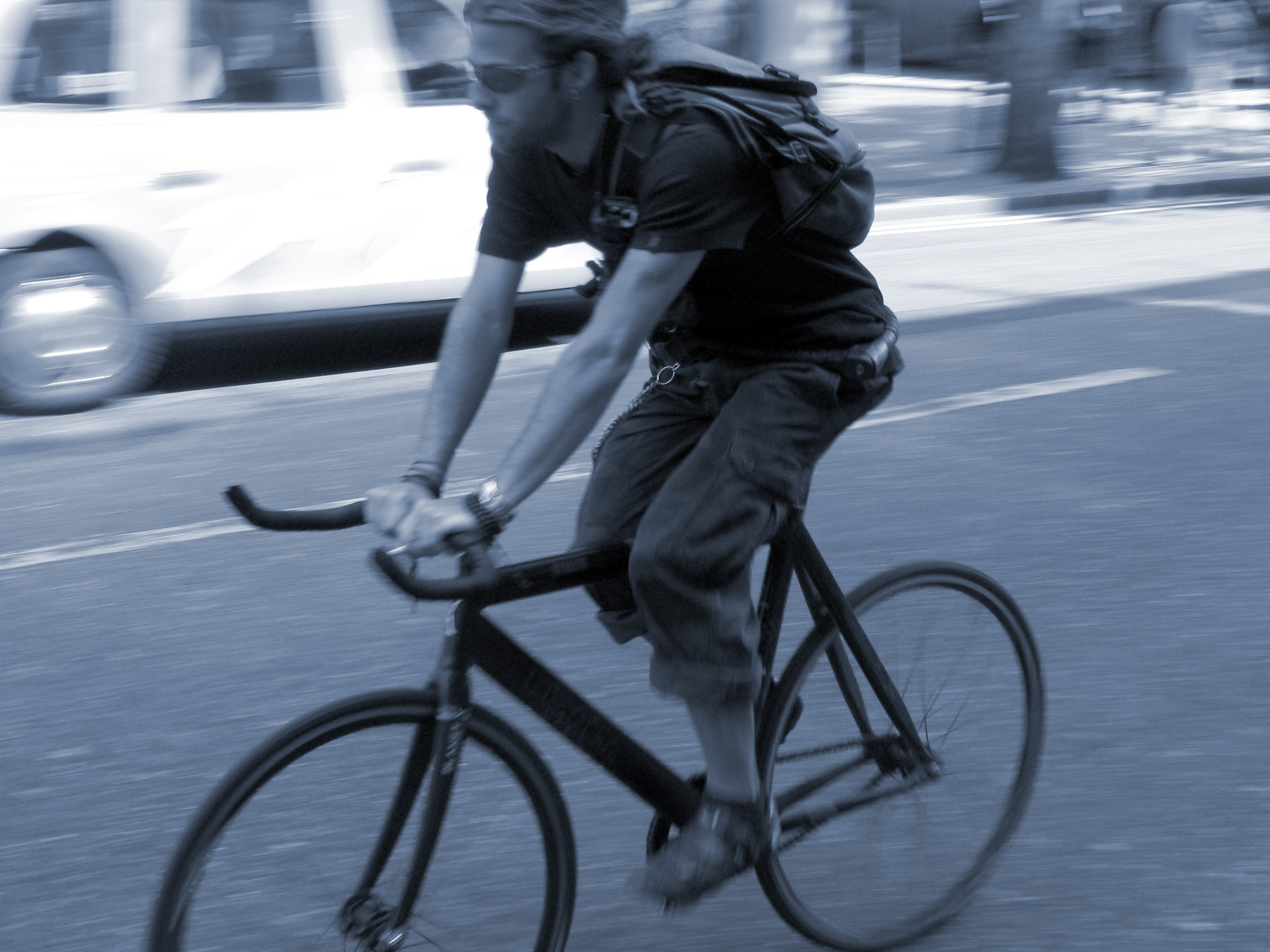
Cyclist riding a fixed gear bicycle without brakes

Many urban fixed-gear riders think brakes are not strictly necessary, and brakeless fixed riding has a cult status in some areas. Brakes and their cables are said to add extra bulk to the simple appearance of a fixed gear bicycle, and they prevent trick manoeuvres that involve spinning the front wheel in a full circle, unless equipped with special 360° freedom "detangler" system already used on BMX bicycles.

Other riders dismiss riding on roads without brakes as an affectation, based on image rather than practicality. Riding without brakes can be dangerous, is prohibited by law in many jurisdictions, and may jeopardize the chances of a claim in the event of an accident.

=== Technique ===
It is possible to slow down or stop a fixed-gear bike in two ways. The first, most efficient, and least stressful on the rider's body is by resisting the turning cranks as they come up and around, shedding speed with each pedal rotation. The second way, less efficient but more showy, is to bump or skid the rear wheel along the riding surface. Such a move is initiated by shifting the rider's weight slightly forward and pulling up on the pedals using clipless pedals or toe clips and straps. The rider then stops turning the cranks, thus stopping the drivetrain and rear wheel, while applying body weight in opposition to the rotation of the cranks. This causes the rear wheel to skid, and slow the bike. The skid can be held until the bicycle stops or until the rider desires to continue pedaling again at a slower speed. The technique requires practice and is generally considered dangerous when used during cornering.

On any bike with only rear wheel braking, the maximum deceleration is significantly lower than on a bike equipped with a front brake. As a vehicle brakes, weight is transferred towards the front wheel and away from the rear, decreasing the amount of grip the rear wheel has. Transferring the rider's weight back increases rear wheel braking efficiency, but a front wheel fitted with an ordinary brake might provide 70% or more of the braking power when braking hard.

=== Legality ===
Austria – Brakeless bicycles are illegal to ride on public roads. Every bike has to have two independent brakes, several reflectors and front and back lighting when conditions require it.

Australia – Bicycles are regarded as vehicles under the Road Rules in every state. A bike is required by law to have at least one functioning brake.

Belgium – All bicycles are required to have easy-to-hear bells and working brakes on both wheels. Lights and reflectors are not required on race, mountain, and children's bikes during daylight hours. Other (normal) bicycles need reflectors and lights. These lights may be attached to the body and may blink.

Brazil – Brazilian Traffic Law, article 105, subheading VI, says that, for bicycles, "bells, rear, front, sides and pedals signaling, and rear-view mirror on the left" are mandatory. Albeit, nothing is explicitly said about bicycle brakes.

Canada – Laws vary by province, and are controlled by highway and traffic acts. In Ontario and in Québec, a rear brake is required, and not having one may subject the rider to a fine. Alberta requires one functioning brake.

Denmark – All bicycles are required to have working brakes on both wheels, reflectors, and bells.

France – Bicycles must have two brakes, two lights, numerous reflectors, and a bell to be approved for road traffic. The laws are rarely enforced, however, and all kinds of unapproved bicycles are common.

Germany – All bicycles are required to have working brakes on both wheels, reflectors, and bells. A local court in Bonn accepted that the fixed-gear mechanism was a suitable back brake, but high-profile crackdowns specifically targeted fixed-gear bicycles in Berlin in an attempt to control what police described as a "dangerous trend"

Hungary – All bicycles are required to be equipped with two independent sets of brakes. Front and rear lamps, reflectors and a bell are also required.

Italy – All bicycles must have tires, two independent sets of brakes, a bell, a front white lamp, a rear red lamp and reflector, and amber reflectors on pedals and sides. However, these regulations are rarely enforced.

Korea - Brakeless bicycles are illegal in the Republic of Korea. Both front and rear brakes are required to ride a bike in public.

Netherlands – All bicycles are required to have an adequate brake system.

New Zealand – By law all bicycles must have a minimum of "...a good rear brake..."–and those made since 1 January 1988 must also have "...a good front brake..."

Poland – All bicycles must have at least one functional brake.

Russian Federation – All bicycles must have working brakes, handlebars and horns

Singapore – All bicycles must have at least a (one) functioning handbrake

Spain – All bicycles are required to have an adequate brake system on front and rear wheels, plus a bell.

Sweden – Bicycles are required to have a brake and bell. Additionally, when it's dark outside they are required to have lights facing forward and back as well as reflectors facing forward, back and to the sides.

United Kingdom – The Pedal Cycles (Construction and Use) Regulations 1983 require pedal cycles "so constructed that one or more of the wheels is incapable of rotating independently of the pedals, be equipped with a braking system operating on the front wheel"; riding a rear-wheel drive, fixed-gear bicycle with no front brake on public highways is illegal. Following the conviction of UK cyclist Charlie Alliston, who knocked over and killed a woman whilst riding a fixed-gear bicycle with no front brake, the UK Government announced a review of the laws covering "dangerous cycling" in September 2017. A brake on the rear wheel is only required for free-wheel bicycles.

United States – The use of any bike without brakes on public roads is illegal in many places, but the wording is often similar to "...must be equipped with a brake that will enable the person operating the cycle to make the braked wheels skid on dry, level and clean pavement..." which some have argued allows the use of the legs and gears. The retail sale of bikes without brakes is banned by the U.S. Consumer Product Safety Commission – but with an exception for the "track bicycle" (...a bicycle designed and intended for sale as a competitive machine having tubular tires, single crank-to-wheel ratio, and no free-wheeling feature between the rear wheel and the crank...).

== Conversion ==
Many companies sell bicycle frames designed specifically for use with fixed-gear hubs. A fixed-gear or track-bike hub includes special threads for a lockring that tightens in the opposite (counter-clockwise) direction compared with the sprocket. This ensures that the sprocket cannot unscrew when the rider "backpedals" while braking.

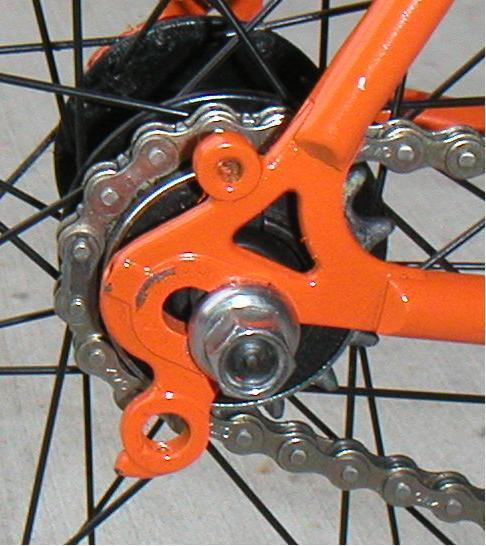
A horizontal dropout on a steel frame road bicycle converted to a single-speed. The derailleur hanger (below the axle) and an eyelet (above the axle) for mounting a fender or rack, both integral parts of the original frame, are now unused.

Many cyclists choose to convert freewheel bicycles to fixed gear. Frames with horizontal dropouts are straightforward to convert, frames with vertical dropouts less so. One method is to simply replace the rear wheel with a wheel that has a track/fixed hub. Another is to use a hub designed for use with a threaded multi-speed freewheel. Such a hub only has the normal right-handed threads for the sprocket and not the reverse threads for the lockrings used on track/fixed hubs. The sprocket on a hub without a lockring may unscrew while back pedalling. Even if a bottom bracket lockring is threaded onto the hub, along with a track sprocket, because the bottom-bracket lockring is not reverse threaded, the possibility still exists that both the sprocket and locknut can unscrew. Therefore, it is recommended to have both front and rear brakes on a fixed-gear bicycle using a converted freewheel hub in case the sprocket unscrews while backpedaling. It is also advisable to use a thread sealer for the sprocket and bottom bracket locking. The rotafix (or "frame whipping") method may be helpful to securely install the sprocket.

=== Chain tension ===
Bicycles with vertical dropouts and no derailleur require some way to adjust chain tension. Most bicycles with horizontal dropouts can be tensioned by moving the wheel forward or backward in the dropouts. Bicycles with vertical dropouts can also be converted with some additional hardware. Possibilities include:

- An eccentric hub or bottom bracket allows the off center axle or bottom bracket spindle to pivot and change the chain tension.
- A ghost or floating chainring is an additional chainring in the drive train between the driving chainring and sprocket. The top of the chain moves it forward at the same speed that the bottom of the chain moves it backwards, giving the appearance that it is floating in the chain.
- A magic gear—the right math can calculate a gearing ratio to fit a taut chain between the rear dropout and bottom bracket. Also, using a chain half link and slightly filing the dropouts to increase the width of the slot increases the chances of finding a magic gear. It is worth noting that the magic gear setup is controversial, due to inevitable chain stretch and subsequent slippage that can lead to serious injury.

Separate chain tensioning devices, such as the type that attaches to the dropout (commonly used on single speed mountain bikes) cannot be used because they are damaged as soon as the lower part of the chain becomes tight.

=== Chainline ===
Additional adjustments or modification may be needed to ensure a good chainline. The chain should run straight from the chainring to the sprocket, therefore both must be the same distance away from the bicycle's centerline. Matched groupsets of track components are normally designed to give a chainline of 42 mm, but conversions using road or mountain bike cranksets often use more chainline. Some hubs, such as White Industries' ENO, or the British Goldtec track hub, are better suited to this task as they have a chainline greater than standard. Failure to achieve good chainline, at best, leads to a noisy chain and increased wear, and at worst can throw the chain off the sprocket. This can result in rear wheel lockup and a wrecked frame if the chain falls between the rear sprocket and the spokes. Chainline can be adjusted in a number of ways, which may be used in combination with each other:

- Obtaining a bottom bracket with a different spindle length, to move the chainring inboard or outboard
- Choosing a bottom bracket with two lockrings, which gives fine adjustment of chainring position
- Respacing and redishing the rear wheel, where permitted by the hub design
- Placing thin spacers under the bottom bracket's right-hand cup (Sturmey-Archer make a suitable 1/16" spacer) to move the chainring outboard
- Placing thin spacers between the chainring and its stack bolts to move it inboard (if the chainring is on the inside of the crank spider) or outboard (if the ring is on the outside of the spider)
- Placing thin spacers between the hub shoulder and the sprocket. This is recommended in the case of a freewheel-threaded hub, which has sufficiently deep threads for this operation.

Usually, the rear hub is the best component on which to perform chainline adjustments, especially on threaded hubs. If a track hub is used, it is better to operate on the bottom bracket or - for minor shifts - on the crankset. The same occurs if a flip-flop hub is used, because the chainline should be the same in both sides (freewheel and fixed gear).

=== Gear ratio ===
Since fixed-gear bicycles do not have the capability to change gears on the fly, riders must choose their preferred gear ratio beforehand. A commonly used gear ratio that works well in most situations is 2.75:1, which can be implemented with a 44-tooth chainring and a 16-tooth rear sprocket.

== Competition ==
There are many forms of competition using a fixed gear bike, most of the competitions being track races. Formal track races most often take place in a velodrome, a circular track that is constructed of concrete or wood and can be indoor or outdoor. Race types such as common scratch races or more complex omnium races take place in these arenas.

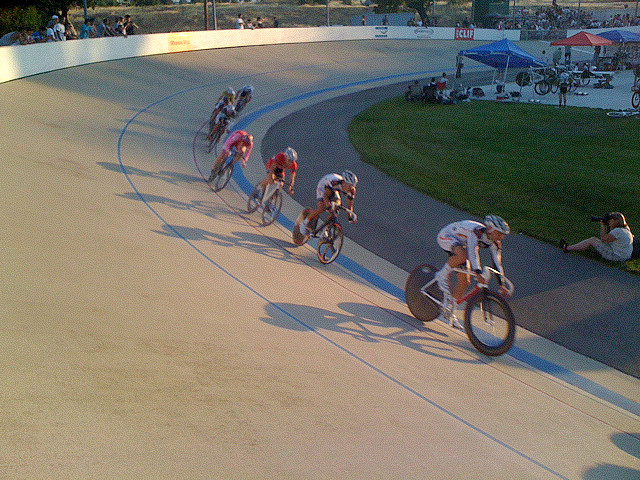
Track race taking place at the Hellyer Park Velodrome in San Jose, California

Keirin is a form of motor-paced cycle racing on a track with fixed-gear bicycle that meet a strict system of standards.

Moreover, bike messengers and other urban riders may ride fixed gear bicycles in alleycat races, which are normally held in city streets, including New York City's famous fixed-gear-only race Monstertrack alleycat. Wolfpack Hustle began in 2005 as a ride bringing together faster cyclists with the common love for riding. The group ride later expanded to an internationally known race series that takes place in Los Angeles, California. The group has managed to receive sponsorships from several well-known companies including Castelli, a bicycle apparel manufacturer, helping spread interest and knowledge about the group and the races they hold. In San Francisco, California, Red Bull at one point held Red Bull Ride + Style events, which brought together both track and freestyle fixed-gear riders from around the world for competitions.

There are also events based on messenger racing, such as Mixpression, which has been held nine times in Tokyo. Trick demonstrations have been held since the late 1800s in the U.S. and Europe; while they continued into a competitive form in Europe (artistic cycling), subsequent to the recent widespread popularity of fixed gear bikes, trick competitions have expanded to the U.S. and Asia. European competitions include solo and team balletic movements on a controlled, flat surface; US and Asian competitions often include "park" and "flatland" styles and venues, a la BMX. Other competitions include games of "foot down" and bike polo.

In 2006, Adventures for the Cure made a documentary film about riding across the United States on fixed gears; they repeated this feat as a 4-man team at the 2008 Race Across America.

Fixed-gear riders are also seen at the Single Speed World Championships.

== Maintenance and upkeep ==
Maintaining a fixed gear is relatively easy because it has fewer parts than a geared bicycle. The sprocket should be checked regularly to make sure there is no damage to any teeth and that no object is grinding it as it turns with the rear wheel. The chainring should be checked similarly for any damage.

There is an advantage to selecting a number of chainring teeth that is not a round multiple of the number of sprocket teeth (e.g. 3) because this avoids coincidence of the same chainring and sprocket teeth, and tire contact patch, on each of the rider's power strokes. For riders who perform brakeless skid-stops, it is best to select prime-numbered chainrings (e.g. 41, 43 or 47 teeth) to guarantee that rear tire wear is spread evenly.

It is imperative (for road riding, at least) that the chain be sufficiently tight that it is impossible for it to derail from either the chainring or sprocket. This generally equates to "no visible slack". A derailed chain can cause a variety of undesirable consequences, such as a locked rear wheel or, worst of all, destruction of the frame if the chain becomes caught around the pedal spindle and pulls the rear triangle forwards. On a fixed-gear bicycle without hand brakes, even a relatively benign derailment means a total loss of braking ability. Tensioning aside, a chain is significantly less likely to derail if the chainline is accurate and the chain is a traditional "full bushing" type with limited lateral flexibility. Because the difference between a tight and a slack chain equates to only very minor elongation of the links, chain tension should be visually checked at least weekly, especially if the bicycle is ridden in wet or dirty conditions.

As with any other bicycle, the chain should be checked making sure the master link is securely latched. The chain can be lubricated monthly for smooth riding. Also, as needed, the brakes should be tightened as they wear and tire condition observed for possible puncture locations. Air pressure in the tires, tire alignment, brake handle placement, and rust should be monitored on a daily basis because they can change very easily during a jarring ride.

== Subculture ==
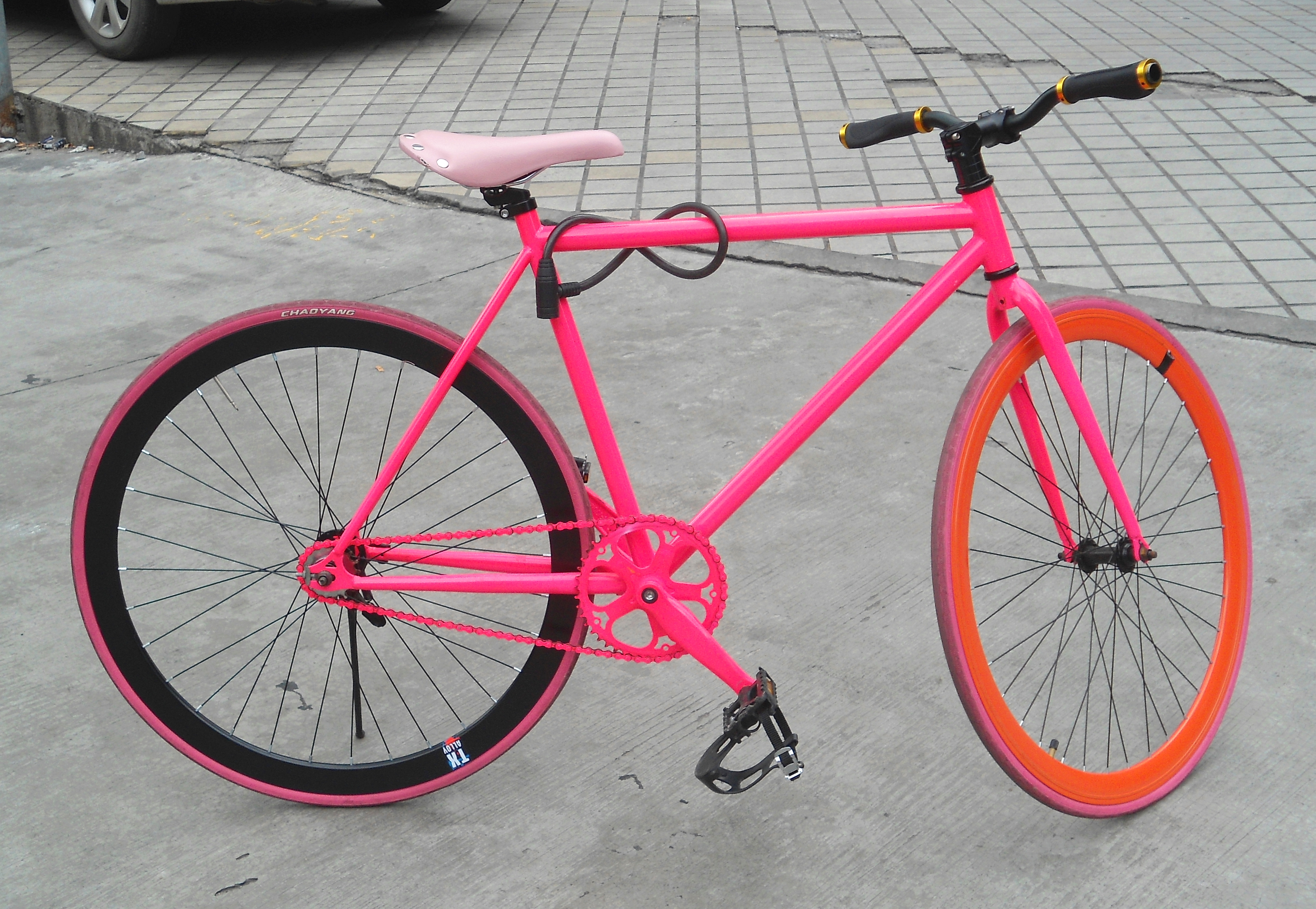
A fixed-gear bike in China

Fixed-gear bicycles are often associated with the hipster subculture.

=== Republic of Korea ===
The fixed-gear culture didn't catch on in Korea until the 2010s, but since the webtoon 'Wind Breaker' launched in 2013 they have become popular with middle school and high school students.

=== Australia ===
Until recently, the Australian fixie culture has been small. However, with the Australian dollar and cost effective manufacturing and importing from China, Australia has seen many new online stores capitalise on the cheap steel frames commonly imported to the UK and US. Online stores in Australia ship partially-assembled bikes directly to consumers, considerably undercutting prices at typical brick and mortar stores.

=== Russia ===
==== Fixed Gear Moscow ====
In 2007, a few activists started assembling and riding fixed gear bikes in Moscow. There had been people riding fixed gear bikes on the street in Moscow prior that time, but it had never developed into any feasible subculture. Appearances of the design in foreign media began increasing around that time, attracting more people to the concept.

A Fixed Gear Moscow LiveJournal blog community was formed, which allowed riders to communicate with each other and share ideas for rides. As interest grew, a separate web site was created to host the blog and the forum.

Fixed Gear Moscow has organized numerous alleycat races, tournaments, and other events to keep the community growing. Several side projects have been initiated by members of Fixed Gear Moscow and are still in development.

==== Red Bull Fixed gear Boulevard ====
In September 2013 Red Bull and Moscow government organized first race for fixed gear bikes in Moscow city center on the Boulevard ring. Distance that participants had to overcome was about 50 kilometers. The race was repeated in 2014.

=== Sweden ===
==== Community ====
There are also several bicycle clubs throughout Sweden with a fixed-gear niche. Komet Club Rouler is a club based in Gothenburg, annually arranging Svart Katt and other fixed-gear oriented activities. Svart Katt has been internationally recognized and is considered Sweden's largest alley cat by number of participators, according to Cog Magazine. KCR's equivalent in Malmö is called Pista Malmø, arranging ”Thursday's rides” every Thursday, for all bikes and riders. Stockholm also has its own informal fixed gear bicycle club, called Fista Sthlm.

==== Popularity factors ====
Several factors contribute to the recent rise in popularity of fixed-gear bicycle. A rider from Stockholm interviewed for an article about the phenomenon notes that riding a bike imparts a feeling of freedom to the rider. One is free to go wherever one wants, whenever one wants. A sense of belonging is also important; as the rider says, "all who cycle are my friends". Riders unknown to each other commonly greet each other when on bikes. As in many subcultures, this feeling of belonging is a key factor in recruiting and retaining participants.

The fact that many fixie riders ride brakeless in defiance of local law could also be viewed as a contributing factor to its popularity; it provides an outlet for minor rebellion.

=== United States ===
==== California ====
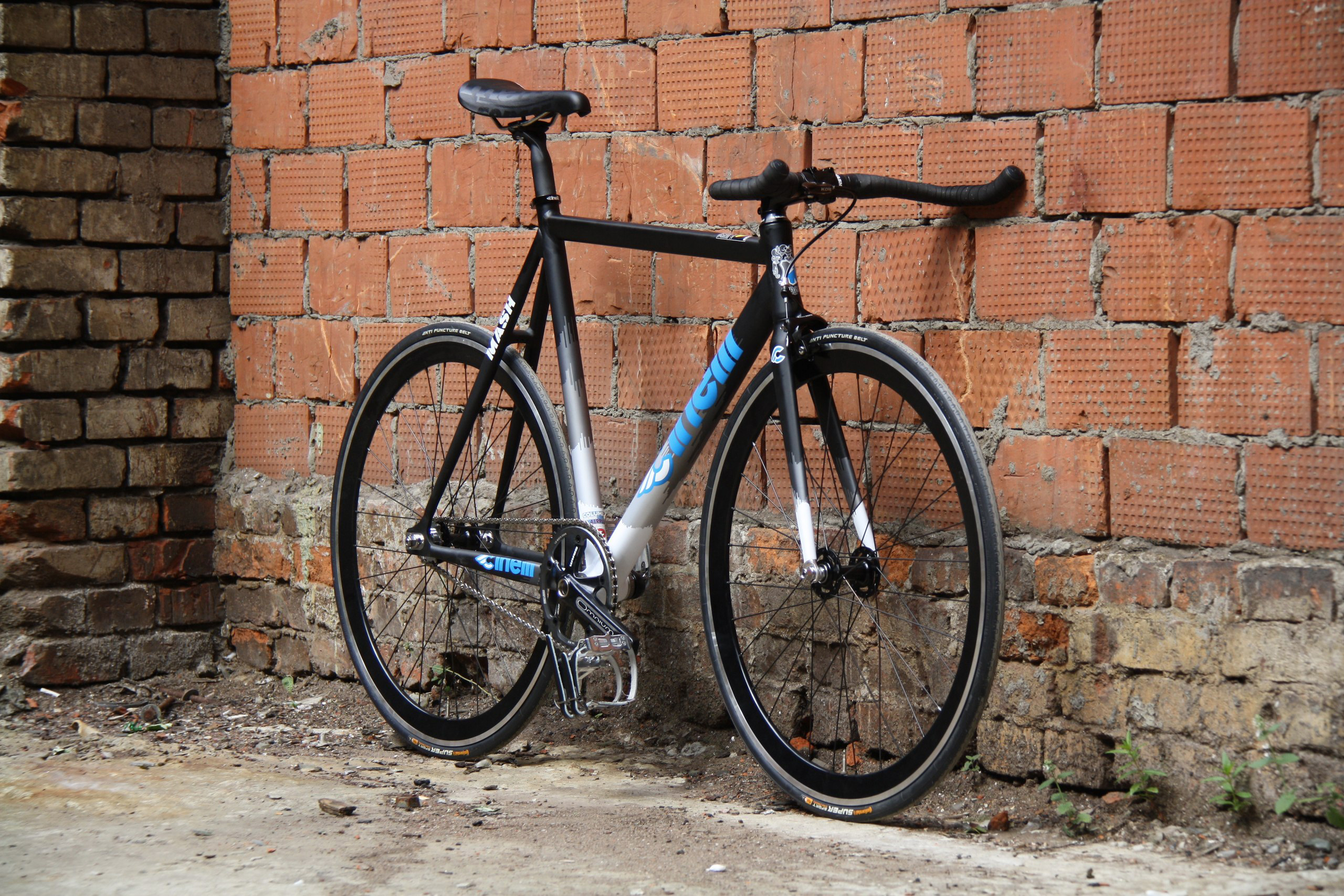
A Cinelli MASH Histogram frame

California's fixed gear community stretches throughout the state with groups in all of the major urban areas that come together for riding and racing. Sacramento has a rising fixed-gear community as popular bicycle shops such as The Bicycle Business are beginning to carry fixed gear bikes and groups of riders are forming.

San Francisco and San Jose have established fixed gear communities who host several established races and community rides. Companies such as Chrome Industries, who make bags and apparel catered toward bike messengers and urban cyclists, have been able to rise to prominence due to San Francisco and California's biking community. Also, stores such as MASH SF based in San Francisco, and IMINUSD based in San Jose accommodate fixed-gear cyclist specifically with riding gear, parts, and a center for the fixed-gear riding community in their respective cities. MASH SF collaborates with the Italian bicycle manufacturing company, Cinelli, to make several fixed gear bike framesets, including what is known as the Cinelli MASH Histogram. Furthermore, Macaframa is a group of riders from San Francisco who release movies dedicated to fixed-gear riding that encompass the fast-paced lifestyle that comes along with riding fixed.

Southern California is home to a very large fixed community, particularly in the greater Los Angeles area. Los Angeles based TRAFIK states “TRAFIK is Global Fixed Gear Culture” and works towards bringing the fixed-gear movement to a worldwide audience. Another southern California based crew is SMC. SMC "started out as a group of high school kids needing a name for their crew in 2010 is now the number one blog in the world for all things involving Fixed Gear Freestyle bikes".

==== New York ====
New York's fixed-gear community was largely born out of bicycle messengers in New York City looking for lower maintenance bicycles that were cheaper to acquire. The popularity of fixed-gear bicycles heavily coincides with the number of alleycat races that were taking part in the 2000s, going so far as to hosting exclusively brakeless fixed-gear races.

== Circus bikes ==
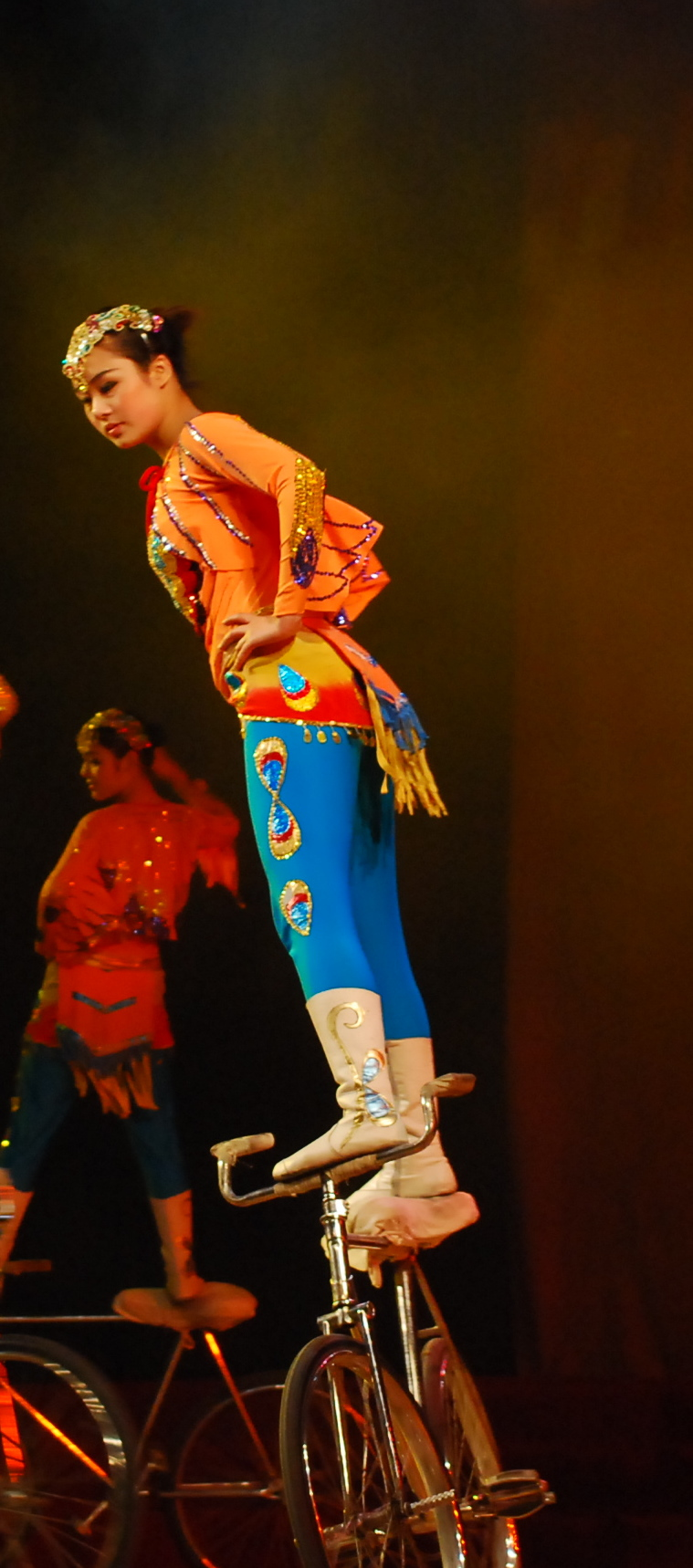
A circus performer standing on a fixed-gear bicycle

A fixed gear bike is also used in the circus arts (artistic cycling). When the saddle and handlebars are at the same height, an acrobat can stand on the handlebars and saddle and perform acrobatic exercises, sometimes involving multiple people, while continuing to circle the circus ring. It can be found as a niche sport in many countries. In addition to better speed control, the use of a fixed gear bike allows the artist to ride the bike backwards or only on the back wheel.

== In popular culture ==
The 2012 film Premium Rush uses a "fixie" as a running plot device. Wilee, the lead character played by Joseph Gordon-Levitt, works as a bike messenger in Manhattan, and his fellow riders rib him about his enthusiasm for his fixed-gear steel-frame bike with no brakes. He avoids one confrontation by pedaling the bicycle backward, and he successfully weaves through dangerous traffic, but he also gets into accidents because the fixed-gear style abets his avidity for speed. Wilee says, "I like to ride. Fixed gear. No brakes. Can't stop. Don't want to, either."

In its early years the Tour de France only ever featured bikes with a fixed gear. Once coasting and gears were developed, the Tour founder Henri Desgrange is quoted to have said: “Come on, fellows! Let’s say that the test was a fine demonstration – for our grandparents! As for me: Give me a fixed gear.”

== See also ==
- Artistic cycling
- Freestyle fixed gear
- Flip-flop hub
- List of bicycle parts
- Outline of cycling
- Track bicycle
- Keirin
- Extreme sport
