= Track bicycle =

Bicycle optimized for racing at a velodrome or outdoor track

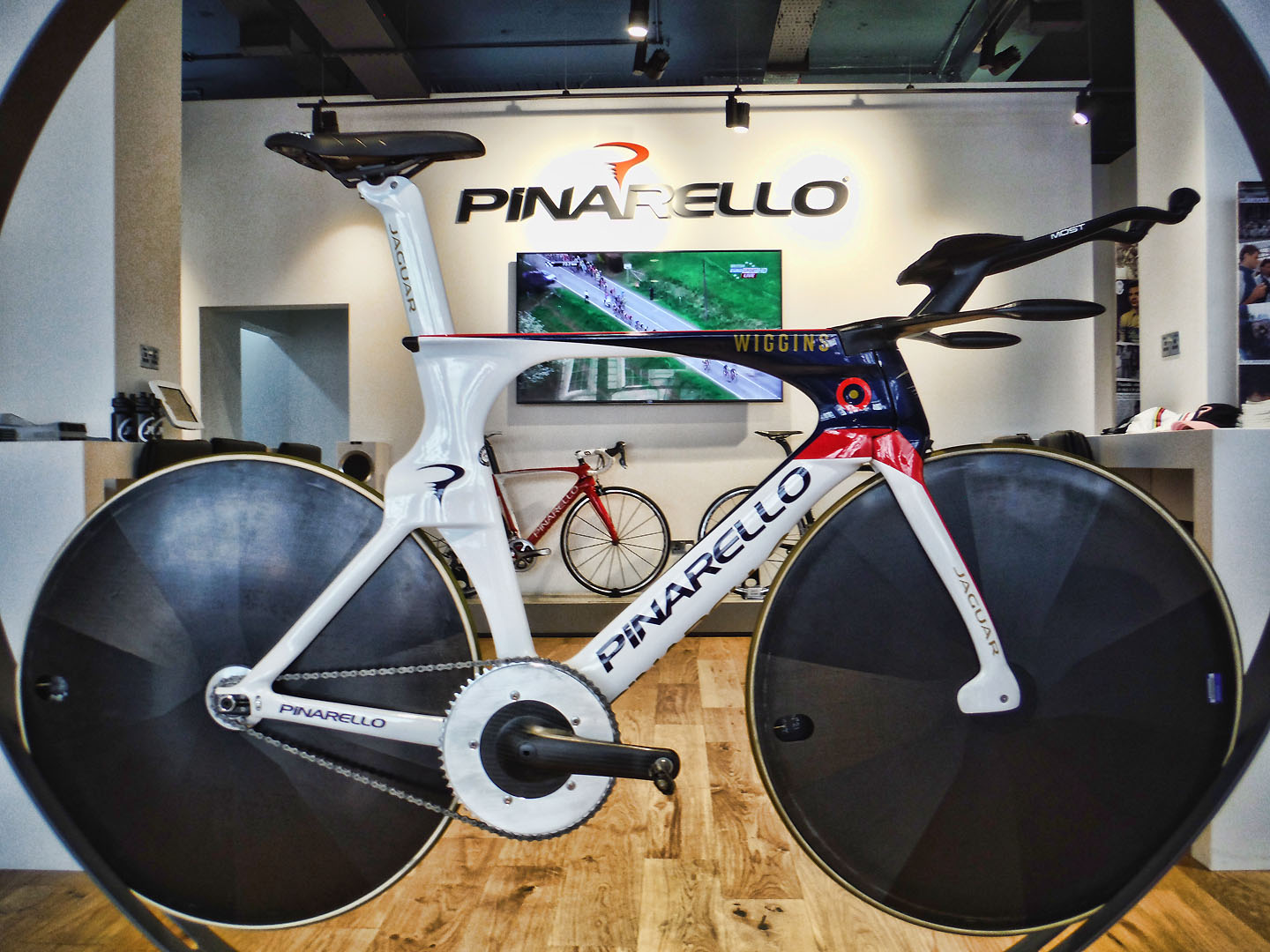
The track bicycle made by Pinarello that Bradley Wiggins rode to break the hour record in June 2015

A track bicycle or track bike is a bicycle optimized for racing at a velodrome or outdoor track. Unlike road bicycles, the track bike is a fixed-gear bicycle; thus, it has only a single gear ratio and has neither a freewheel nor brakes. Tires are narrow and inflated to high pressure to reduce rolling resistance.

== History ==
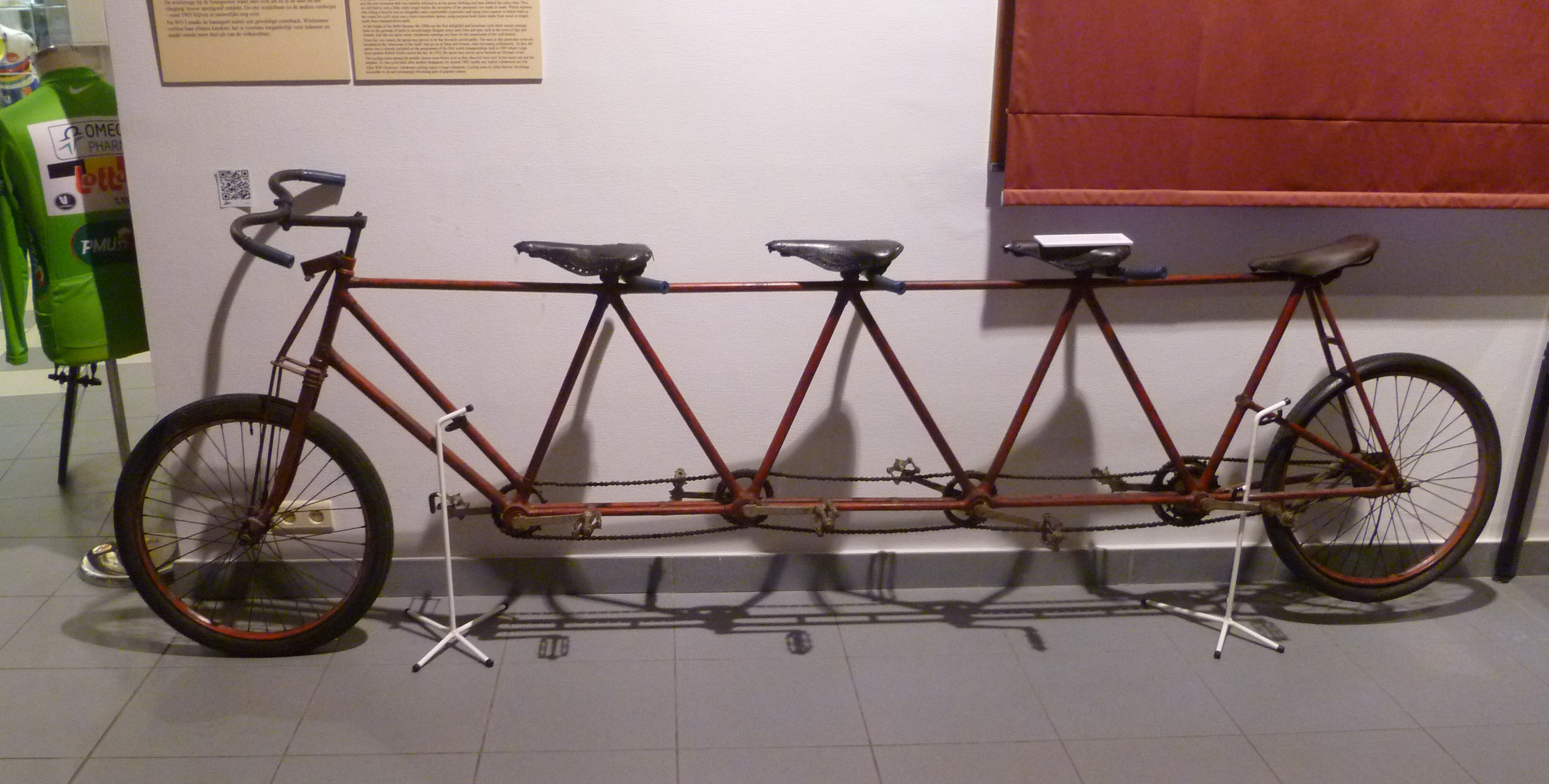
Track bicycle (1893) for four, with the first one acting as pacesetter

The first bicycle race is popularly held to have been a 1,200 meter race on the 31 May 1868 at the Parc de Saint-Cloud, Paris. It was won by expatriate Englishman James Moore who rode a wooden bicycle with iron tires. The machine is now on display at the museum in Ely, Cambridgeshire, England.

The Union Cycliste Internationale was founded on 14 April 1900 by Belgium, the United States, France, Italy, and Switzerland to replace the International Cycling Association, which had been formed in 1892, over a row with Great Britain as well as because of other issues.

== Frame design ==
A track frame is specific to its intended use, with emphasis on rigidity and lightness. Frames for sprinting seek to maximize rigidity, while those for general racing seek to reduce aerodynamic drag. The dropouts or track ends face rearwards to facilitate chain tension adjustment. A true track fork, unless aerodynamics are the primary consideration, has round-section blades for greater lateral stiffness when sprinting. The crown is sometimes drilled to give the option of mounting a front brake when the bike is used on the road.

=== Rules ===
The governing body, the Union Cycliste Internationale (UCI), sets limits on design and dimensions as well as the shape and diameter of the tubes used to construct the frame. The UCI permits special exceptions for the construction and geometry of track bikes.

For track competitions, the elements of the bicycle frame may be tubular or solid, assembled or cast in a single piece in any form (including arches, cradles, beams or any other). These elements, including the bottom bracket shell, shall fit within a template of the triangular form defined in article 1.3.020.

A Keirin bike is a track bike for Keirin races in Japan that meets the strict system of standards of the JKA Foundation (Japan Keirin Autorace Foundation), the governing body for Keirin competitions, still popular under the abbreviation of its predecessor body - NJS (Nihon Jitensha Shinkōkai or the Japanese Bicycle Association).

=== Geometry ===
Bicycle frame measurements

A track bicycle frameset typically differs from one used on the road in the following ways:

- higher bottom bracket – so the pedals are less likely to strike a steeply banked track
- shorter chainstays and overall wheelbase – befitting the tight quarters of velodrome races
- steeper seat tube angle and longer reach – trading long-term comfort for aerodynamic benefits
- steeper head tube angles and lower fork offset to achieve higher trail and lower flop – for stability at speed near other riders

These changes represent substantial compromises compared to a typical road bike. For example, even medium-sized track frames often have substantial toe overlap with the front wheel; while not an issue for velodrome riding, it can make slow-speed turns difficult if the bike were used on the road.

=== Material ===
Frames are assembled from tubular elements (typically with round or elliptical cross sections), or cast in a mould for "one-piece" type models. The most popular materials for frame building include steel, aluminium, or titanium alloys, carbon fiber, or a combination of these materials. Carbon fiber frames are most common at the professional level.

== Gear ratio ==
Track bicycles have only one drive sprocket (or cog) and one chainring, so the size ratio is relevant. A lower gear ratio allows quicker acceleration or 'jump' but can limit top speed. A larger gear ratio makes sustained speed easier, important in pursuit racing, time trial and bunched races such as points or scratch events. Without a good jump, the rider risks opponents accelerating away; without good sustained speed, the rider will be unable to keep up with a fast race. Track sprinters make a compromise by using particular gear ratios that allow them to reach race speeds at a relatively high cadence (pedalling), around 130-135 revolutions per minute (r/min).

Long-distance attempts such as the hour record sometimes use high gear combinations such as 52×12 or 55×14. Ondřej Sosenka used 54×13 with 190 mm cranks to set the 2005 record.

== Chain ==
Bicycle chains used in track, fixed gear and single speed cycling come in two common roller widths (the internal width between the inner plates), which is either 2.38 mm (3/32 in) or 3.18 mm (1/8 in). The chainring, sprocket and chain should all be the same width. Although a wider chain will work on a narrower chainring or sprocket, it is not ideal. A narrower chain will not work on a wider chainring or sprocket. Newer bicycles with derailleur gears use bushingless 2.38 mm (3/32 in) chains which flex, making gear changing possible. There are also 3.2 mm (1/8 in) bushingless chains on the market, which can be lighter or cheaper. Track bicycles, however, need increased strength rather than a lightness or a flexibility, so most of the track chains still use the full-bushing design.

== Tires ==
Tubular tires are most often used in track racing and training, though advances in clincher tire design have seen them being used somewhat more often.

== See also ==
- Outline of cycling
- Path racer
- Keirin
