= Cycling in Kuala Lumpur =

Transport by bicycle in Kuala Lumpur, Malaysia

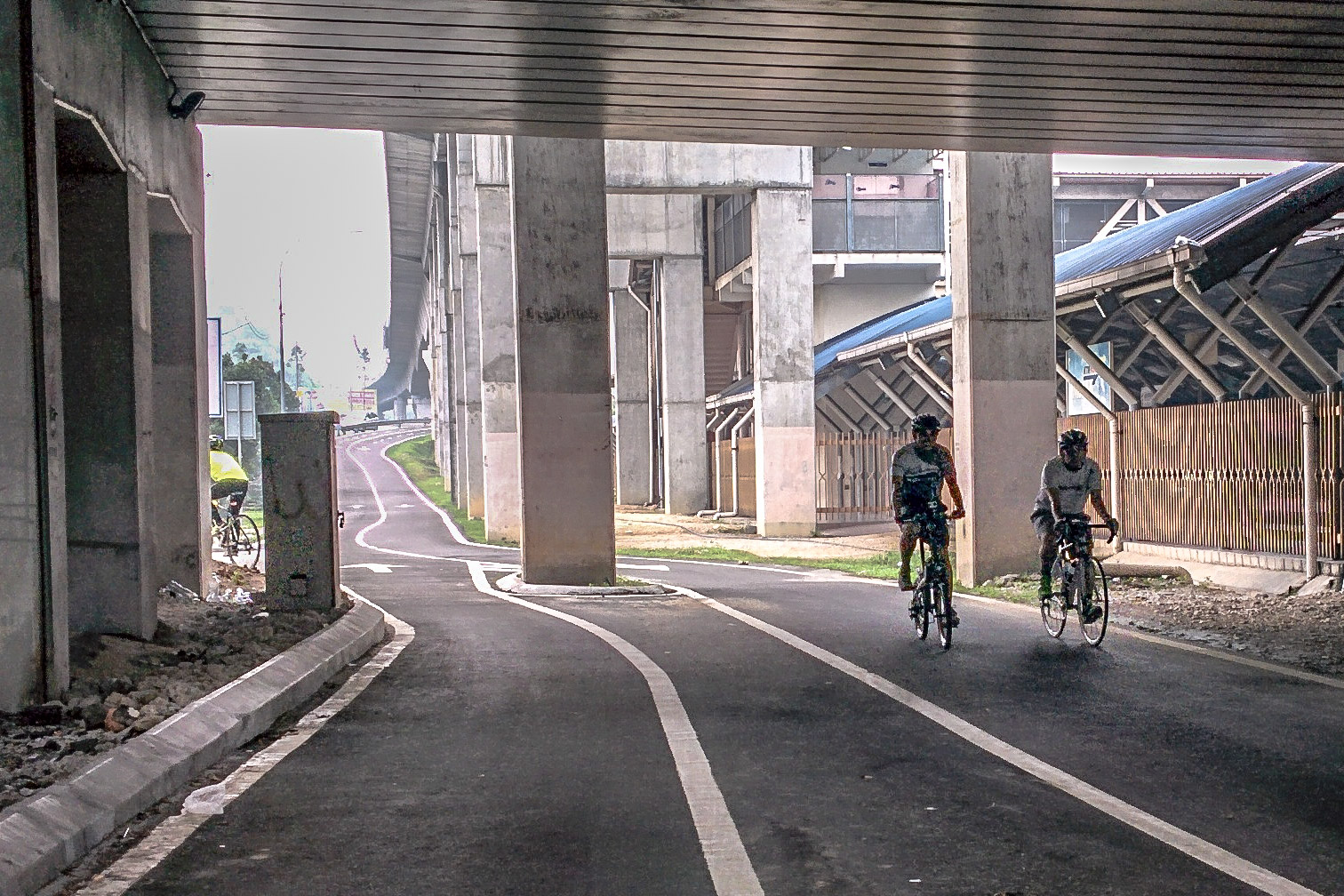
Southwest Dedicated Bicycle Highway heading from Jalan Klang Lama. On the right side is the building of Mid Valley Komuter station.

Cycling in Kuala Lumpur (Malay: Menunggang basikal di bandaraya Kuala Lumpur) refers to the bicycle uses in Kuala Lumpur, Malaysia for touring, recreational, work and transportation purpose. It was first appeared on 1938 when there is a first road cycling race that has been introduced in Kuala Lumpur. The bicycle in Kuala Lumpur later became one of the preferred transportation methods for students and mid-class citizens. As Kuala Lumpur begin its rapid urbanization progress since 1960s, the usage of bicycle start to decline as people shifting their transportation method to driving. In recent years however, the roads of the city have seen an increased presence of cyclists, whereas the importance of doing exercise has become more recognized. To match this positive change, and to reduce air pollution, the city urgently needs the introduction of more pavements and bicycle lanes, ideally by leveraging on the vast area that is currently taken up by motorways. Given that Kuala Lumpur lacks many bicycle-friendly routes suitable for cyclists in the city, however, proposals of a bicycle infrastructure of urban bicycling program were drafted, mainly under the Kuala Lumpur Structure Plan 2020 and cycling activism by Cycling Kuala Lumpur in order to encourage more citizens of Kuala Lumpur to cycle in the urban area.

== Background ==
The history of cycling in Kuala Lumpur dates back to 1938 when there were a few road racing events which were held in the city and became one of the main transportation methods for mid-class citizens during the 1980s. The first bicycle route in Malaysia is Wangsa Maju bike route which is located in the residential area of Wangsa Maju, which costs US$ 320,000 to build, officially opened in 1997 to public while at the same time the mayor of Kuala Lumpur, Tan Sri Dato’ Kamaruzzaman Shariff announced that another US$1.6 million will be allocated for future bike route by encouraging developers of real estate to include bike routes in their residential area. Despite its effort to encourage people to cycle in Kuala Lumpur, many people still prefer to choose driving as their main mode of commuting to Kuala Lumpur at that time due to the urbanization of Kuala Lumpur since 1960s and introduction of automotive industry in Malaysia, particularly the debut of PROTON in 1983.

However, in 2012, Jeffrey Lim, the leader of the cycling activism for Cycling Kuala Lumpur, had an idea of creating a Kuala Lumpur map which is specialized for cyclists to cycle in the city using the possible and suitable routes. The development of the map involving more than 50 volunteers who seeking for suitable routes for cyclist to ride bicycle, which will then marked to the blank map that are given by Lim. During the development of the map, the city still lacks many facilities for cyclists to cycle around the city such as bike routes, segregated bike routes and bicycle parking. The first version of the map was completed in September 2014 and distributed through participating bicycle shops for free and released in English, Malay and Chinese language. This mapping program has attracted the mayor of Kuala Lumpur City Hall (DBKL), Ahmad Phesal Talib, who has cycling as one of his interests, to participate in the introduction and improvements of an urban cycling program.

In 2013, Ahmad Phesal Talib announces that the city council has planned to upgrade the cycling infrastructures in Kuala Lumpur to promote healthy lifestyle among peoples in urban zone. This proposal was announced during the Earth Hour session at Kuala Lumpur in 2013. While the construction of the infrastructure must be located in the populated area, its infrastructure must also be connected with the nearby rapid transit system in the city such as RapidKL Rail. In addition to the improvements to the infrastructure, the city hall also announces the construction of the 10 km bicycle highway which is known as Southwest Dedicated Bicycle Highway, which connects from Merdeka Square to Mid Valley Megamall. The 5.5 km Southwest Dedicated Bicycle Highway which costs RM 700,000 to construct, officially opened in April 2015.

== Aim ==
The aim for the bicycling movement in Kuala Lumpur is to promote travelling in Kuala Lumpur in an alternative way that are healthy, cheaper and reduce traffic congestion and pollution while cultivating the culture of cycling among Malaysian people, to par with existing cycling cultures in Copenhagen and in Stockholm. In addition to the tourism, lifestyle and bicycle culture, the bicycle movement also aims to make Kuala Lumpur as a preferred international cycling destination to attract cyclists from Asian region to cycle in this region.

== Bicycle infrastructure ==
=== Bike route ===
Currently, only few dedicated bicycle routes exist in Kuala Lumpur. These are:

Name	Location	Year	Notes	References
Southwest Dedicated Bicycle Highway	From Mid Valley Megamall to Merdeka Square	2015	The first bike route officially opened under the new Cycling Kuala Lumpur program. As of 2018 a big chunk of the bike track is no longer accessible due to construction works.	
Taman Tun Dr Ismail bike route	Taman Tun Dr Ismail			
Wangsa Maju bike route	Wangsa Maju	1997	The first bike route in Malaysia.	

Other routes for the upcoming bicycle highway / bicycle-friendly routes are confirmed in the blueprint are:

- Cheras bike route
- KL Sentral - Lake Garden (Planned completion was 2018. No work has been started as of January 2019)
- Wangsa Maju - Taman Melawati bike route
- Wangsa Maju - Taman Batu Muda bike route

In addition to these blueprints, additional facilities will also be installed together with the existing bike route such as closed-circuit television (CCTV), solar panel and revitalization of the landscape surrounding the bike route. Furthermore, additional 4m of the space under elevated railway and monorail has been reserved for bike route purpose. Due to some of the motorists start parking at bike route illegally since the opening of the Southwest Dedicated Bicycle Highway, actions has been taken by the authorities to ensure that no motorists can park their car on the bike route by educating the motorists about rules of the bike route in addition to tow away the car that are parked on the bike lane.

There are also some bike routes inside the park and hill area for recreational such as Bukit Kiara and FRIM which is popular for road cycling and mountain biking.

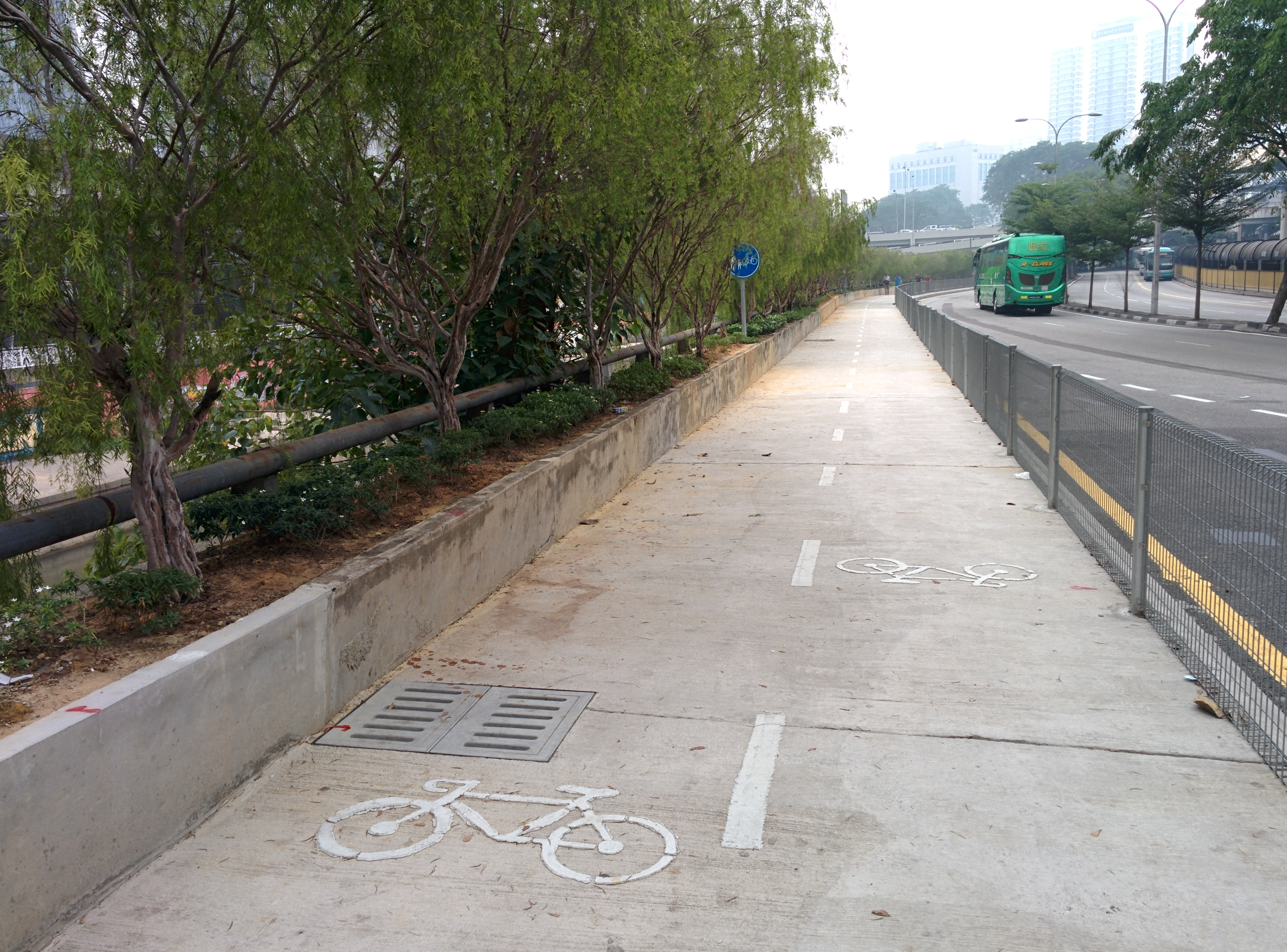
Southwest Dedicated Bicycle Highway, viewed from north.

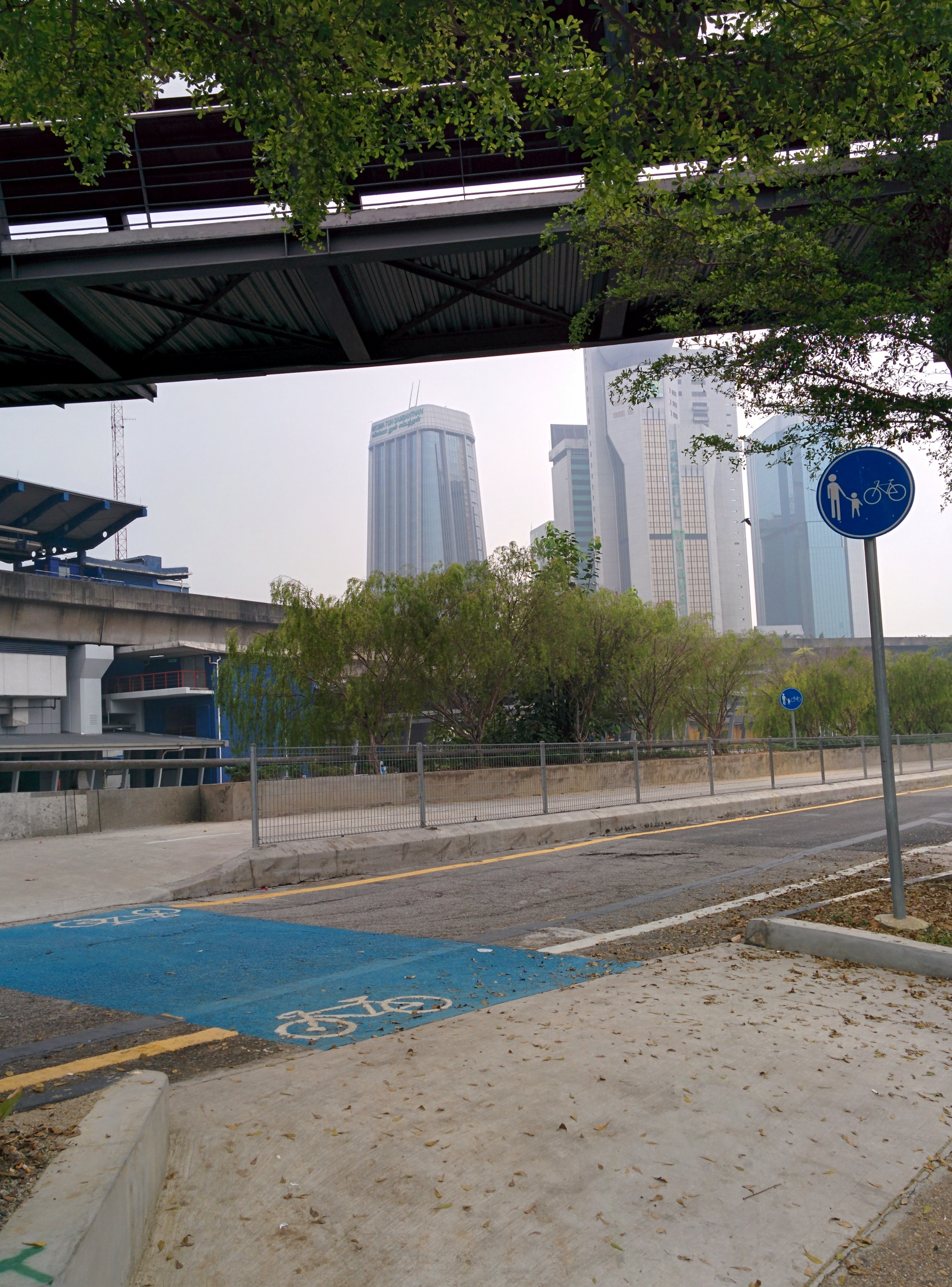
Bike crossing with sign and blue route at northern part of Southwest Dedicated Bicycle Highway, located near POS Malaysia headquarter.

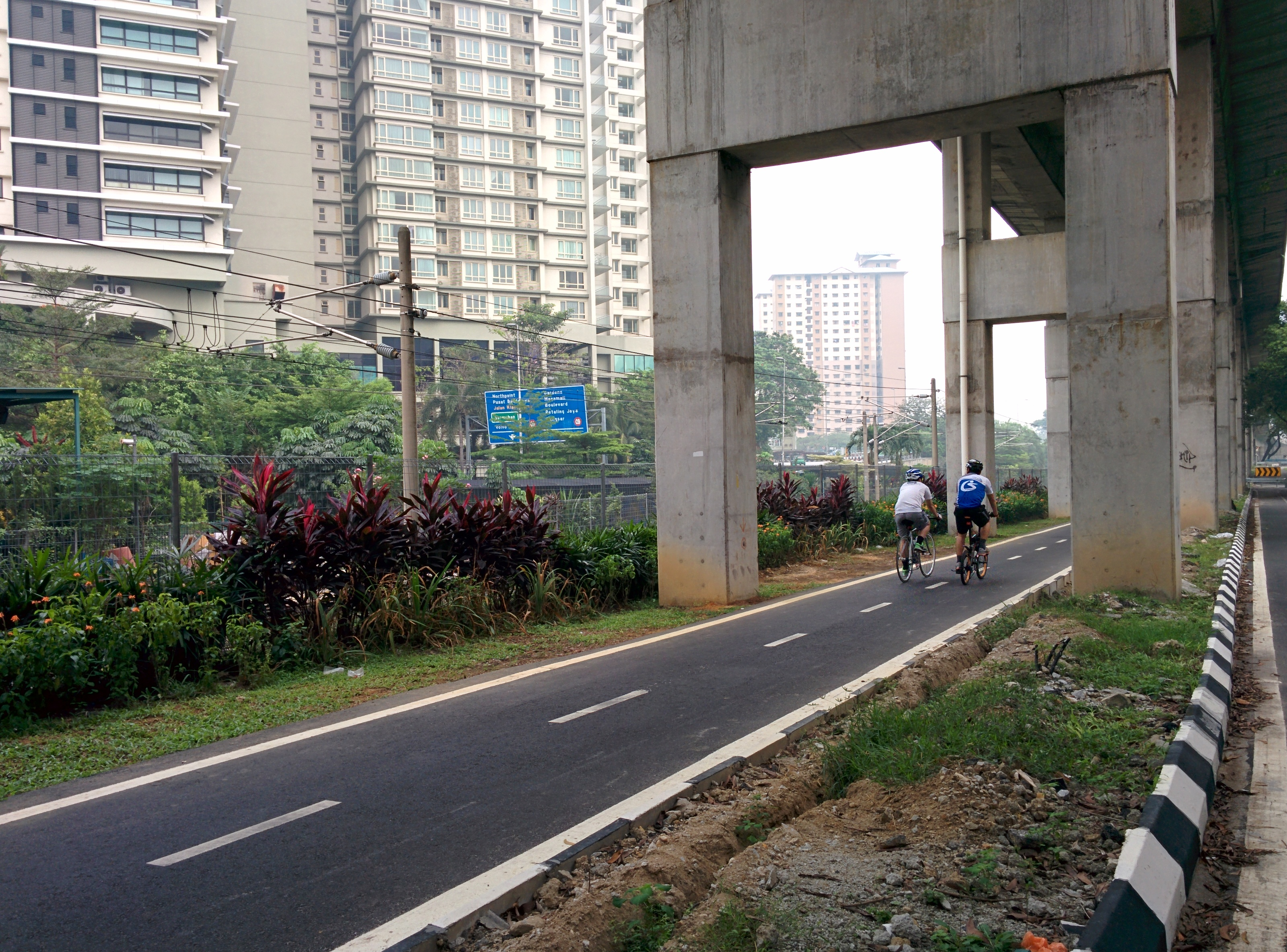
Southwest Dedicated Bicycle Highway, heading from Mid Valley Megamall.

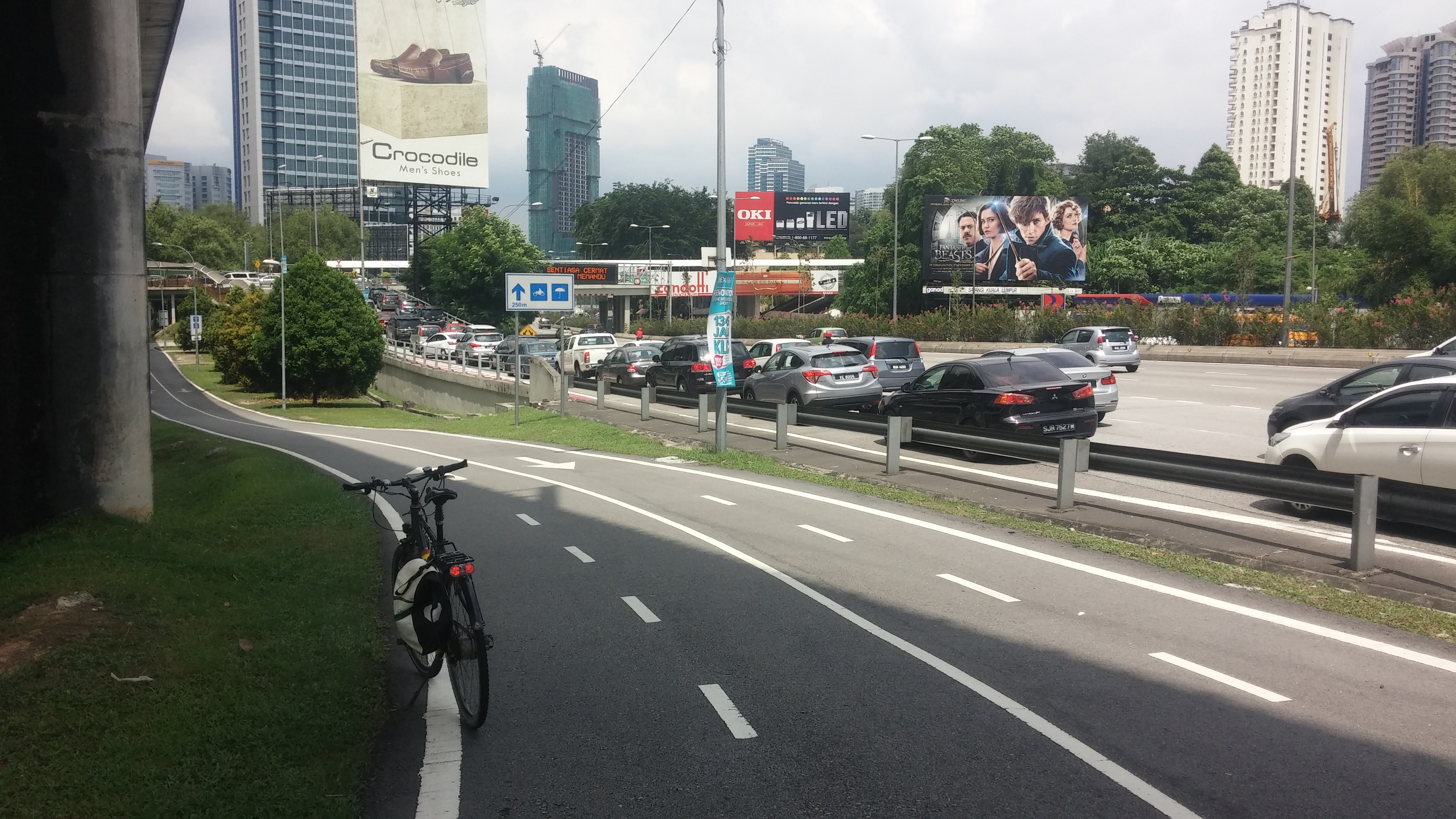
No jam on Southwest Dedicated Bicycle Highway, next to Mid Valley Megamall.

=== Parking ===
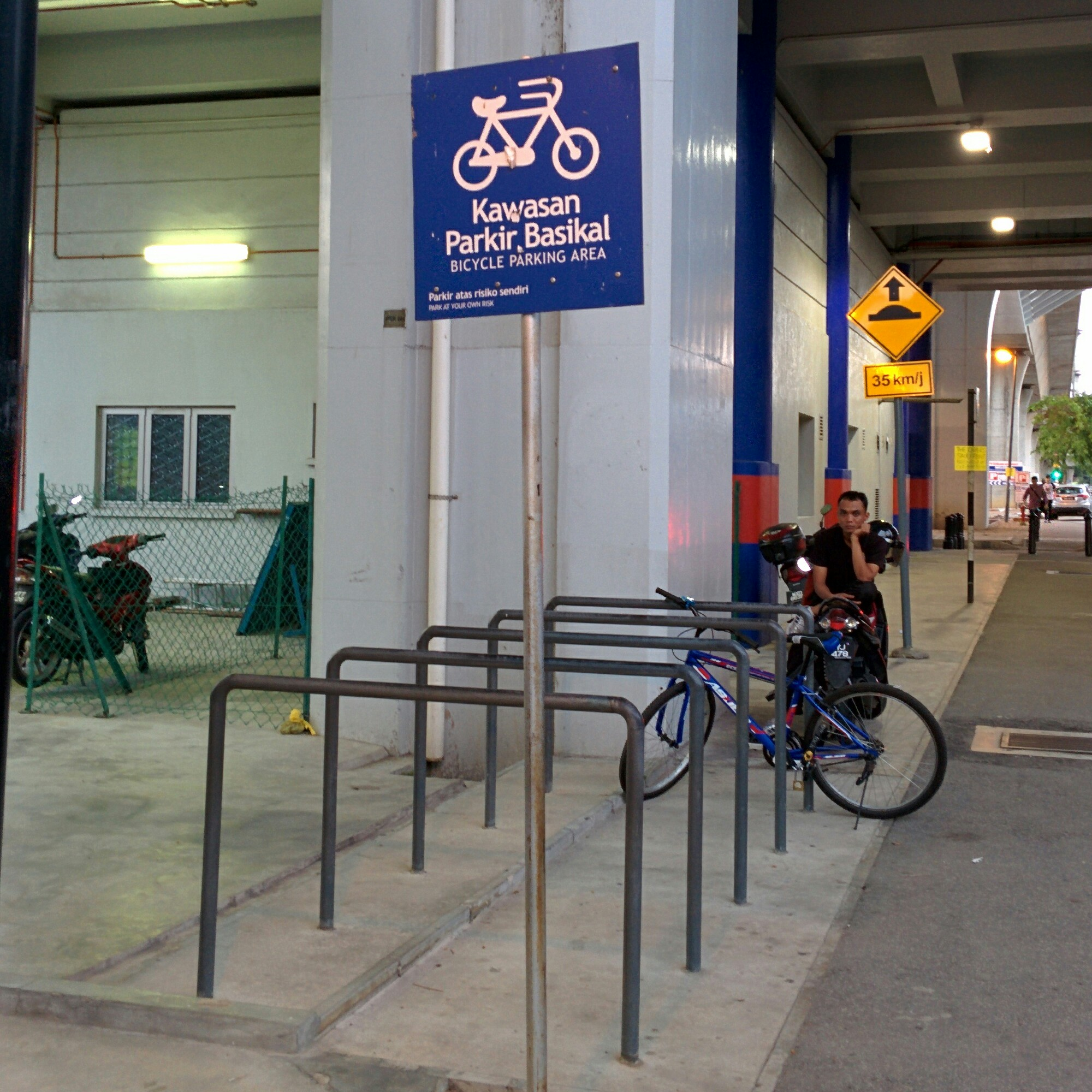
Bicycle parking rack at RapidKL Sentul LRT Station

In most of the bus station and rapid transit station, bicycle parking facilities such as parking rack are provided for cyclists who are not able to carry the bicycle to the bus and train other than foldable bikes. However, due to lack of awareness by commuters who know about the existence of parking facilities provided inside the building, some cyclists choose to park their bicycle near the objects where the cyclists are able to lock their bicycle such as water pipes if they think their bicycle are not very expensive.

Now, over 42 station in Ampang/Sri Petaling Line and Kelana Jaya Line have “Bike N' Ride” service.

== Transporting bicycles ==
Bicycle can now be allowed to carry inside the bus and rapid transit. However, there are some restrictions applies regarding carrying the bike to rapid transit. Only foldable bikes are allowed to carry to the bus and rapid transit due to the size of bicycle that are easy to carry than other types of regular bikes and bikes are also prohibited to carry during peak hour. The maximum people in a cycling group to carry and ride inside the public transportation vary by types of lines and transportation methods. In Ampang Line, maximum five cyclists are allowed to on board, while on Kelana Jaya Line maximum two cyclists are allowed to on-board and only one cyclist is allowed to on board in bus.

== Bicycling events ==
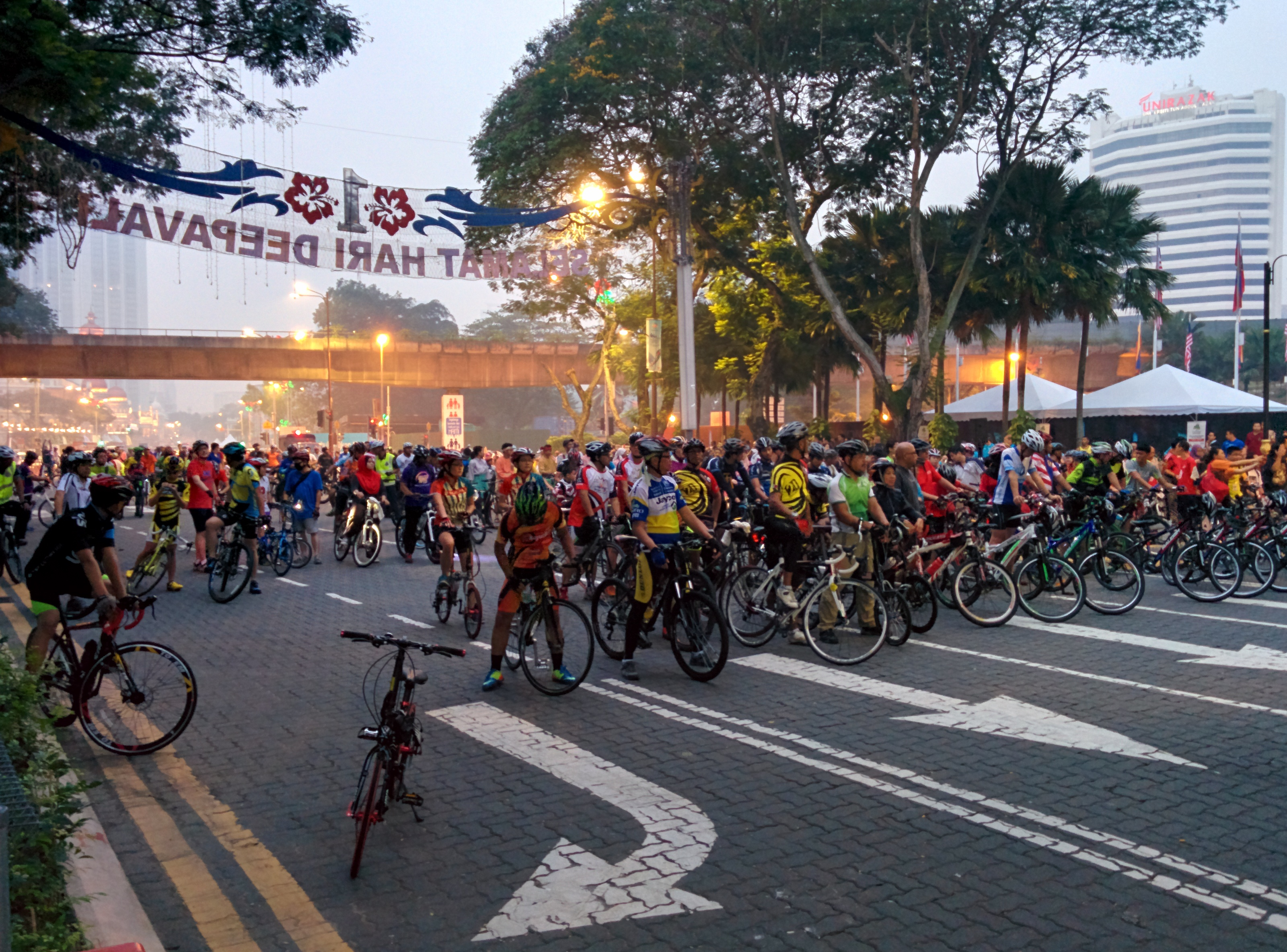
KL Car-Free Morning at Jalan Raja Laut.

In addition to the improvement of the infrastructure, there are notable bicycling events which are held annually or monthly in Kuala Lumpur.

- Cycle Asia Kuala Lumpur^{[a]}
- KL Car-Free Morning (a monthly car-free movement held on every first and third Sunday)^{[a]}
- Tour de Langkawi^{[b]}
- Jelajah Malaysia^{[b]}

Notes

- ^{^[a]}Sponsored by OCBC
- ^{^[a]}Part of UCI Asia Tour

== Popularity and influences ==
Although cycling was used to be the norm transportation methods for mid-class citizen, this however the popularity of cycling has gained momentum from various class of people in Kuala Lumpur due to the usual traffic congestion that often occurs in the city in addition to the increasing price of petroleum, while at the same time people agree that cycling can help them to explore additional places while exercising and easily meet people around. The rising of the bicycling popularity has also benefited the bicycle shop business in Kuala Lumpur that once not being profitable in the past, but however being profitable for now due to the changes of their lifestyle.

The recent opening of the cycling cafe and bicycle-themed coffeehouse is also said to be influenced from bicycle culture in other countries where cyclists gathering at cafe for meetup and planning for next ride while at the same time it is designated for cycling community which is currently emerging. It is also one of the preferred transportation methods for students to go to school from home. Foldable bikes has become one of the popular bikes among the cycling community and its transportation methods in Kuala Lumpur due to its portability, environmental friendly transportation and ability to carry the bicycle to the rapid transit system, with its sales of the foldable bikes roses to 35% between 2010 and 2011.

Brompton is among the most preferred foldable bike brands widely chosen by the customers than any other brands. The growth of the cycling in the region also creates another job opportunity in Kuala Lumpur with the introduction of bike messenger in 2015, which is known as Vélo Express KL, where they responsible for delivering the items through bicycles in the urban area. The team’s aim is to give awareness that cycling can also be used as an alternative transportation to driving or public transportation despite still have lack of bicycle facilities, where one of the member claims that the statement of cycling in Kuala Lumpur is dangerous is false.

Although bike messengers are still new to the city when compared to Indonesia where it already exists, it has already received many delivery requests from employees at office who do not plan to temporary leave the working place during the usual working hours. However, despite the growth of bicycle culture in the area, some of the building management still refused to allow bicycles to enter their building as the security guard looked on bicycles and cyclists around building as suspicious due to the no bicycle policy that is still implemented in some buildings today.
