= Midnight Ridazz =

Midnight Ridazz is a late-night group bicycle ride that celebrates bicycle culture in Los Angeles.

== History ==
Midnight Ridazz began in February, 2004 when six cyclists and two skateboarders in Echo Park took an impromptu tour of the fountains in downtown Los Angeles. The idea of taking a monthly late night group bicycle ride to see interesting and unusual aspects of Los Angeles not ordinarily accessible or meaningfully experienced from an automobile spread quickly by word of mouth, and within several months the group grew to over five times its original size. Before the ride celebrated its first anniversary in February 2005, the monthly turnout had swollen to a hundred riders. As the ride grew, the social and organizational dynamic changed. What had started out as a small gathering of friends had become first a neighborhood and then a citywide phenomenon. Several of the original riders voluntarily took on the responsibility of planning routes, printing route slips for distribution to participants, inventing themes for the rides and publicizing them, and helping riders with mechanical difficulties along the way.

By the summer of 2006, Midnight Ridazz had grown to such an extent that often more than a thousand riders could be expected to show up at the traditional meeting point in the parking lot of the Pioneer Chicken fast-food restaurant on Echo Park Avenue off of Sunset Boulevard. The rapid growth of the ride was beginning to overwhelm the neighborhood where riders met, and perhaps more importantly, it was beginning to overwhelm the organizers. The ride had grown unwieldy; riders were getting lost, altercations and accidents involving riders and frustrated motorists were becoming common, and it was no longer practical to stop the ride to wait for participants with mechanical problems. The organizers' response to this was to step down and allow responsibility for the rides to devolve to the participants, and to encourage splitting Midnight Ridazz from one large monthly ride into several more frequent regional rides. The transition worked remarkably well, due at least in part to the advent of a Midnight Ridazz website with a discussion forum and a ride calendar open to anybody who wished to organize and announce a group ride.

== Culture and ethic ==
Midnight Ridazz is rooted in a punk ethos. It was partly the aim of the original riders and organizers to challenge both the dominant means of transportation and the prevailing mode of entertainment in Los Angeles, a city largely designed around the private automobile and one in which weekend entertainment is widely assumed to involve some kind of commercial transaction. Midnight Ridazz and its most prominent promoters do not overtly claim to be engaging in activism, apart from taking the position that "riding a bicycle in this country in and of itself IS the political act." Ridazz bears some resemblance to the pro-bicycle Critical Mass phenomenon in that both involve large groups of cyclists temporarily taking over city streets in public view. However, it is distinct from Critical Mass in that the routes are planned by self-appointed caretakers, and the atmosphere revolves around party culture and fun rather than political demonstration.

Inclusiveness has long been a dominant cultural component in Midnight Ridazz. Rides are usually planned and paced so as to allow any reasonably healthy adult with a roadworthy bicycle and the ability to ride it to participate. Accordingly, the rides have attracted a wide cross-section of the cycling community in Los Angeles--bicycle messengers, bicycle commuters, utility cyclists, fixed gear enthusiasts, recreational riders, racers, and so on—although the convergence of different groups of cyclists has not been without occasional friction.

Midnight Ridazz has inspired many new regular rides and bicycle groups in the Los Angeles area and has been credited with helping to popularize bicycle ride culture in Los Angeles.

== The Annual All City Toy Ride ==
Starting from December 2006, The Midnight Ridazz have been organizing The All City Toy Ride, a philanthropic bicycle ride. This event is customarily held on the second Friday of December and calls upon participants to contribute a toy worth up to $25 to be given to a local charity. Past beneficiaries of this event include The Los Angeles Department of Child Services, The Los Angeles Fire Department's Spark of Love, The Alliance for Children's Rights, Los Angeles Legal Aid, and the East LA Women's Center. The event consists of several rides, originating from various parts of Los Angeles County.
