= Bicycle culture =

Culture supporting the use of bicycles

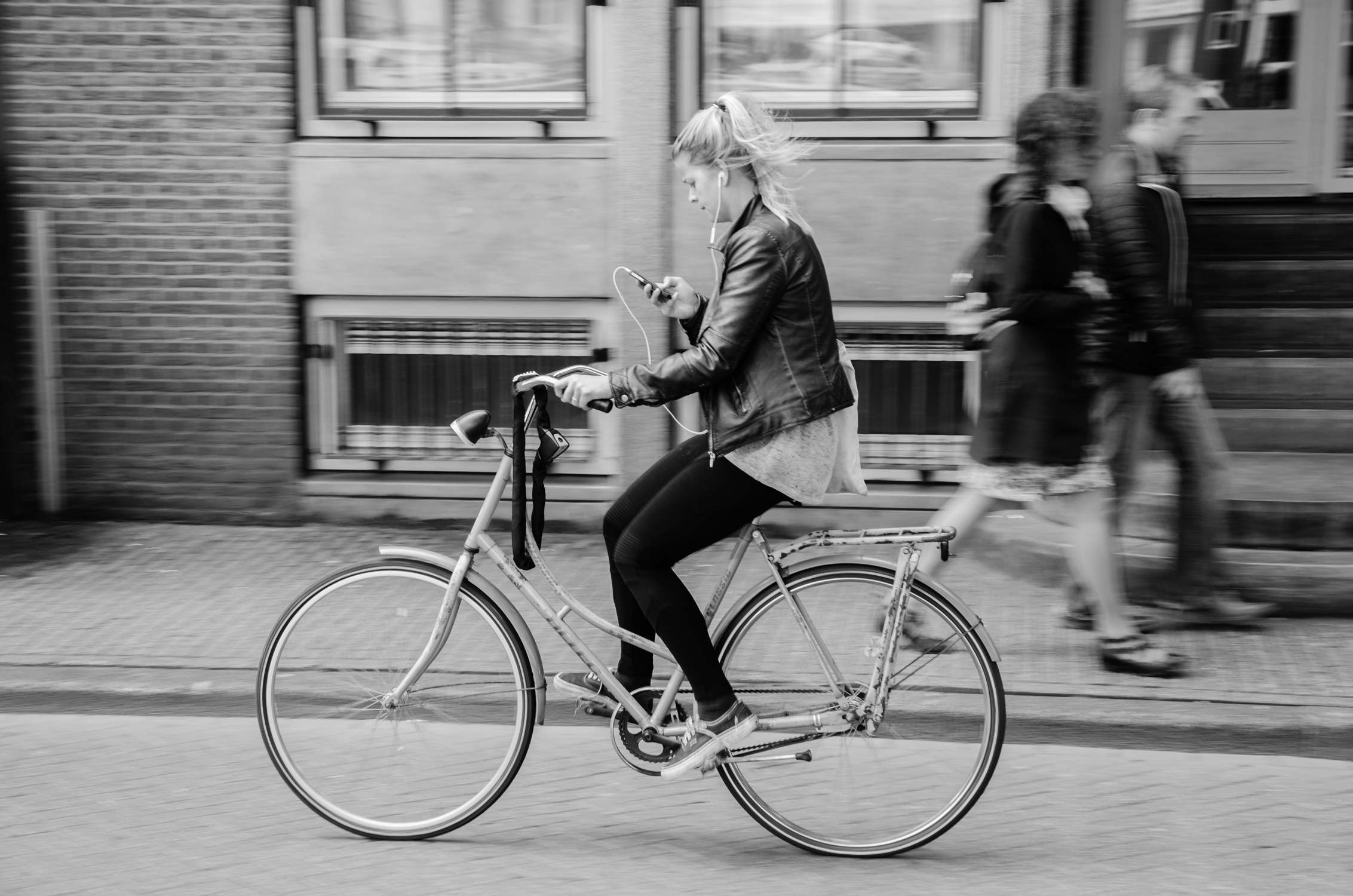
Cycling is the most common form of transit in Amsterdam

Bicycle culture are unwritten rules, social norms, values and infrastructure that support cyclists and shape how cycling takes place. It can refer to a mainstream culture that supports the use of bicycles or to a subculture. Although "bike culture" is often used to refer to various forms of associated fashion, it is erroneous to call fashion in and of itself a culture.

Cycling culture refers to cities and countries which support a large percentage of utility cycling. Examples include the Netherlands, Denmark, Germany, Belgium (Flanders in particular), Sweden, Italy, China, Bangladesh and Japan. There are also towns in some countries where bicycle culture has been an integral part of the landscape for generations, even without much official support. That is the case of Ílhavo, in Portugal. North American cities with strong bicycle cultures include Madison, Portland, San Francisco, Little Rock, Boston, Toronto, Montreal, Lincoln, Peoria, and the Twin Cities. In Latin America, Bogotá is often regarded as one of the most bike-friendly cities.

A city with a strong bicycle culture usually has a well-developed cycling infrastructure, including segregated bike lanes and extensive facilities catering to urban bicycles, such as bike racks.

== History ==
Since the late 19th century, bicycles have been associated with technological and social progress and individual liberation, in particular among the liberal and urban upper- and middle-class citizens who had sufficient means, leisure time and energy to afford to buy and ride it. However, the interpretation and meaning of this association have varied depending on the specific national context. In the Netherlands and Denmark, cycling has become an integral part of people’s daily routine from an early age and of national identity, supported by their pragmatic policies and their strong egalitarian and more consensual ethos. In English-speaking countries and Germany, on the other hand, the spread of the automobile has relegated cycling to a minority or subcultural practice, often perceived as a sign of poverty and low social status. In France, Belgium, Italy, and Spain, cycling culture has developed mainly through sport and professional competitions, such as the Tour de France and the Giro d'Italia, taking on a strong symbolic value but with little impact on everyday transport. Historical and cultural differences between nations have led to the development of distinct national cycling models and the implementation of bicycle promotion policies that vary in effectiveness.

== Advocacy and activism subcultures ==
In some cities and countries, transportation infrastructure is focused on automobiles, and large portions of the population use cars as their only local mechanical transport. Bicycling advocates include those who advocate for an increase in population-wide commuting, acceptance of cycling, and legislation and infrastructure to promote and protect the safety and rights of cyclists.

Cycling advocacy often aims to improve community bike infrastructure, including aspects such as bike lanes, parking facilities, and access to public transportation.

Within the cycling community, activism may take many forms, and may include creative and practical approaches. These include bike-related music, bike-related films, international exchange of hospitality (Warm Showers), organized bike rides (often noncompetitive—i.e. Critical Mass and World Naked Bike Ride), art bikes displays, printed-word materials (such as blogs, zines and magazines, stickers, and spoke cards), and the publication and distribution of books (such as: Thomas Stevens's Around the World on a Bicycle, Mark Twain's essay "Taming the Bicycle" and H. G. Wells's novel The Wheels of Chance). There are hundreds of bicycle cooperatives offering spaces for cyclists to replace their own bikes and socialise.

=== Examples ===
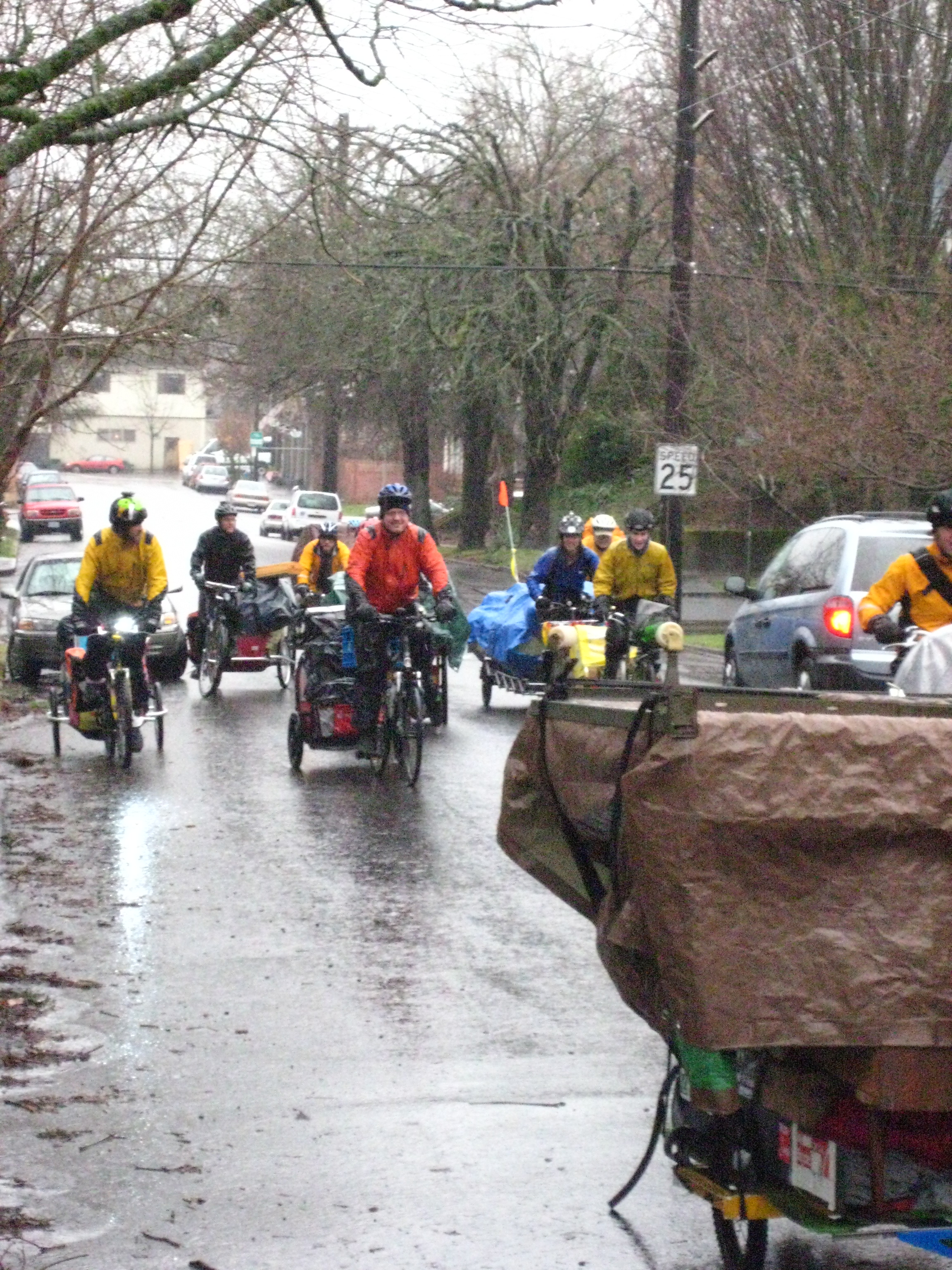
Cyclists in Portland, Oregon, move the contents of a house to demonstrate how bikes can be used for large tasks

Many cities contain subcultures of bicycle enthusiasts that include racers, bicycle messengers, bicycle transportation activists, mutant bicycle fabricators, bicycle mechanics, and bicycle commuters. Some such groups are affiliated with activism or counterculture groups. These hybrid groups often organize activities such as competitive cycling, fun rides, protests, and civil disobedience, such as Critical Mass. Some groups work to promote bicycle transportation (community bicycle program); others fix bicycles to give to children or the homeless (Bikes Not Bombs). There are also feminist groups of women of color who promote the empowerment of women through their rides such as Ovarian Psycos.

Bicycle magazines and organizations give awards to cities for being "bicycle friendly". Examples include Boulder, Minneapolis, Austin, Philadelphia, Madison, Seattle, and Portland—all cities that promote bicycle culture.

Midnight Ridazz is a group of bicycle enthusiasts who ride every second Friday of the month in Los Angeles, California to inspire more people to ride bicycles. Rides often exceed 1,000 cyclists. Similar midnight rides such as the Midnight Mystery rides of Portland and Victoria, the bi-monthly Midnight Mass of Vancouver BC, and similar rides across the US and Europe have been growing in popularity.

San Jose Bike Party is another example of a large monthly social ride that regularly exceeds a thousand riders. It occurs on third Fridays of each month after the evening commute. Typically there are two regroup points allowing slower riders to catch up, which include music and food trucks.

== Mainstream bike cultures ==
Cycling is the norm in countries like the Netherlands and Denmark. In Denmark, 16 percent of all trips are made by bike—and as much as 50 percent of urban populations cycle to work and school. In the Netherlands, 63 percent of Amsterdam residents ride their bikes every day. Strong cycling infrastructure helps encourage cycling in these cities, and so cycling is the fastest, most convenient way to get from one place to another.

Mainstream bike cultures are characterized by notions of function over form. In mainstream bike cultures, there is less of a differentiation between cyclists and the rest of the population. People of all demographics cycle regularly, and most are less concerned about cycling attire and bike performance. It is not uncommon to see people cycle in business attire or on an old rusty bike.

== See also ==
- Cycling ecosystem
- Cycling mobility
- Cyclability
- Bicycle Film Festival
- Bicycle-friendly
- Car-free movement
- Critical Mass
- International Cycling Film Festival
- Cycling in Denmark
- Cycling in the Netherlands
- History of cycling
- List of films about bicycles and cycling
- Cycling infrastructure
- Cycle touring
- Utility cycling
- Mamil
