= Spoke card =

Card placed in the spokes of a bicycle wheel

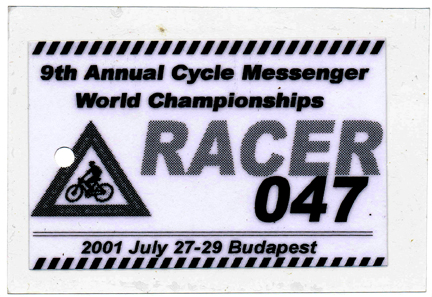
Racer spoke card from the Cycle Messenger World Championships, Budapest, Hungary, 2001

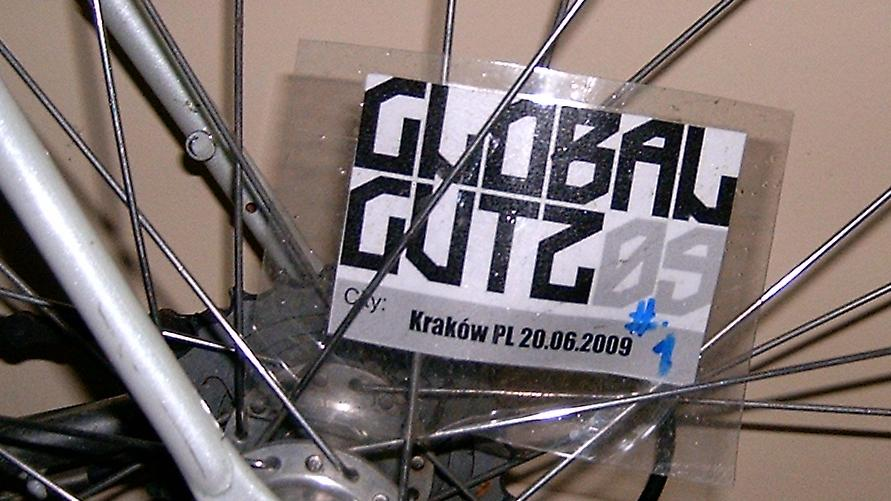
Spoke card from Global Gutz alleycat from Kraków, Poland, 2009

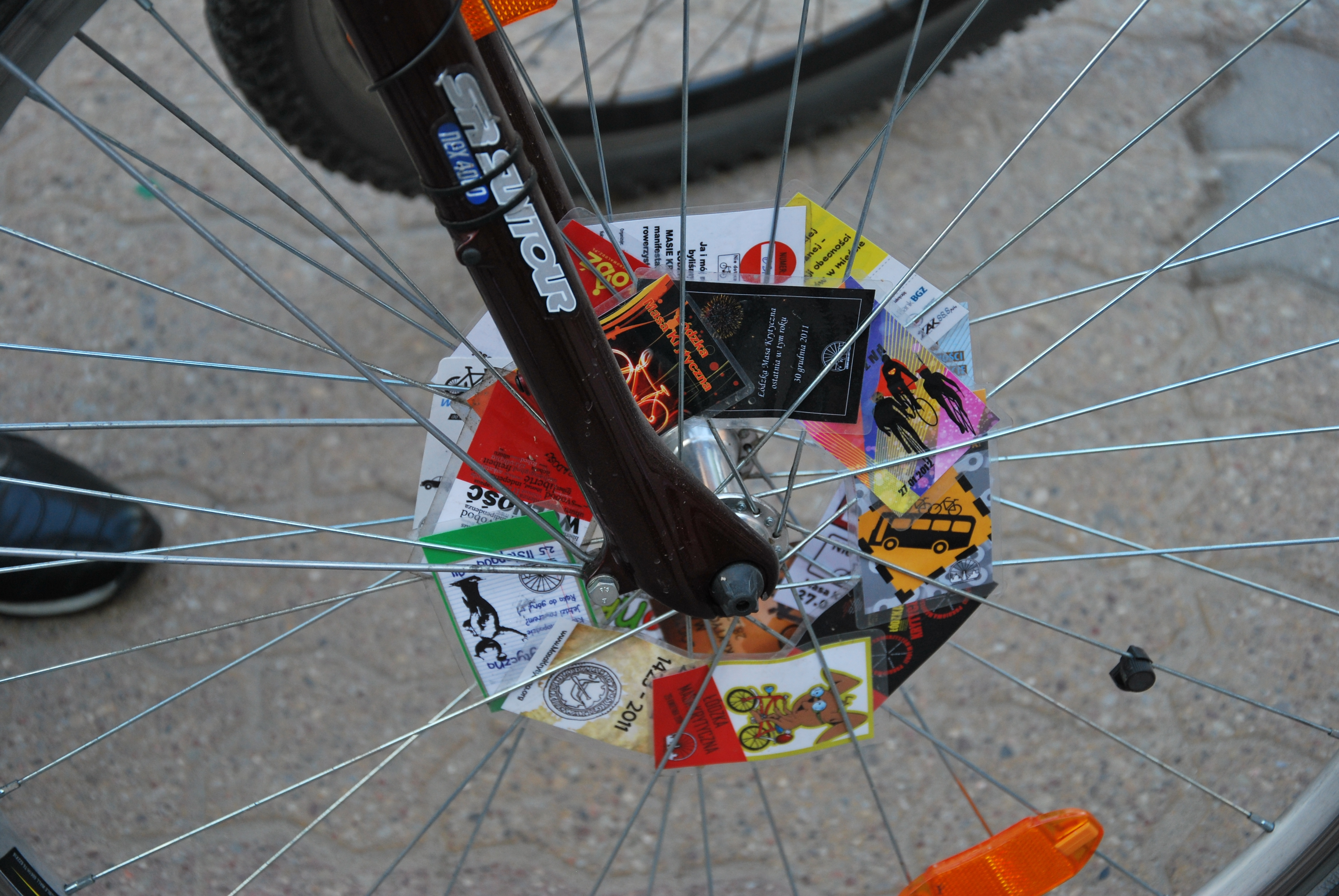
Spoke cards from Critical Mass in Łódź, Poland, 2013

A spoke card, or spokecard, is a card placed in the spokes of a bicycle wheel. They lie parallel to the entire wheel. Most spoke cards are laminated.

Throughout the 20th century, playing cards were placed in such a way as to make a noise as the card flaps against the spokes; however, there is no evidence that these were called "spoke cards."

== Origins ==
One origin of the spoke card was laminated cards inserted in spokes with numbers used to identify competitors in competitive races held by bicycle messengers, in official competitions and in unofficial alleycat races. Tarot cards with the racers number written on them were used initially, but nowadays cards are often custom printed.

Another influence was the practice of placing playing cards found on the street in bicycle spokes in a game known in 1990s San Francisco as Spokepoker.

== Uses ==
The spoke card is wedged between the spokes of the wheel at the point where they cross each other. Although the spoke card is hard to read while the bicycle is in motion, it provides a cheap way to label them in the absence of a proper race number plaque under the top tube, and is less likely to attract the attention of the authorities than a number on the rider's back.

Maps for social bicycle rides have been printed on spokecards for the riders' reference.

Many messengers retain spoke cards after the event, accumulating several on the wheel. Other city riders sometimes fix spoke cards to their wheels as an affectation of messenger culture. Many times participants of large group rides, such as those organized by groups like the Midnight Ridazz, Critical Mass and Social Cycling NYC receive spoke cards and affix them to their spokes.

Spoke cards have evolved to serve such diverse functions as memorials for fallen messengers, as artwork, and as political placards in bike messenger association elections, and even in the 2008 United States presidential election.

Author Dan Goldwater advocates using spoke cards as advertising fliers, however, this can be controversial since many cyclists do not appreciate strangers touching their bicycles, and spoke cards end up easily as litter on the streets.

Bike Index, a bike registration service, provides instructions for printing spoke cards with QR codes that contain information about the particular bicycle and its registration.
