= Cycling ecosystem =

Set of physical, social and cultural elements that favor the use of bicycles

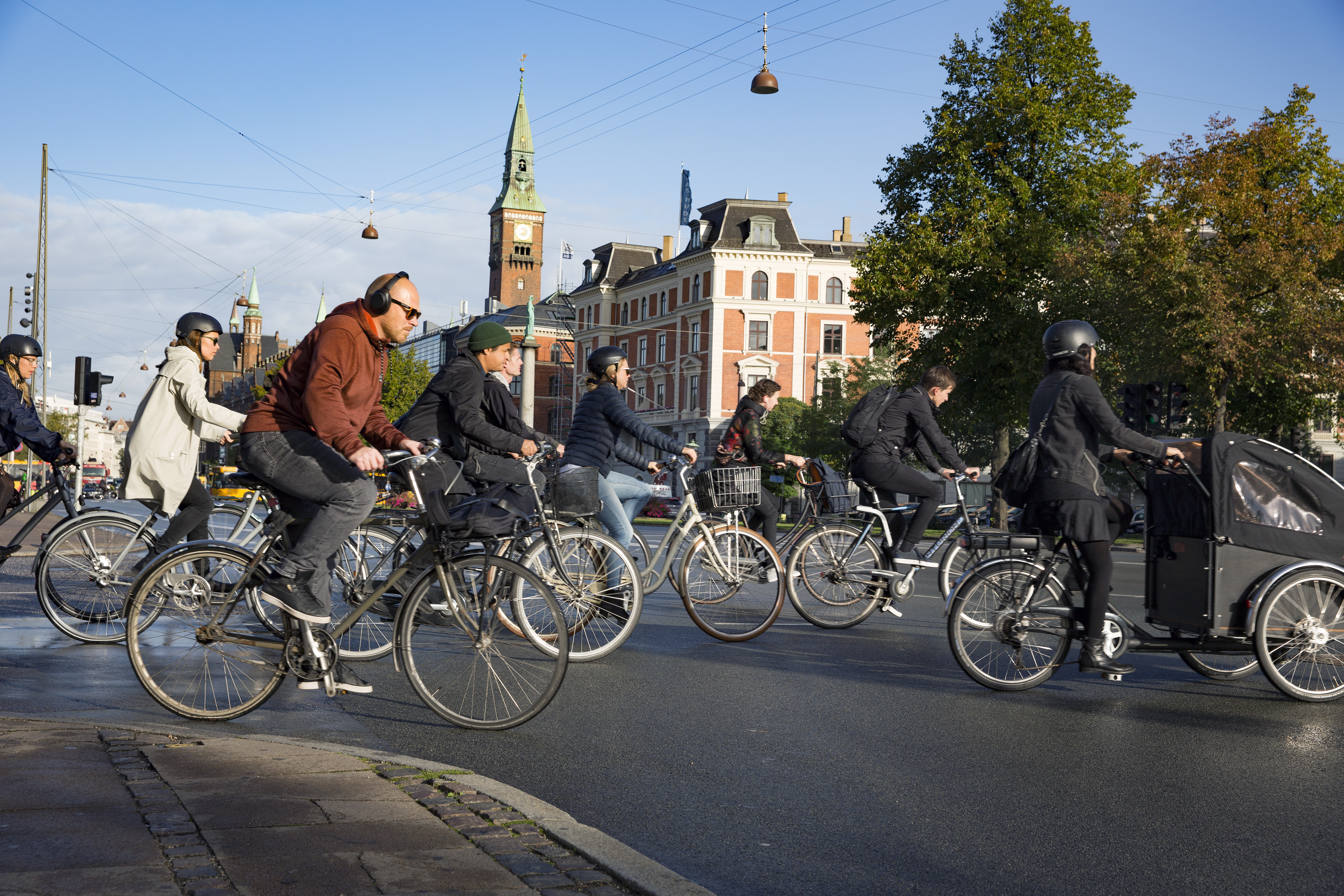
As in biological ecosystems, where the level of maturity is linked both to the physical environment and to high biodiversity, in a developed cycling ecosystem infrastructure is integrated with the everyday use of bicycles. This integration encourages the emergence of diverse forms of urban cycling and promotes inclusive access, making it easier for people of different ages, abilities, and genders to use bicycles.

A cycling ecosystem refers to the set of associated infrastructures and services, such as cycling networks, parking facilities, shops, repair shops, and integration with other modes of transport; the actors directly involved, such as cyclists, cycling organizations, and companies in the sector; institutional frameworks, including public policies, legislation, and the degree of involvement of public administrations; sociocultural factors, such as social attitudes, cultural elements, and common practices among the population; as well as technological components, such as applications, electrification solutions, and new bicycle designs. Together, these elements interact and shape the environment in which cycling develops as a means of daily transport, a recreational activity, or a sport. This concept highlights the interdependence among all these components, which facilitate, regulate, and promote cycling within a given territory or community.

In the field of urban planning and active mobility, the cycling ecosystem is used as an analytical tool to assess the level of cycling development in a given area. Its study makes it possible to identify strengths and shortcomings in infrastructure provision, service availability, institutional support, and the social integration of cycling. It also underscores the importance of coordination among the different components of the system, as their balanced development is key to fostering safe, accessible, and widespread bicycle use. This comprehensive approach helps guide strategies and policies aimed at promoting cycling mobility and improving urban quality of life.

== See also ==
- Urban anthropology
- Bicycle culture
- Cyclability
