= Ovarian Psycos =

Bicycle brigade

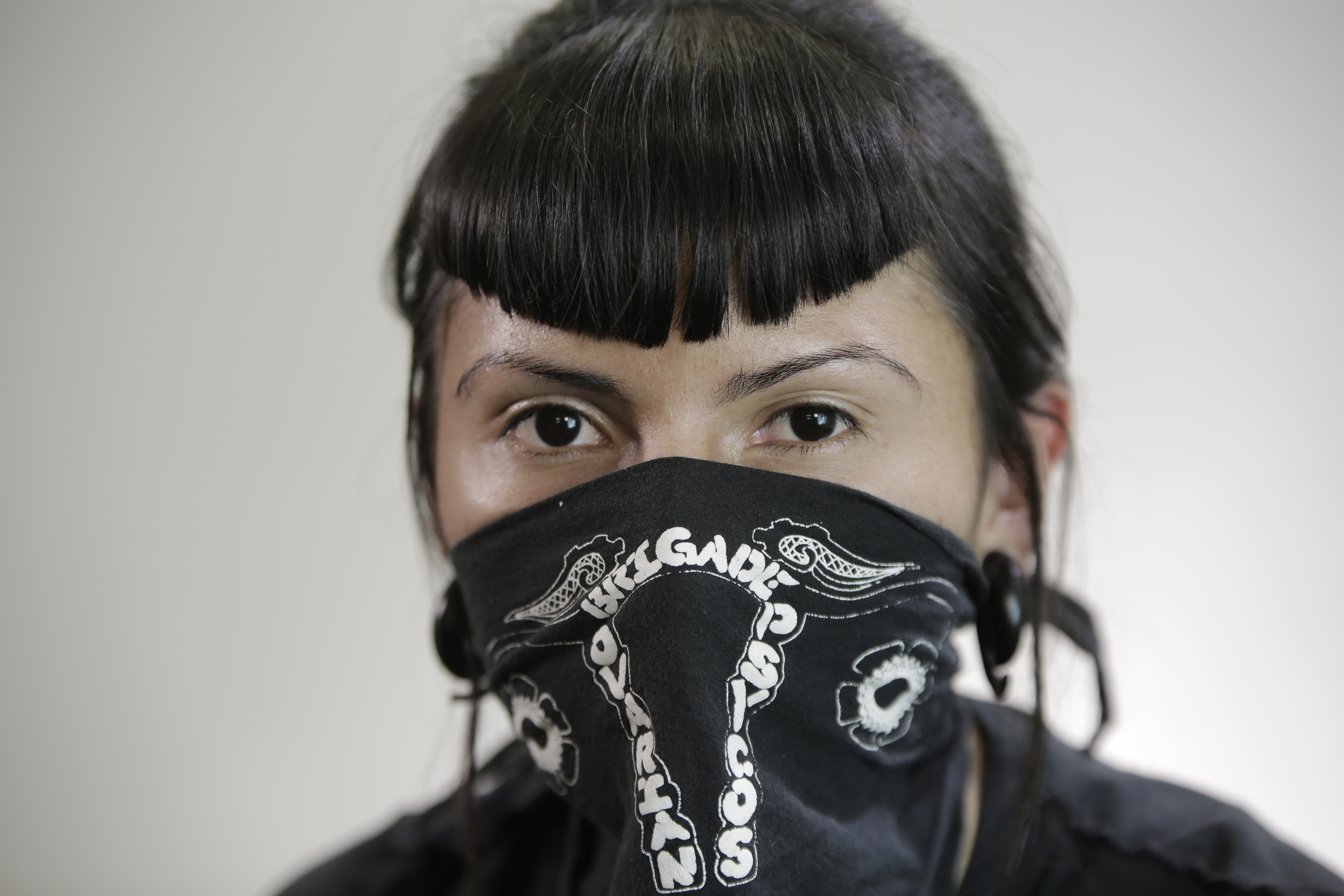
Joss the Boss on a screening of the documentary in Mexico.

Ovarian Psycos is a bicycle brigade established in Boyle Heights, Los Angeles, in 2010. The group was formed to foster sisterhood that could feel comfortable taking up space as well confronting the harassment of women. Rides are organized monthly on the full moon. A documentary by Joanna Sokolowski and Kate Trumbull-LaValle premiered in 2016 at SXSW and was screened on March 27, 2017 on the KCET Independent Lens program.
