= Utility cycling =

Bicycling as transportation

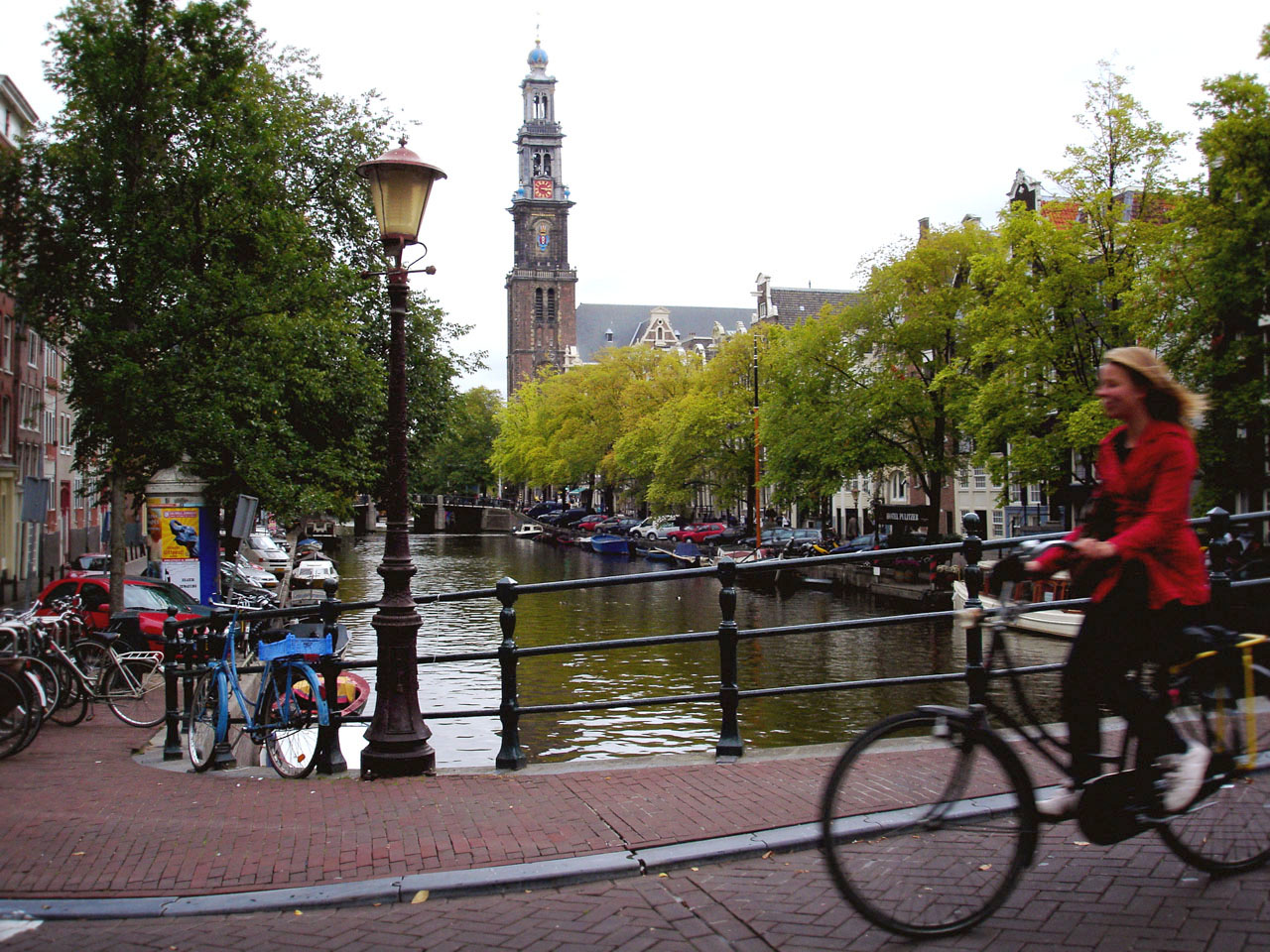
Cycling in Amsterdam

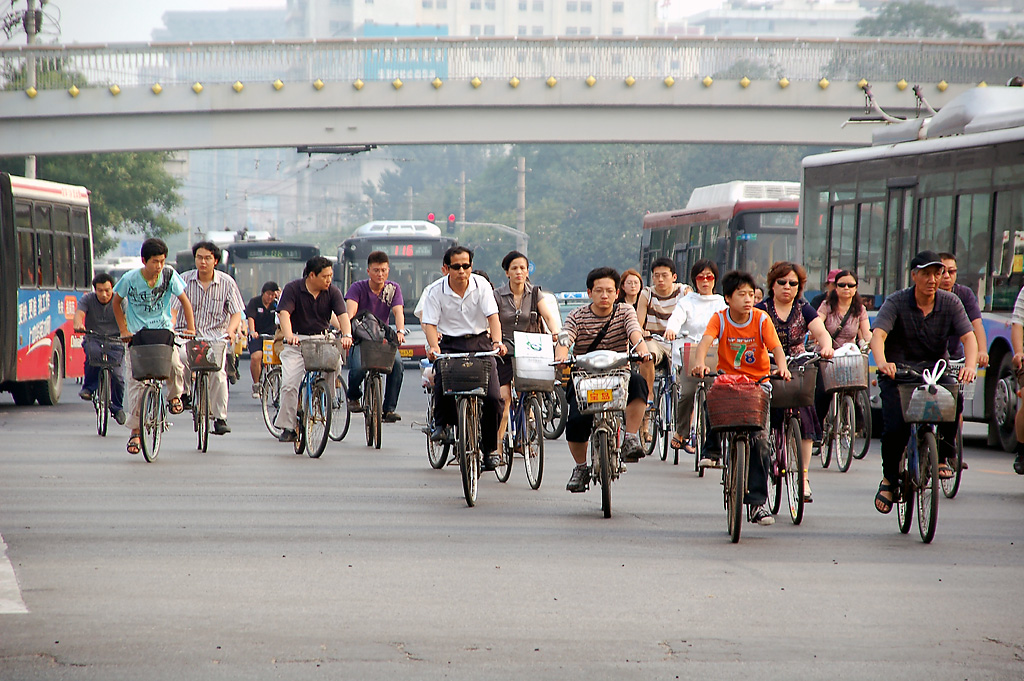
Bike riders in Beijing

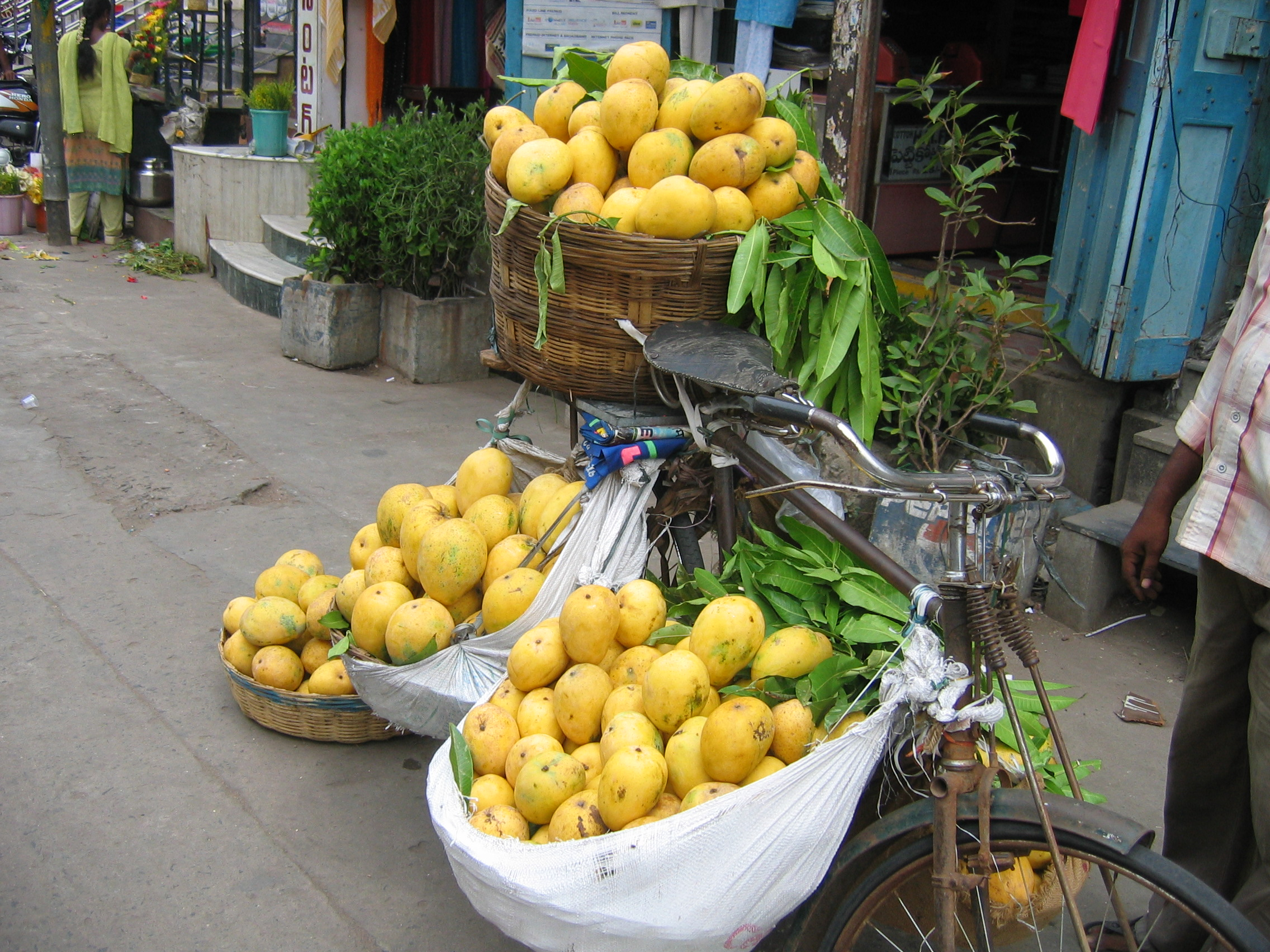
Mangoes for sale loaded on a bicycle in Guntur, India

Utility cycling encompasses any cycling done simply as a means of transport rather than as a sport or leisure activity. It is the original and most common type of cycling in the world. Cycling mobility is one of the various types of private transport and a major part of individual mobility.

== Overview ==
Copenhagen inner city cycle traffic peak hour

Utility or "transportational" cycling generally involves traveling short and medium distances (several kilometres, not uncommonly 3–15 kilometres one way, or somewhat longer), often in an urban environment. It includes commuting (i.e. going to work, school or university), going shopping and running errands, as well as heading out to see friends and family or for other social activities.

It also includes economic activity such as the delivering of goods or services. In cities, the bicycle courier is often a familiar feature, and cargo bikes are capable of competing with trucks and vans particularly where many small deliveries are required, especially in congested areas. Velotaxis can also provide a public transport service like buses and taxicabs.

Utility cycling is known to have several social and economic benefits. Policies that encourage utility cycling have been proposed and implemented for reasons including: improved public health, individual health and employers' profits, a reduction in traffic congestion and air pollution, improvements in road traffic safety, improved quality of life, improved mobility and social inclusiveness, and benefits to child development.

In the Chinese city of Beijing alone, there are an estimated four million bicycles in use (it has been estimated that in the early-1980s there were approximately 500 million cyclists in China). As of 2000, there were an estimated 80 million bicycles in Japan, accounting for 17% of commuter trips, and in the Netherlands, 27% of all trips are made by bicycle.

Cycling has been considered

[in] economic and social terms, [influencing] or [impacting] upon transport, mobility, environment and climate change, the economy and tourism. ... As a means of transport over short distances, cycling brings certain economic, environmental and health-related benefits.

— European Parliament Think Tank

Cycling mobility can be contrasted with mass automobility for which it is an immediate competitor in cities and for shorter distances.

Cities are a hotbed for experimenting with new bicycle-based forms of mobility like bicycle sharing, electric bicycles and transport of bulky goods with cargo bikes. After decades of relative stagnation in bicycle development, new technologies and materials are tried to further improve upon the environmental footprint of the bicycle. Even though it is recognized that cycling - the one foremost active mobility besides walking - is the most sustainable kind of mobility and means of transportation, in some countries, cycling is still the mode of transport for the poor; in others, cycling is seen fit only for leisure purposes. In a 2010 document requested by the European Parliament Committee on Transport and Tourism that mobility not only entails the ability to travel, but also encompasses, more importantly, the possibility for the traveller to decide when and where to travel. In terms of this flexibility and cost, bicycles rank among the top choices for shorter distances, up to several kilometers.

== History ==
The development of the safety bicycle was arguably the most important change in the history of the bicycle. It shifted their use and public perception from being a dangerous toy for sporting young men to being an everyday transport tool for men—and, crucially, women—of all ages. By the start of the 20th century, cycling had become an important means of transportation, and in the United States an increasingly popular form of recreation. Bicycling clubs for men and women spread across the U.S. and across European countries. Cycling steadily became more important in Europe over the first half of the twentieth century, but it dropped off dramatically in the United States between 1900 and 1910, and automobiles became the preferred means of transportation. Similarly in China where ownership rates peaked at more than one per household by 1990 and then declined. Over the 1920s, bicycles gradually became considered children's toys, and by 1940 most bicycles in the United States were made for children, however the number of bikes continued to increase.

In 2008, the Bicycle Commuter Benefit Act became law as part of the bailout bill. According to census data, men are the primary beneficiaries, since, a decade later, men overwhelmingly made up the majority of bicycle commuters. For most of the twentieth century, the great majority of cycling in the UK took place on roads. Cycling is one of the modes of transport for student transport.

== The bicycle and the cyclist's equipment ==
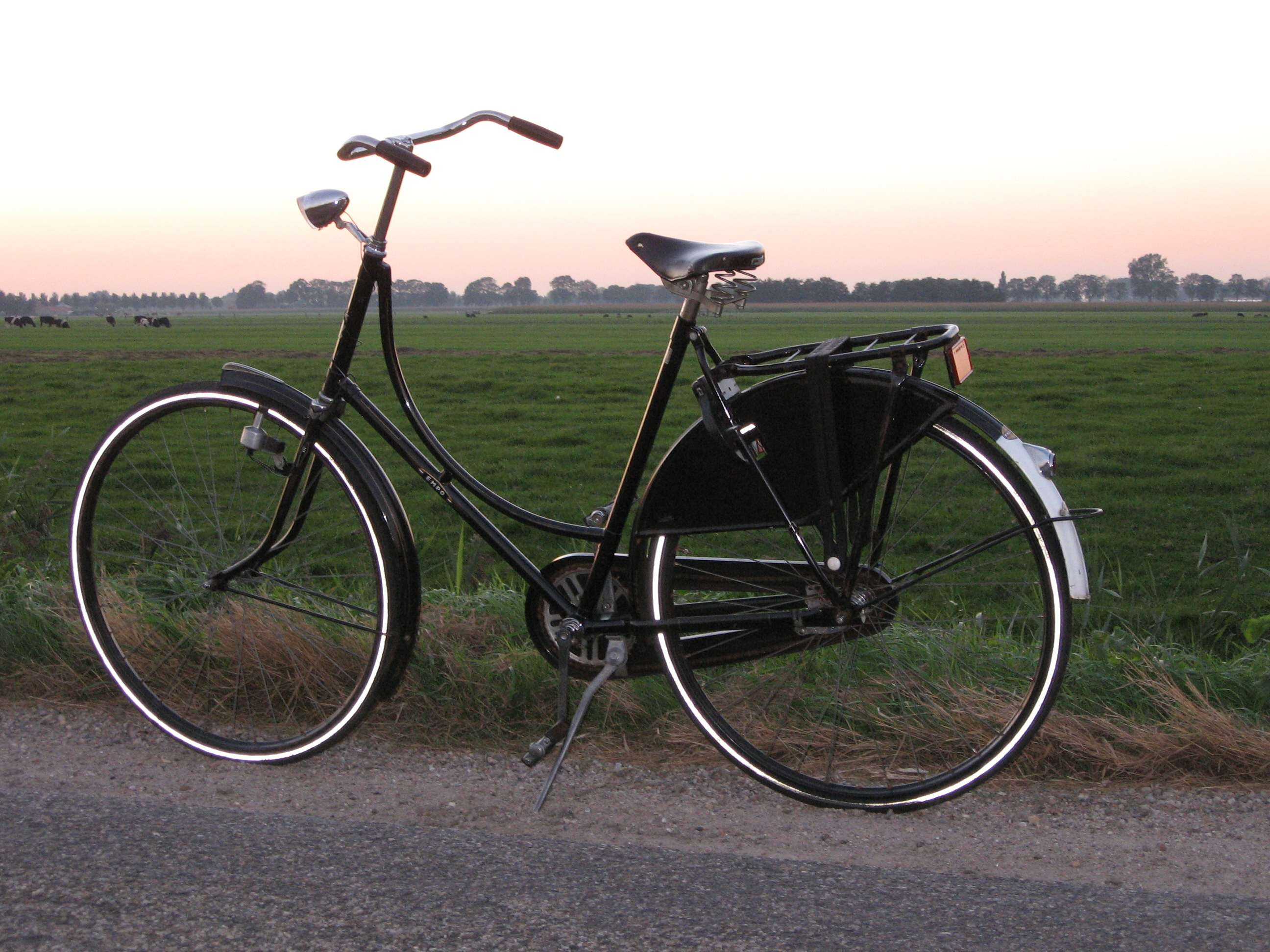
A traditional Dutch omafiets utility bicycle with chain guard, skirt guard, ring lock, dynamo light, luggage carrier, fenders, step-through frame, kickstand, and upright riding position

Utility bicycles have many standard features to enhance their usefulness and comfort. Chain guards and mudguards, or fenders, protect clothes and moving parts from oil and spray. Skirt guards prevent long coats, skirts, and other trailing clothes and items catching in the wheel. Kickstands help with parking. Front-mounted wicker or steel baskets for carrying goods are often used. Rear luggage carriers can be used to carry items such as school satchels.

Panniers or special luggage carriers (including waterproof packing bags) enable the transport of goods and are used for shopping. Parents sometimes add rear-mounted child seats and/or an auxiliary saddle fitted to the crossbar to transport children. Trailers of various types and load capacities may be towed to greatly increase cargo capacity. In many jurisdictions bicycles must be fitted with a bell; reflectors; and, after dark, front and rear lights.

The use by cyclists of vests or armbands fluorescent in daylight or reflective at night can increase a cyclist's conspicuity, although these are not an alternative to a legally compliant lighting system. A report on the promotion of walking and cycling (Hydén, et al., 1999) discussed safety clothing and equipment and stated that "there is no doubt that both pedestrian reflectors and bicycle helmets are reducing the injury risk of their users quite considerably", although this assertion is not universally accepted.

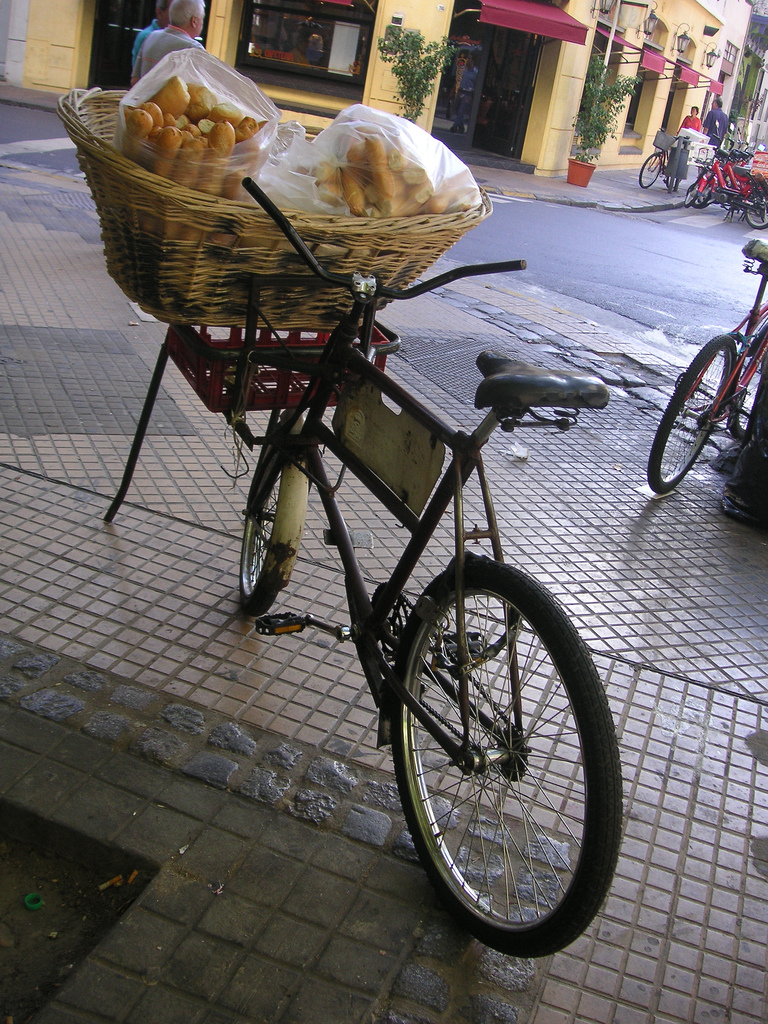
A delibike in Buenos Aires delivering bread

== Factors that influence levels of utility cycling ==
Many different factors combine to influence levels of utility cycling. In developing economies, a large amount of utility cycling may be seen simply because the bicycle is the most affordable form of vehicular transport available to many people. In wealthier countries, where people can have the choice of a mixture of transport types, a complex interplay of other factors influences the level of bicycle use. In emerging economies and middle-income countries many people ambition to own cars, resulting in less cycling, more air pollution, and worse health.

Factors affecting cycling levels may include: town planning (including quality of infrastructure: cyclist "friendly" vs. cyclist "hostile"), trip-end facilities (particularly secure parking), retail policy, marketing the public image of cycling, integration with other transport modes, cycle training, terrain (hilly vs. flat), distance to destinations, levels of motorized transport and climate as well as cost. In developed countries cycling has to compete with, and work with, alternative transport modes such as private cars, public transport and walking. Thus cycling levels are not influenced just by the attractiveness of cycling alone, but also by what makes the competing modes more or less attractive.

In developed countries with high utility cycling levels, utility cyclists tend to undertake relatively short journeys. According to Irish 1996 Census data, over 55% of cycling workers travelled 3 miles (4.8 km) or less, 27% 5 miles (8 km) or less and only 17% travelled more than 5 miles in their daily commute. It can be argued that factors that directly influence trip length or journey time are among the most important in making cycling a competitive transport mode. Car ownership rates can also be influential. In New York City, more than half of all households do not own a car (the figure is even higher in Manhattan, over 75%), and walk/bicycle modes of travel account for 21% of all modes for trips in the city. E-bike use was shown to increase the distance cycled for commuting as well as the amount of physical activity among E-bike users in seven European cities.

Decisions taken by various levels of government, as well as local groups, residents' organizations and public- and private-sector employers, can all affect the so-called "modal choice" or "modal split" in daily transport. In some cases, various factors may be manipulated in a manner that deliberately seeks to encourage or discourage various transport modes, including cycling.

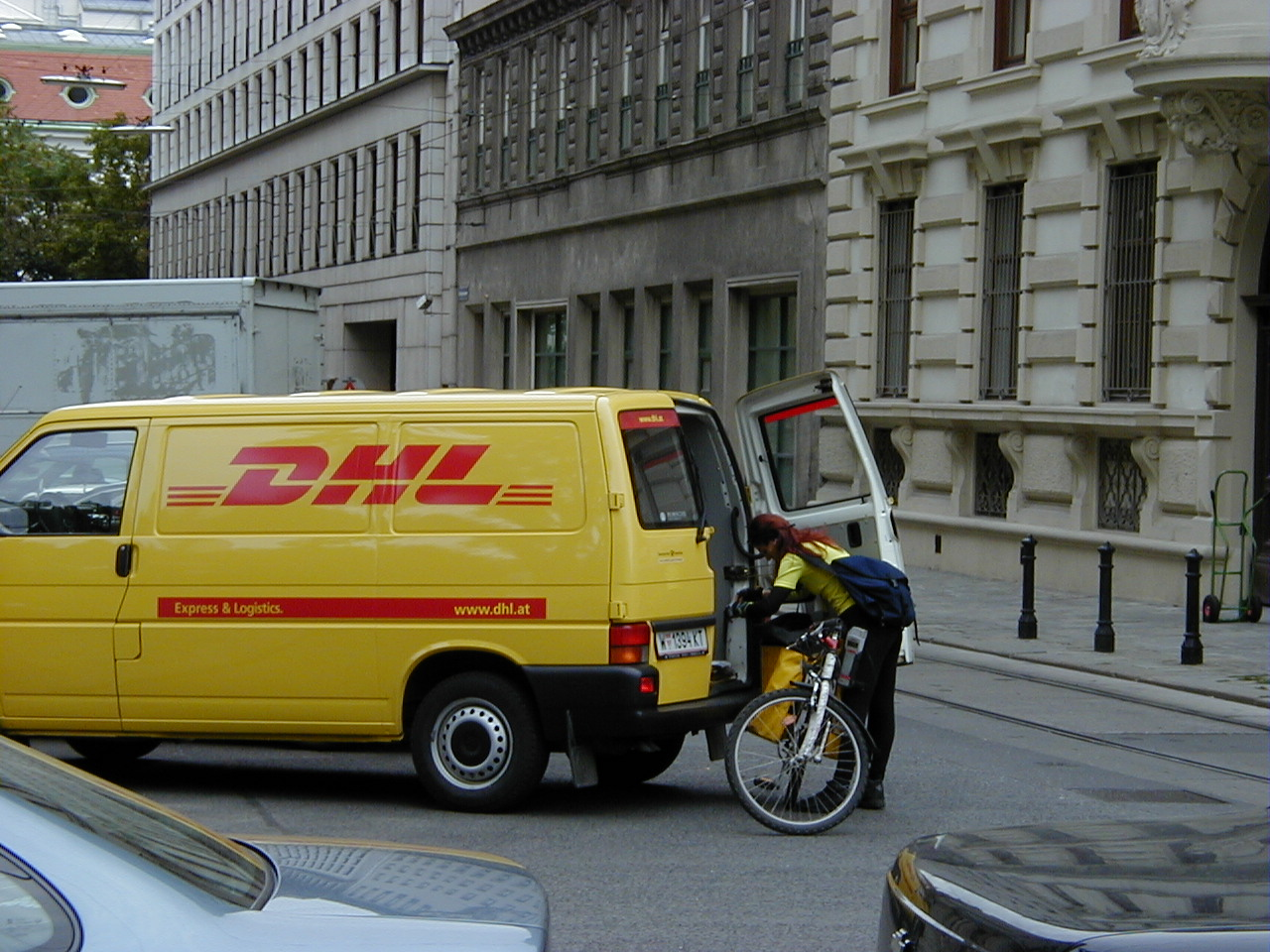
Last kilometer distribution using a bicycle in Vienna, Austria

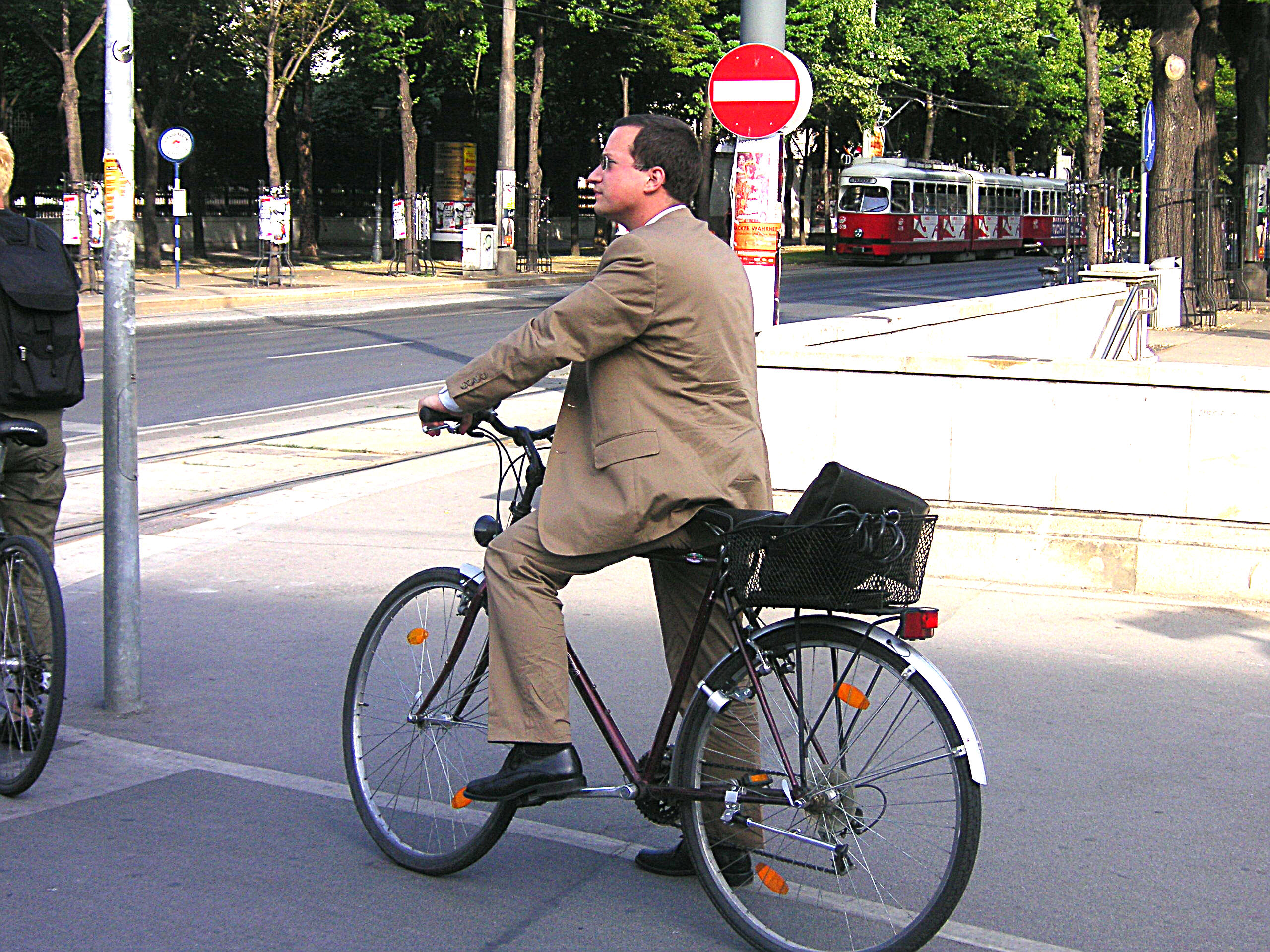
Ringstraße, Vienna, Austria, 2005

The League of American Bicyclists has designated a set of five criteria for evaluating the friendliness of a town or city to bicycles. These criteria are classified under the headings of: Engineering, Encouragement, Evaluation and Planning, Education, Enforcement.

=== Town planning ===
Trip length and journey times are key factors affecting cycle use. Town planning has a decisive effect on key destinations, schools, shops, colleges, health clinics, public transport interchanges and so on remain within a reasonable cycling distance of the areas where people live. The urban form can influence these issues, compact and circular settlement patterns tending to promote cycling. Alternatively, the low-density, non-circular (i.e., linear) settlement patterns characteristic of urban sprawl tends to discourage cycling. In 1990, the Dutch adopted the "ABC" guidelines, specifically limiting developments that are major attractants to locations that are readily accessible by non-car users.

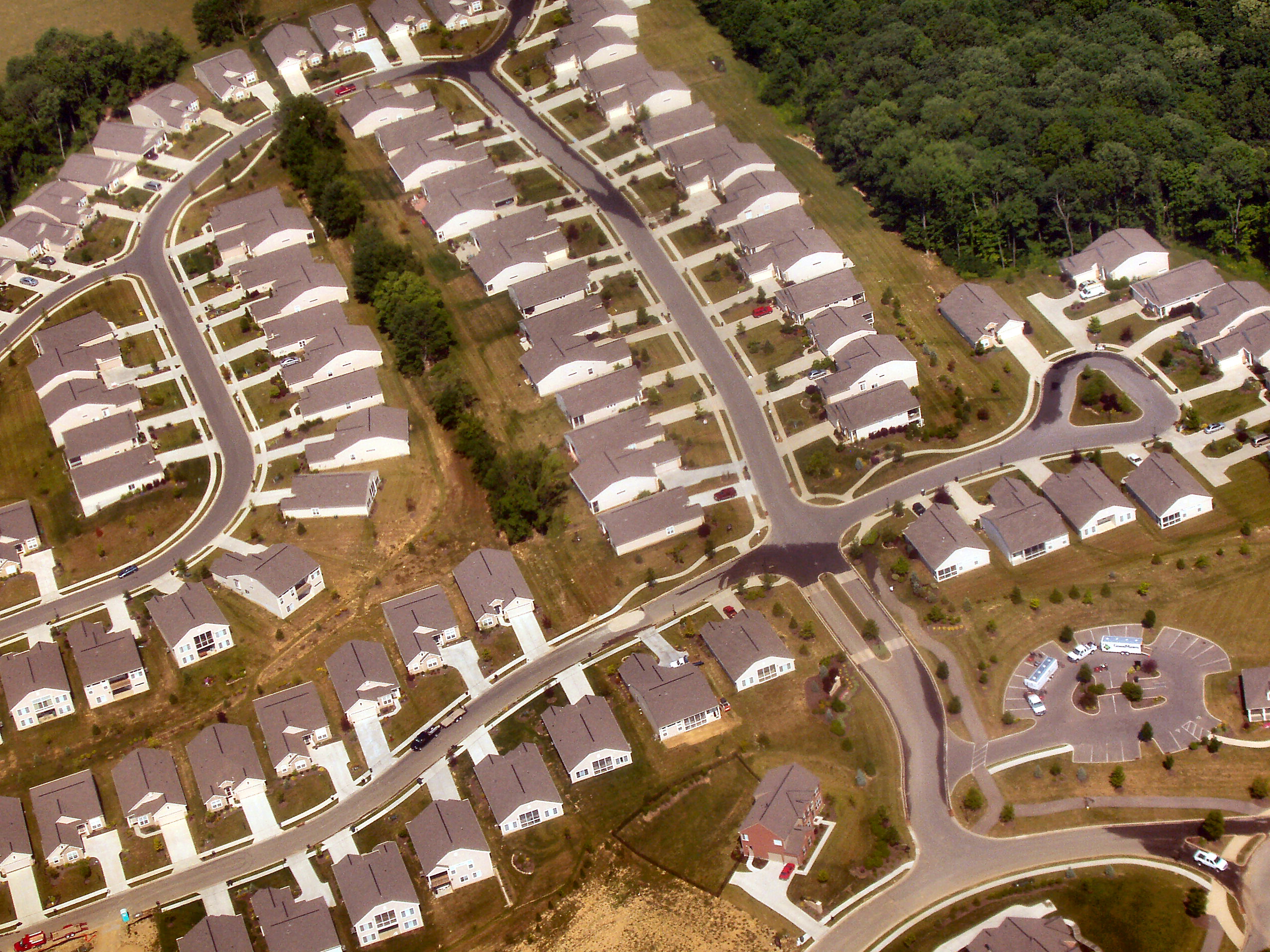
Tract housing is a type of housing development often criticized by city planners and architects due to poor cyclability and walkability, and long distances to necessities such as local employment, commerce, services or attractions, necessitating car dependency.

Settlements that provide a dense road network consisting of interconnected streets tend to be viable utility cycling environments. By contrast, other communities may use a cul-de-sac based, housing estate/housing subdivision model where minor roads are disconnected and only feed into a street hierarchy of progressively more "arterial" type roads. Such communities may discourage cycling by imposing unnecessary detours and forcing all cyclists onto arterial roads, which may be perceived as busy and dangerous, for all trips regardless of destination or purpose.

There is evidence that people who live in such estates are heavier than people who live in places where walking and cycling are more convenient. It is also reported that the extra motor-traffic such communities generate tends to increase overall per-capita traffic casualty rates. Designs that propose to resolve the contradiction between the cul-de-sac and the traditional interconnected network, such as the fused grid, have been proposed and built with varying levels of success. Particular issues have arisen with personal security and public order problems in some housing schemes using "back alley" or "back garden" type links. The UK Manual for Roads (2007) states: "The basic tenet is 'public fronts and private backs'. Ideally, and certainly, in terms of crime prevention, back gardens should adjoin other back gardens or a secure communal space. ... If streets are bounded by back-garden fences or hedges, security problems can increase, drivers may be encouraged to speed, land is inefficiently used, and there is a lack of a sense of place."

== Cycling infrastructure ==
Cycling infrastructure attempts to maximise cyclists safety against the other road users. The risk of collision with other road users remains high due to speed differences and poor visibility. Infrastructure such as segregated cycle lanes, advance stop lines, cycle routes and networks, roundabout design, speed management, and the use of colour all provide varying degrees of separation and protection from other road users. There is, however, a lack of published evidence identifying a change in rates of collisions after implementation of cycling infrastructure.

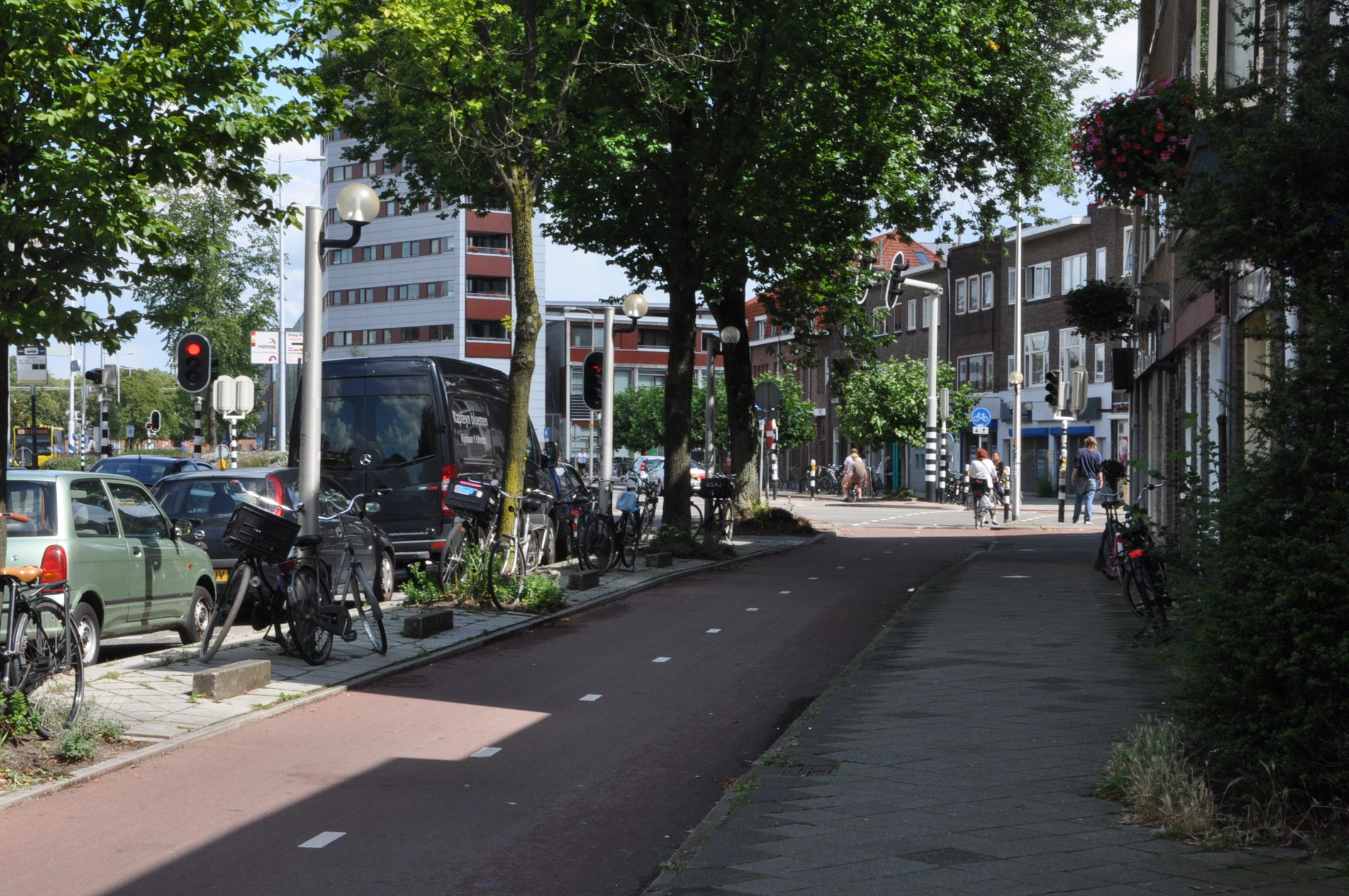
A bikeway, reserved for bicycles specifically, as seen in Utrecht in the Netherlands. The Fietspad averts conflicts with motorized traffic and safeguards utility cycling.

Cycling is a common mode of transport in the Netherlands, with 36% of the people listing the bicycle as their most frequent mode of transport on a typical day (Note: Up from 31% naming the bike their main mode of transport for daily activities in 2011.) as opposed to the car by 45% and public transport by 11%. Cycling has a modal share of 27% of all trips (urban and rural) nationwide.

This high modal share for bicycle travel is enabled by unusually flat topography, cycling infrastructure such as cycle paths, cycle tracks, protected intersections, ample bicycle parking and by making cycling routes shorter, quicker and more direct than car routes.

In the countryside, a growing number of inter-city bicycle paths connect the Netherlands' villages, towns and cities: some of these paths are part of the Dutch National Cycle Network, a network of routes for bicycle tourism which reaches all corners of the nation.

In cities modal share for bicycles is even higher, such as Amsterdam which has 38%.

Cycling infrastructure attempts to maximise cyclists safety against the other road users. There is, however, a lack of published evidence identifying a change in rates of collisions after implementation of cycling infrastructure. In their programmes for the parliamentary elections, almost all Dutch political parties add paragraphs in which they vow to enhance facilities for bicycle commuting. The political party GroenLinks even promotes a principle called "Groen Reizen" (green travelling), in which the choice to use bicycles and public transportation plays a key role.

== Marketing: the public image of cycling ==
As with other activities, cycling can be promoted by marketing. Promotors may include official agencies and authorities.

=== Positive marketing of cycling ===
Two themes predominate in cycling promotion 1) the benefits for the cyclist and 2) the benefits for society and the environment that may occur if more people choose to cycle. The benefits for the cyclist tend to focus issues like reduced journey times in congested urban conditions and the health benefits which the cyclist obtains through regular exercise. Societal benefits focus on general environmental and public health issues. Promotional messages and tactics may include:

- financial savings on transportation
- keeping travel times predictable; in peak traffic, cycling can be the fastest way of moving around town
- ensuring best use of the space available (during trips and also while parked), therefore reducing congestion on the roads
- reminding people of the advantages in terms of health and of effectiveness of using the bicycle
- making maps of journeys that can be completed by bicycle
- reduction of CO_{2} and harmful emissions by fewer people driving motor vehicles
- reducing demand for oil-based fuels
- the safety in numbers effect if more people cycle
- reduced noise pollution in urban areas
- amusement
- cyclist health
  - lowering the risk of cardiovascular disease (when practised for more than a quarter of an hour a day at a moderate pace) and therefore improvement of individual and public health
  - using cycling to tackle the obesity crisis facing rich countries
  - the financial savings for society if general health improves

Further following positive aspects are:

- transport efficiency - cycling is the fastest and most flexible mode for 'door to door' travel, like in bicycle commuting.
- environmental benefits - most energy efficient means of transport, with the least pollution.
- health and fitness issues - 4 hours of cycling per week or approximately 10 km of cycling per day, equivalent to the average cycle trip to and from work, is an adequate level of exercise.
- economic and social impacts - cycling provides transport to segments of the population who would not otherwise be able to travel independently for reasons of age (student transport), poverty, insufficient public transport infrastructure, etc.

=== Negative marketing of utility cycling ===
Various interests may wish to create a negative image of utility cycling on public roads for a variety of reasons. Some governments, wishing to promote private car use, have organized and funded publicity designed to discourage road cycling. Official road safety organisations have been accused of distributing literature that emphasizes the danger of cycling on roads while failing to address attitudinal issues among the drivers of motor vehicles who are the main source of road danger. Some road safety authorities have been accused of having a deliberate policy of discouraging cycling as a means of reducing bicyclist casualty statistics. In 2003, Shanghai police officials released statements blaming cyclists for "gridlock" in the city and promoting plans to ban cyclists from the city streets. Starting in the 1970s, the authorities in the city of Jakarta declared "war" on the "becak" or Indonesian cycle rickshaw blaming them for traffic congestion among other things.

As with other sellers of consumer goods, the car industry's marketing efforts frequently try to associate the use of their product with a perception of increased social status. Observers in some car-focused cultures have noted a tendency to perceive or portray people who use bicycles as members of a social "out-group" with attributed negative connotations. In such cultures, such attitudes are displayed in attacks on cyclists in the media. Common themes include blanket descriptions of cyclists as a group who do not pay taxes, who break the law and who have no, or reduced, "right" to use public roads.

Negative aspects are:

- lack of or inadequacy of road and parking infrastructures - roads are typically built for cars and bicycle paths are often in worse condition than roads. Cycling infrastructure and bicycle-friendliness is generally neglected in favor of a car-centric infrastructure.
- cyclists' safety and security - the common space for cars and bicycles on the road is not complemented by the same rights and significantly higher risk of accidents for cyclists.
- weather conditions - rain and snow impact the unsheltered cyclist more than car drivers.
- poor intermodality - because of lack of transport facilities for the bicycles themselves (in trains, buses, etc.) for longer distances.

=== Retail policy ===
If significant use of bicycles for shopping trips is to be achieved, sufficient retail services must be maintained within reasonable cycling distances of residential areas. In countries like Denmark, the Netherlands and Germany the high levels of utility cycling also includes shopping trips e.g. 9% of all shopping trips in Germany are by bicycle. It is arguable that this is related to policies that favour access to retail services by non-motorised modes. The Danish 1997 Planning Act requires that planning shall encourage a diverse mix of retail shops in small and medium-sized towns and in individual districts of large cities and ensure that retail trade uses will be placed in locations to which people have good access by walking, bicycling and public transport. From the mid-1970s the Netherlands has had policies in place to severely restrict the growth of large out-of-town retail developments. Germany has had federal planning regulations in place to restrict retail uses to designated areas since the 1960s. In addition, since the 1970s federal regulations have been in place specifying that developments above a certain size (1,200 m^{2}) be assessed regarding potential adverse effects. These federal regulations are further strengthened by regionally adopted regulations. This includes regulations specifying that new retail centers be limited to selling products not readily provided by shops at inner city/town center locations. In Denmark, the Netherlands, and Germany, this approach not restricted to planning guidelines and is also supported by a ban on below-cost selling. This supports smaller shops by preventing large multiples from engaging in predatory pricing practices by aggressively discounting key goods to use as so-called loss leaders.

==== Alternative retail policies ====
From the 1980s to mid-1990s the UK operated a system of laissez-faire with regard to retail policy. The "great car economy" philosophy of the Thatcher government directly favored the growth of out-of-town retail centers at the expense of established retail services in British towns and cities. The UK Town and Country Planning Association cites research by the New Economics Foundation that notes a continuing process of change in retail provision.

- General stores are closing at the rate of one per day.
- Between 1997 and 2002, specialized stores, including butchers, bakers, fishmongers, and newsagents, closed at the rate of 50 per week.
- Nearly 30,000 independent food, drink, and tobacco retailers, or over 40%, have been lost over the past decade.

It is arguable that in such a retail/planning policy environment use of bicycles ceases to be a viable option for many shoppers and access to a private motor-car or public transport becomes a necessary prerequisite for access to basic services.

== Cycle training ==
Cycle training is another measure that is advocated as a means of maintaining or increasing levels of cycle use. The training involves teaching existing or potential cyclists bike handling, various roadcraft or "cyclecraft" skills (vehicular cycling) and educating them on the safe, lawful use of the roads. Bicycle training schemes can be differentiated according to whether they are aimed at children or adults.

In the UK, the now superseded National Cycle Proficiency scheme was focused on primary schoolchildren aged 8 and above. In this, children would start by gaining an off-road certificate working up to their on-road certificate by the age of ten. Initial training and examination took place on simulated road layouts within school playgrounds. This approach has now been supplemented by the new National Standard for cycle training which is more focussed on practical on-road training. This is part of Cycling England's portfolio of practical assistance to local authorities and other bodies, aimed at achieving their aim of "More cycling, more safely, more often".

In the United States, the League of American Bicyclists Smart Cycling 101/201 courses, based on the Effective Cycling program, has modules aimed at all ages from children to adult beginners to more experienced adults. It is argued that such schemes do not just build confidence in the students but also make it more likely that parents will let their children cycle to school. Cycle training may also be offered in an attempt to overcome cultural unfamiliarity with cycling or perceived cultural obstacles to bicycle use. In the Netherlands, some cycle training courses are targeted at women from immigrant communities, as a means of overcoming such obstacles to cycling by women from developing countries.

== User associations ==
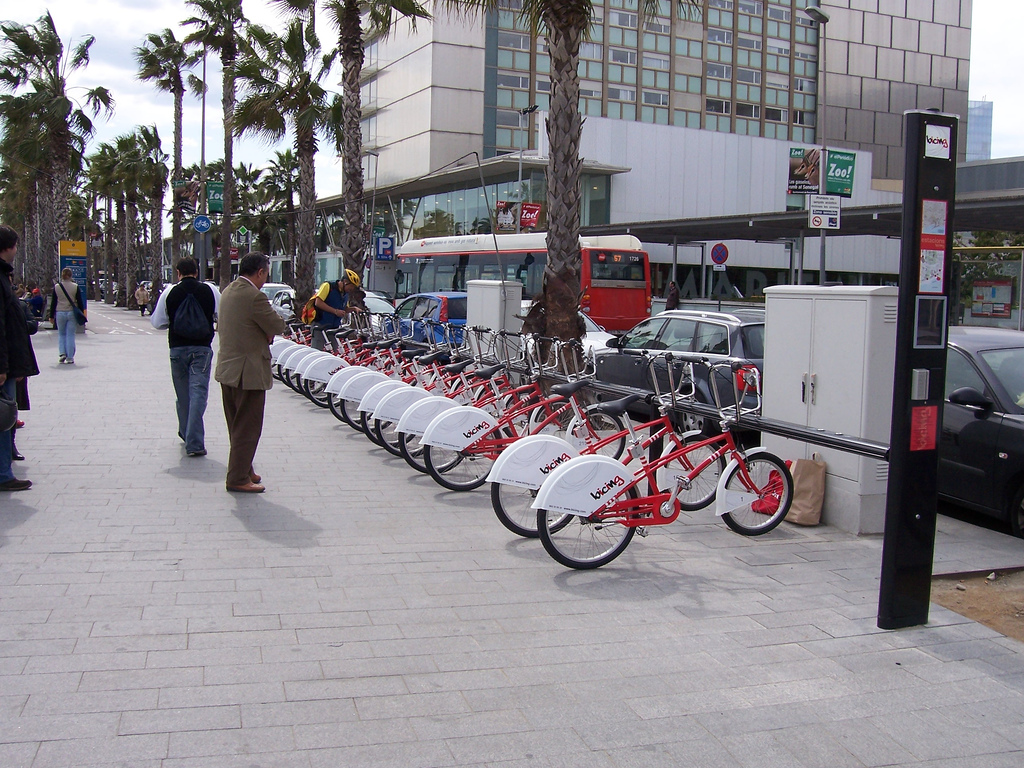
Bicing station in Barcelona

As with other walks of life, utility cyclists may form associations in order to promote and develop cycling as an everyday form of transport. The European Cyclists' Federation is the umbrella body for such groups in Europe. These associations may lobby various institutions to encourage political support or to oppose measures that they judge counter-productive, such as to oppose the introduction of compulsory bicycle helmet legislation.

== Free bicycle/short term hire schemes ==
Local bike-sharing schemes, a business which blossomed at the turn of the 21st century, are more oriented to utility cycling than other bike rentals.

== Influence of technology ==
Modern bicycle technology supports the shift towards utility cycling:

- easy-running thick tires or damped springs allow cycling over curbs
- dynamo, brakes, and gears improved and increased the riding safety, allowing usage also for elderly
- electric support was further developed in motorized bicycle or electric power-assist system and eases the take up for untrained

== See also ==
- 15 minute city – Urban accessibility concept
- Active mobility – Unmotorised transport powered by activity
- Bicycle carrier – Device attached to an automobile or bus for transporting bicycles
- Bicycle culture – Culture supporting the use of bicycles
- Bicycle trailer – Cargo accessory for bicycles
- Bicycle transportation planning and engineering
- Bicycle-friendly – Urban planning prioritising cycling
- Boda-boda – Type of motorcycle or bicycle with a space for a passenger or for carrying goods
- Car dependency – Concept that city layouts favor automobiles over other modes of transportation
- City bicycle – Bicycle for practical use (commuting, transport)
- Critical Mass – Group cycling advocating cycling friendly policy
- Cyclability – Degree of ease of cycling
- Cycling ecosystem – Set of physical, social and cultural elements that favor the use of bicycles
- Cycling network – Interconnected network of cycle routes
- Cycle racing – Competitive physical activity using bicycles
- Cycle touring – Holidays with bicycles
- Cycling advocacy – Activities promoting cycling
- Cycling infrastructure – Facilities for use by cyclists
- Cyclologistics – Freight transport by bicycles
- Fuel efficiency – Form of thermal efficiency
- Human-powered transport – Transport of goods and/or people only using human muscles
- Outline of cycling – Overview and topical guide
- Police bicycle – Bicycle used by police
- Quadracycle – Four-wheeled vehicle with pedals
- Right to mobility – Right to move in a safe, accessible, equitable and sustainable manner
- Shared space – Roads unsegregated by travel mode
- Tricycle – Three-wheeled self-powered vehicle
- Urban vitality – Intensity of use of an urban area
- Vehicular cycling – Practice of riding bicycles on roads while obeying roadway rules
- Walkability – How accessible a space is to walking
- E-bike – Motorized bicycle with an integrated electric motor

== Bibliography ==
- Paul Niquette, A Certain Bicyclist: An Offbeat Guide to the Post-Petroleum Age – Editor: Seven Palms Press (1985) – ISBN 0-912593-04-0
- Robert Hurst, The Art of Urban Cycling: Lessons from the Street – Editor: Falcon; 1st edition (1 July 2004) – ISBN 0-7627-2783-7, ISBN 978-0-7627-2783-4.
- Rhoads, Edward J. M. (2012). "Cycles of Cathay: A History of the Bicycle in China". Transfers. 2 (2): 95–120. doi:10.3167/trans.2012.020207.
- Thomason, Erin (2021). "China's New Kingdom of Bikes: Bicycling and the quest for modernity". Journal of Consumer Culture. 21 (3): 450–467. doi:10.1177/1469540518806948.
