= Bicycle messenger =

People who work for courier companies carrying and delivering items by bicycle

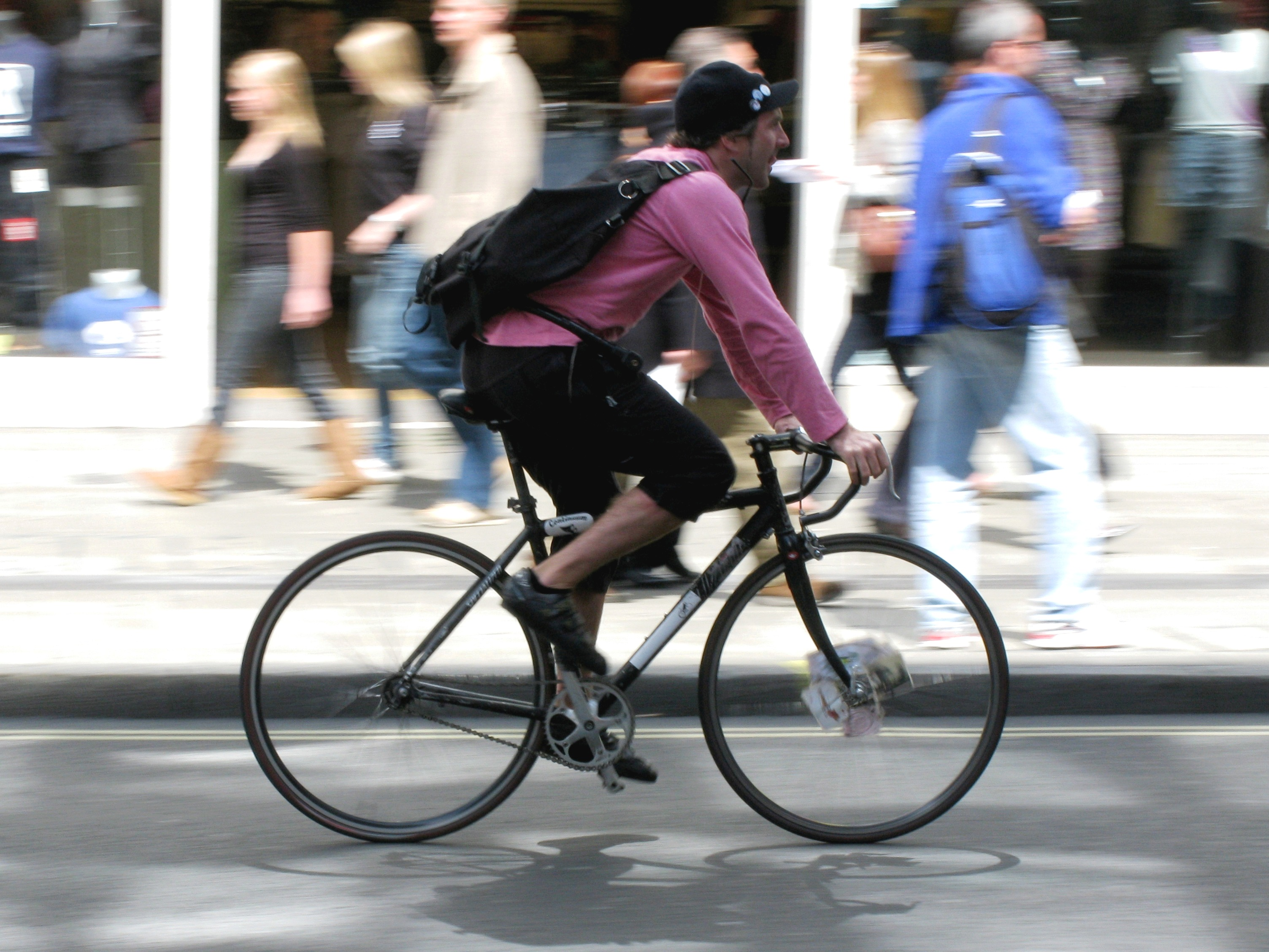
A bicycle courier in London riding a fixed-gear bicycle with spoke cards

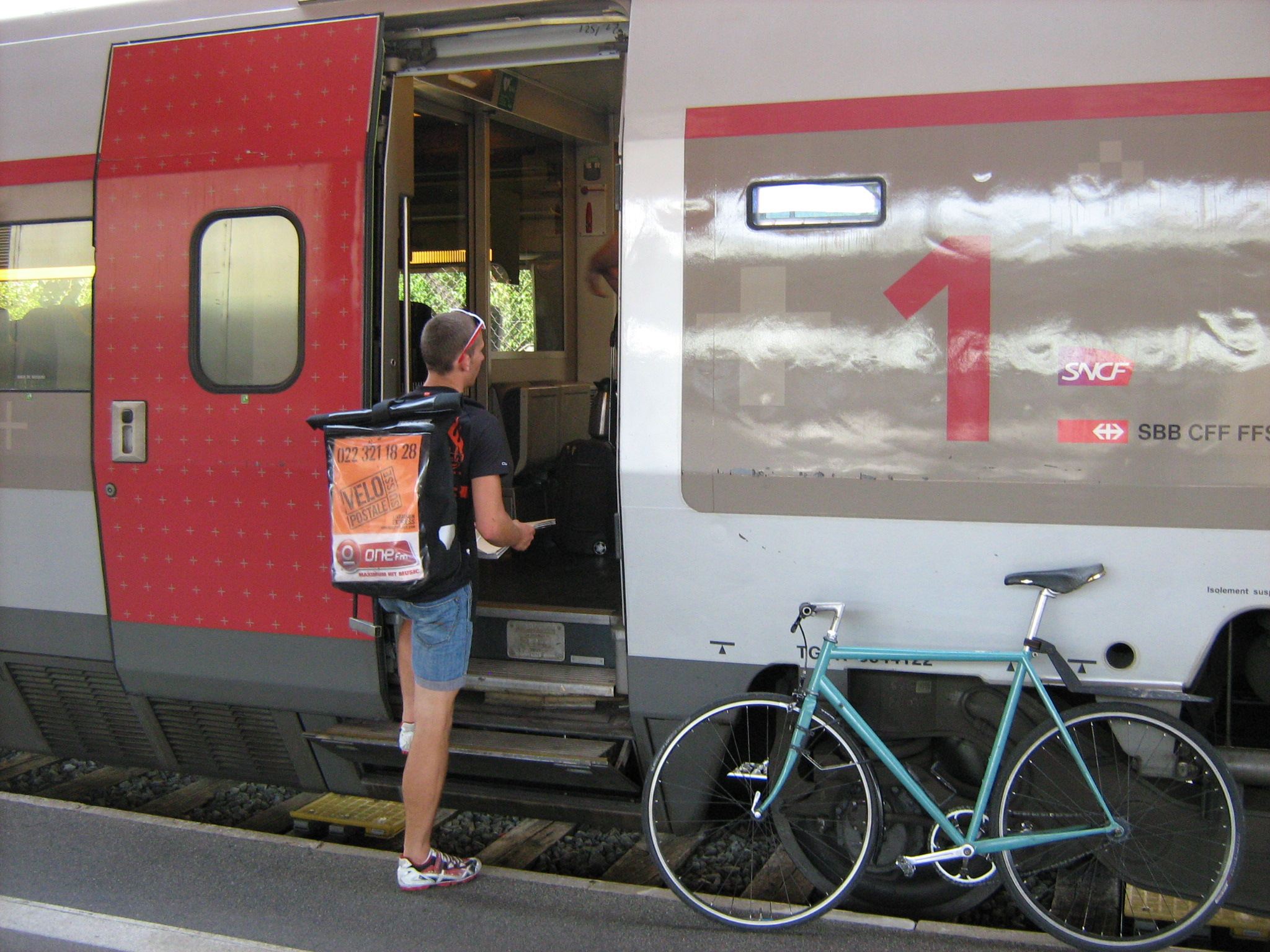
A bicycle courier transferring urgent mail onto a high-speed train in Geneva, Switzerland

Bicycle messengers (also known as bike or cycle couriers) are people who work for courier companies (also known as messenger companies) carrying and delivering items by bicycle. Bicycle messengers are most often found in the central business districts of metropolitan areas. Courier companies use bike messengers because bicycle travel is less subject to unexpected holdups in city traffic jams, and is not deterred by parking limitations, fees or fines in high-density development that can hinder or prevent delivery by motor vehicle, thereby offering a predictable delivery time.

Because bicycle thefts are prevalent in many cities, a lock, particularly a U-lock, is often used to secure the bike during deliveries. Messengers typically carry basic tools, weather-proof clothing and a street map. It is also common for messengers to carry storage clipboards for manifests, receipts, and/or other logistic documents.

== History ==
Bicycle messenger boys, Salt Lake City, 1912

Almost immediately after the development of the pedal-driven velocipede in the 1860s, people began to use the bicycle for delivery purposes. Early bicycle messengers included couriers employed by the Paris stock exchange in the 1870s. During the bicycle boom of the 1890s in the United States, Western Union and American District Telegraph Company employed a number of bicycle telegraph boys in Omaha, Nebraska, New York City, San Francisco, and other large population centers.

One of the earliest recorded post-war American bicycle courier companies was founded by Carl Sparks, in San Francisco, in 1945. According to the San Francisco Bicycle Messenger Association, "Sparkie's went on to become Aero, which was bought out in 1998 [and] later absorbed into CitySprint." By the late 1970s, there were well-established companies offering bicycle messenger services in many major cities in the U.S.

In Europe, the bicycle had fallen out of favour as a means of delivery in the third quarter of the 20th century. It was not until 1983 that bicycle messengers made their reappearance in Europe. London's "On Yer Bike" and "Pedal-Pushers" were pioneers of pedal over petrol, and the rest of the city's courier companies followed suit. By the late 1980s, cycle couriers were a common sight in central London and a British manufacturer named a range of mountain-bikes for them, the Muddy Fox 'Courier'. Entrepreneurs in continental Europe, some inspired by seeing couriers in the U.S. or in London, began to offer bicycle courier services in the late 1980s, and by 1993 there were sufficiently large numbers of bicycle couriers in Northern Europe and North America that over 400 attended the inaugural Cycle Messenger Championships in Berlin, Germany. Bicycle messengers have not become common in southern Europe, the heartland of world competitive cycling. There are very few bicycle couriers in Portugal, France, Spain, or Italy. Outside Europe and North America, there are now large bicycle messenger services in Japan, and also in New Zealand and Australia. More recently, several companies started offering bike messenger services in Central and South America, specifically in México City, México; San José, Costa Rica; Bogotá, Colombia; Buenos Aires, Argentina; Santiago, Chile; Rio de Janeiro and São Paulo, Brazil.

== Demand for courier services ==
Messengers carry a huge variety of items, from things that could not be sent by digital means (corporate gifts, original artwork, clothes for photoshoots, original signed documents) to mundane items that could easily be emailed, albeit without the air of importance attached to an express courier delivery. Messengers deliver digital content on optical media or hard disks because, despite high speed broadband connections, companies find it easier to send a disc than to work out how to transmit larger amounts of data than an email account can handle. Legal documents, various financial instruments and sensitive information are routinely sent by courier, reflecting a distrust of digital cryptography.

Commentators have claimed that technological innovation will significantly reduce the demand for same-day parcel delivery, predicting that the fax machine, and then the internet, would render the messenger business obsolete. There is still a demand for fast courier services, but there is certainly some truth in the predictions. Reliable data specifically relating to bicycle messenger occupational statistics is hard to find: the U.S. Department of Labor statistics does not track bicycle messengers specifically, and does not include "independent contractors" in statistics referenced for this industry occupation, but reports indicate the business is shrinking.

The gradual acceptance of electronic filing by U.S. courts has had a negative effect on the market. In San Francisco, bike messengers report a smaller work force coupled with decreased earnings. In New York City alone, the number of messengers dropped by approximately 1,000 between 1998 and 2008.

== Food delivery ==
Food delivery apps, such as DoorDash, Postmates, Grubhub and Uber Eats, have transformed food delivery in recent years. Food delivery with an app has led to new forms of exploitation for food deliverers.

As of 2021, there were about 70,000 food delivery workers in New York City.

The purpose of food delivery apps is to get customers their food as fast as possible; this can lead to exploitation of workers. Additionally, delivery staff face dangers such as injuries in traffic, dooring, bicycle theft, and muggings.

== Working conditions ==
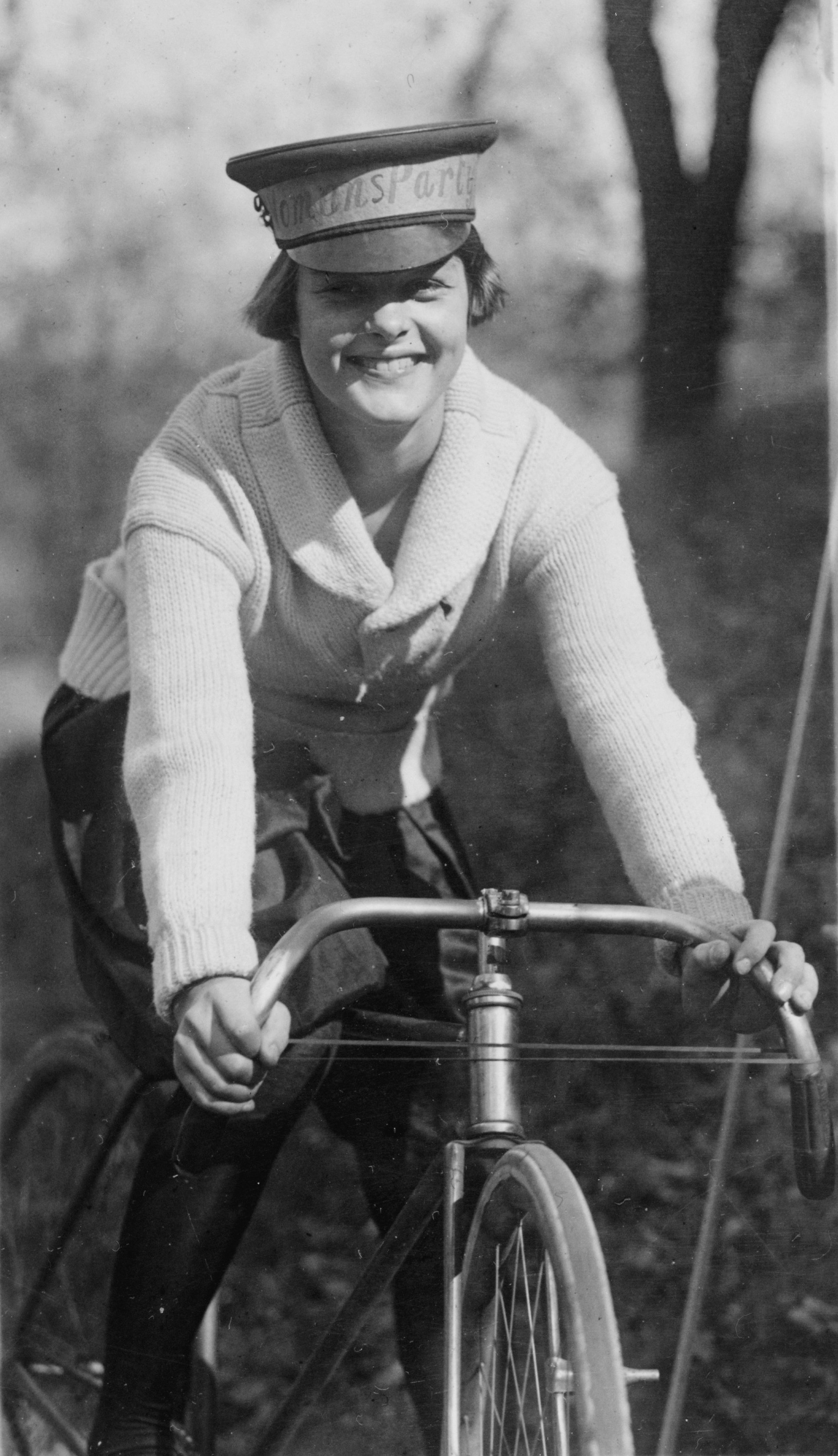
Julia Obear at the headquarters of the National Woman's Party, 1922

The conditions of employment of bicycle messengers vary from country to country, city to city, and even company to company. Contracts governing the relationship between individual courier and company are subject as much to customary practice, as a local ordinance. In some places messengers are independent contractors paid on commission and do not receive benefits such as health insurance. In other places, they will be regular employees of the courier company enjoying all the benefits thereof.

The employment status of the bicycle messengers of one of the UK's biggest same-day courier services, CitySprint, was challenged by the GMB trade union in December 2007. The challenge arose after the firm terminated the contract of one of its riders. The GMB sought to establish that more than 1,500 CitySprint operatives currently classified as self-employed sub-contractors should be re-classified as employees.

The job is poorly paid relative to the risk and effort required. In 2002, a Harvard Medical School study of injury rates among Boston bicycle messengers determined that the rate of injury requiring time off work among the sample group was more than thirteen times the U.S. average, and more than three times higher than the next highest group, workers in the meat-packing industry. Bike messengers have been killed while working in the United States. Eight bicycle messengers are known to have been killed while working in London between 1989 and 2003. Because payment is made at piece rates, it is hard to get reliable figures for messenger income. A study published in 2006 stated that the average daily wage of London bicycle messengers was £65 a day, and that of bicycle messenger in Cardiff was £45. The UK legal minimum wage at that time was £5.52 an hour.

== Licensing ==
In most cities, there are no legal requirements beyond those applying to all cyclists. Some jurisdictions, though, require the licensing of courier bicycles. In Calgary, Alberta for example, metal license plates must be fixed to bicycles used for courier work. Vancouver, British Columbia additionally requires bicycle messengers to complete a test in order to obtain a license, and to carry an identification card. In the United States, the state of Massachusetts requires that bicycle messengers in Boston are licensed and display an assigned license number on a city-issued plate.

== Equipment ==
The most essential piece of equipment for a bicycle messenger is a bicycle. Some large cities that employ significant numbers of bike messengers (e.g., New York City) have relatively flat terrain, and are especially conducive to the performance properties of fixed-gear bicycles.

The majority of messengers use a bag to carry deliveries and personal effects. Bags with a single strap that wraps diagonally across the chest (popularly known as messenger bag) are popular because they can be swung around the messenger's body to allow access without removing the bag. Clasps which can be adjusted with one hand (ideal for riding), clips, pockets, and webbing loops on the strap for holding a cell phone or two-way radio and other equipment also feature on purpose-built messenger bags. Bags generally have large capacities (up to 50 liters or 3,000 cubic inches). Baskets and racks mounted on the bike are also used, and at least one messenger service (in New York City) equips its riders with specialized three-wheel cycles (sometimes known as cargo-trikes), with a large trunk in the rear. Besides cargo-trikes, many messengers choose to ride various forms of cargo bikes for delivering large objects or high volumes of deliveries. Some bicycle messengers also wear helmets and dismount lights and fenders (mudguards) from stock bicycles.

== Communications ==
Messengers communicate and are dispatched to assignments via hand-held communication devices including two-way radios, cell phones, and personal digital assistants. Many of the larger messenger services equip their riders with GPS tracking devices, for ease of location. Usage of digital platforms is now common practice.

== Messenger culture and influence ==
=== Media ===
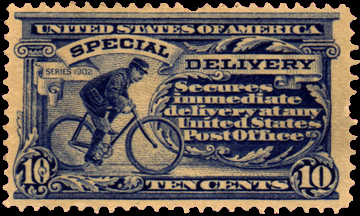
1902 US postal stamp depicting a bicycle messenger

Messengers have been used in fiction media as symbols of urban living, and have been the subject of novels, memoirs, feature films, television series, comic books, and sociological studies. Mexican artist José Guadalupe Posada created a popular icon of a marijuana-smoking bicycle courier everyman in his 19th-century engravings.

The 1986 film Quicksilver featuring a bicycle messenger, is an early expression of the mythology of the messenger as a daredevil stunt rider. Star Kevin Bacon rides a racing bike, a fixed gear bike and a trick bike with 1:1 gear ratio and zero-rake forks, to perform the stunts in the film. The 2000–2002 television series Dark Angel had the main character Max Guevara, played by Jessica Alba, as a bicycle messenger at a courier service named Jam Pony. The show took place in a post-apocalyptic Seattle where motorized transportation was costly and therefore couriers were more prevalent and bicycle messengers were seen as a prominent position. The 2012 film Premium Rush, starring Joseph Gordon-Levitt, is also set in the world of bike messengers. In the TV show Suits, Patrick J. Adams often has flashback scenes to his previous job as a bike messenger. The main character of the game inFAMOUS is also a bike messenger who possesses amazing skills in parkour and urban exploration.

News media have made portrayals of messengers ranging from innocuous urban libertines to reckless, cliquish nihilists. The latter portrayal is often sparked by local incidents involving bike messengers in collisions with other road-users or run-ins with authority figures. These incidents also occasionally lead to proposals for, and dispute over, new ordinances and regulations on messengers and messengering.

=== Fashion ===
The influence of bicycle messengers can be seen in urban fashion, most notably the popularity of single-strap messenger bags, which are a common accessory among people who do not ride a bicycle regularly. The rise in popularity of fixed-gear bicycles in the mid-2000s, complete with affectations such as spoke cards (gathered from "alleycats" typically), is attributed to bicycle messengers. Casquettes, or cycling caps, are available in many designs and patterns, and are worn when not cycling or by non-cyclists as fashion items.

=== Events ===
Since 1993, Cycle Messenger World Championships, CMWCs, have taken place at national, continental and world levels. These events are held as much for fun and messenger networking as for competition. Bicycle messengers also take part in formal cycle competitions at all levels, and in all disciplines. Nelson Vails, silver medalist on the velodrome in the 1984 Olympics, worked as a bicycle messenger in New York City in the early 1980s. Ivonne Kraft, who competed in the 2004 Olympic cross country mountain bike race, is a multiple former Cycle Messenger World Champion, and worked as a bicycle messenger in Germany for a number of years.

== See also ==
- Cycle Messenger World Championships
- Alleycat races
- Bicycle culture
- Courier
- Telegraph boy
- Double Rush (sitcom)
- Cargo bike
- Outline of cycling
- Package delivery
- Paperboy or papergirl
- Premium Rush (movie)
- Triple Rush (reality TV)
- ebike
