= Single national file of identified cycles =

French national register of identified bicycles

Fichier national unique des cycles identifiés
Agency overview
- Formed: 1 January 2021
- Jurisdiction: France
- Agency executive: Association de promotion et d'identification des cycles et de la mobilité active (APIC), Managing body
- Parent agency: Ministry responsible for transport
- Website: apic-asso.com

The Fichier national unique des cycles identifiés (FNUCI; "single national file of identified cycles") is a French government database, created in 2021, that records unique identifiers for bicycles together with their owners' contact details. Its purpose is to combat bicycle theft and the handling of stolen bicycles, and to make it easier to return recovered bicycles to their owners. It is managed on behalf of the state by the Association de promotion et d'identification des cycles et de la mobilité active (APIC).

The FNUCI generalises and makes mandatory the principle of the Bicycode marking scheme, created in 2004 by the Fédération française des usagers de la bicyclette (FUB), whose database was incorporated into the FNUCI. By the end of October 2024, more than 6.5 million bicycles were registered, over a third of the bicycles in use in France.

== History ==
=== Creation ===
The Loi d'orientation des mobilités (LOM, Mobility Orientation Act) of 24 December 2019 (Note: "Article 53 de la loi n° 2019-1428 du 24 décembre 2019 d'orientation des mobilités". Légifrance (in French). JORF no. 299, 26 December 2019, text no. 1, NOR TRET1821032L, creating articles L1271-2 to L1271-5 of the Transport Code.) and its implementing decree of 23 November 2020, (Note: "Décret n° 2020-1439 du 23 novembre 2020 relatif à l'identification des cycles". Légifrance (in French). JORF no. 285, 25 November 2020, text no. 40, NOR TRAT2007448D, creating articles R1271-1 to R1271-26 of the Transport Code.) issued after an opinion of the CNIL dated 15 October 2020, made marking mandatory for new bicycles sold by retailers from 1 January 2021, and for second-hand bicycles sold by professionals from 1 July 2021. Sales between private individuals are not covered. Children's bicycles are exempt, the obligation applying only to bicycles larger than 16 inches. Owners of bicycles bought before these dates, or bought from a private seller, may have them marked voluntarily.

The APIC, set up on the initiative of the FUB and the trade body Union Sport & Cycle, was registered with the Prefecture of Police in Paris on 26 August 2020. On 28 December 2020 it was designated as manager of the file, (Note: "Arrêté du 28 décembre 2020 relatif à la gestion du fichier national unique des cycles identifiés". Légifrance (in French). JORF no. 315, 30 December 2020, text no. 91, NOR TRAT2033442A.) and the practical arrangements were set out the following day. (Note: "Arrêté du 29 décembre 2020 relatif à l'identification des cycles". Légifrance (in French). JORF no. 316, 31 December 2020, text no. 26, NOR TRET2031915A.) Its members include cyclists' associations, representatives of the cycle trade and the approved identification operators.

From 2021, cycle identification operators have been approved by the minister responsible for transport, after consulting the Minister of the Interior and the file manager. Approvals are reported to last one year, tacitly renewable for up to six years.

=== Rollout to law enforcement ===
The file is accessible to the National Police, the National Gendarmerie and municipal police, who can look up an owner's contact details from the identifier of a recovered bicycle. In July 2022, the National Police publicly launched its use of the file. Monthly consultations by law enforcement rose from about 500 in 2022 to 1,042 in 2023 and more than 1,300 in 2024. A poster campaign, Mon vélo, j'y tiens ("I care about my bike"), was run in police stations and gendarmerie posts.

=== 2025 amendment ===
An order (arrêté) dated 9 January 2025 and published in the Journal officiel on 21 March 2025 amended the order of 29 December 2020. Since 22 March 2025, the status "out of use, destroyed" has been replaced by "out of use, recycling or reuse", so that bicycles handed to reuse professionals can be tracked. Approved operators must now comply with specifications drawn up by the APIC, in particular on how and where the identifier is fitted, and must send the minister responsible for transport an annual APIC opinion on their technical process and on how they transmit data.

== Operation ==
The identifier, ten characters long, is issued by the file manager, supplied by an approved operator and fixed permanently to the frame, by engraving, a label or a secure sticker. At the point of sale, the retailer records the bicycle's details (type, make, model, colour) and the owner's contact details in the operator's database, which passes them on to the FNUCI. Each operator is the data controller for its own database; the right to object does not apply to it, while rights of access and rectification are exercised with the operator. Marking costs roughly €10 to €30 depending on the method.

The file records events in a bicycle's life such as sale, resale, theft, return and destruction. Anyone can check a bicycle's status online from its identifier, for example before buying second-hand from a private seller, but only law enforcement can see the owner's contact details. When selling, the seller declares the change of ownership to the operator.

== Results ==
According to the ministry responsible for transport, the file held 63,800 theft reports at the end of October 2024. The share of stolen registered bicycles that were later recovered rose from 7.5% in 2022 to 10.3% in 2023 and 11.4% in 2024. For comparison, the APIC estimates that around 300,000 bicycles are stolen each year in France, of which about 100,000 are recovered by law enforcement.

Some members of parliament have described the scheme as insufficient and proposed extending marking to all bicycles in use or systematically checking bicycles used by delivery riders. The government considers the scheme well suited to the problem, provided it becomes more widespread and better known, and points to training for municipal police officers.

== Approved identification operators ==
According to approval decisions published in the Journal officiel, the following cycle identification operators have been approved by the French state:

Operator	Brand	Method	Approved	Notes	Ref.
Bicycode	Adcolite	micro-percussion	25 February 2021	Acquired in 2024 by Ocode and Roole.	(Note: Décision du 25 février 2021, JORF no. 60, 11 March 2021, text no. 50, NOR TRAT2106119S.)
Bicycode	Adcolite	sticker	25 February 2021	Acquired in 2024 by Ocode and Roole.	(Note: Décision du 25 février 2021, JORF no. 60, 11 March 2021, text no. 50, NOR TRAT2106119S.)
Bicycode	Adcolite	chemical process, large format	23 February 2024	Acquired in 2024 by Ocode and Roole.	(Note: Décision du 23 février 2024, JORF no. 63, 15 March 2024, text no. 44, NOR TRET2400699S.)
Bicycode	Adcolite	chemical process, small format	23 February 2024	Acquired in 2024 by Ocode and Roole.	(Note: Décision du 23 février 2024, JORF no. 63, 15 March 2024, text no. 44, NOR TRET2400699S.)
Bicycode	Adcolite	sticker under lacquer	23 February 2024	Acquired in 2024 by Ocode and Roole.	(Note: Décision du 23 février 2024, JORF no. 63, 15 March 2024, text no. 44, NOR TRET2400699S.)
Euro Identification	Recobike		25 February 2021		(Note: Décision du 25 février 2021, JORF no. 58, 9 March 2021, text no. 26, NOR TRAT2106127S.)
Malinéo	Paravol	very high-resistance sticker	25 February 2021	Acquired in 2024 and merged into Bicycode.	(Note: Décision du 25 février 2021, JORF no. 58, 9 March 2021, text no. 25, NOR TRAT2106125S.)
Manufacture française du cycle (Intersport)		label	25 February 2021		(Note: Décision du 25 février 2021, JORF no. 58, 9 March 2021, text no. 24, NOR TRAT2106121S.)
Auvray	Auvray Speed Marking	micro-percussion	10 March 2021		(Note: Décision du 10 mars 2021, JORF no. 64, 16 March 2021, text no. 27, NOR TRAT2107734S.)
Auvray	ICAbike	sticker	10 March 2021		(Note: Décision du 10 mars 2021, JORF no. 64, 16 March 2021, text no. 27, NOR TRAT2107734S.)
Decathlon	Valver	sticker	7 May 2021		(Note: Décision du 7 mai 2021, JORF no. 111, 13 May 2021, text no. 62, NOR TRAT2114236S.)
Decathlon		label on lacquer with chemical bonding	1 June 2023		(Note: Décision du 1er juin 2023, JORF no. 135, 13 June 2023, text no. 8, NOR TRET2314998S.)
Decathlon		label under lacquer	25 October 2023		(Note: Décision du 25 octobre 2023, JORF no. 254, 31 October 2023, text no. 31, NOR TRET2326577S.)
Starway	SW	stamping	26 November 2021		(Note: Décision du 26 novembre 2021, JORF no. 282, 4 December 2021, text no. 73, NOR TRAT2135473S.)
Moustache Bikes		high-resistance adhesive	30 June 2023		(Note: Décision du 30 juin 2023, JORF no. 165, 19 July 2023, text no. 32, NOR TRET2320209S.)
T-SUR			5 July 2023		(Note: Décision du 5 juillet 2023, JORF no. 162, text no. 44, NOR TRET2318192A.)
Velopass BV		durable decal sticker	25 October 2023	Belgian company.	(Note: Décision du 25 octobre 2023 relative à l'agrément de la société Velopass BV comme opérateur d'identification de cycles.)
enCaps		label	20 May 2025	Montpellier-based start-up.	(Note: Décision du 20 mai 2025, JORF no. 0125, 20 May 2025, NOR ATDT2511073S.)

== See also ==
- Bicycle theft
- Bicycle registration
- Cycling in France
