= Bicycle parking rack =

Device used to park bicycles, not to be confused with a kick stand

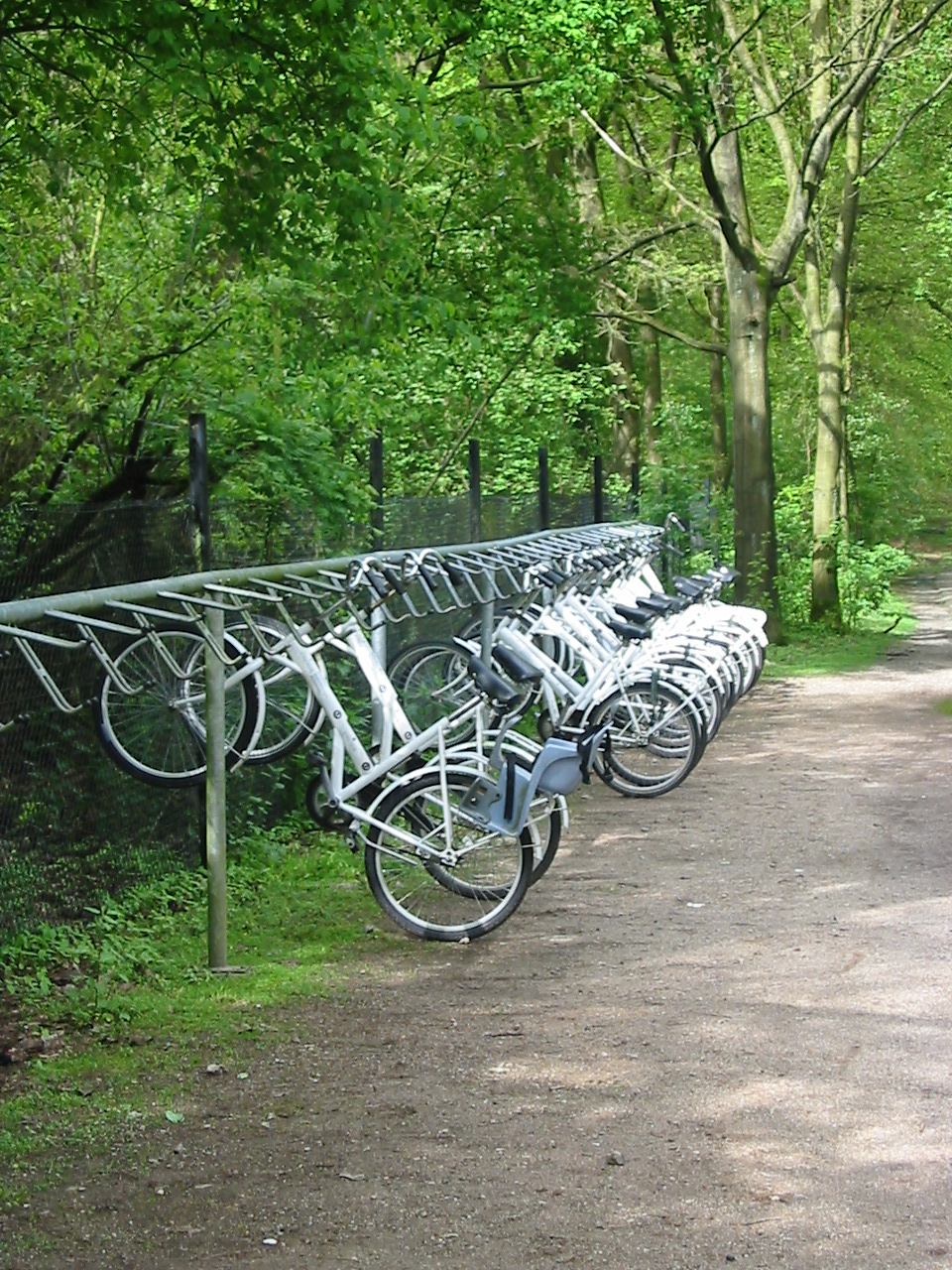
White cycles for free use in Hoge Veluwe National Park, the Netherlands

A bicycle parking rack, usually shortened to bike rack and also called a bicycle stand, is a device to which bicycles can be securely attached for parking purposes. It may be freestanding, or securely attached to the ground or a stationary object, such as a building. Indoor racks are commonly used for private bicycle parking, while outdoor racks are often used in commercial areas. General styles of racks include the Inverted U, Serpentine, Bollard, Grid, and Decorative. The most effective and secure bike racks are those that can secure both wheels and the frame of the bicycle, using a bicycle lock.

Bike racks can be constructed from a number of materials, including stainless steel, steel, recycled plastic, and thermoplastic. Durability, weather resistance, appearance and functionality are important factors when choosing this material. The visibility of the bike rack, adequate spacing from automobile parking and pedestrian traffic, weather coverage, and proximity to destinations are all important factors determining usefulness of a bicycle rack, helping to increase its usage and assure cyclists that their bikes are securely parked.

== History ==
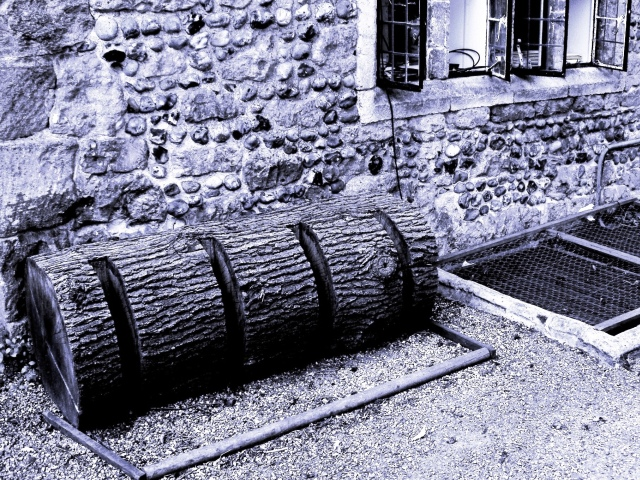
Simple grooved bicycle rack (2006)

Early models tend to offer a means of securing one wheel: these can be a grooved piece of concrete in the ground, a forked piece of metal into which a wheel of the bicycle is pushed, or a horizontal "ladder" providing positions for the front wheel of many bicycles. These are not very effective, since a thief need only detach the wheel in question from the bicycle to free the rest of the bicycle. They also do not offer much support, and a row of bicycles in this type of stand are susceptible to all being toppled in a domino effect. These types of stand are known as "wheel benders" among cyclists.

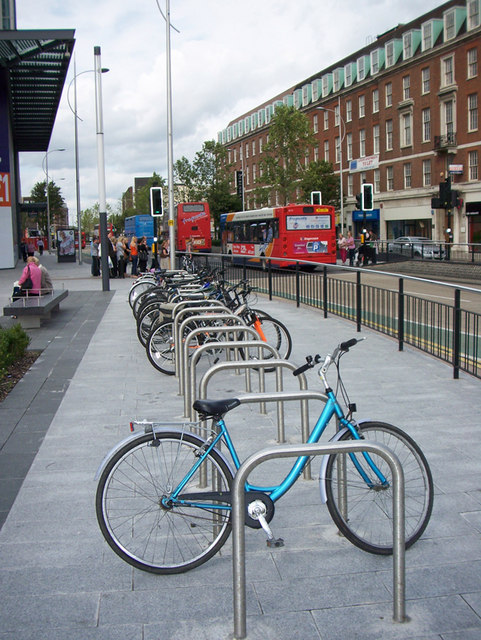
Sheffield racks

A modern version is known as the "Sheffield rack" or "Sheffield stand" after the city of Sheffield in England where these were pioneered. These consist of a thick metal bar or tube bent into the shape of a square arch. The top part is about level with the top bar of the bicycle frame, and thus supports the bicycle and allows the frame to be secured. The origin of the racks was when the frugal citizens of Sheffield had to decide what to do with some old gas piping. Local cyclists suggested the cycle rack idea and two simple bends later, and a little concrete in the ground, the rack was born. At the time this was a revolution in a world of 'single-point holders' that bent wheels and offered little lockability for frames. A version of this design feature a second, lower horizontal bar to support smaller bikes (this version is also known as "A stand"), and are coated to reduce their surface hardness and to not scratch the bike's paintwork.

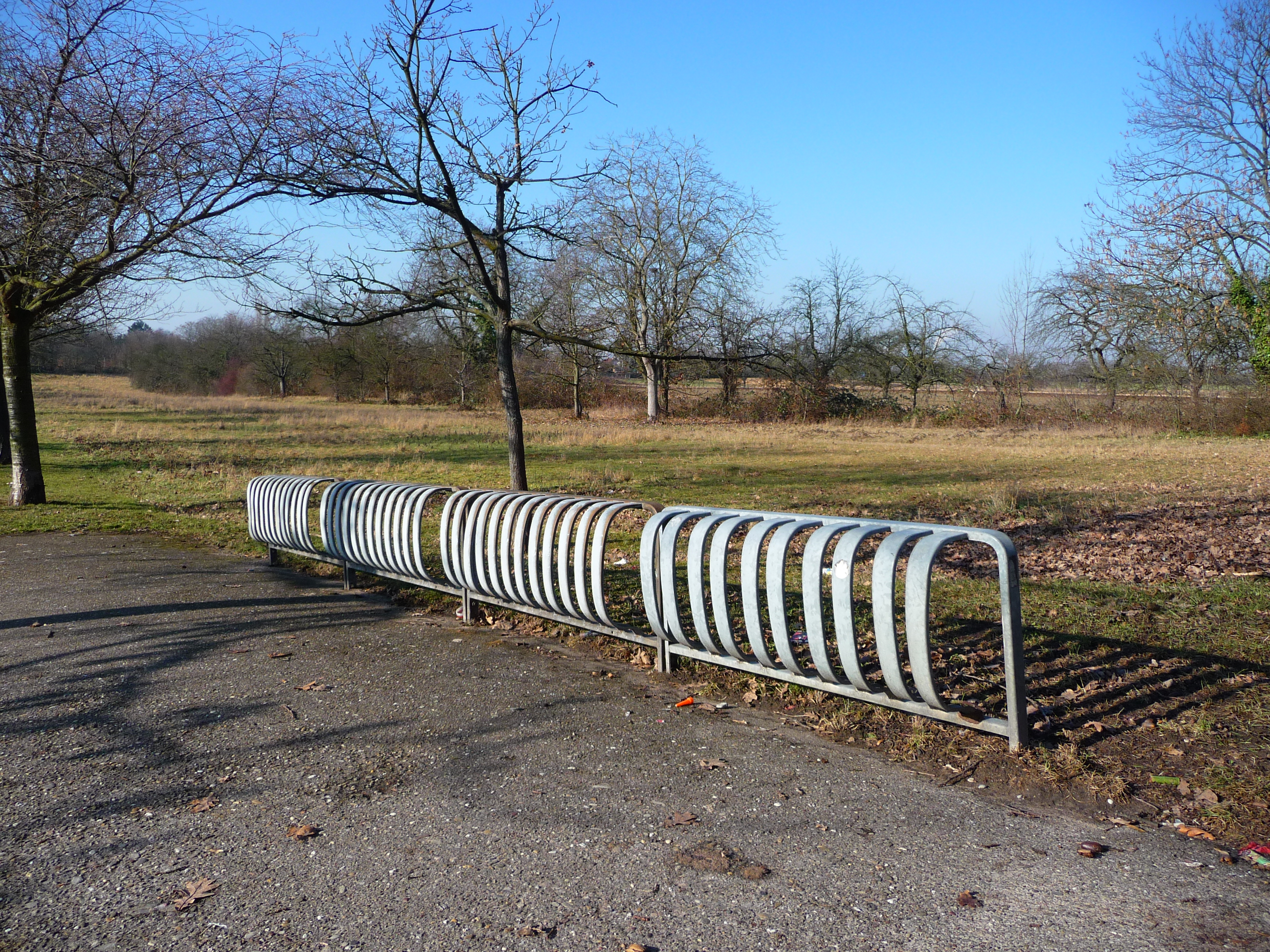
Ladder type in Germany

Since 1984 the City of Toronto has installed post and ring bicycle racks consisting of a steel bollard or post topped by a cast aluminium ring. In August 2006, it became publicly known that these stands could be defeated by prying the ring off with a two-by-four, limiting its effectiveness in high-crime areas.

In Amsterdam two-tiered bicycle stands are ubiquitous. Bikes can be parked in a smaller area as the handlebars (usually wider than the back of the bicycle) of every other one is at a different height (either high or low). These racks are made of steel and have a large bar to which the frame may be easily locked. Most Dutch bicycles have a rear wheel lock, so that wheel need not be locked.

== Classes ==
Bike parking needs vary from environment to environment.

Class I
Some locations require Class I standards (commonly referred to as long-term bike parking). Class I parking regulations are implemented when bicycles will be parked for hours at a time. Examples of these environments are office buildings, elementary schools, libraries, etc. When implementing Class I bike racks, installers should also incorporate some form of weather protection for the racks and bikes. (See also Bicycle parking station.)
Class II
More commonly seen in public areas are Class II bike racks. These bike racks are needed when cyclists will be leaving their bikes unattended for less than two hours. Weather protection is not as important for this class, however proximity to main attractions and public visibility should be considered to encourage usage and enhance security. Class II bike racks can be implemented near restaurants, parks, picnic areas, or other similar places.

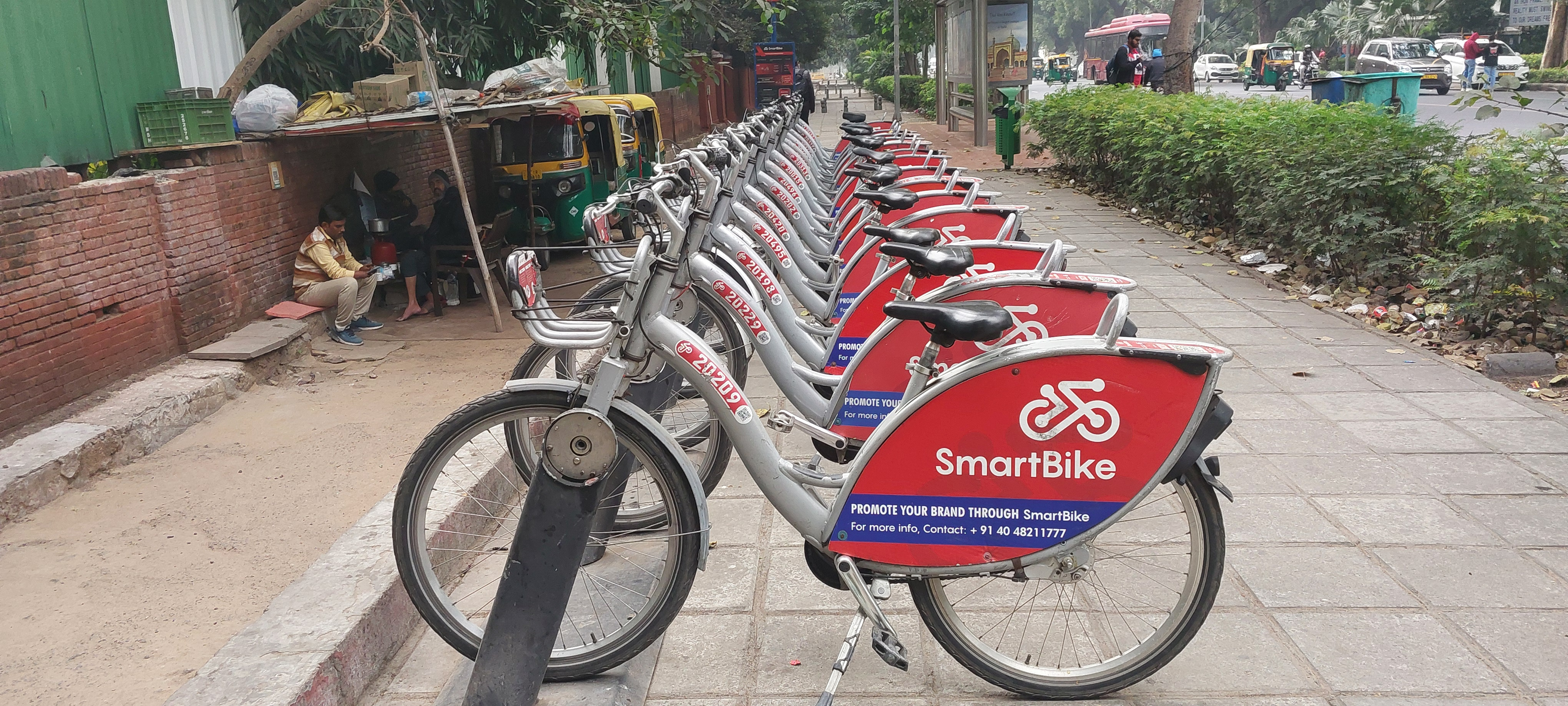
Bicycle racks in New Delhi, India

== Design ==
=== Styles ===
Many different styles of bike rack are available to match any environment. Specific details such as bolt size, tubing diameter, tubing style (square or round), height, length, and many other things vary with manufacturer, but typically, there are six general styles of commercial bike rack.

Name	Variant names	Description	Images	
U-rack	Staple, Sheffield rack	Basic bike rack that is used in urban areas because it can be placed along sidewalks without taking too much space away from pedestrians.	U-rack bolted to the ground. Unknown location.	Massed ranks of U-racks at Cambridge Leisure Park, Cambridge, England
Wave	Serpentine	The wave is an extension of the U-Rack. Waves accommodate more bicycles than the single U-rack, but only support a bicycle frame at one point (as opposed to two points with a U-rack), resulting in a greater chance of the bicycle falling over when parked in the rack.	Wave rack in New York City	Double wave rack in North Aurora, Illinois
Bollard style	Post and ring	Bollards are short vertical posts most commonly used as traffic or parking barriers. Bollard style bike racks add one or two arms to which bikes may be secured. Post-and-ring racks are a North American variant on the bollard type.	Bollard-style rack in Seattle, Washington, United States	Post-and-ring style racks in Toronto, Ontario
Grid style	Ladder	The grid consists of vertical bars that connect larger upper and lower metal tubing that accept bikes on one or both sides of the rack. Grid style racks can be left freestanding or anchored to the ground with permanent or temporary anchors. This rack does not allow both the wheel and frame of the bike to be locked, allowing for potential theft of the bicycle.	Free-standing ladder rack in front of an apothecary in Baden-Württemberg, Germany	Grid-style rack in Miedźno, Silesian Voivodeship, Poland
Innovative		Innovative designs incorporate both utility and style. Many bike rack engineers have made small alterations to basic bike racks to improve functionality and appearance.	An innovative type of bicycle rack in Davis, California	A spiral-shaped rack, functionally similar to a ladder rack, in Calgary, Alberta
Decorative		In response to the often unique nature of commercial areas, some environments require a more decorative bike rack. For example, a public aquarium or zoo may prefer a shark shaped bike rack over a traditional style bike rack.	Decorative bike rack in downtown Brooklyn, New York City	Decorative bike rack in New York City, designed by David Byrne
Double deck		Two-tier bike racks can be used to increase bicycle storage capacity in a fixed space. In order to easily maneuver a bicycle onto the top tier, some double deck bike racks incorporate hydraulic pistons to lift the bike into the rack after the user has locked it.	Double-decker bike rack at London Waterloo station, England	Double-decker bike rack at Graz Hauptbahnhof, Austria

=== Mounts ===
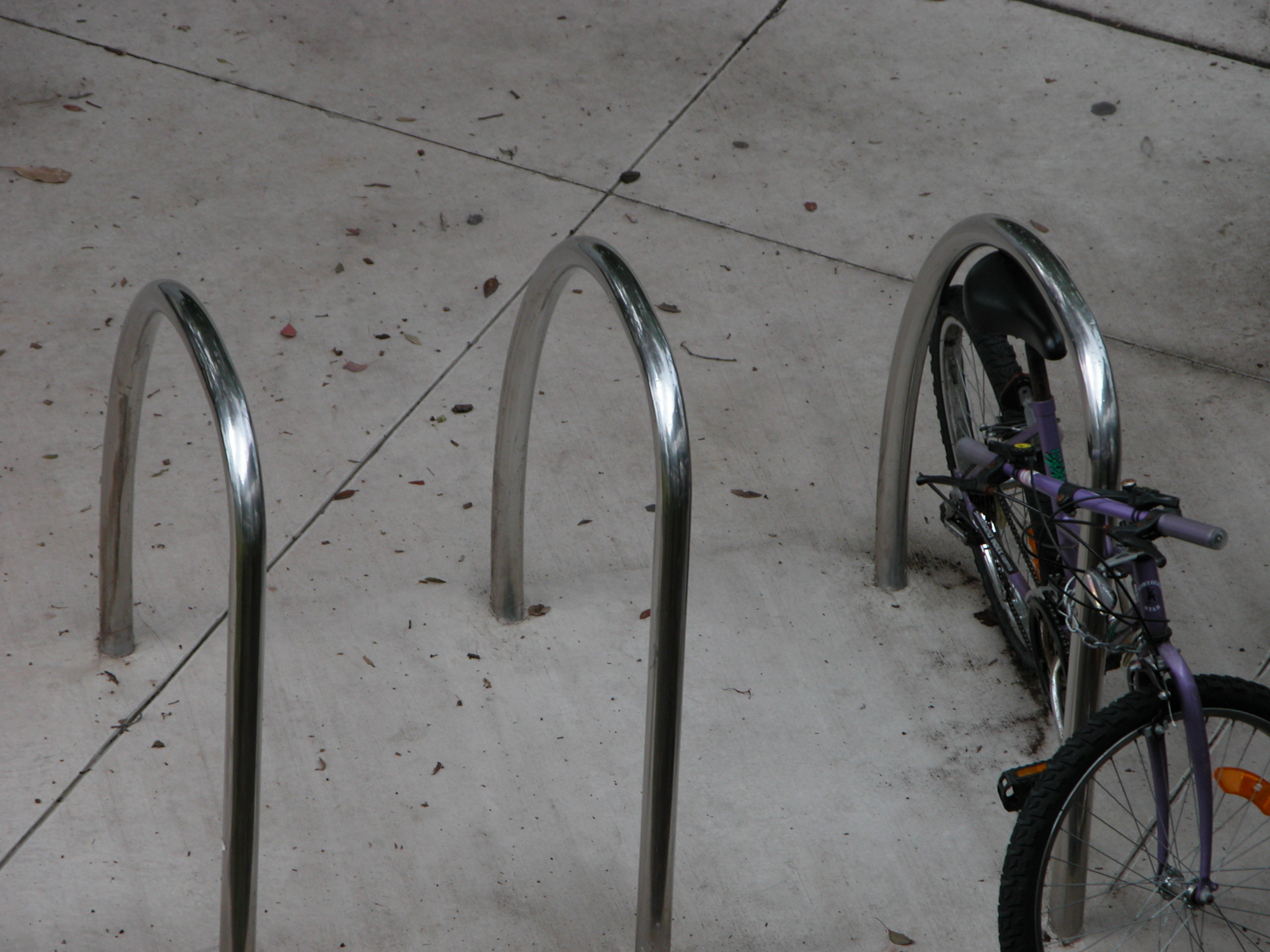
An in-ground mount

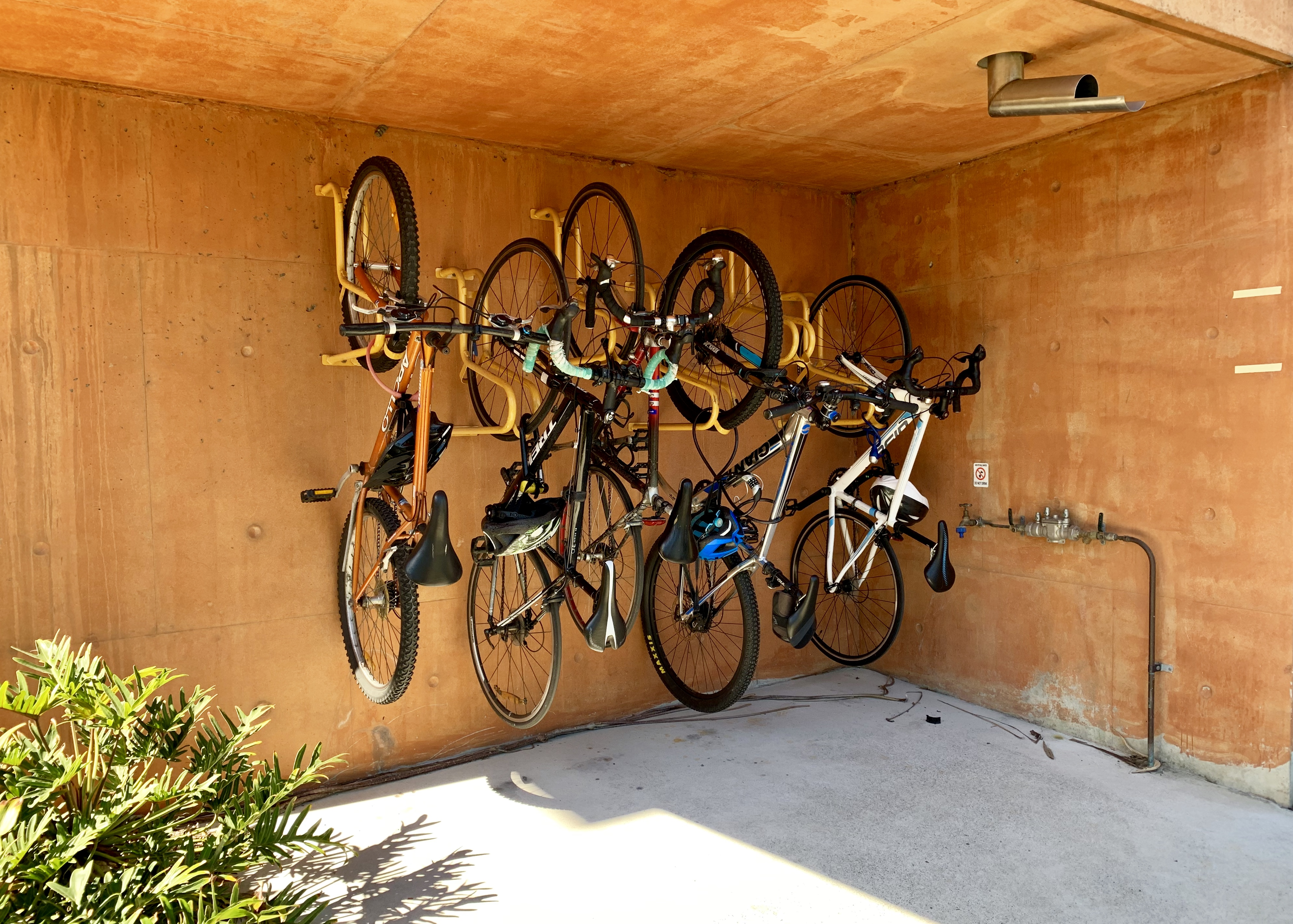
Bicycles hanging from wall mounts

Bike racks can be mounted to a surface in a number of different ways.

- In-ground: The base of the bike rack is planted into the ground, and secured by a perpendicular anchor pin for stability. These stable mounts are most secure from theft or vandalism.
- Surface: Flanges extending outwards from the base of the bike rack are secured into existing concrete with lag bolts. For added support, surface mounts can also include triangular brackets, also referred to as gusset plates, to reinforce the connection between the flange and tubing. Surface mounts with this extra support are called gusset mounts. Surface and gusset mounts are used to secure a bike rack into an existing piece of concrete.
- Rail mounts: Some bike rack units can be connected with rails. This type allows using single bike racks, while limiting the number of mounts be implemented. Rail mounts are mostly used to connect multiple 'U' Racks so each rack need not be mounted, saving labor costs and limiting the number of holes in the surface.
- Wall mounts: Certain bike racks are designed to be mounted to the wall using bolts to connect flanges of the rack onto existing walls. These conserve floor space and are most useful for long-term storage.
- Removable mounts: Some models of bike stands and bike bollards can be installed with mounting systems that allow them to become temporarily removable. Removable mountings are used in areas where removing the bike stand or bike bollard could permit temporary access to emergency, delivery and maintenance vehicles.

=== Finishes ===
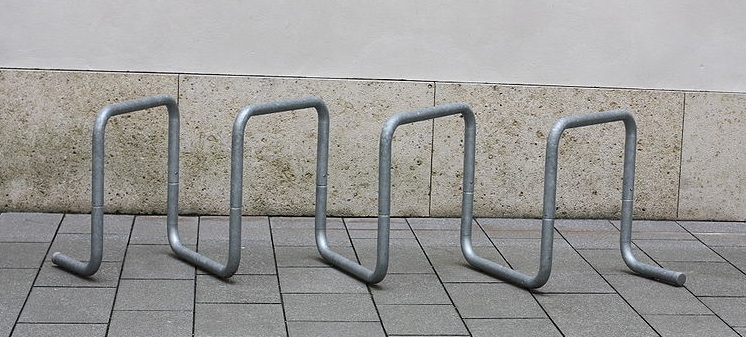
Galvanized steel bicycle rack in Vienna, Austria

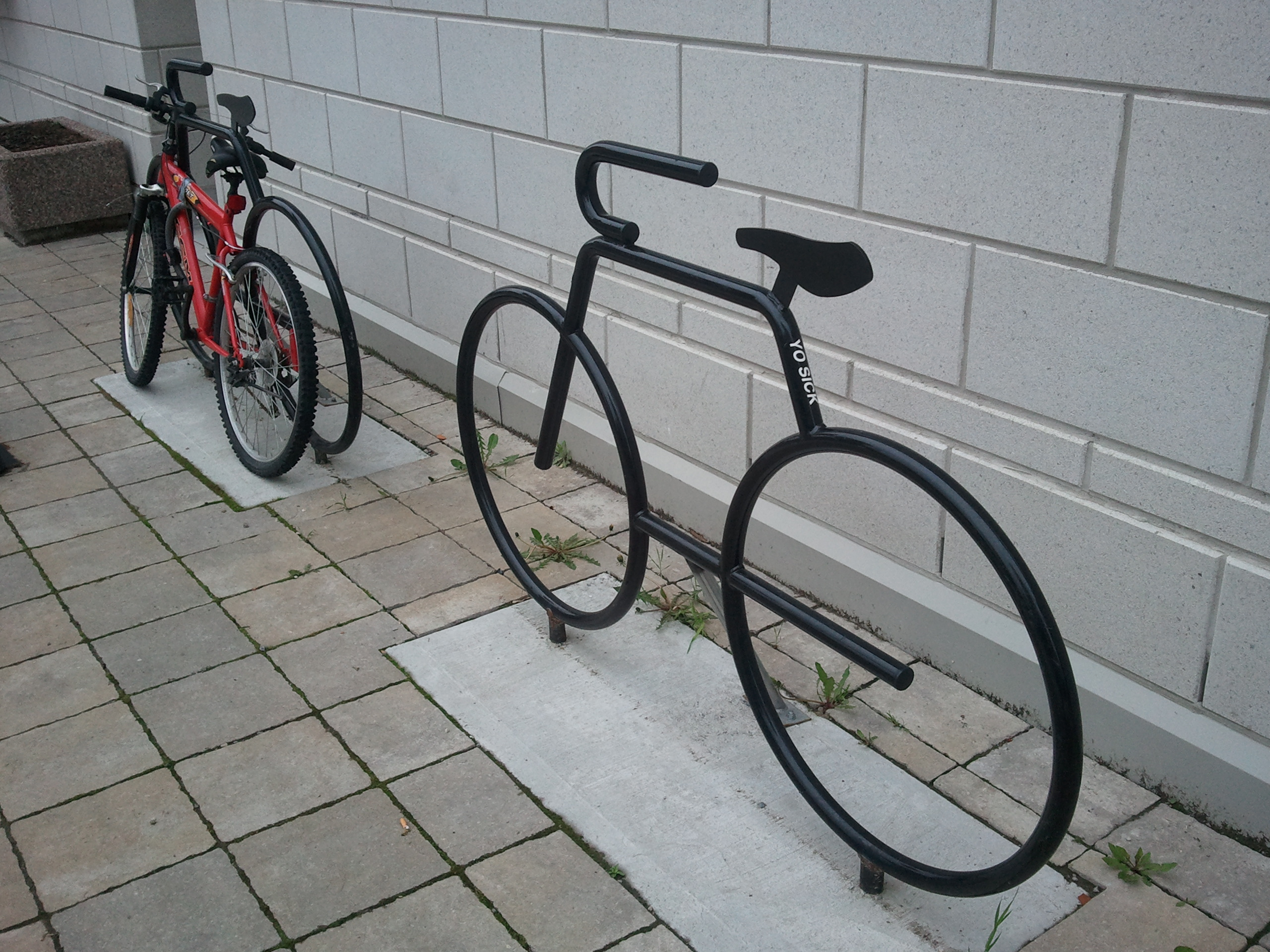
Powder-coated artistic bike rack shaped like a bicycle in Ottawa, Ontario, Canada

Commercial bike racks can be constructed with a variety of different materials. Some of the most important factors to consider when choosing a finishing material are the weather conditions the bike rack will need to endure, the overall style and look of the atmosphere, the volume of bikes the rack will be holding, and environmental issues.

- Galvanized: Galvanized bike racks are the best value finish. They are inexpensive, and provide a thin layer of zinc for corrosion protection. The appearance is a dull gray color, with little to no shine.
- Powder-coat: This finish is usually available in a wide range of colors. It is achieved by a dry-powder coat that provides a durable outer layer that has a high gloss appearance and excellent weather resistance.
- Thermoplastic-coated: This polyethylene matte finish is usually available in a wide range of colors as well. The powder coating, applied for corrosion protection, can easily match existing surroundings, and creates a finish without runs or drips.
- Recycled plastic: Recycled plastic bike racks are composed of recycled materials, up to 96% recycled. It does not splinter or crack, is more fire-safe than wood, and does not emit harmful chemicals into the environment.
- Stainless steel: Stainless steel is the most durable material for a bike rack. It has maximum corrosion protection, is antimicrobial, and has a glossy appearance that is easy to clean and maintain.
- eSteel: The eSteel process produces a durable and uniform finish. The process is environmentally friendly, and is compliant with regulations of the US OSHA and EPA agencies.

=== Area needed ===
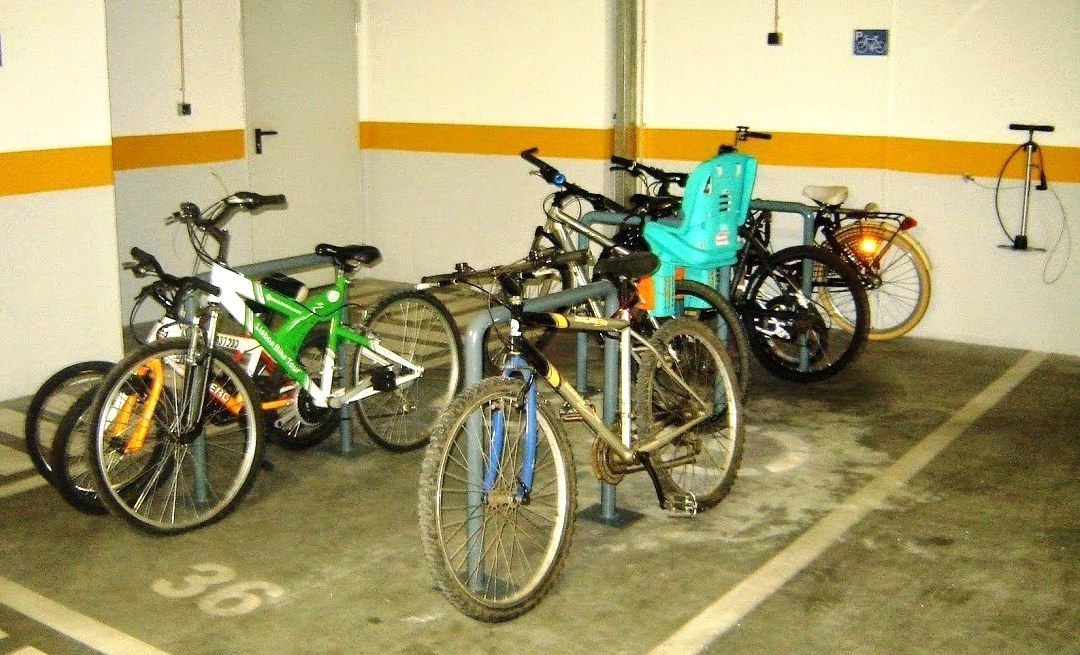
A single-car parking place replaced by a set of U-rack parking spots in a parking garage

Bicycle parking takes up much less space than parking for cars. A typical bicycle is about 1.8 meters (5 ft 11 in) long, 1 meter (3 ft 3 in) high and 40–60 cm (16–24 in) wide. Based on an ordinary bicycle, the Stavanger municipality guide suggests the following area requirements for parking racks:

- Area-efficient A racks: 17.5 m^{2} for 10 bicycles (0.5 meter width per bicycle)
- 2-story rack: 7 m^{2} for 10 bikes (0.4 meter width per bike)

The guide indicates that a depth of 3.5 meters is needed (of which 2 m is for the bicycle and rack, and 1.5 m for access). If cargo bikes or bikes with trailers are to be able to be parked, the area must be increased.

If there is very little floor space, a bicycle rack can be used where the bike is hung uphill behind the front wheels, but such racks are more cumbersome to use.

== Installation ==
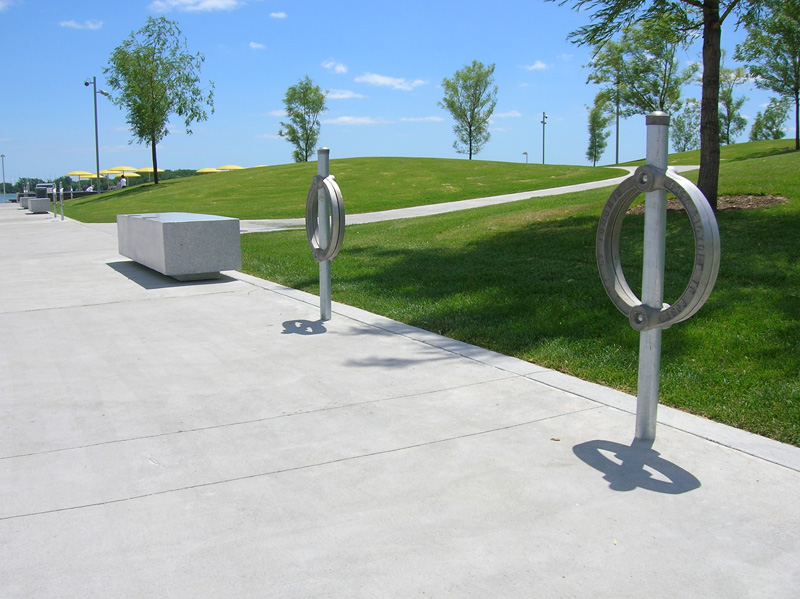
Post and ring bicycle stands in Toronto, Ontario, Canada

Where a bike rack is installed is just as important as how safe and useful it is. The better the location, the more use the bike rack will encourage. Bike racks should be installed in an area that is highly visible to the public. By avoiding isolated areas and hidden spaces, cyclists will feel safe enough to lock their bikes there. Crowded locations will also deter bike thieves from stealing bicycles. Also, by placing bike racks in a highly visible area, the location will most likely be near common places of interest, making it more convenient for people to ride their bike to their destinations.

However, while a bike rack should be implemented in a visible area, it is important that the bike rack have adequate spacing away from pedestrians and other traffic. Bike riders will need ample space to maneuver their bike around and into the rack, without hitting other parked bikes, cars, or people. It is also important to place bike racks far enough away from doorways, sidewalks, or paths where it may obstruct traffic flow.

Another important factor to consider is weather protection. If bike racks are being used for long-term parking, the bike rack should be placed under some form of weather protection. This will not only help protect the bike rack from corrosion, but also encourage bike riders to store their bikes there for extended periods of time.

Although the primary use for a bicycle stand is for parking, it is useful at times to use it for maintenance and adjustments. While it is difficult to spin a rear wheel while making derailleur adjustments, if a stand were high enough to support the rear of the bike by the saddle nose, then this problem could be solved. Generally speaking, stands are not high enough for this and quite often have bracings and other obstructions in their construction that would prevent such use.

Along with bike racks, often other cycle infrastructure is added to a cycle parking project. This can include bike pumps and repair stations to allow on-the-go maintenance of bicycles, and wash stations for cleaning. Some modern, large scale projects use technology such as bicycle detection systems to show users whether there is space available for their cycle, and e-bike charging stations to allow electric bike users to plug in while away from home.

== See also ==
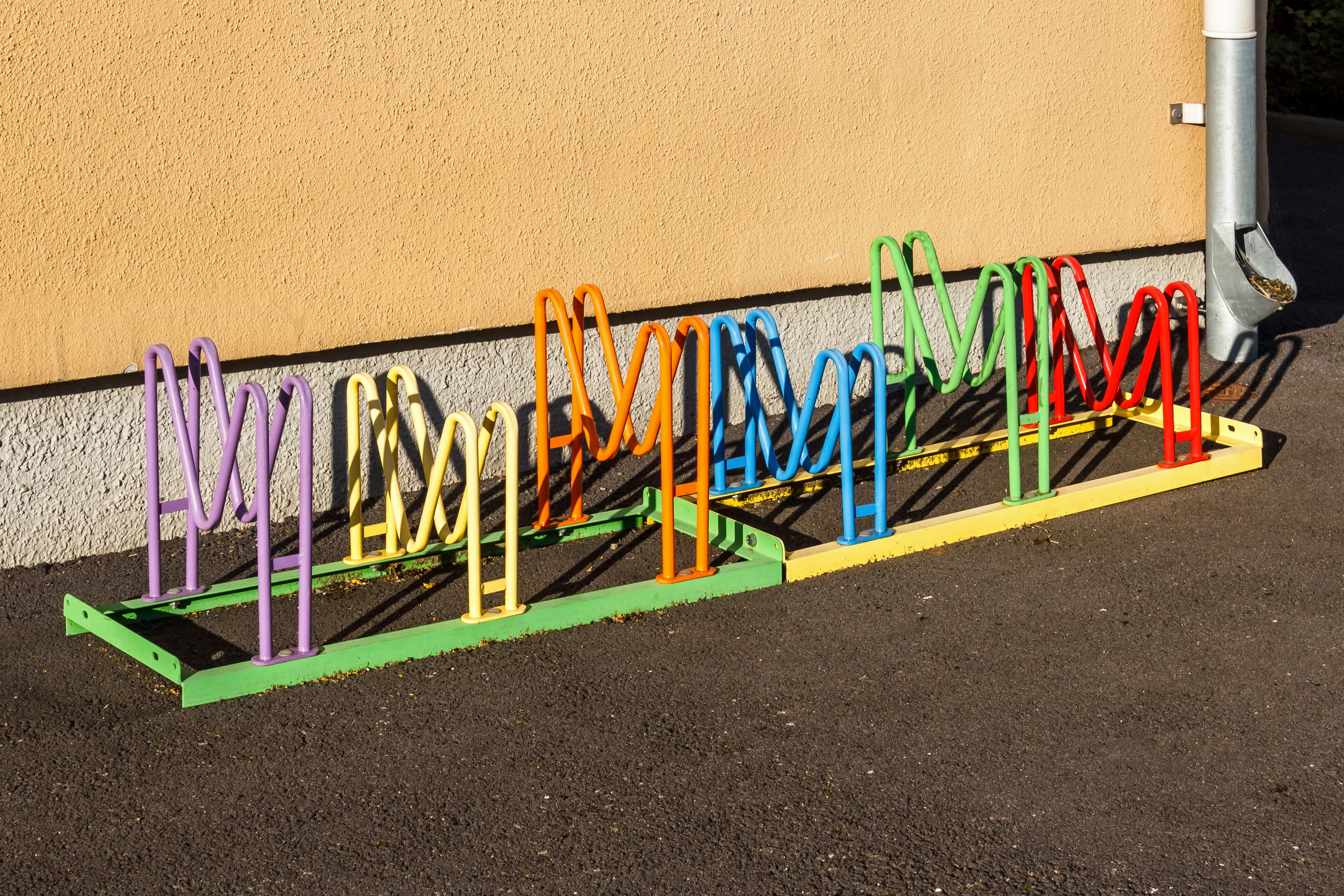
Multi-color metal bicycle parking rack in Lysekil, Sweden

- Bicycle parking, general topic of parking bicycles.
  - Bicycle tree, automated bicycle storage device.
  - Bicycle locker, a similar device, that can offer even more security.
  - Bicycle parking station, a purpose-built building or structure for the secure parking of bicycles.
  - "Sucker pole", a term referring to insecure poles from which parked bicycles get stolen easily.
- Bicycle lock, a device to secure a bicycle to a bike rack.
- Work stand, a device for holding a bicycle still to facilitate working on it.
- Bicycle theft, the crime of stealing a bicycle.
