= Skunklock =

Bicycle locking device

- Type: bicycle lock
- Inventor: Daniel Idzkowski and Yves Perrenoud
- Inception: 2017
- Manufacturer: Skunklock
- Available: June 2017 (announced)
- Website: http://skunklock.com/

The Skunklock is a brand of bicycle lock for securing a bicycle to a pole or other fixture. It is similar to a standard U-lock. Its cylindrical body contains a noxious chemical inside that is released if the body is cut. The chemical compound is meant to be a deterrent to someone attempting to cut the lock and steal the bicycle. The lock is being funded through crowdfunding, with an announced shipping date of June 2017.

== Design ==
The Skunklock is constructed of medium-carbon steel like a typical U-Lock, but contains a pressurized gas that will spray out if the lock is cut.

The makers of Skunklock compare the effects to those of pepper spray, but note that the formula for the chemical inside is proprietary. They say it will temporarily disable a thief by inducing vomiting in 99 percent of people, while making it difficult to see and breathe. The chemicals used are food-grade and non-toxic, sharing chemical similarities to Swedish fermented herring.

Skunklock is being financed through a crowdfunding campaign on Indiegogo, which launched in October 2016 with a goal of $20,000 in pre-orders. The makers announced later that month that they had achieved their funding goal.
