= Orphan bicycle =

Abandoned bicycle in a public space

Report from Amsterdam on abandoned bicycles (Polygoonjournaal, 1958)

Abandoned bicycles in Amsterdam (Polygoonjournaal, 1970)

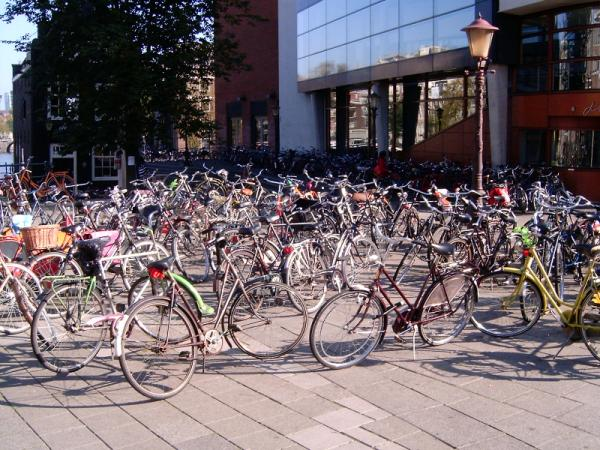
Wildparked bicycles - among these there are often abandoned bicycles

An orphan bicycle is a bicycle that is left in public space and has not been used for a long time. The owner is often unknown. They are sometimes called abandoned bikes or ownerless bikes, but this is an imprecise term as it is often difficult to verify whether the bike is stolen or simply abandoned. Since bicycle registration usually is not mandatory, it is often very difficult to find the owner.

== Environmental issues ==
Orphan bicycles are an environmental problem littering the streets. They very often take up bicycle parking spaces in central locations that could have been used by others. Many bicycles are also thrown at the sea, in rivers or in other nature, which disturbs wildlife and can be considered vandalism. There have also been examples of abandoned bicycles starting rescue operations.

Orphan bicycles can often lack essential parts such as saddle, handlebars or wheels, which spoil the streetscape. These parts may have been stolen, or may have been taken off the bike before the owner got rid of it.

== Legal status ==
Refurbishing stolen or abandoned bikes is a legal gray area as it is difficult to verify whether the bike is stolen or just abandoned. The bicycles can be stolen goods. They are often stored for longer periods, possibly to "cool down" after bicycle theft. In other cases, there are bicycles that the owner has left on purpose for various reasons, for example because they consider it obsolete.

== Procedures for finding the owner ==
Before an abandoned bicycle is removed, for example, municipalities may have a practice of marking the bicycle with an eye-catching marking such as a sticker to warn the owner. If the bike is not removed after a few weeks, it may be taken to a municipal depot. If possible, it will be checked whether the bicycle has been registered as stolen, but due to the low proportion of bicycle registrations, this is often difficult. If the owner can be identified they can be offered to pick up their bike within a deadline, and often for a fee. In practice, such bikes are rarely picked up.

== Reuse for bike sharing ==
Luud Schimmelpennink was part of the Dutch counterculture movement Provo which in the mid-1960s focused on provoking a violent response from authorities by using non-violent methods. When Luud joined Amsterdam's city council in 1967, he proposed the Wittefiestenplan, that all abandoned bicycles that were collected should be painted white and placed back on the streets so that they could be used by everyone.

== See also ==
- Bicycle-sharing system
- Ghost bicycle
