= Bike registry =

Database of bicycles and their ownership

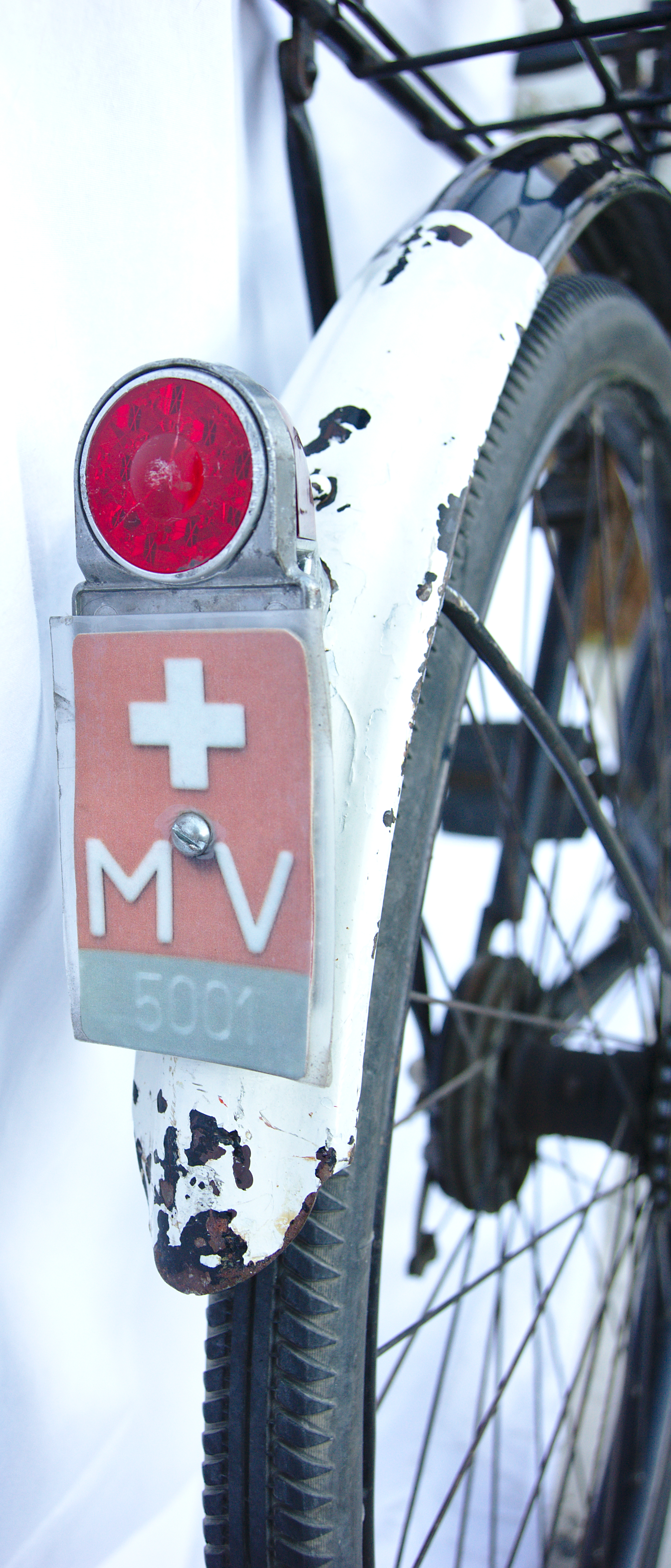
Bicycle number plate

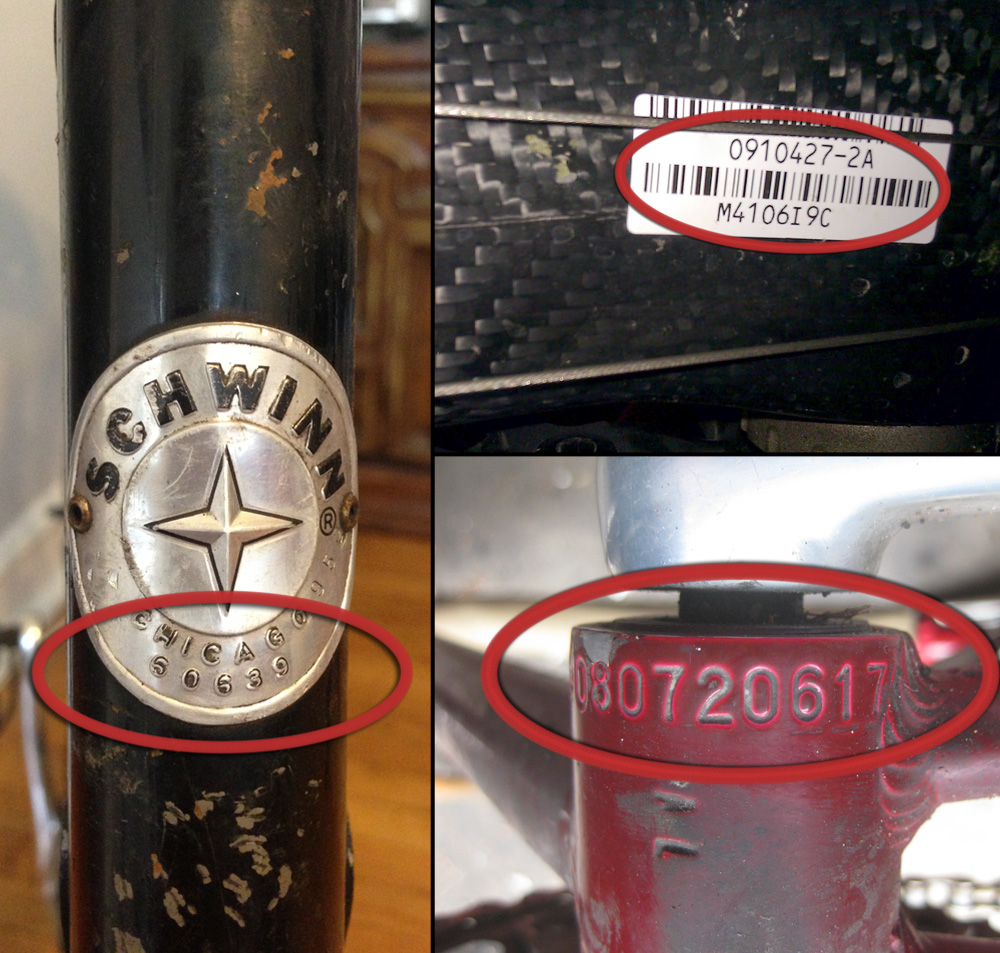
Examples of bicycle serial numbers.

Bike registries are databases of unique, identifying information about bicycles and their ownership. Most registration programs use the unique serial numbers which are permanently affixed to most bicycles during manufacture.

Bicycle registration programs generally aim to reduce the prevalence of bike theft. Bicycle theft is one of the major factors that slow the development of utility cycling since it discourages people from investing in a bicycle.

Bicycle registration may be a public service provided by a local, state or national government, or be provided by an independent organization.

Some registration programs are exclusively designed for spreading the word after a bike has been stolen, while others focus on registering bikes before they are stolen.

== Purpose ==
Bike registration is intended to provide:

1. An element of security (such as at schools and universities)
2. A means of theft deterrence and a method of recovery in the event of theft

Bikes are stolen in large numbers in many parts of the world.

- In Copenhagen approximately 20,000 annually.
- In the United States, according to Bike Index's 2025 Bike Theft Report, 2.4 million annually.
- In the United Kingdom according to the Crime Survey for England and Wales of the Office for National Statistics thefts peaked at 660,000 in 1995, and dropped to 290,000 in 2017, the latest year for which survey statistics were available in 2021; about one third of this number of thefts were reported to police. During the 2020 coronavirus pandemic thefts dropped according to police figures, but were expected to rise afterwards. Only about 5% of stolen bikes are returned to their owners. About a quarter of people whose bicycle is stolen stop cycling, and 66% cycle less often. The UK BikeRegister database, used by the police to recover and return stolen bicycles, reached its millionth registration in January 2021.
- In the Czech Republic in 2012, there were almost 8000 bicycles reported stolen, 1260 of them in the Moravian-Silesian Region, 368 of them in the city of Ostrava. It is thought that most thefts are not reported because the rate of recovery is infinitesimal.

== Procedure ==
At many schools and universities, all bikes brought onto campus are routinely required to be registered by their owners and to display prominently their annual school-provided registration decal.

Some states in the US, such as California, have laws which allow cities and municipalities to require registration of bikes. The registration period typically is in excess of one year. Building on existing law, California has passed a bill in 2014 that will allow cities, counties or regional park districts to impose an annual vehicle registration surcharge of up to $5 to pay for local bike lanes and trails, valid until Jan. 1, 2025.

Several commercial and peer based bike registries exist for the purpose of theft deterrence and to improve the probability of recovery in the event of loss. The registration period typically is from 1 year to unlimited. Some commercial and peer-to-peer registries are typically preventive in nature and are performed prior to loss, while other registries perform their service only after a theft occurs.

The bike owner generally supplies detailed bike information to the registrar such as: manufacturer, model, frame style, frame material, wheel diameter, serial number, color, frame size, and accessory details. Contact information pertaining to the owner is also included in the registration process.

== Marking ==
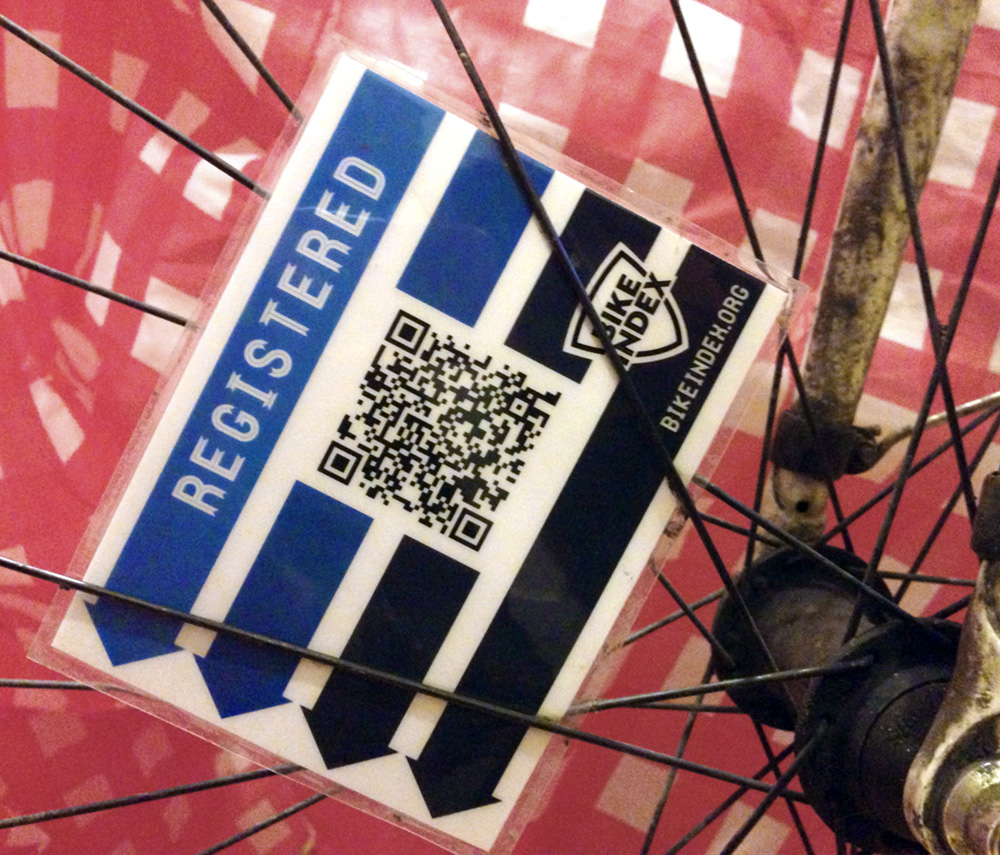
Bike Index registration spoke card in a front wheel, with a QR code to provide information about the bike and a link to its registration.

The registrar may provide a decal or decal kit to the bike owner such that their bike can be easily identified as being registered. Decals at academic institutions may have their color/design changed on an annual basis and can be fairly large such that they can be easily seen at a distance. Decals issued by municipalities are typically of a design similar to academic decals, but not changed annually.

Decals provided by commercial and peer based registries vary in size. Tamper-resistant decals are made from specialty adhesives and/or construction so that they will be difficult to remove from the bike in the event of a theft and will be able to assist in the recovery and return effort. Some registrars engrave a registration number on the bottom bracket or another part of the bike.

RFID (Radio-frequency identification) has been widely used for identification of such things as livestock, pets and industrial commodities. There is a trend by some registrars to use RFID, in conjunction with decal identification, as a means of rapidly determining bike ownership by law enforcement agencies.

/*Bicycle DNA*/ is a free registration program that is offered by protechDNA, there are over 8,000 active law enforcement agencies that utilize this technology. Your bicycle registration also links your serial number and description into a law enforcement database that will cross match your details with pawn shop transactions, providing notification to bicycle owners even if the bicycle is not recovered by law enforcement. The registration is available on a free mobile app for both Apple and Android devices.

With your registration you can get a packet of adhesive gel, the adhesive packet includes thousands of microscopic dots, each dot is smaller than the size of a grain of sand, and etched with a PIN. That PIN is linked to the bicycle owners account and contact details. The program includes a bicycle marking template where the owner should apply the DNA adhesive so law enforcement can locate it.

In the Czech Republic, since 2013, a commercial register CEREK (Central Registration of Bicycles) uses classical imprinted numbering of the bicycle frames, lately supplemented by QR code stickers. This system claims about 100 partners among municipal police corps and tens among bicycle dealers. Similarly, the city of Ostrava started marking bicycles with an Australian synthetic-DNA DataDotDNA spraying technology (so-called "Forensic Marking") in 2013. Since 2013, other cities and towns have founded their own local registers and in 2015, a central register (known as REFIZ) operated by the Asociace forenzního identifikačního značení (AFIZ, Association of the Forensic Identification Marking) was created. The modern DNA marking system is widely supported by the Ministry of Interior by promotion as well as by grants which enable cities and municipal police corps to offer the marking for free. In May 2016, 17 cities were joined to the system, the largest of them are Ostrava and Plzeň, 12 of the cities are from the Moravian-Silesian Region. The activity has an ambition for cross-border pervasion to Slovakia and Poland. The DNA marking is used also for wheelchairs.

In Latvia, a voluntary online registration system for bicycles (and cycle rickshaws) is managed by the Road Traffic Safety Directorate (CSDD), the national department of motor vehicles, as a part of its State Register of Vehicles and their Drivers. After submitting the registration and paying a small fee, a barcode registration sticker is sent to the applicant by mail.

== Fees charged ==
Fees can vary. Most peer based registries are free or charge a very nominal fee. School and university bike registration fees range from $2 to $5 for a single-year registration. Fees for commercial registrars typically range from $10 to $25 for multi-year registration, though Bike Index provides free registration forever. For RFID there can be a surcharge of $15 onto the base registration fee.

== Access to registry information ==
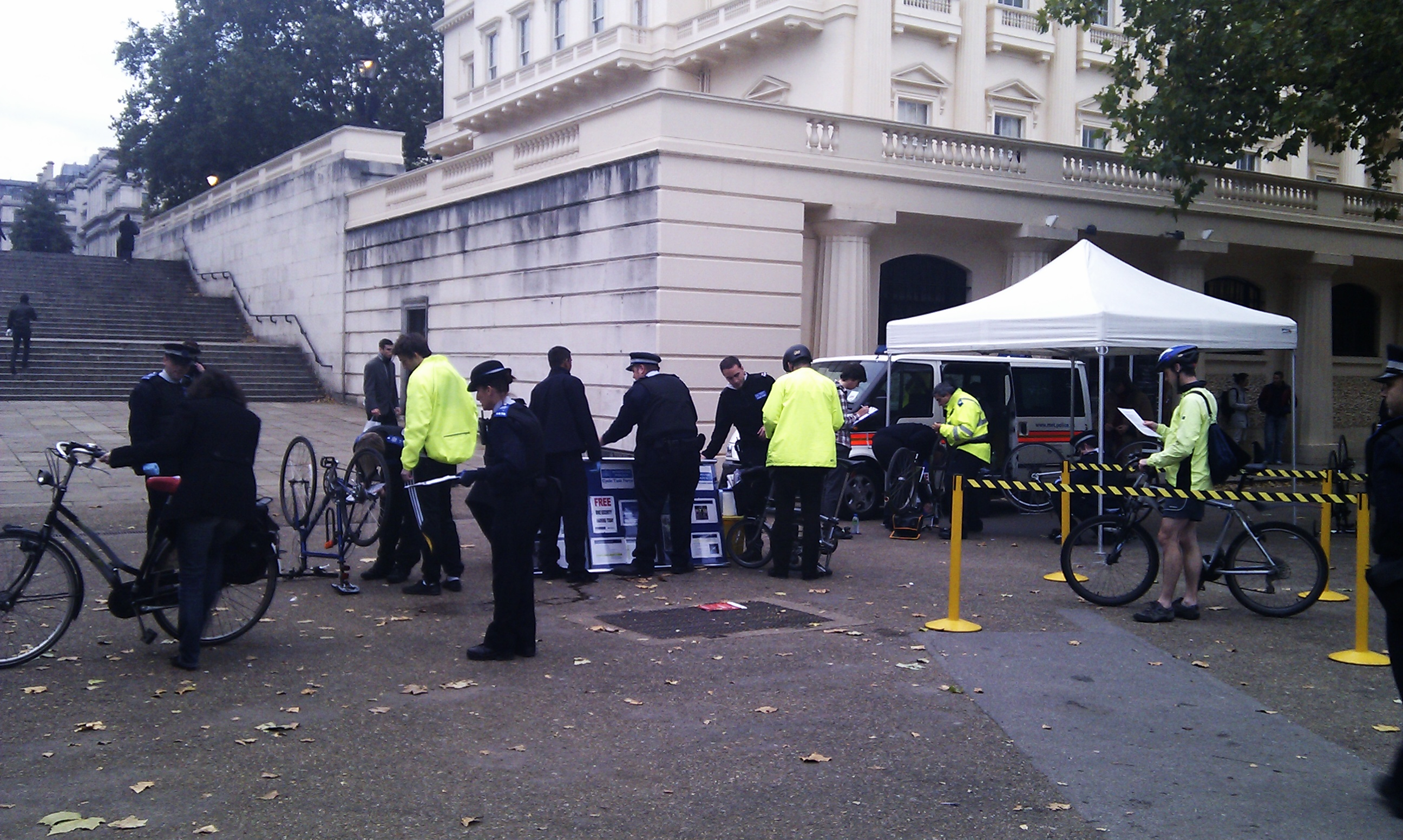
People with bikes in London

Access to school, university and municipality registry databases is typically limited to the law enforcement agency in charge of the registration program; commercial registrars make their registration information available to law enforcement agencies upon request; and peer-to-peer registries make their stolen bike information publicly available via the Internet.

== See also ==
- List of bicycle registers
- Danish bicycle VIN-system, a bicycle marking system where a unique code is engraved into the bicycle frame.
- National Bike Registry
- Bike Index
- Orphan bicycle, an abandoned bicycle in the public
