= Bike Index =

Free online bike registry

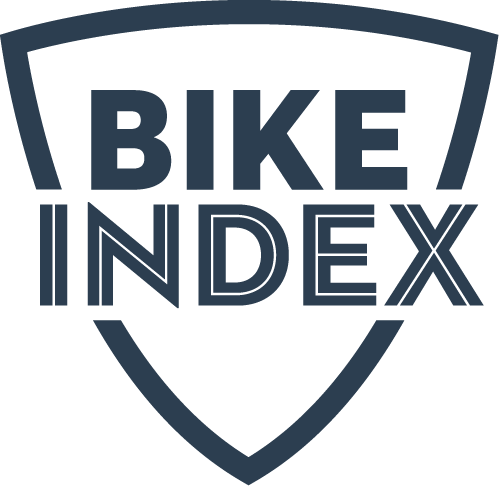

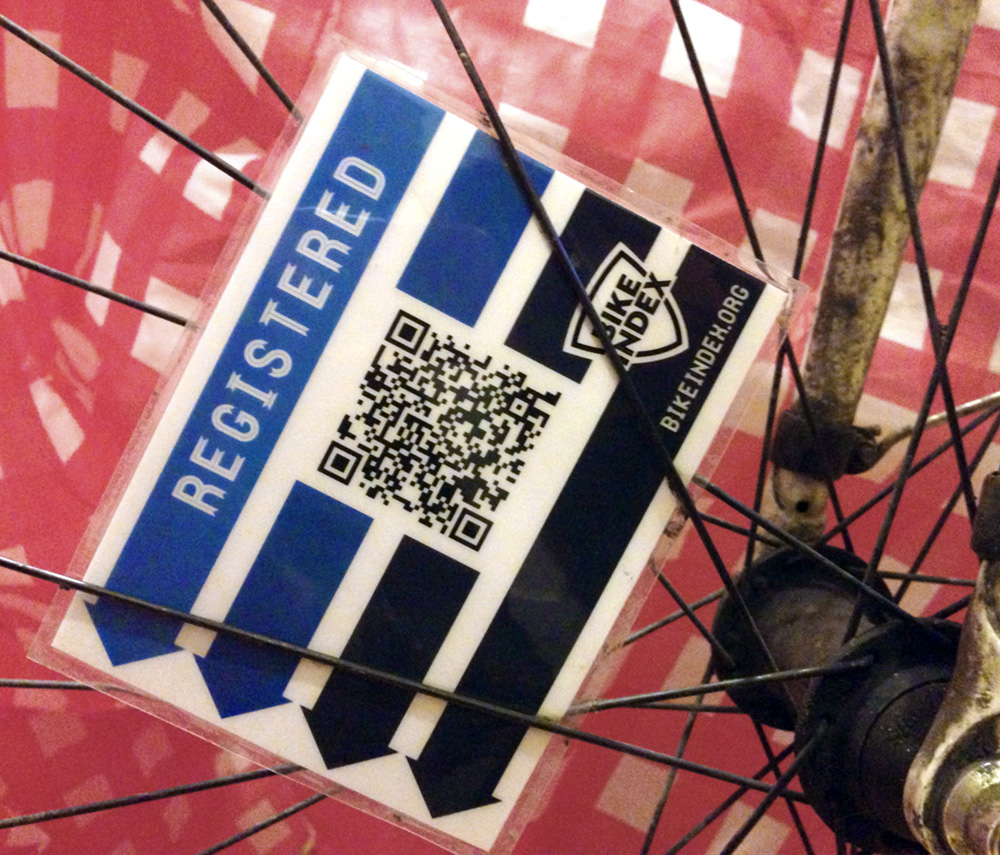
- A Bike Index registration card (with a QR code) attached to a bicycle.
- Predecessor: Stolen Bike Registry (founded in 2004)
- Formation: June 15, 2013; 13 years ago
- Founder: Seth Herr and Bryan Hance
- Type: 501(c)(3)
- Tax ID no.: 81-4296194
- Legal status: Nonprofit organization (formerly a benefit corporation)
- Purpose: A universal bicycle registry
- Headquarters: Chicago, Illinois
- Services: Bike registry
- Methods: Peer-to-peer, open source, free, volunteer-supported
- Members: Over 1,215,000 cataloged bikes (2023)
- Official language: English
- Affiliations: 950 U.S. and 200 international partner organizations
- Website: bikeindex.org

Bike Index is a free, nonprofit bicycle registration service based in Chicago, Illinois, created to help track and recover stolen bicycles in different cities or even countries. The index hopes to improve on other bicycle registries by being free, not limited to a geographical area, and having a searchable database available online for anyone trying to find and get back a stolen bicycle.

As of mid-2025, the index claims to have 1,429,000 cataloged bikes, 1,780 community partners, registered 158,775 stolen bikes, and helped recover 15,996 stolen bicycles.

== History ==
The predecessor of Bike Index was the Stolen Bike Registry, founded in 2004 by Bryan Hance. Bike Index was founded in 2013 with a Kickstarter campaign, and Stolen Bike Registry was merged into it in 2014.

In 2016, Bike Index announced integration with LeadsOnline, one of the USA's largest pawn search systems used by law enforcement officers to uncover stolen goods. According to Bryan Hance of Bike Index, "one of the first 'hits' was a bike that was stolen in Salt Lake City, Utah and pawned at a shop in Nevada — 400 miles away."

In 2017, data analysis by a student at the NYC Data Science Academy of the openly available Bike Index data showed that approximately a third of the cataloged bicycles were marked as stolen.

As of 2018, Bike Index has both national partner organizations in the US and international partner organizations across the six countries of Canada, China, India, Mozambique, New Zealand, and the United Kingdom. Bike Index claims to be the largest bike registry in the US, and the most widely used Bike Registry in the world.

== How it works ==
Users can register bikes, specify frame serial numbers, list components and any special characteristics, and upload pictures. Bike Index-affiliated organizations, such as some bike shops, can help the customer perform initial registration when they purchase a bike, and the customer can later update their registry as usual. In case of theft, a bicycle can be marked as stolen at bikeindex.org. Having all the bicycle information handy can also make it easier to file a police report. When a bicycle changes ownership, the user can also transfer the entry to the new user.

Bike Index also lets their users privately register serial numbers of the keys to their bike locks, which can make it easier to contact the manufacturer for a replacement key in case the original key is lost.

Both stolen and non-stolen bikes can be registered and listed. The user can choose whether their bike information should be private or public and searchable.

By default, all serial numbers and other bike information are listed publicly in the index to allow faster recovery by allowing anyone to look up the bicycle. This can be important in the early phase when a bicycle has been stolen but not reported stolen yet. If the bike has been marked as stolen at Bike Index, other Bike Index users can write the owner a message through their bike page.

=== User privacy ===
By default, no personal information about the users or email addresses is listed at Bike Index. If they like, users can create an additional personal page that includes any extra contact information they want to share, but this is not required. Users can, for any reason, choose to make their bike and serial number private and non-searchable at Bike Index. Users can choose to sign up anonymously. (Though the index does not recommend it on the grounds that the restriction only helps thieves.)

== See also ==
- National Bike Registry (Project 529), another large Bike registry based in Seattle, Washington.
- List of bicycle registers
