= Danish bicycle VIN-system =

Bicycle identification system in Denmark

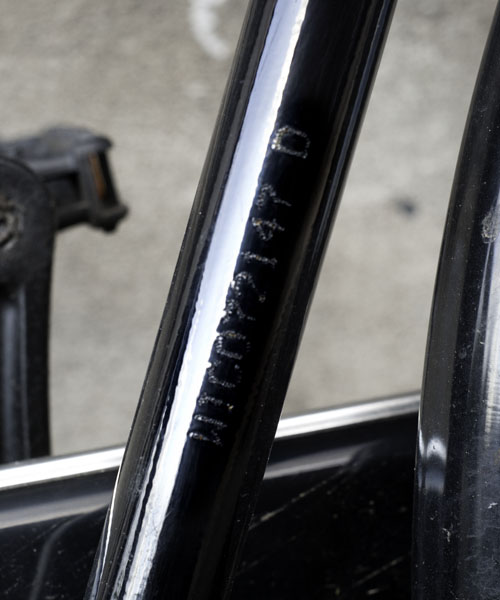
VIN from Ebsen Danmark A/S placed on the seat tube (see also rotated version for readability)

The Danish bicycle VIN-system is a system introduced in 1942 by the Danish government, providing all bicycles in Denmark with a unique code. The VIN code is a combination of letters and digits embedded into the bicycle frame and consists of a manufacturer code, a serial number, and construction year code.

Since 1948, it has been illegal to sell bicycle frames in Denmark without an embedded VIN. Because of this, insurance companies in Denmark will not pay indemnities for stolen bicycles without a VIN.

== Location of the VIN ==
By default, the VIN is to be engraved into the seat tube or the down tube, but if these are made of such a material that hinders this, it may alternately be put on the bottom bracket shell. In very special instances, and only with the approval of the Danish National Police Commissioner’s Office, it may be applied by other means and on other locations.

== Theft ==
The Danish bicycle VIN-system better protects bicycles against theft and makes it possible to check whether a bicycle has been reported stolen. Police in Denmark register stolen bicycles in the bicycle VIN registry. Anyone can check the register of stolen bicycles via the National Police app for android and iPhone.

== Development ==
An innovation group consisting of those from the insurance industry, the Danish Cyclists' Federation, those from the IT industry and traffic experts has proposed a new solution to replace the VIN-system. A chip is one example that could replace the VIN, which could contain more information and allow the bicycle to be tracked via GPS.

== Components of the VIN ==
The bicycle VIN is constructed of three elements: a letter-block, a digit-block and a letter-block:

Block	1	2	3
Description	Manufacturers code	Frame serial number	Production year
Length	1–4 (letters)	1–∞ (digits)	1 (letter)
Example 1	WDA	1234	Z
Example 2	S	57	A

The manufacturers-code, is a 1, 2, 3 or 4-letter block. If the code starts with a W, it is an imported bicycle frame. The second block is the frame serial number from that manufacturer. This shall have at least one digit, but can otherwise have any number of digits. The third block is a single letter code that identifies the production year. Certain limits regarding letters are instated for the VIN:

- I is omitted as it can be confused with 1 (one)
- O is omitted as it can be confused with 0 (zero)
- Y is omitted as it can be confused with V
- W is omitted, to avoid confusion with the manufacturer code (where W is reserved for imported frames)

In the examples above, the first bicycle is a bicycle imported by FDB, with serial number 1234 and made in either 1963, 1984 or 2005. The second bike is an SCO bicycle, with serial number 57, made in 1942, 1964, 1985 or 2006.

=== Common manufacturer codes ===
This table shows examples of manufacturer codes, but is in no way to be considered a complete listing.

Code	Manufacturer name	Code	Manufacturer name	Code	Manufacturer name
A–G		H–P		R–Å	
AK	Centurion (previously Åge Krøll)	HN	Hede Nielsens Fabrikker A/S	RD	Scandinavia Racing Discount
AR	Raleigh (previously Vilhelm Nellemann A/S)	IA^{1}	Ivan A Hansen	REC	Recykel ApS
AV	Winther cykler (alias Anders Winther A/S)	IC^{2}	Ebsen Danmark A/S	SI^{1}	Søgreni cykler
AZ	Jørgensø Import	JE	Jupiter	S	SCO (alias Smith & Co)
BA	Banani (previously Bent A Nielsen)	JKH	Jyde-Kompagniet A/S	SS	SCO (alias Smith & Co)
BL	SCO bicycles sold in the Bilka supermarket chain (see also S)	JWG^{3}	Cykelbanditten	STE	Stangerup Efterfølgere
BK	Kildemoes (alias Børge Kildemoes)	KM	Motobecane	SX	Saxil cykler (also see BN)
BN	Saxil Bicycles (SX until approx. 2000)	LL	Sorte Jernhest	TU	Trek
BT	Taarnby a/s	MB	MBK	TV	Batavus
CC	Christiania Bicycles (also Pedersen-cyklen)	MR	Ritter Import	UR	Urania cykler
CGE	Cykelgear.dk	N	Nordisk Cykelfabrik A/S	VI	VIVA bikes
CK	Jensen cykler (alias C K Jensen)	NH	Nihola Cykler ApS	VEL	Velorbis
CM	Mosquito	PA	Pedal-atleten	VG	Grebart cykler
CPH	CPHBiKE ApS	PD	Steyr-Puch A/S	WTRI	Triobike
CS	Christiania Bicycles	PF	Peter From		
DA	FDB	POL	VIN provided by the police - usually for private import		
DB	Rocky	PL	CREATE		
DI^{1}	Dibbern Cykler	PR	Pro Movec		
EE	Egedesø (alias Everton)	PS	Schrøder cykler		
FAK	Falcon	PY	Python Pro		
GD	Titania Cykler				
GR	L. H. V. Grønning, Skibhusvej 146, Odense				
GW^{3}	G&W Cykler				

^{1}: Even though I in general is not used, it appears that some brands are using it.
^{2}: Even though I in general is not used, Ebsen Danmark A/S bicycles are in fact using it in their manufacturer code (verified).
^{3}: Even though W in general is not used, it appears that some brands are using it.

=== Raleigh WN Variant ===
Two examples of the WN prefix (which denotes "Nordisk Cyklfabrik A/S") have been found so far on Raleigh branded models. Because Raleigh had a long standing policy of shipping out frames to distribution centres in export territories where they would be then built into complete bicycles, it seems highly likely that any Raleigh made frame shipped from England to that particular company and built into a bicycle which was then destined for sale in Denmark, was stamped with the WN prefix.

=== Production year identification codes ===
Please note that since this table was compiled, a Q has been found on a Raleigh frame made in March 1978. This obviously calls into question the entries for letters R to Z but also confirms the years for A to P are accurate.

A	B	C	D	E	F	G	H	J	K	L	M	N	P	Q	R	S	T	U	V	X	Z
1942	1943	1944	1945	1946	1947	1948	1949	1950	1951	1952	1953	1954	1955	1956	1957	1958	1959	1960	1961	1962	1963
1964	1965	1966	1967	1968	1969	1970	1971	1972	1973	1974	1975	1976	1977	-	1978	1979	1980	1981	1982	1983	1984
1985	1986	1987	1988	1989	1990	1991	1992	1993	1994	1995	1996	1997	1998	-	1999	2000	2001	2002	2003	2004	2005
2006	2007	2008	2009	2010	2011	2012	2013	2014	2015	2016	2017	2018	2019	-	2020	2021	2022	2023	2024	2025	2026

== See also ==
- Bicycle locker
- Bicycle theft
- List of bicycle registers
- Outline of cycling
