= Bicycle lock =

Type of lock used to secure bikes

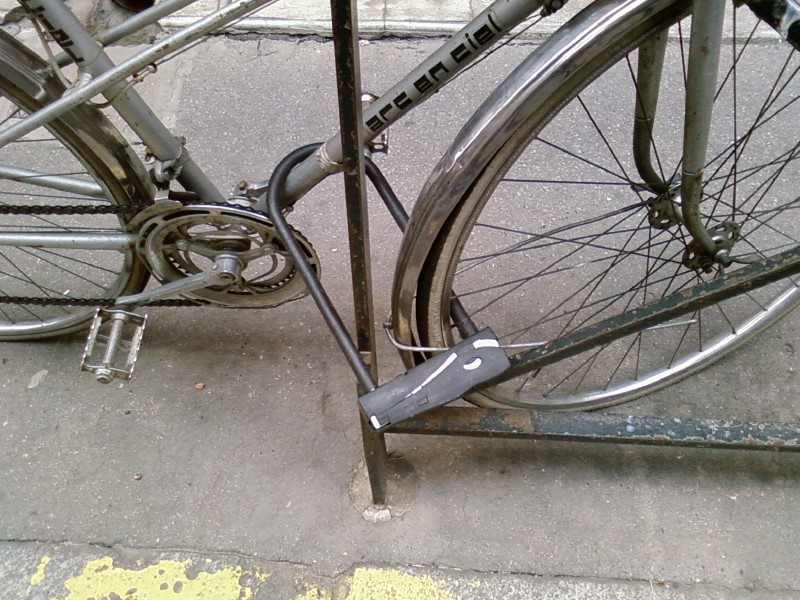
Frame and front wheel secured

A bicycle lock is a security device used to deter bicycle theft, either by simply locking one of the wheels or by fastening the bicycle to a fixed object, e.g., a bike rack.

Locking devices vary in size and security, the most secure tending to be the largest, heaviest and least portable. Thus, like other security equipment, bicycle locks must balance the competing interests of security, portability, and cost. Some are made of particularly expensive materials chosen for their acceptable strength and low density.

== Types ==
=== U-locks and D-locks ===
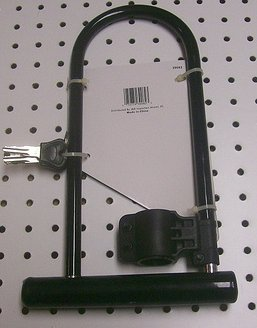
U-lock

A U-lock is a rigid metal ring in the shape of the letter U. The U part of the lock attaches to a crossbar section, and for this reason they are also called D-locks. To lock the bicycle, one locks it physically to some other object, such as a bike rack, parking meter or other pole installed securely in the solid ground. Merely locking the bike frame to the wheel is not recommended because, although it cannot be rolled away, the entire bicycle can still be lifted and carried away or deposited into a vehicle.

U-locks are more secure than most other kinds of locking mechanism because they are more resistant to cutting with high-leverage hand tools such as bolt cutters. A common brute force method to break open U-locks is to use a long length (perhaps 2 metres or 7 feet) of pipe to twist the lock open (although this method is more commonly used to defeat chain and cable locks).

=== Folding locks ===
Folding locks, sometimes also called foldable locks, made from connected steel plates that can be moved around and folded together using hinges. This design makes it much more flexible than a U-lock, at similar strength but slightly more weight. The movable links make it difficult to use saws, and the flat profile also makes it difficult to use bolt cutters. When folded, it is easy to carry, especially when using a frame mount.

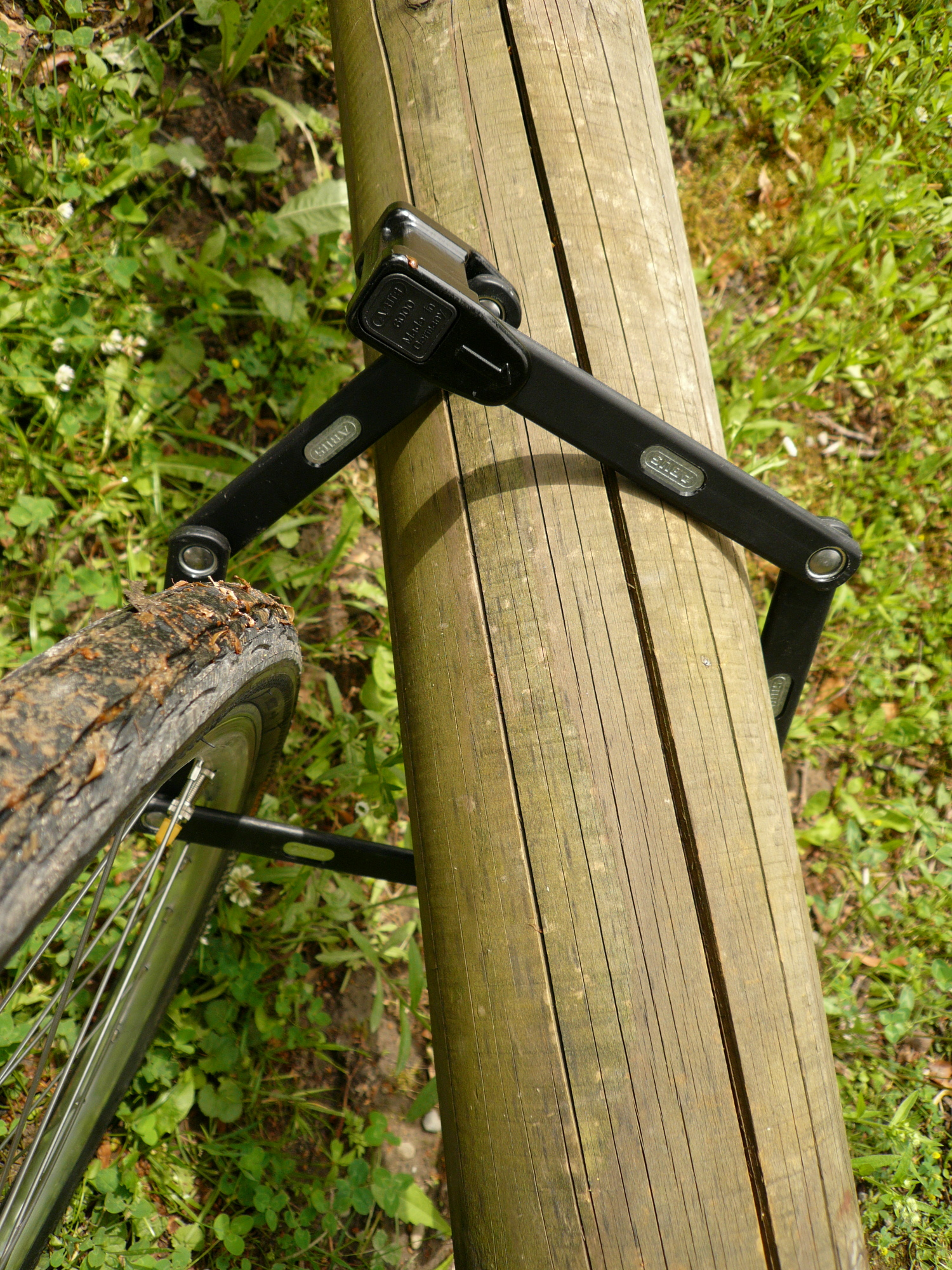
Folding lock in use

Depending on the model, various lengths and security classes are available, and both combination and cylinder locks are also offered. Available lengths range from 75–110 cm (30–43 in), and weights range from 890 to 2,300 grams (2.0 to 5.1 lb)

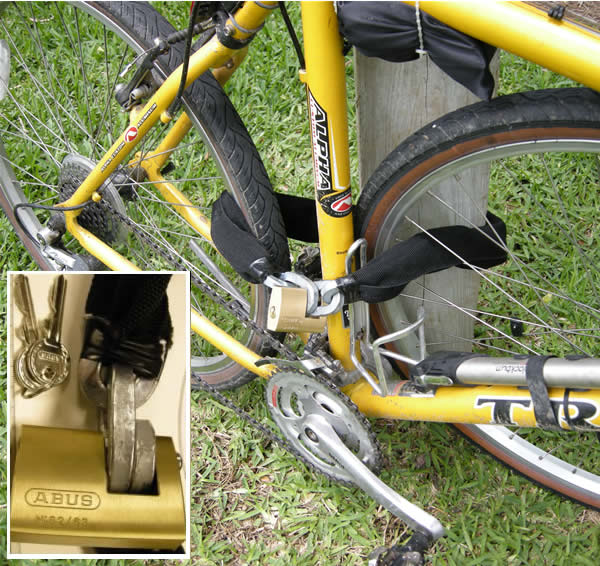
Proper use of a case hardened security chain and monobloc padlock to secure a bicycle

=== Chain ===
A chain lock is a chain with a lock. It often has a key or a combination lock attached to it. A long enough chain can pass through both wheels, the frame and attach the bicycle to an immovable object. Because of their inherent flexibility, chains are easier to secure around tricky-shaped objects than D-locks.

Chains vary widely in their security level. If the chain is bought from a hardware store, it is most likely made from basic iron or steel and can easily be cut with a relatively inexpensive pair of bolt cutters. Chains specifically designed for bike security are often case hardened and may feature Hexagonal or Trapezoidal link surfaces more impervious to hand tools.

A chain is only as strong as its weakest link, which may be the lock itself. Although a cheap keyed or combination lock may be an appropriate match for a hardware store chain, a case-hardened security chain necessitates a specialized lock such as a monobloc padlock or mini u-lock. Compared to other locks, chains tend to be the heaviest solution, especially in the case of long and/or tough chains.

=== Cable locks ===
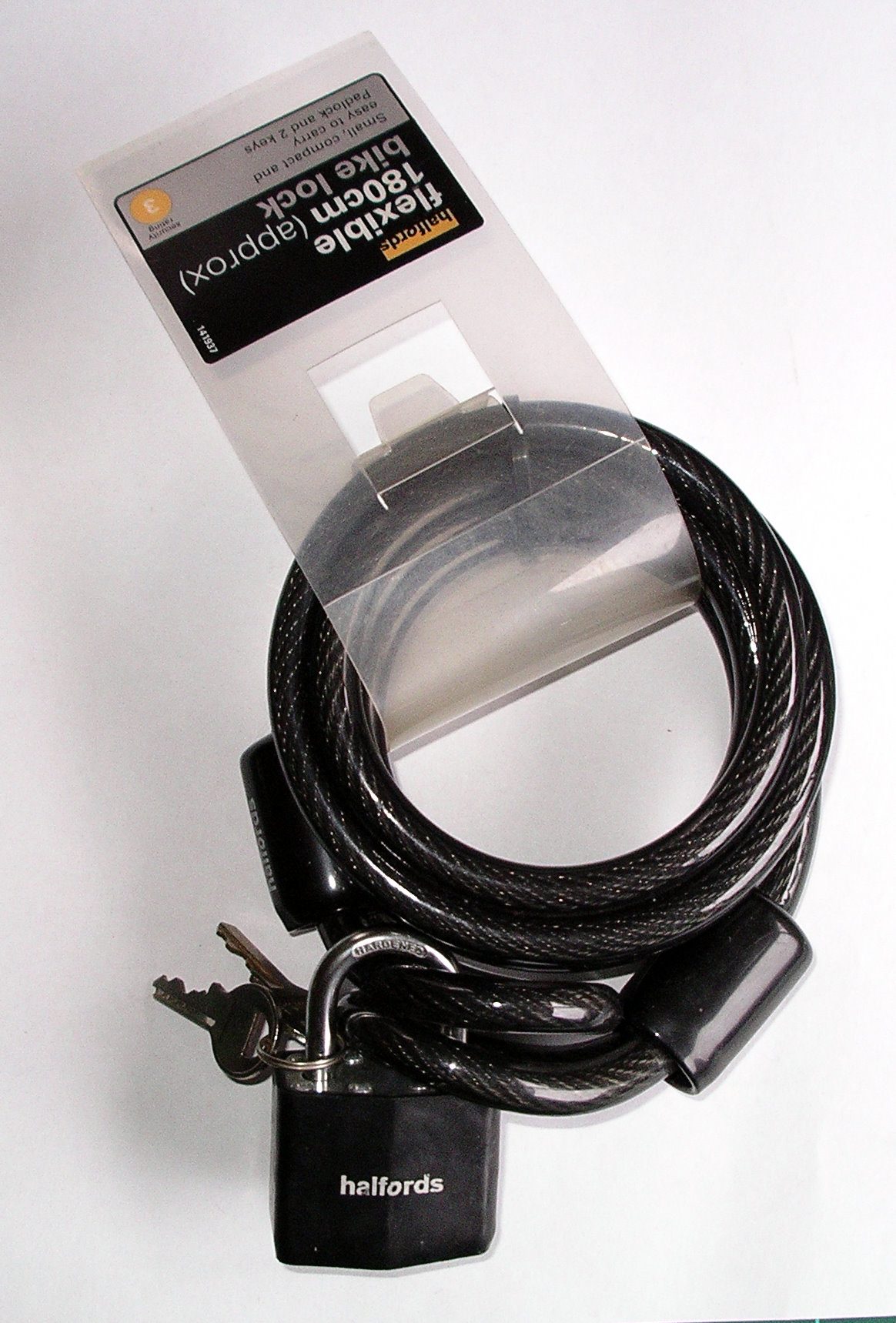
Padlock and cable from Halfords

Cable locks are in many ways similar to chain locks. Cable locks often come with the locking mechanism already permanently integrated. Otherwise, a length of cable with loops on both ends can also be used.

The main advantage of cable locks over chains is the ease of transporting them. Simple cable locks, however, are only sufficient for use in low-risk areas. Even the largest diameter unprotected cable can be quickly cut with bolt cutters. More robust cable locks have overlapping steel jackets threaded over the cable. This can make it more difficult to cut the central cable.

Many cyclists use a long cable to secure bicycle components (such as the wheels or seat) in conjunction with a U-lock or padlock to secure the frame. Special strong cables are available which are made with a loop at each end continuous with the cable, which enable linking with a locking device.

A common design flaw among low-quality combination-lock cables allows thieves to peer into the grooves between the disks. This allows them to decipher the unlock combination while cycling through the individual numbers on each disk. Also, if the number of disks is low, the thief doesn't even need to peer into it and can simply use a brute-force attack (try every combination until it opens).

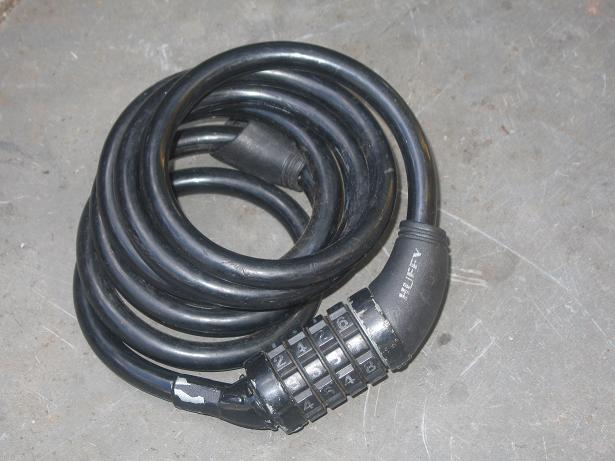
Cable with combination lock

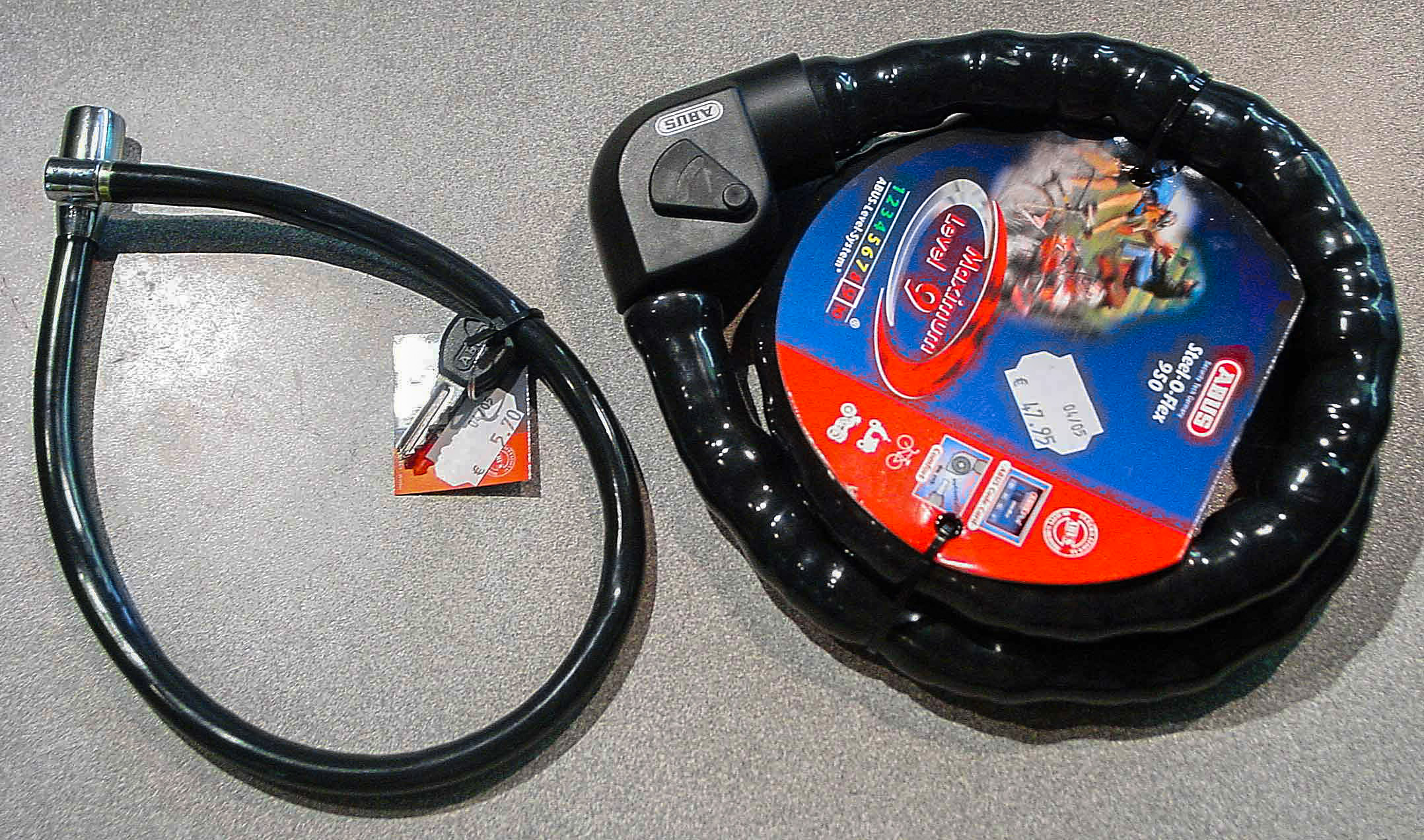
Simple cable lock (left) and steel-jacketed cable lock

=== Ring lock ===
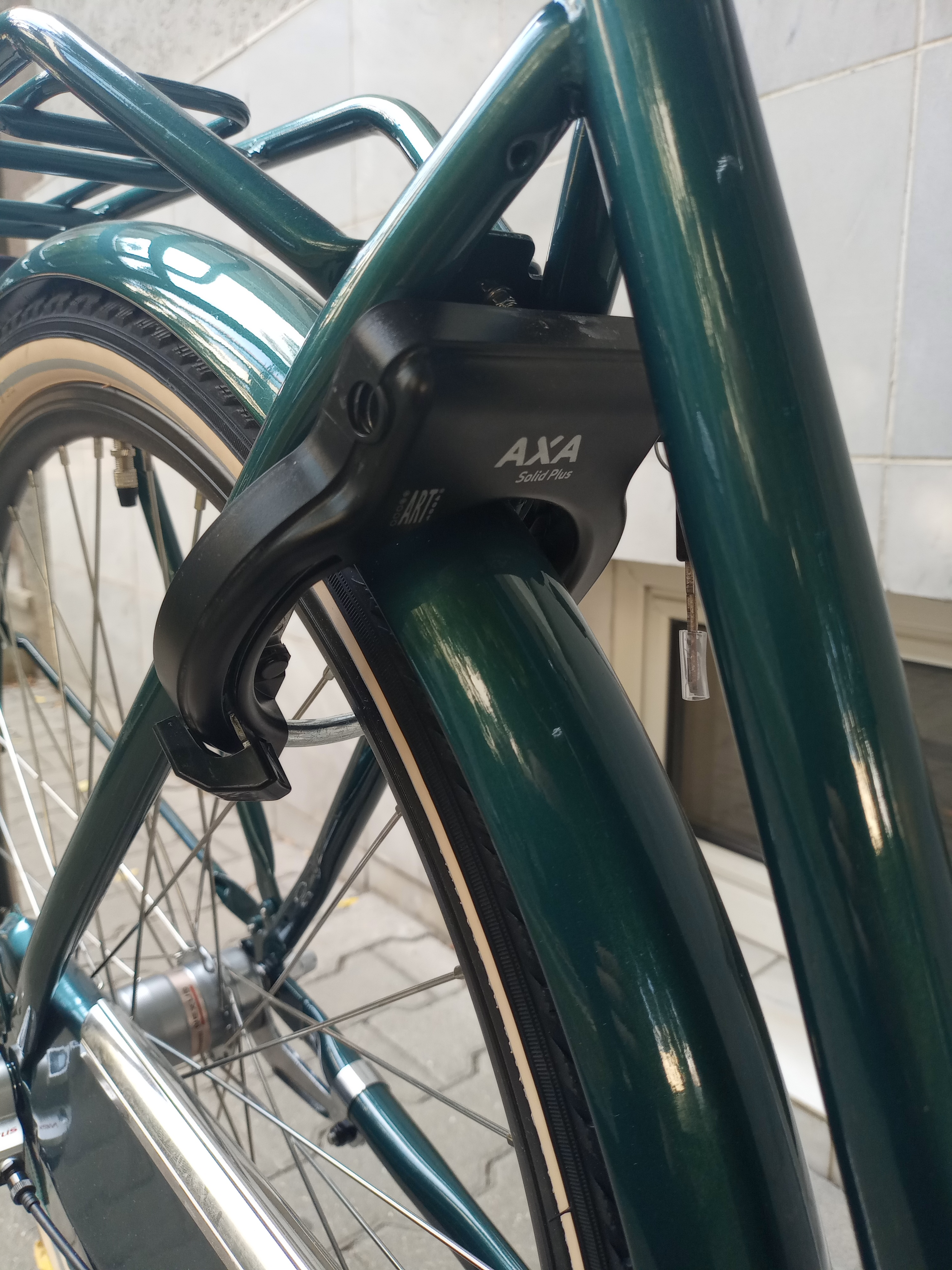
This ring lock immobilizes the rear wheel while allowing an extra chain to be plugged in to lock the frame.

Also called wheel lock, frame lock or an O-lock. This is a low security mechanism mounted on the frame that immobilizes the rear wheel by moving a steel bolt through the spokes to prevent motion.

A ring lock prevents riding the bicycle but does not, by itself, secure the bicycle to a stationary object. This type of lock is effective and convenient for securing a bicycle against opportunistic theft when the bike is left unattended momentarily. It forces the thief to carry the bicycle. It is a common way to secure bicycles when someone is at home, if their company provides indoor bicycle parking, and at railway station parking.

The ring lock also conveniently secures the rear wheel: only locking the frame is needed, to secure both the frame and the rear wheel. Used in addition to a U-lock it can be a convenient second lock. Many models have an optional cable or chain that plugs into the body of the lock to enable the bicycle to be secured as well.

=== Smart locks ===
Smart locks use Bluetooth technology to allow a lock to be unlocked with a smartphone, and can send a notification if they are breached. Several smart bicycle locks have been produced through crowdfunding and sold as consumer products. Some bicycle-sharing systems also use them. Smart locks introduce added security risks through the possibility of hacking.

=== Disc rotor locks ===
Disc brakes are a popular braking system for bicycles, most notable for mountain bikes but recently there has been an increase in their popularity for road bikes, especially after the UCI approved them for use in professional races in May 2018.

Disc rotor locks have been popular for motorcyclists for many years but with the proliferation of bicycles now using them smaller, more compact versions for bicycles have been created. They work by inserting a metal pin through the hole in the disc rotor between the seatstay and chainstay, preventing the wheel from rotating and virtually immobilising the rear wheel. The locks themselves are small, metal devices that sit around the edge of the disc rotor and are locked with a key insertion.

== Standards and tests ==
Test standards that rate the effective security of bicycle locks are provided by various companies and organizations, depending on location.

In the UK, a lock certified by Sold Secure or Thatcham is usually required in order to insure a bicycle or motorcycle against theft.

Tests carried out on behalf of Cycle magazine showed that all of the bicycle locks tested, which had a variety of certifications, could be broken in less than 42 seconds. Cables and chains were breached using either small cable cutters or 90 cm (36 in) bolt croppers, and D-locks were breached using a stubby bottle jack. Of the locks tested, five had a Sold Secure Gold rating, varying in price from £25 to £100. Two of these Gold rated locks withstood only 10 seconds of attack.

The Dutch consumer news show Kassa 3 published a four-minute show in which a former bicycle thief removed eight consumer-grade locks (cheaper than €30 / ≈$40) from a bike in times ranging from 10 to a maximum of 84 seconds. The locks included those from manufacturers ABUS, Hema and Halfords.

== Effectiveness ==
Bicycle locks are only effective when they are used on secure objects. For example, a bicycle lock is useless when connected to a "sucker pole", which is a pole that gives the biker the appearance of security. A bicycle thief may target the bicycle because the pole can be quickly and easily dismantled, even in broad daylight.

== See also ==
- Bicycle locker
- Bicycle parking
- Bicycle stand - also known as bicycle rack
- Bicycle tree
- Bicycle transportation engineering
- Bike registry
- Wheel clamp
