= National Bike Registry =

US bicycle registration database

Founded in 1984, the National Bike Registry (NBR) pioneered the concept of a cross-jurisdictional bicycle registration database within the United States to facilitate the return of stolen bikes to rightful owners. Originally headquartered in North Highlands, California, NBR offered bicycle registration for a fee of $10 for 10 years. The fee included a bike sticker with a registration number which made it possible for law enforcement officers to contact the owners of found or recovered bikes.

On January 31, 2017, Project 529, Inc. (a private for-profit bike registry based in Seattle) acquired the National Bike Registry and merged the NBR registration database into its own to create the largest bike registry database in the world. Bike registration is now free and can be completed using the 529 Garage app or at project529.com. The database now contains over 1.7 million searchable bikes. J Allard (born James Allard) is the CEO of Project 529.

The Vancouver Police Department, the Vancouver Police Foundation and the City of Vancouver in British Columbia adopted the Project 529 platform in 2015. The collaboration is credited with helping reduce bike theft there by over 35%. Vancouver is now considered a world leader in fighting bike theft.

The Project 529 program rapidly expanded throughout North America and captured the attention of the World Bank.

== See also ==
- Bike Index a large non-profit bike registry
- J Allard
