= Bolt cutter =

Tool for cutting metal

Bolt cutters animation

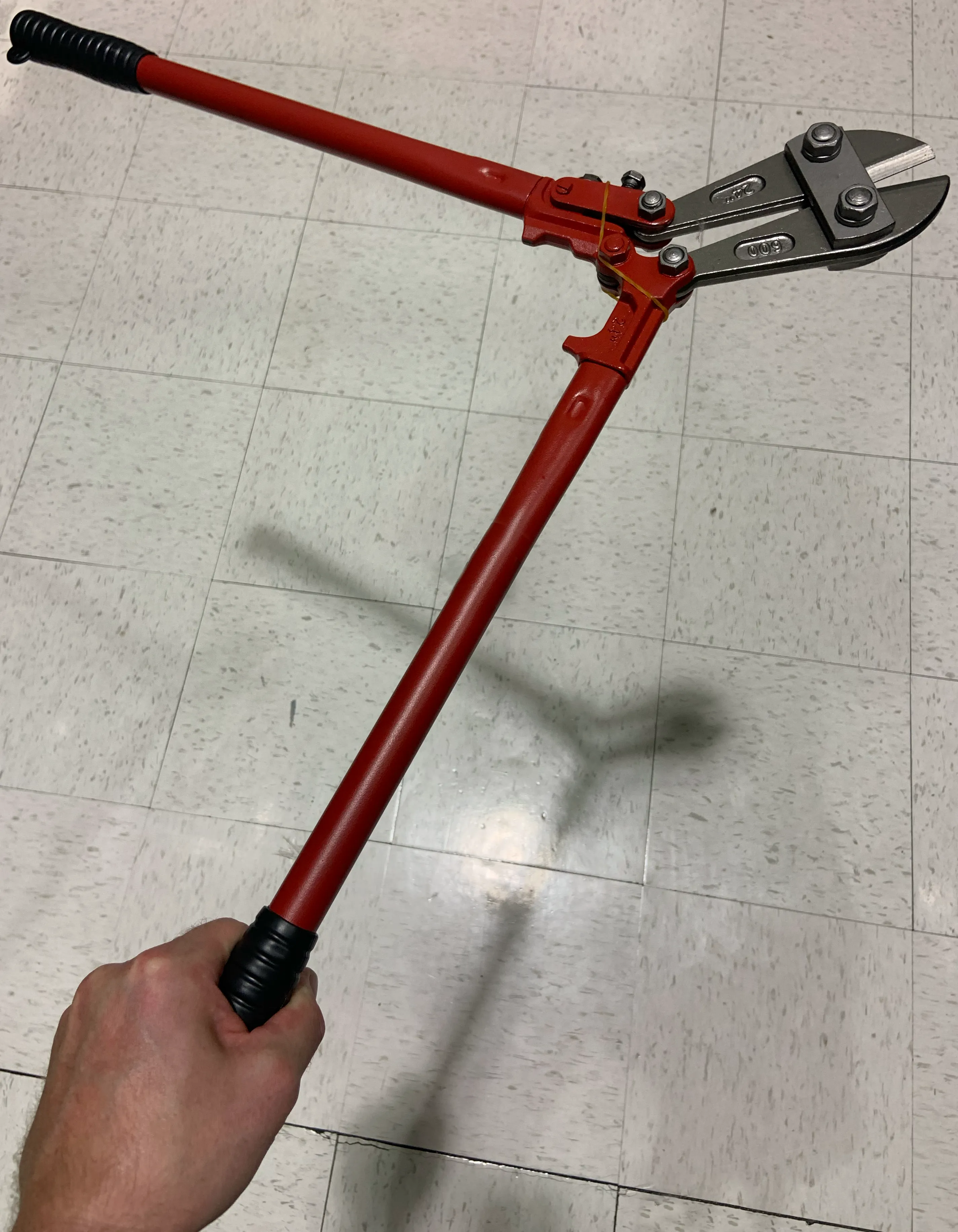
Bolt cutter

A bolt cutter, sometimes called bolt cropper, is a tool used for cutting bolts, chains, padlocks, rebar and wire mesh. It typically has long handles and short blades, with compound hinges to maximize leverage and cutting force. A typical bolt cutter yields 20 kilonewtons (4,500 lb_{f}) of cutting force for a 250 newtons (56 lb_{f}) force on the handles.

There are different types of cutting blades for bolt cutters, including angle cut, center cut, shear cut, and clipper cut blades. Bolt cutters are usually available in 12, 14, 18, 24, 30, 36 and 42 inches (30.5, 35.6, 46, 61, 76, 91.4 and 107 cm) in length. The length is measured from the tip of the jaw to the end of the handle.

- Angle cut has the cutter head angled for easier insertion. Typical angling is 25 to 35 degrees.
- Center cut has the blades equidistant from the two faces of the blade.
- Shear cut has the blades inverted to each other (such as normal paper scissor blades).
- Clipper cut has the blades flush against one face (for cutting against flat surfaces).

Bolt cutters with fiberglass handles can be used for cutting live electrical wires and are useful during rescue operations. The fiberglass handles have another advantage of being lighter in weight than the conventional drop forged or solid pipe handles, making it easier to carry to the place of operation.

== Cultural significance ==
The tools became iconic at the Greenham Common Women's Peace Camp, where protestors used bolt cutters to remove fencing around the RAF airbase. A Greenham banner displaying bolt cutters, together with a hanging of Greenham fence wire, was displayed at the Pine Gap Women's Peace Camp in Australia.
