= Bicycle theft =

Theft of bicycles or bicycle parts

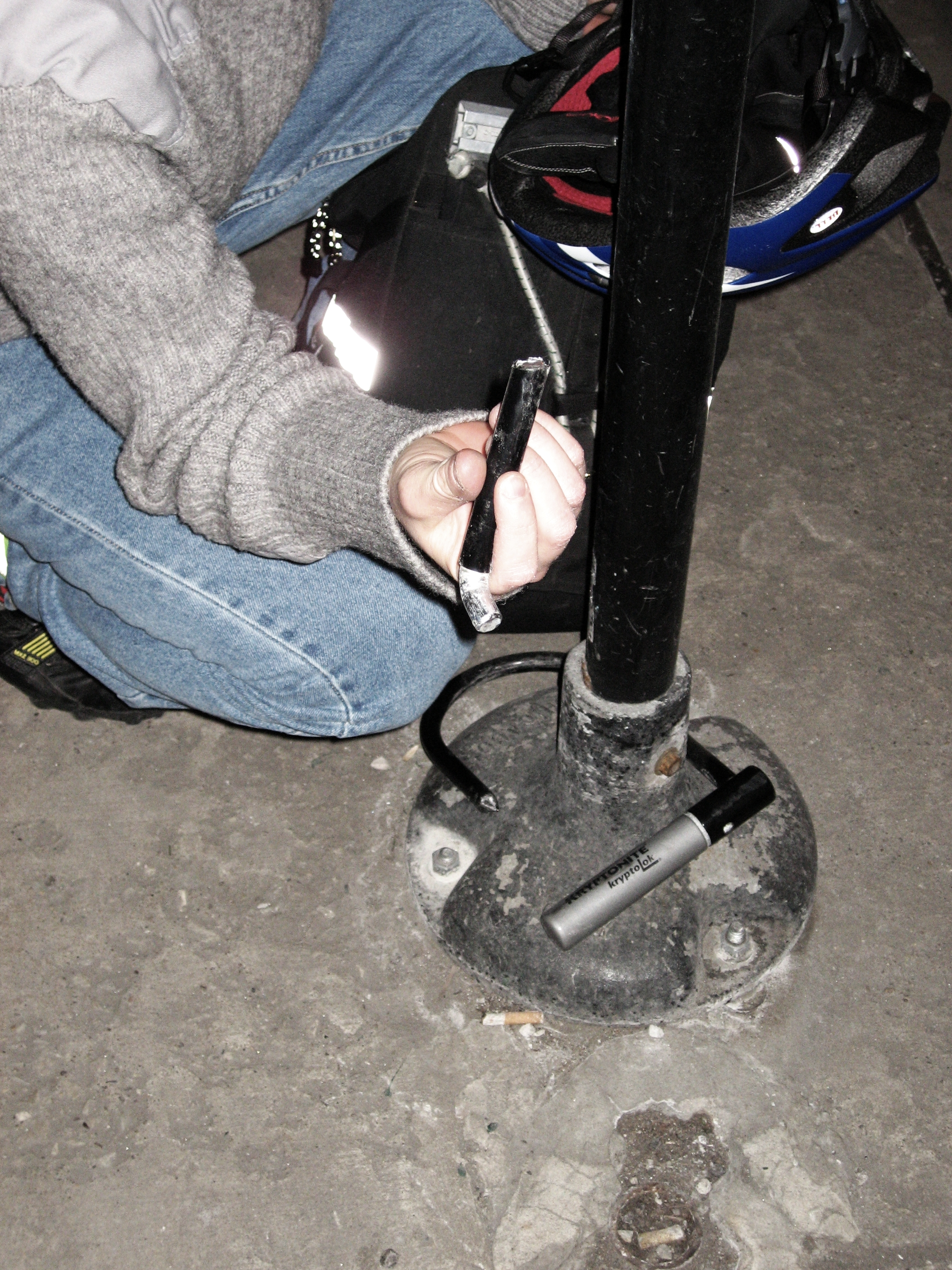
A severed bicycle U-lock lying loose around a street sign pole in Chicago, Illinois has been apparently defeated by bolt cutters.

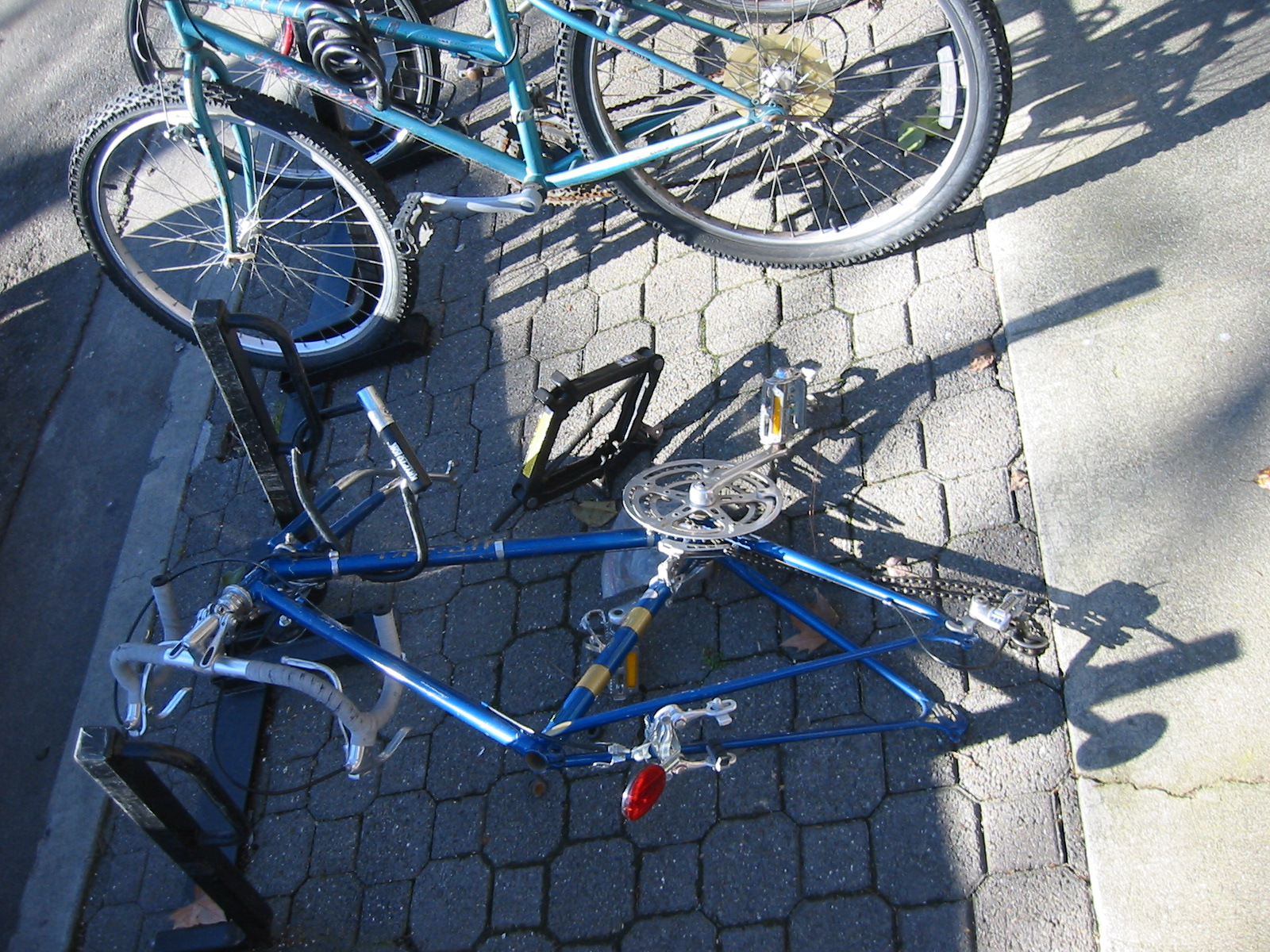
An attempted bicycle theft in Davis, California where the perpetrator tried to the break the U-lock with a car jack

Bicycle theft is the act

of stealing a bicycle. It is a common crime due to the relative ease of reselling bicycles, which have a large second-hand market. This makes the crime attractive to those needing to obtain currency quickly, such as people with substance addictions. Bicycles are also easily accessible, often being locked up outside in public places in urban areas. Despite the developed market of bicycle locks, it is estimated that millions of bicycles are stolen every year. Thieves use a variety of methods to bypass locks, including taking advantage of bicycle owners' poor locking practices. Bicycle owners can take action to reduce the chances of theft, including utilising facilities such as bicycle lockers and parking racks.

== Rates ==
According to the International Crime Victim Survey (2000), 56% of bicycle thefts across 17 countries were reported to the police.

According to the British Transport Police, theft and bicycle damage has grown 67% between 1999 and 2005, while reported bike thefts in Denmark fell from over 112,000 in 1995 to around 45,000 in 2025, corresponding to a 61% drop.

A 2007 report by the Birmingham Community Safety Partnership in Birmingham, England, found that the majority of bike thieves were males under the age of 20. According to a bicycle theft study in Ellensburg, Washington, approximately 80% of stolen bicycles are stolen for enjoyment or transportation services.

The London Cycle Theft Survey (2016), by Stolen Ride and London Cycling Campaign, 55% reported being 'very concerned' with the security of their bikes out and about in London.

The FBI publishes the percentage of bikes reported stolen each year in their yearly edition of Crime in the United States which is available on the FBI's website, www.fbi.gov. In 2019, bicycles represented 3.1% of larceny-theft reported, second only to motor vehicles.

It is estimated that between 2.5 and 3 million bicycles are stolen in Europe every year. There were 88,307 reports of bicycle theft in England and Wales in 2019/20. The Danish estimate for annual rate of theft of a bike is around 1% in 2025.

== Types of offenders ==
Although many bicycle thefts occur by offenders looking for financial gain, other offenders can be categorized into the following categories regarding their motivation.

- Joyriders: Joyriders steal bikes for the sole purpose of riding the stolen bike for entertainment and will generally abandon the bike after using it. Most of these offenders are male and under the age of 16.
- Acquisitive: These thieves steal bicycles for financial gain and usually trade them for cash or goods. The bikes may also be sold in pieces for drugs or money. Bicycle theft, like many other property crimes, is often driven by drug addiction.

== Perpetrator techniques ==
There are a variety of methods of stealing bikes.

Lifting
If the bike is locked to an insecure structure such as a small sign or tree, the thief is able to lift the bike along with its lock off the structure.
Cutting
A thief may use a bolt cutter, hacksaw, or angle grinder to cut through the bicycle lock.
Picking
A thief may pick a lock that has a keyhole.
Sucker pole
A sucker pole is an item of street furniture that appears to be safe to lock a bike to, but can easily be dismantled by bicycle thieves to remove the lock without opening it. A sucker pole may be a sign, fence, bike rack or other feature. In Chicago, 252 bicycles were stolen in this manner in 2012.
Lock jamming
KGW news in Portland reported according to local experts they'd interviewed, thieves would jam foreign objects into a victim's lock to prevent their key from working and go strip the bike of components while it is left unattended while the owner tries to figure out how to get it unjammed.

== Prevention ==
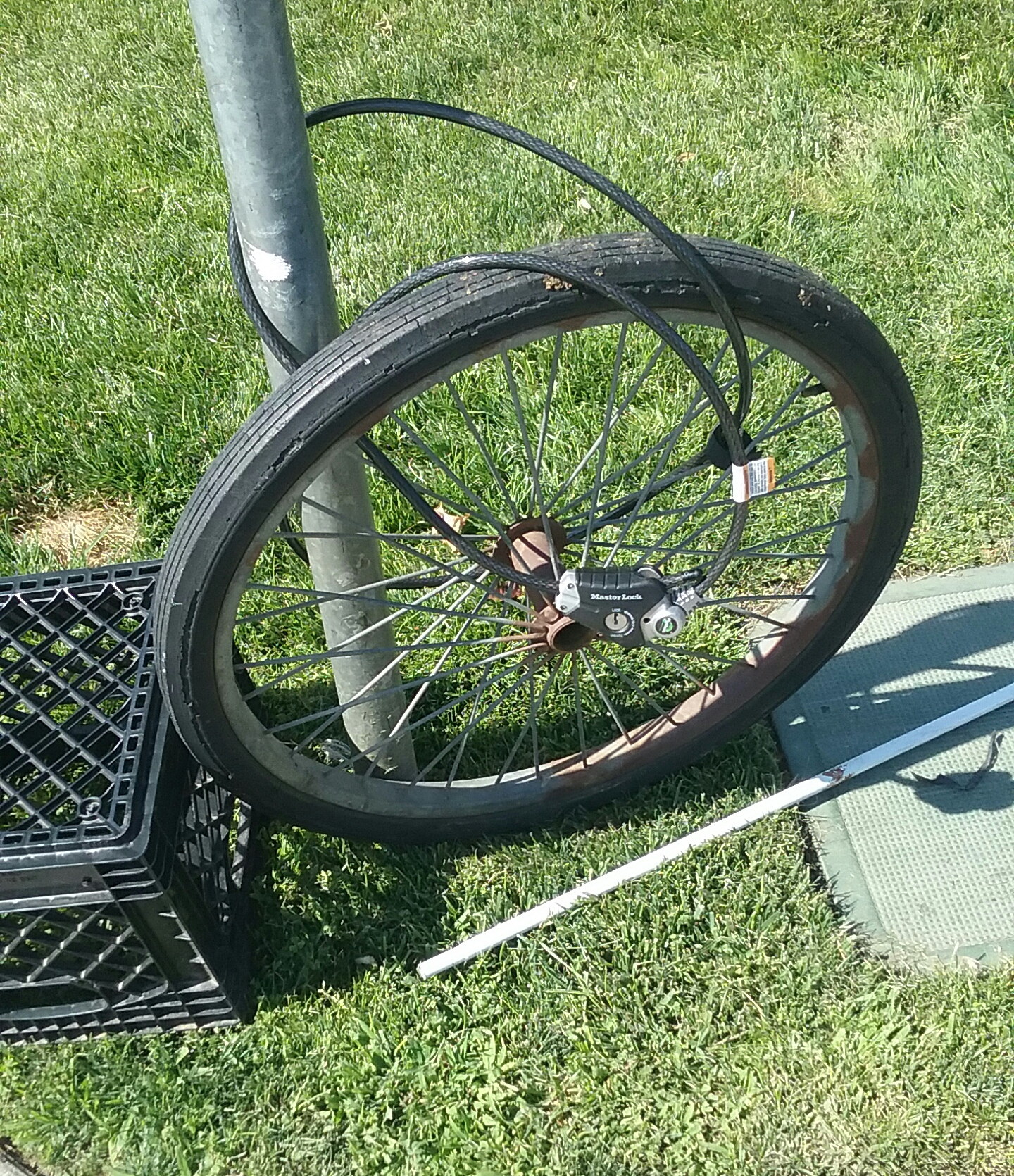
A single bicycle wheel remains locked to a pole of a stop sign at River Park Shopping Center's parking lot in Fresno, California, after the bike has apparently been unbolted from the wheel and carried away.

Bicycle theft is a common crime committed in areas with high population as well as on college campuses. According to the Police Department at the University of Colorado, Boulder, it was found that most bicycle thefts involved bikes being unlocked, improperly locked, or locked with devices such as a lightweight cable or low-quality U-lock devices.

One can prevent bicycle theft by avoiding using bicycles with quick release wheels, as these are easy for anyone to take off without the use of any tools. Furthermore, one should use a strong U-lock to secure the bike, lock the bike to sturdy structures, and not leave the bike in one place for too long.

The way in which the bike is locked to the structure is also important. It is important that both a wheel and the frame of the bike be locked to a structure so that a thief cannot steal a wheel and leave the bike, or vice versa. A former London bike thief recommended small and stiff d-locks, as they are hardest to cut.

A study published in 2012 in PLOS One examined the watching-eye effect as it applied to bicycle theft. The researchers simply placed clearly visible signage saying "Cycle Thieves: We Are Watching You" (along with the words "Operation Crackdown" and the logo of local police) at locations on a university campus in England that had frequently seen bicycle theft. The study found that in the year following the signage's installation, bike thefts decreased by 62% in the locations with the signs, "but increased by 65% in the control locations, suggesting that the signs were effective, but displaced offending to locations with no signs."

Bicycle parking stations can provide added security against bike theft such as by having on-site security staff, CCTV and doors and gates that require a key, pin code or proximity card to open.

== See also ==
- List of bicycle registers
- Bicycle locker
- Bicycle parking rack
