= Cycle sport =

Competitive physical activity using bicycles

Pictogram for Cycling at the Summer Olympics

Cycle sport is a competitive physical activity using bicycles. There are several categories of bicycle racing including road bicycle racing, cyclo-cross, mountain bike racing, track cycling, BMX, and cycle speedway. Non-racing cycling sports include artistic cycling, cycle polo, freestyle BMX, mountain bike trials, hardcourt bike polo and cycleball. The Union Cycliste Internationale (UCI) is the world governing body for cycling and international competitive cycling events. The International Human Powered Vehicle Association is the governing body for human-powered vehicles that imposes far fewer restrictions on their design than does the UCI. The UltraMarathon Cycling Association is the governing body for many ultra-distance cycling races.

Bicycle racing is recognised as an Olympic sport. Bicycle races are popular all over the world, especially in Europe. The countries most devoted to bicycle racing include Belgium, Denmark, France, Germany, Italy, the Netherlands, Spain and Switzerland. Other countries with international standing include Australia, Luxembourg, Slovenia, United Kingdom, United States and Colombia.

== History ==
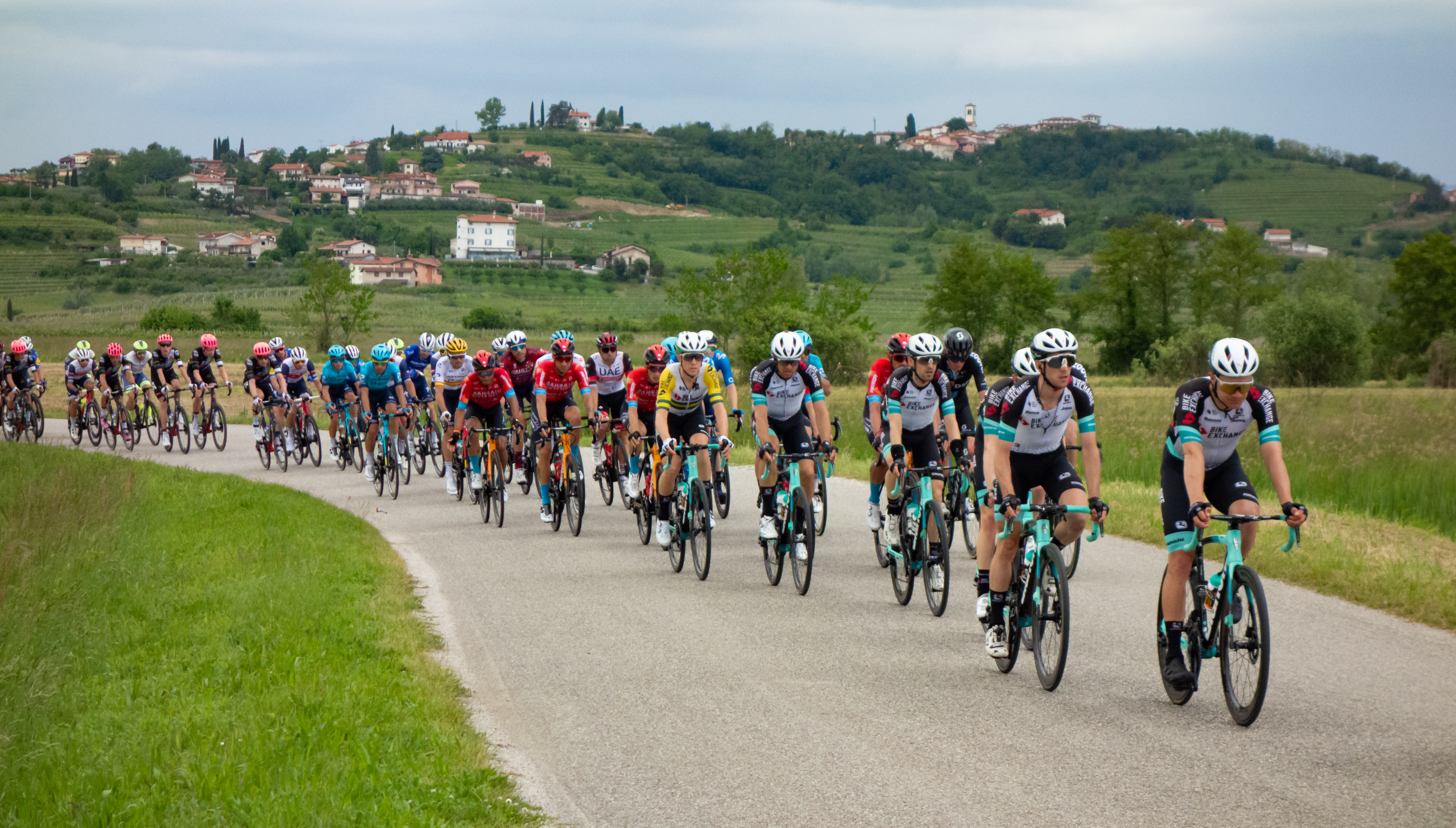
Cyclists in the 2021 Giro d'Italia race

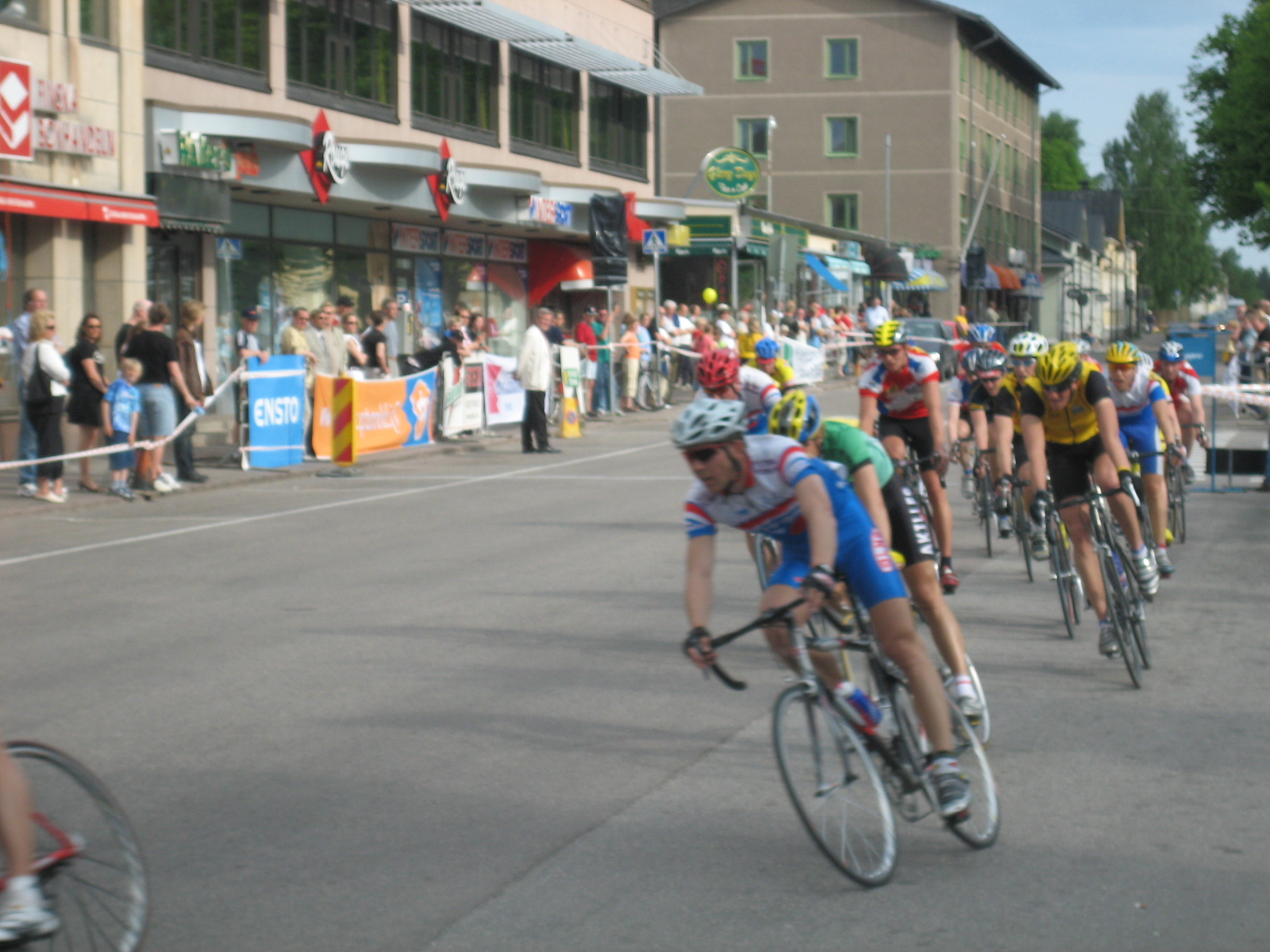
OP Grand Prix, a one-hour cycling competition in Porvoo, Finland, on 11 June 2005

The first bicycle race is popularly held to have been a 1,200 m (3,900 ft) race on May 31, 1868 at the Parc de Saint-Cloud, Paris, France. It was won by expatriate Englishman James Moore, who rode a wooden bicycle with solid rubber tires. The machine is now on display at the museum in Ely, Cambridgeshire, England.

The Union Cycliste Internationale was founded on 14 April 1900 by Belgium, the United States, France, Italy, and Switzerland to replace the International Cycling Association, which had been formed in 1892, over a row with Great Britain as well as because of other issues.

Since the rise of the Olympic Movement at the 1896 Summer Olympics, cycling has been a contestant event in every Summer Olympic Games.

== Racing ==
=== Road bicycle ===
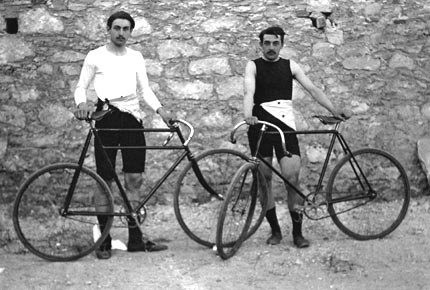
Cycle-racing has a long history: French cyclists Léon Flameng and Paul Masson at the 1896 Summer Olympics.

Road bicycle racing involves both team and individual competition, and races are contested in various ways. They range from the one-day road race, criterium, and time trial to multi-stage events like the Tour de France and its sister events which make up cycling's Grand Tours.

The races typically take place from spring through to autumn. Many riders from the Northern Hemisphere spend the winter in countries such as Australia to compete or train. Professional races range from the three-week "Grand Tour" stage races such as the Tour de France, Giro d'Italia and the Vuelta a España to multi-day stage races such as the Tour de Suisse and Tour of California, to single day "Classics" such as the Tour of Flanders and Milan–San Remo. The longest one-day road race sanctioned by USA Cycling is LOTOJA, which covers the 206 mi (332 km) from Logan, Utah, to Jackson, Wyoming. Criteriums are races based on circuits typically less than a mile in length and sometimes run for a set time (60 min, 90 min, etc.) rather than a specific distance. Criteriums are the most popular form of road racing in North America. In Belgium, kermesses are popular, single-day events of usually over 120 km (70 mi). As well as road races in which all riders start simultaneously, individual time trial and team time trial events are also held on road-based courses.

=== Track cycling ===
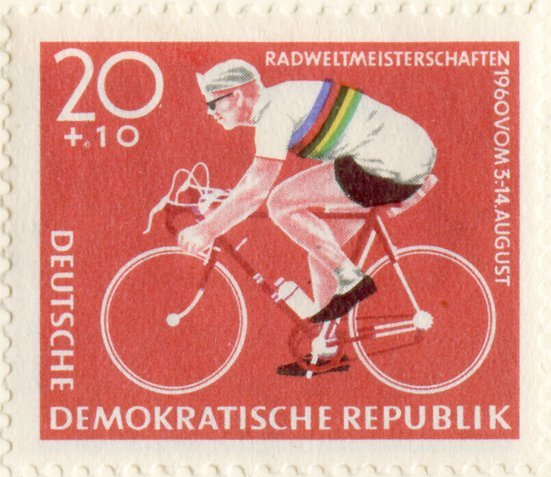
In many European countries, bicycle racing is a source of national pride: German Democratic Republic postage stamp depicting Täve Schur, 1960

Track cycling has been around since as early as 1870. The riders competed on wooden indoor tracks that closely resembled the modern velodromes of today. Unlike road racing, which is dependent on environmental factors, indoor tracks ensure the sport can be competed all year round.

It encompasses races that take place on banked tracks or velodromes. Events are quite diverse and can range from individual and team pursuits, two-man sprints, to various group and mass start races. Competitors use track bicycles which do not have brakes or freewheels.

=== Cyclo-cross ===
Cyclo-cross originated as a sport for road racers during the off-season, to diversify their training during the cold months. Races typically take place in the autumn and winter (the international or World Cup season is September–January) and consist of many laps of a 2–3 km (1–2 mi) course featuring pavement, wooded trails, grass, steep hills, and obstacles requiring the rider to dismount, carry the bike and remount in one motion. Races for senior categories are generally between 30 minutes and an hour long, the distance varying depending on the conditions. The sport is strongest in traditional road cycling countries such as Belgium (Flanders in particular) and France.

=== Mountain bike ===
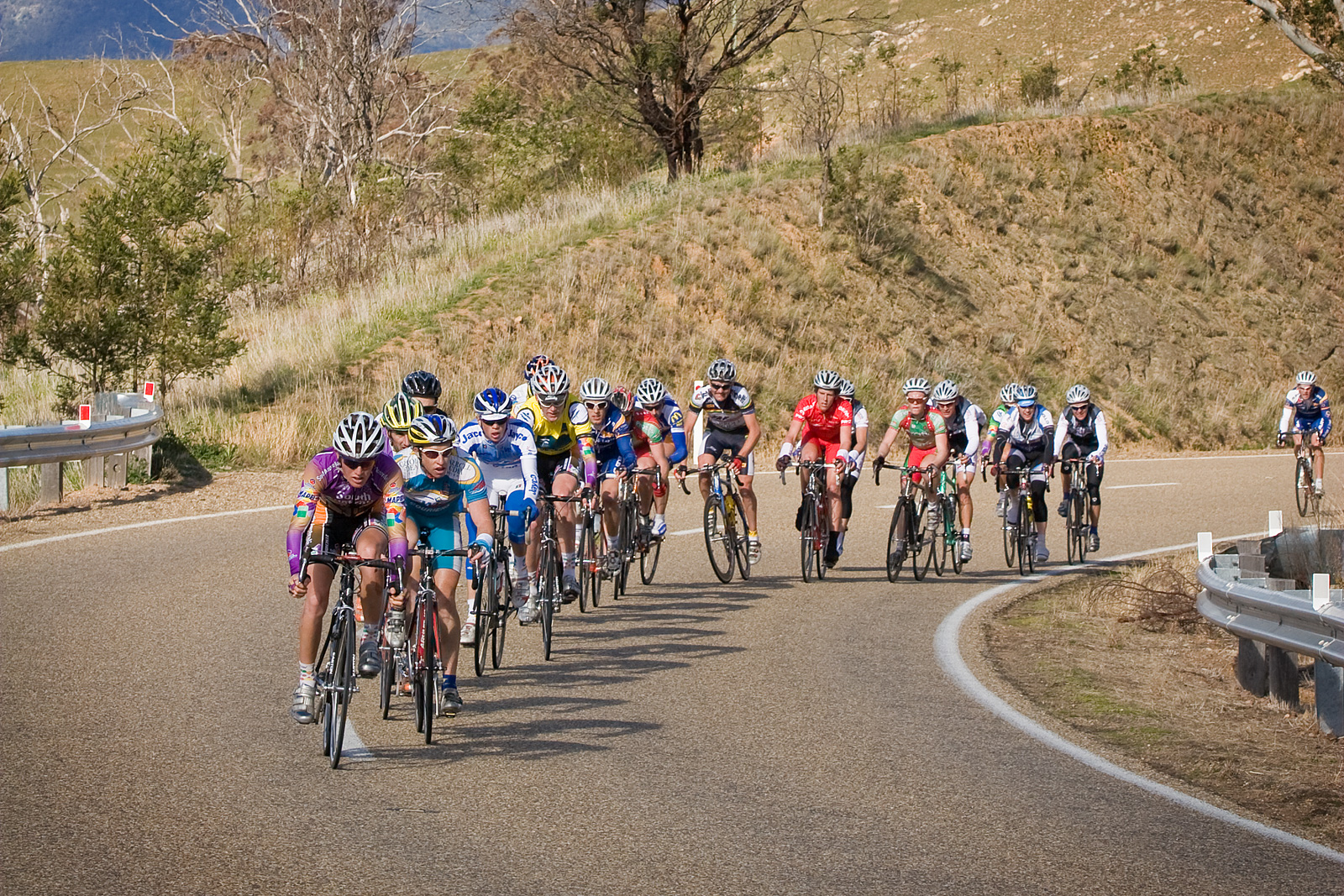
The final stage in Australia's Tour of Gippsland climbing up "The Gap" to Omeo

Mountain bike races are held off-road and involve moderate to high degree of technical riding. There are several varieties; the main categories are cross-country, enduro and downhill but also 4X or four-cross racing.

=== BMX ===
BMX takes place off-road. BMX races are sprints on purpose-built off-road single-lap tracks, typically on single-gear bicycles. Riders navigate a dirt course of jumps and banked and flat corners.

=== Cycle speedway ===
Cycle speedway is bicycle racing on short outdoor dirt tracks, 70–90 m (230–300 ft) in length.

=== Motor-paced racing ===
Motor-paced racing and keirin use motorcycles for pacing, so cyclists achieve higher speeds.

=== Gravel racing ===
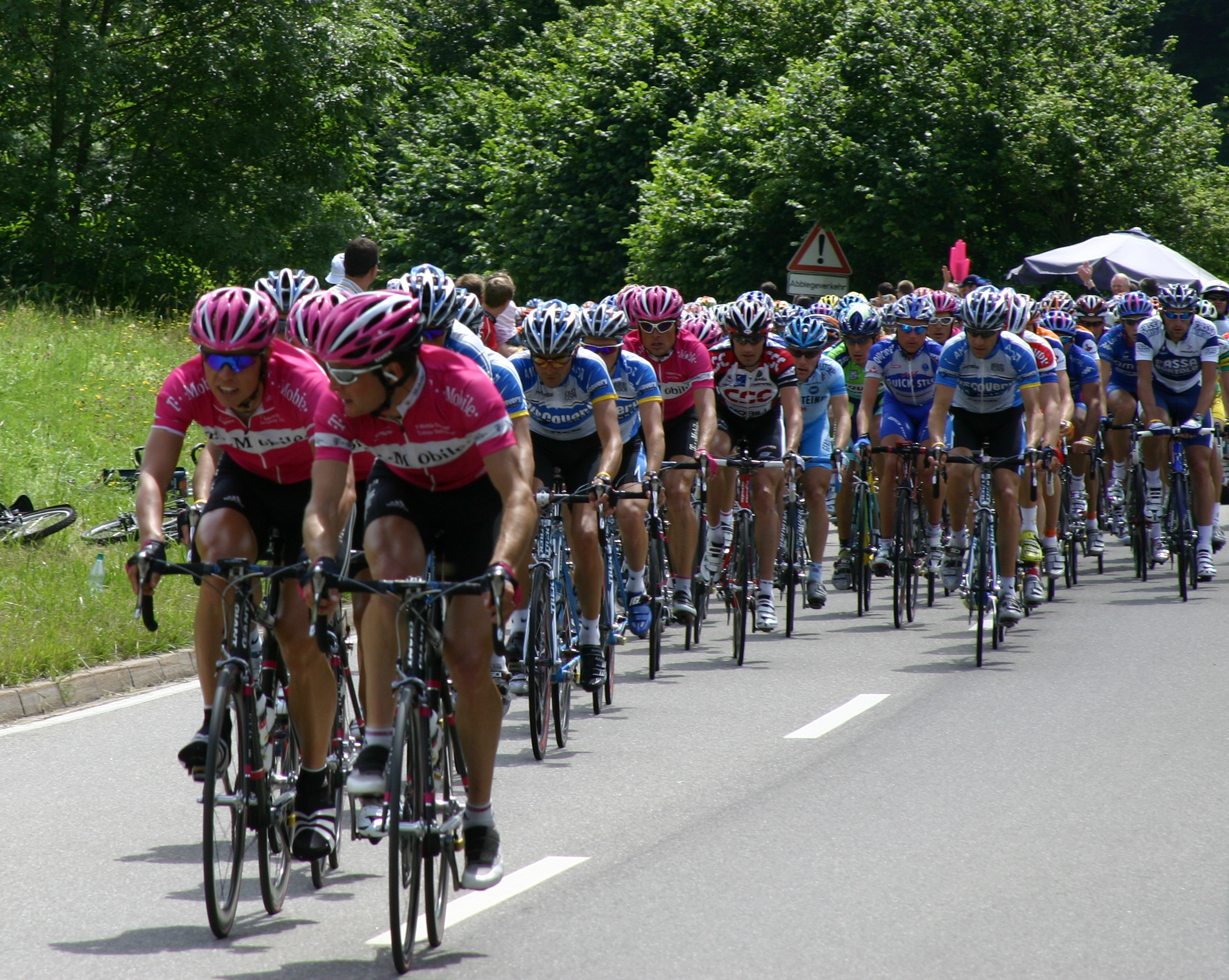
The peloton of the Tour de France

Gravel racing is one of the newest disciplines of bicycle racing, emerging in the 21st century. For example, one of the premiere gravel races, Unbound Gravel, started in 2006. Some precursors to gravel racing in its current form include road races like the Tour of the Battenkill and Boulder–Roubaix (named after Paris–Roubaix) which are road races with gravel sections. The distinguishing features of gravel racing include long distances, often 100 to 200 mi (160 to 320 km), and mass starts that include all categories of racers, similar to Gran Fondo rides. The bicycles and courses in gravel racing vary widely, from road bicycles with wide tires used on smooth gravel roads to bicycles that are similar to mountain bike used on courses that include technical trails.

=== Average speeds ===
Speeds achieved on indoor tracks are usually greater than those on roads. Other factors affecting speed are the route profile (flats and hills), wind conditions, temperatures and elevation. At a 2013 event in Mexico, François Pervis achieved an average of 21.40 metres per second (77.0 km/h; 47.9 mph) with a flying start over 200 m (660 ft). The top average speed over the men's 1 km (0.6 mi) time trial at the 2004 Summer Olympics was 16.4 metres per second (59 km/h; 37 mph) recorded by Chris Hoy. Average speeds clearly drop with increasing distance, so that over the 120 km (70 mi) Cootamundra Annual Classic it is 11.8 metres per second (42 km/h; 26 mph). In the 259 km (200 mi) 2010 Paris–Roubaix, Fabian Cancellara set a speed of 10.9 metres per second (39 km/h; 24 mph), while over the 818 km (500 mi) Furnace Creek 508, the speed drops dramatically to 8.3 metres per second (30 km/h; 19 mph). For an extreme road distance such as the 4,800 km (3,000 mi) Race Across America, the average speed of the record holder is 5.7 metres per second (21 km/h; 13 mph), while the 2,350 km (1,000 mi) Freedom Trail over mountainous terrain in South Africa is at a record speed of 1.9 metres per second (6.8 km/h; 4.3 mph).

=== Mountain bike trials ===
Mountain bike trials is a sport where riders navigate natural and human-made obstacles without putting down their foot, or "dabbing". It is similar to motorcycle trials. Points are awarded for bike handling skills. The first UCI Trials World Championships took place in 1986.

== Non-racing disciplines ==
=== Freestyle BMX ===
Freestyle BMX is an extreme sport of stunt riding BMX bikes.

=== Artistic cycling ===
Artistic cycling is a discipline where athletes perform tricks (called exercises) in a format similar to ballet or gymnastics.

=== Cycle ball ===
Cycle ball, also known as "radball" (from German), is a sport similar to association football played on bicycles. The two people on each team ride a fixed gear bicycle with no brakes or freewheel. The ball is controlled by the bike and the head, except when defending the goal.

=== Cycle Polo ===
Cycle Polo is a team sport that combines elements of traditional horse polo with bicycling and is played on grass. Cycle Polo's was included in the 1908 London Olympics as a demonstration sport. The game has become particularly popular in India.

==== Hardcourt Bike Polo ====
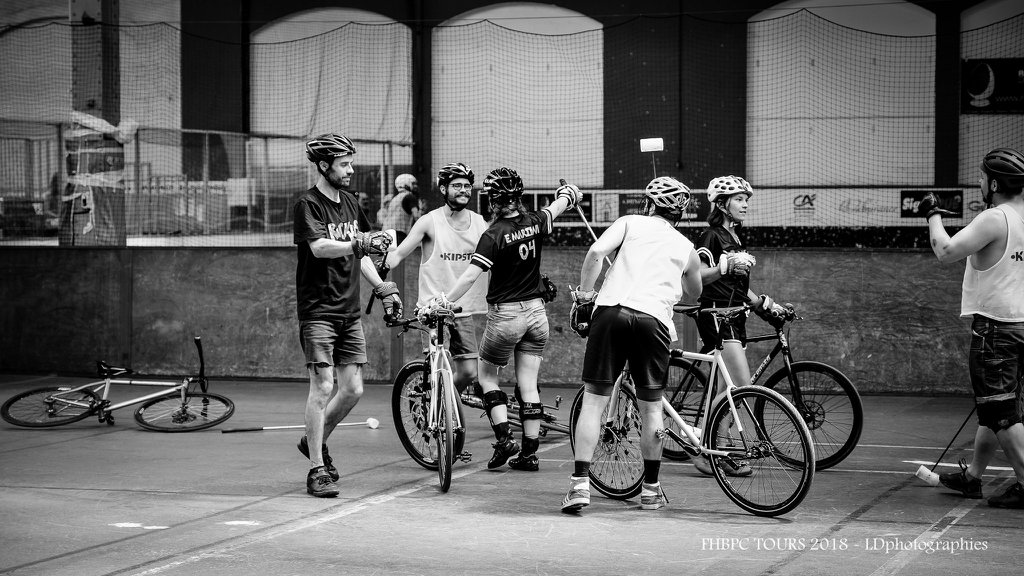
After a Hardcourt Bike tournament

Hardcourt Bike Polo is a more popular, fast-paced, and physically demanding variation of Cycle Polo played on hard surfaces such as asphalt or concrete. In teams of three, players maneuver their bicycles while using mallets to strike a ball into the opposing team's goal. Originating in Seattle in the late 1990s, hardcourt bike polo has since gained a sharp spike in popularity worldwide, with organized leagues and tournaments held in urban centers across the globe.

== See also ==
- 2018 European Cycling Championships
- Alleycat races
- Cycling
- The Cyclists' Alliance
- Dirt jumping
- Downhill mountain biking
- Freestyle BMX
- Glossary of cycling
- Hardcourt Bike Polo
- History of cycling
- List of doping cases in cycling
- List of racing cyclists and pacemakers with a cycling-related death
- Mountain bike trials
- Mountain biking
- Outline of cycling
