= Ecmc =

ECMC may refer to:

- Erie County Medical Center, a hospital located in Buffalo, New York
- European Cycle Messenger Championships
- Educational Credit Management Corporation
