= Segway polo =

Team sport played on Segways

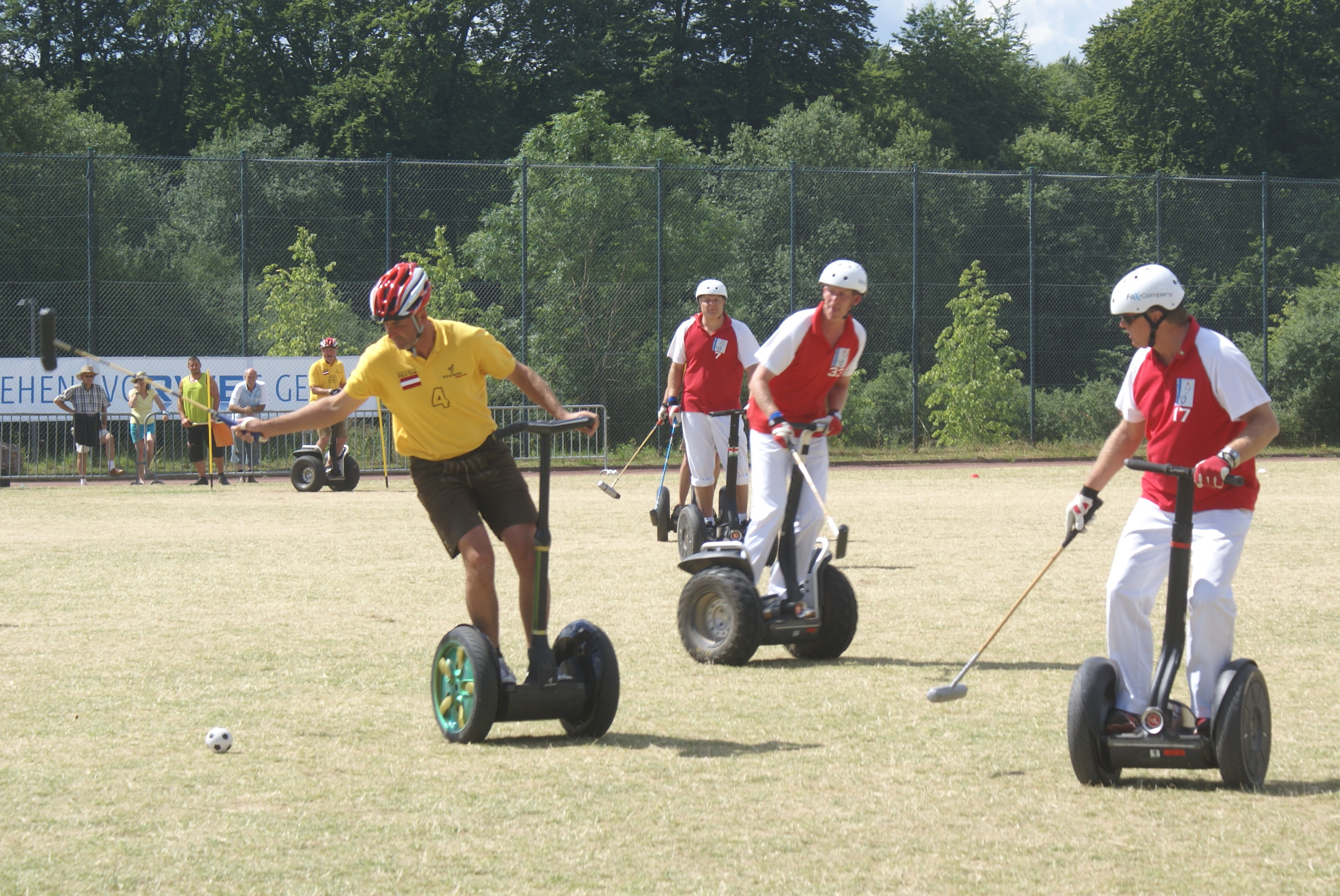
European Segway Polo Championship 2010 in Hemer

Segway polo is a team sport which started to gain some measure of popularity after being played by members of the Bay Area Segway Enthusiasts Group (Bay Area SEG) in 2004. The Bay Area SEG was not the first to play polo on a Segway HT; a team sponsored by Mobile Entertainment played in the Hubert H. Humphrey Metrodome at a Minnesota Vikings halftime show in 2003 although the Bay Area SEG members were not aware of this match at the time they first played the sport. Segway polo was developed by the members of the Bay Area SEG and other groups and teams that joined subsequently.

== History ==
Segway polo is similar to horse polo, except that instead of playing on horseback, each player rides a Segway PT on the field. The rules have been adapted from bicycle polo and horse polo. Two teams of five players each hit a ball with their mallets, trying to get the ball into the other team's goal. The regulation field size is 200 by 128 feet (61 by 39 meters), and the goal is 8 feet (2.4 meters) wide by 5 feet (1.5 meters) high. A regulation match consists of four 8 minute quarters, known in polo as "chukkers." The ball can be struck with the mallet or any part of a player's body or Segway but may only be directed using the mallet. A goal can not be scored off of any part of a player's body or Segway unless it occurs accidentally. First played in 2003.

Although not a major sport, Segway polo gained popularity and teams formed in the United States, Germany, Sweden, Austria, Barbados, Lebanon, the United Kingdom, the Netherlands and Spain among others. The International Segway Polo Association (ISPA) was established as the official governing body for Segway polo.

== Woz Cup ==
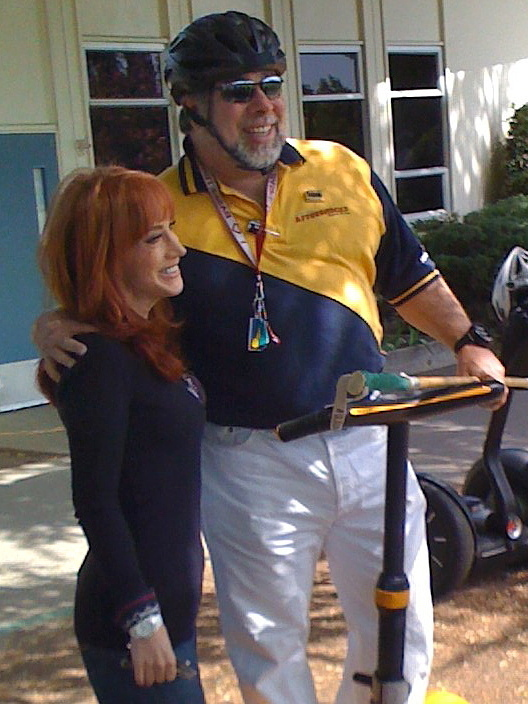
Steve Wozniak with then-girlfriend Kathy Griffin at an April 2008 Segway polo match

The Segway polo world championship is the Woz Challenge Cup. It is named after Steve "Woz" Wozniak, cofounder of Apple Inc., and a player of Segway polo.

The Woz Cup was established in 2006 when the Silicon Valley Aftershocks played the New Zealand Pole Blacks in Auckland, New Zealand. The result was a 2–2 tie.

In 2007, it was played in San Francisco, California, with the Aftershocks defeating the Pole Blacks 5–0.

The 2008 Woz Cup was played in Indianapolis, coincident with Segway fest 2008. The California Gold Rush defeated the Silicon Valley Aftershocks for the championship by a score of 3–2. The Funky-Move Turtles (Germany) placed third and the Polo Bears (California) placed fourth.

The 2009 Woz Cup was played in Cologne, Germany. The Flyin' Fish from Barbados took first place, beating the Silicon Valley Aftershocks 2–0. Steve Wozniak was there to play and present the cup; Victor Miller, who wrote the script for Friday the 13th, was also on the Aftershocks team. The Flyin' Fish have been playing Segway polo for only four months and dominated the other teams hailing from the United States, Germany and Austria.

The 2010 Woz Cup was played at the Lion Castle Polo Estate in Barbados. Once again, the Barbados Flyin' Fish won, this time beating the Germany Blade Pirates 3–1. A total of eight teams participated, including two teams from Barbados, two teams from Germany, one team from Sweden and three teams from California.

The 2011 Woz Cup was hosted by the Folsom Breakout and played in Folsom, California from June 16 to 19, 2011. There were a record 12 teams competing. The Germany Blade Pirates avenged their previous year's loss against the Flyin' Fish and beat them in the championship match by a score of 1–0. The Swiss Tournament rules was applied.

The 2012 Woz Cup was hosted in Stockholm, Sweden by Stockholm Segway Polo Club. It was played with 14 teams participating from 9 nations.

The Balver Mammuts won over The Blade Pirates in the final with 2–0. The Stockholm Saints, Sweden, beat the Austrian team Vineyard Devils with 4–0 for the bronze match. The goal zone rule was introduced in Woz Cup for the first time. The games were held during June 6–10 at Östermalms IP and Zinkensdamm in central Stockholm. Moving from one arena to the other after group play, the caravan of Segways was 102 Segways through central Stockholm. Finland and Lebanon were among the new national teams joining for the first time.

The 2013 Woz Cup was held at the Hotchkiss field at Gallaudet University, Washington, D.C., from July 20 to 24th. 9 teams from 5 nations participated. The competition was hosted by the Lebanon Cedars. The Stockholm Saints (Sweden) won over Team Barbados in the final with 2–1. In the bronze medal match, the Blade Allstars from Germany beat the Balver Mammuts (also from Germany) on penalties.

There was no Woz Cup in 2014.

The 2015 Woz Cup was played in Cologne, Germany from July 16 to 19, 2015. A record number of 19 teams from 9 countries participated. Once again, the team captained by Nevin Roach from Barbados took first place, beating the Balver Mammuts (Germany) 1–0. In the bronze medal match, the Stockholm Saints (Sweden) beat the Blade Pirates (also from Germany) 2–0. Steve Wozniak was there to play for the Silicon Valley Aftershocks.

There was no Woz Cup in 2016.

The 2017 Woz Cup was played at the Overhoff Arena in Hemer, Germany from July 27 until July 30, 2017. 18 teams from 7 countries participated. Once again, the team from Barbados took first place, beating the Balver Mammuts (Germany) 3–1. In the bronze medal match, the Stockholm Saints (Sweden) beat the Blade Pirates (also from Germany) 2–0.

There was no Woz Cup in 2018.

The 2019 Woz Cup was played at the Zinkensdamm Arena in Stockholm, Sweden from July 25 until July 28, 2019. 12 teams from 5 countries participated. Once again, the team captained by Nevin from Barbados took first place, beating the Balver Mammuts (Germany) 3–0. In the bronze medal match, the Stockholm Saints (Sweden) beat the Hemer Butterflies (also from Germany) 3–1.

=== Woz Cup venues ===
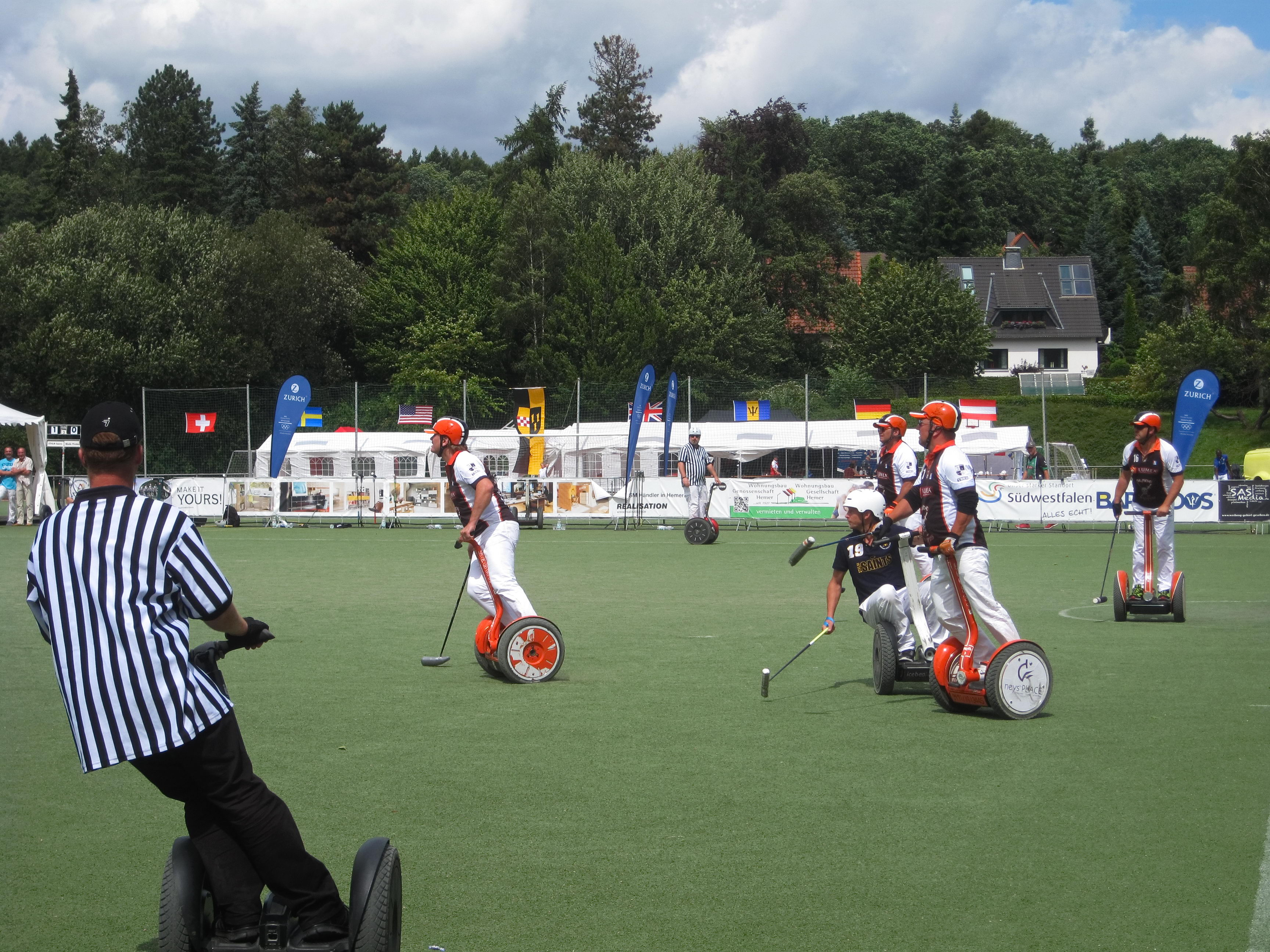
2017 Woz Cup in Hemer

- 2006 – New Zealand (Auckland)
- 2007 – United States (California)
- 2008 – United States (Indianapolis)
- 2009 – Germany (Cologne)
- 2010 – Barbados (Bridgetown)
- 2011 – United States (Folsom, California)
- 2012 – Sweden (Stockholm)
- 2013 – United States (Washington, D.C.)
- 2014 – not held
- 2015 – Germany (Cologne)
- 2016 – not held
- 2017 – Germany (Hemer)
- 2018 – not held
- 2019 – Sweden (Stockholm)

== Known teams ==
Team	Place/Country	Note
Aftershocks	Silicon Valley, United States	Original Segway polo players and creators of Woz Challenge Cup. Tied in first Woz Cup, 2006, and 2007 Woz Cup winner.
Junkyard Dogs	Oakland, United States	
Folsom Breakout	California, United States	
The Originals	California, United States	
Polo Bears	California, United States	
Pole Blacks	New Zealand	Original challengers for newly created Woz Challenge Cup in 2006
Segway Polo Club of Barbados	Barbados	Club has several teams (see below)
Flyin' Fish 2009–2011	Barbados	Winners Woz Cup 2009 and 2010, Runners Up 2011
Rum Runners 2010–2011	Barbados	4th Woz Cup 2010
Team Barbados 2013–	Barbados	Runners Up Woz Cup 2013, Winners Woz Cup 2015, Winners Woz Cup 2017, Winners Woz Cup 2019
Funky-Move Turtles	Germany	3rd place Woz Cup 2009, 2010
Blade Pirates	Solingen, Germany	Runners Up Woz Cup 2010, Winners Woz Cup 2011, Runners Up Woz Cup 2012,
Blade Dragons	Solingen, Germany	8th Woz Cup 2015
Blade Gliders	Solingen, Germany	4th place EM 2011
Balver Mammuts	Balve, Germany	Winner EM 2011, Winner German Masters 2012, Winner Woz Cup 2012, Runners Up Woz Cup 2015
Balver Cavemen	Balve, Germany	7th Woz Cup 2015
Swiss HT-Polo	Switzerland	
Austrian National Team	Austria	4th Woz Cup 2009, 3rd place 2011
Vineyard Devils	Austria	4th Woz Cup 2012, 10th Woz Cup 2015
Stockholm Saints/former Sweden National Team 2009–2011	Sweden	5th Woz Cup 2010, 4th Woz Cup 2011, 6th EM 2011, 3rd Woz Cup 2012, Winners Woz Cup 2013, 3rd Woz Cup 2015
Stockholm Blue Saints	Sweden	
Stockholm Vikings	Sweden	15th Woz Cup 2015
Lebanon National Team	Beirut, Lebanon	5th Woz Cup 2015
Finland National Team	Finland	
Hemer Butterflies	Hemer, Germany	4th Woz Cup 2009
Team GB (UK Segway polo)	Rugby, United Kingdom	13th Woz Cup 2015
Team England	United Kingdom	16th Woz Cup 2015
Lichfield Lions	Lichfield, United Kingdom	Warwick Winter Tournament 2015
Warwick Allstars	Warwick, United Kingdom	Warwick Winter Tournament 2015
Warwick Knights	Warwick, United Kingdom	Warwick Winter Tournament 2015
The Famous Five	Tring, United Kingdom	Warwick Winter Tournament 2015
The Puds	Tring, United Kingdom	Warwick Winter Tournament 2015
Warwick Bears	Warwick, United Kingdom	Europa – Klingen – Zurich Cup 2015
Cornwall Segway Polo Team	Cornwall, United Kingdom	9th place in Woz Cup 2015 (2015 UK Champions)
Segway Trip Polo	Madrid, Spain	17th place in Woz Cup 2015
Hannover Hot Wheels	Hannover, Germany	18th place in Woz Cup 2015

== Other tournaments ==
- The first Open European Polo Championship was held 16–18 July 2010 in Hemer (Germany)
- The second Open European Polo Championship was held 30 September – 2 October 2011 in Berchtesgaden/ Königsee (Germany) 1st Balver Mammuts
- The first Open German Polo Championship was held 19–20 May 2012 in (Germany)
- The third Open European Polo Championship was held 3–7 October 2012 in Balve (Germany) 1st Balver Mammuts
- The fourth Open European Championship was held 3–5 October 2013 in Hennef (Germany) 1st Balver Mammuts, 2nd Team Barbados,
- The fifth Open European Championship was held 3–5 October 2014 in Hennef (Germany) 1st Balver Mammuts, 2nd Blade Pirates, 3rd Funky Move Turtles, 4th Balver Cavemen
- The first UK Segway Polo International Tournament was held on 18–19 April 2015 in Rugby (England) 1st Balver Mammuts, 2nd Funky Move Turtles, 3rd Stockholm Saints, 4th Team Barbados
- The second UK Segway tournament was held as the Warwick Winter Tournament 2015, in Warwick (England). 1st Hannover Hotwheels, 2nd Lichfield Lions, 3rd PUDS, 4th Warwick Knights, 5th Warwick Allstars, 6th Famous Five
- The sixth Open European Championship was held 7–9 October 2016 in Denia (Spain) 1st Balver Mammuts, 2nd Team Expendables
- The seventh Open European Championship was held 26–29 July 2018 in Kelmis (Belgium) 1st Balver Mammuts, 2nd Blade Dragons
- The Barbados Cup 2014, 2016, 2018

== See also ==
- Segway Fest
- Steve Wozniak
- Polo
- Cycle polo
