= Cycle polo at the 1908 Summer Olympics =

Cycle polo was featured in the Summer Olympic Games unofficial programme in 1908.

== See also ==
- 1908 Summer Olympics
- Cycle polo
