= Cycle polo =

Team sport originating in Ireland; related to polo but played on bicycles

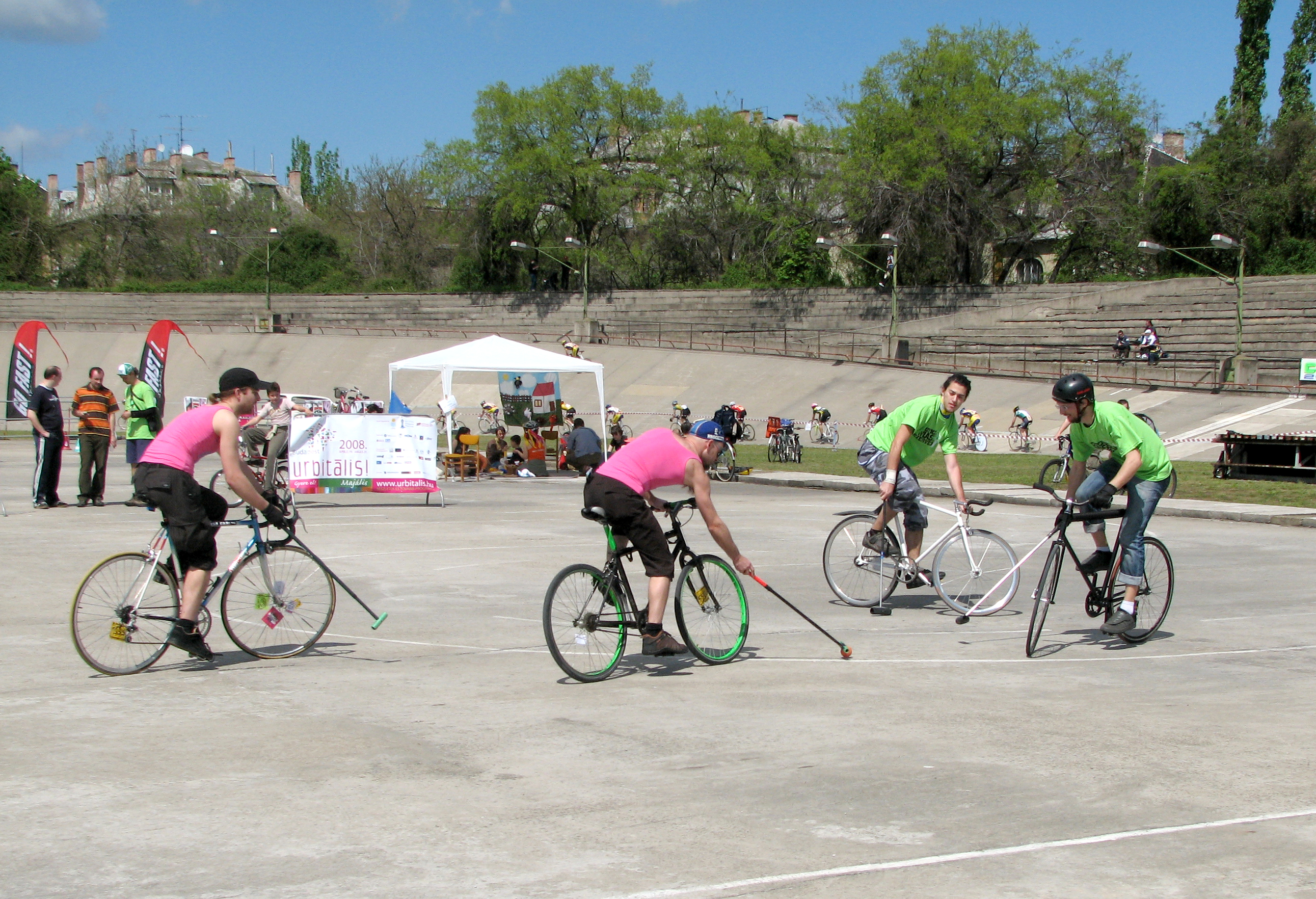
- Bike polo match in Budapest
- Highest governing body: International Bicycle Polo Federation, North American Bike Polo Association, European Hardcourt Bike Polo Association
- First played: October 1891 - County Wicklow, Ireland. (Rathclaren Rovers V Ohne Hast Cycling Club)

Characteristics
- Team members: Three, four, or five, depending on organization
- Type: Team sport
- Equipment: Bicycle, Mallet, Ball

Presence
- Olympic: London, 1908. (Demonstration Game – Ireland 3-v-1 Germany)

Cycle polo, bicycle polo, or bike polo (polo-vélo in French; Radpolo in German) is a team sport, similar to traditional polo, except that bicycles are used instead of horses. There are two versions of the sport: Hardcourt Bike Polo and grass court bike polo. The hardcourt game saw a sharp spike in interest in the first decade of the 21st century and new teams are sprouting up all across the world.

== History ==
Cycle polo was featured in the Summer Olympic Games unofficial programme in 1908.

Fédération sportive du travail (FST) 1919-1934 in France.

The World Bicycle Polo Federation was founded in 1987 in the USA.

The Cycle Messenger World Championships have been ongoing since 1993, as well as the European Cycle Messenger Championships since 1996.

== The grass game ==
There are two versions of the grass games: the four-player game and the five-player game.

In the four-player game, cycle polo is played in a rectangular grass field, 150 by 100 metres (490 ft × 330 ft) officially, unofficially whatever field is big enough. Moreover, official dimensions can vary between 120 by 150 metres (390 ft × 490 ft) in length on 80 by 100 metres (260 ft × 330 ft) in width. The ball used approximately 2.5 inches (64 mm) in diameter and the mallet is of maximum length 1 metre (3 ft 3 in).

Goals are four metres wide and made with two goal posts without any crossbar.

There are six members in a team, of which four are on field at any one time. The other two are used as substitutes. International matches are played for a duration of 30 minutes, divided into periods of 7.5 minutes known as chukkars. Extra time can be used to determine the winner in the event of the scores being tied at normal time.

A player following the ball on its exact line and taking it on his off side will be entitled to the right of way over all other players.

If a deliberate severe foul is committed at the vicinity of the goal, the team that is fouled is automatically given a goal. Less severe fouls are awarded 15-metre and 25-metre free hits. In the event of deliberate fouls or dangerous fouls, the umpire can issue a yellow card (warning) and in case of repeated or severe fouls a red card (ejection). The ejected player can be replaced by a substitute after the end of the current chukkar if the umpire allows it.

In the 5 player game (mostly used in Europe), bicycle polo is played in a rectangular grass field, 100 by 60 metres (330 ft × 200 ft) officially, such as a football or a rugby field. Moreover, official dimensions can vary between 80–110 metres (260–360 ft) in length and 40–70 metres (130–230 ft) in width. The ball shall be round and may not be less than 32 cm (12.6 inches) or greater than 38 cm (15.0 inches) in circumference when inflated and the mallet is of maximum length 1 metre (3 ft 3 in).

Goals are 4 meters wide (5 meters in the national French rules) and made with 2 goal posts and a 2.75 meter (3 yards) high crossbar.

There are eight members in a team of which five are on the field at any one time, including a goalkeeper. The other three are used as substitutes. Matches are played for a duration of 60 minutes divided into 4 periods of 15 minutes each. Extra time can be used to determine the winner in case the scores are tied at normal time.

In order for a player to touch the ball or attack an opponent, the player must be holding the mallet in his right hand, the handlebar in his left hand, and must not be touching the ground with any part of his body.

In order to attack an opponent who is playing the ball on their right side, a player shall attack the opponent on the right side of the opponent with the ball in the middle of both players (i.e. the ball shall be on the left side of the attacking player).

In order to attack an opponent who is playing the ball on their left side, a player shall attack the opponent on the left side of the opponent with the ball in the middle of both players (i.e. the ball shall be on the right side of the attacking player).

The right of way is given to the player who follows or possesses the ball. In the penalty area, the right of way is lost in favour of the goalkeeper.

== The Hardcourt game ==
Video of cycle polo

Since the 2000's, an evolving form of the game known as "Hardcourt Bike Polo" has grown in popularity. In this co-ed variation, teams composed of three players compete on tennis courts, street hockey rinks, or other hardcourt surfaces. Two official rulesets have been created and vary slightly between the North American and the European governing bodies.

Generally this is a faster game with three members on a team. A street hockey ball is used and matches are played until one team scores five points or time has expired, without playing chukkars. During tournament play, a time limit, such as 15 minutes, may be used to maximise the number of tournament rounds possible during the day.

There are three core rules of play:

In the case of a 'foot down' or 'dab' (touching the ground with one's foot) the player must "tap out" by riding to mid-court and hitting a designated area with their mallet. There is usually a tap-out located on either side of the court.

In order to score, the offensive player must hit the ball across the goal line using the narrow end of the mallet, called a "shot" or "ripper." Hitting the ball across the goal line with the wide end of the mallet is called a "shuffle" resulting is a turnover without.

Some Incidental bike-on-bike contact is allowed, but using your bike to initiate contact with an opponent or their equipment is regulated and may result in a penalty.

The North American Hardcourt Bike Polo Association has created an official ruleset, which has helped standardise rules across the globe.

== History ==
The game was invented in County Wicklow, Ireland, in 1891 by retired champion cyclist Richard J. Mecredy, editor of The Irish Cyclist magazine. In October of that year the first cycle polo match was played at the Scalp (County Wicklow) between Rathclaren Rovers and the Ohne Hast Cycling Club. Towards the end of the 19th century the game reached Great Britain, France, and the United States where the American Star Bicycle was a popular mount. An exhibition match by Hanegan & Hazelton vs. Brady & Murphy, members of "The Original Champion American Bicycle Polo Team", riding Cleveland cycles, was played at the Empire Theatre in London every night during the week of 8 May 1899, claimed in the programme to be the first such exhibition "on any stage". The first international match was played between Ireland and England in 1901. Cycle polo was a demonstration sport at the 1908 London Olympics with Ireland winning, beating Germany.

The sport reached its peak of popularity in Great Britain during the 1930s with the introduction of the regional leagues. Cycle polo also flourished in France during this period with the establishment of the French league. Internationals between France and Great Britain were held regularly. However the Second World War marked the beginning of the demise of cycle polo in Britain. The sport remained in France though, with league championships held regularly until today.

The 1980s saw the rise of two new powers in cycle polo, India and the United States. The Bicycle Polo Association of America was created in 1994. International cycle polo matches staged a comeback in the 1990s with the first world championship organized in 1996 in the USA. Today there is organized cycle polo being played in Brazil, Argentina, Australia, Canada, France, Germany, Great Britain, India, Ireland, Malaysia, New Zealand, Pakistan, South Africa, Sri Lanka, Sweden, Switzerland and USA. Cycle polo was officially recognized by the Union Cycliste Internationale in 2001.

== Cycle Polo in India ==
Durga Das playing cycle polo at the Indian Military Academy

The Cycle Polo Association of India was officially created in 1966 it has its office in Jaipur, Rajasthan. The first men's nationals were played in 1970 in New Delhi, with the team from Rajasthan emerging victorious.

In the 2016–17 season, the men's nationals were held in Jodhpur, Rajasthan from 13 to 16 January 2017. Indian Air Force was the champion and the Indian Army the runners-up. The 2016-17 women's nationals were held at Dundlod, Rajasthan from 21 to 24 February 2017. Chhattisgarh defeated Karnataka in the finals.

The Calcutta Cricket & Football Club hosted the first Merchant's Cup Cycle Polo tournament in 1973. In 2012, the CC&FC had organised a Cycle Polo Legend's Tournament where great players of yesteryear such as Vijai Singh, Lakshman Singh and Bikram Das participated. Currently, the CC&FC plays host to the March Mug, the Swaroop Bhanjdeo Memorial Tournament and the CC&FC Trophy. Since 2015 onwards, CC&FC has been hosting the CC&FC All India Invitation Cycle Polo Cup which is organised jointly by the CC&FC along with the Cycle Polo Association of Bengal.

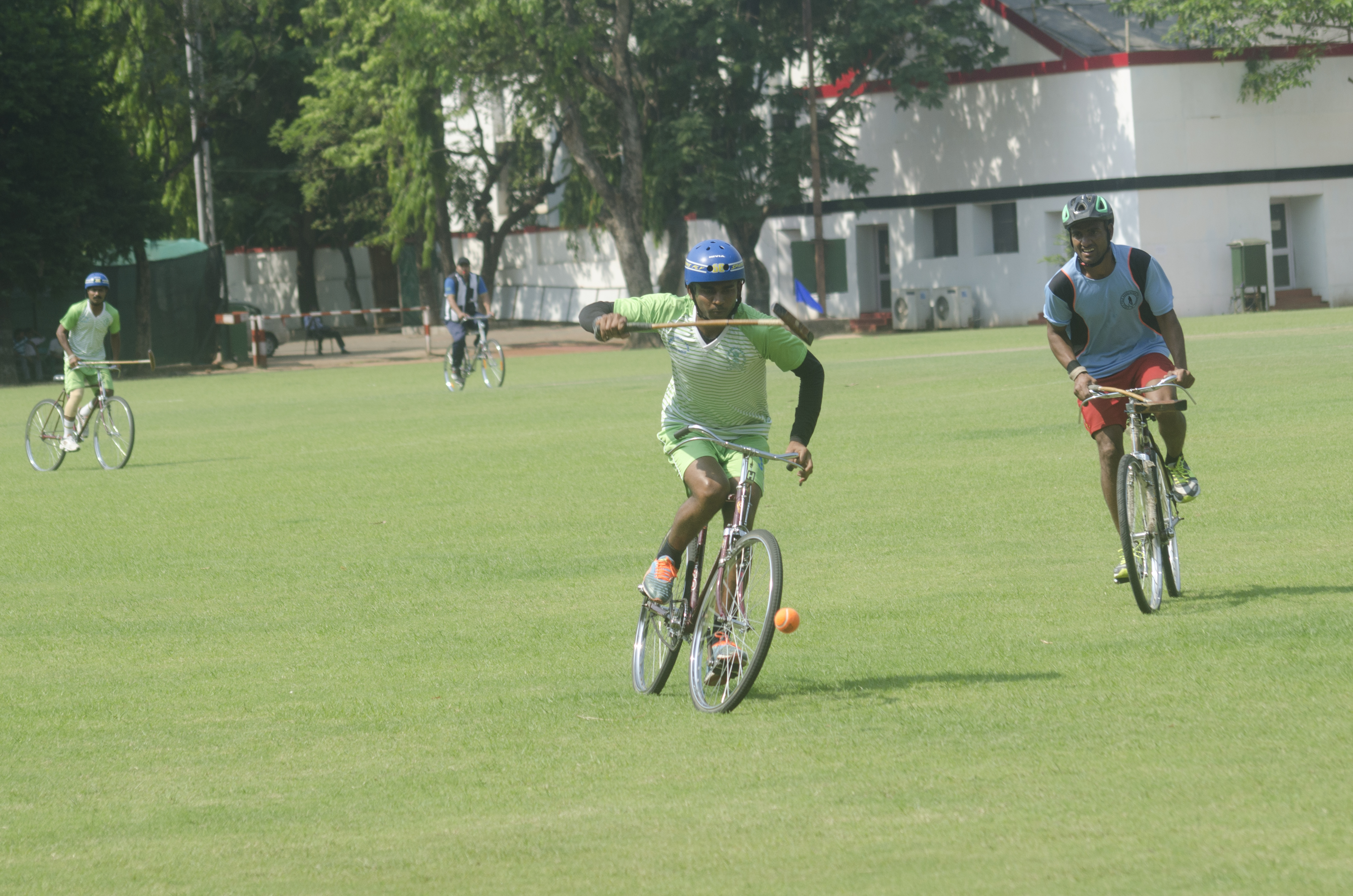
A Traditional Cycle Polo game in CC&FC, Kolkata

In 2017, the CC&FC All India Invitation Cycle Polo Cup had seven teams in the men's section and five in the women's section. Territorial Army were the eventual champions in the men's section. They defeated Indian Air Force 14:6 in the final. In the women section Chhattisgarh defeating in Bengal in the final. 15:3 was the score line.

In 2018, in the men's section, the defending champions Territorial Army successfully defended their title by defeating Bengal 12:10 in the final. In the women's section, Bengal overcame their opponents Uttar Pradesh 15:0 in the final.

== In popular culture ==
- The main titles of the 2011 comedy Portlandia features a man playing the Hardcourt iteration of the sport.
- CSI: NY — a case was solved using spoke cards from a polo tournament; the production crew also filmed at the NYC Bike Polo court.
- Somebody's Gotta Do It — a Mike Rowe segment on bike polo aired in 2015.
- Christian Louboutin opened the 2017 Pitti Uomo fasion shows with a live hardcourt bike polo match in a Florence piazza.

== See also ==
- Cycle ball
- Hardcourt Bike Polo
- Polo
- Segway polo
- fr:Fédération sportive du travail
