= Hardcourt Bike Polo =

Variation of Bicycle Polo

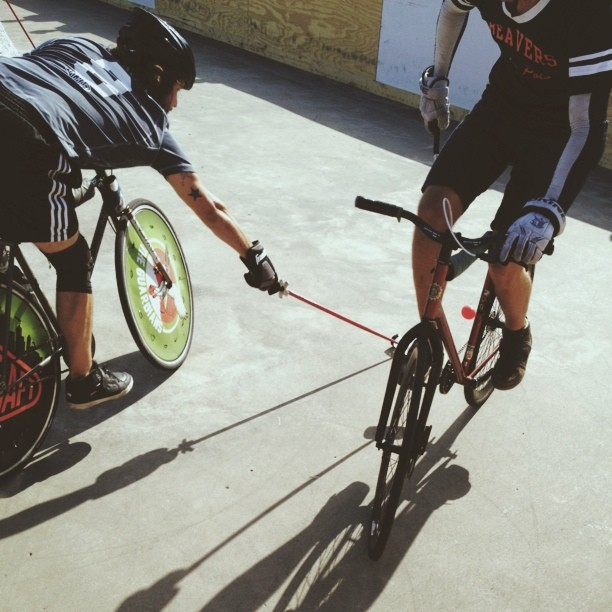
Beavers vs Guardians, NAHBPC 2013

Hardcourt Bike Polo (also called hardcourt, urban polo, bici polo, vélo polo or simply bike polo) is a fast-paced, gender-inclusive team sport played on a hard, smooth, enclosed court with rounded or angled corners. Three players per team ride bicycles and use mallets to hit a small plastic ball into the opposing team's goal while avoiding physical contact with the ground. From its emergence in the 1990s, the sport benefited from the cycling boom of the 2010s, which saw the formation of international clubs and the growth of a strong tournament culture. Following a period of disruption during the 2020 pandemic, hardcourt bike polo experienced a notable resurgence, with new clubs forming in cities where the sport had previously been dormant and participation numbers expanding past pre-pandemic levels by the mid-2020s.

== The game ==
Basics

Typically, the game is played in teams of 3 in an enclosed rectangle with rounded or angled corners, called a "court". Goals are placed near each long end of the court.

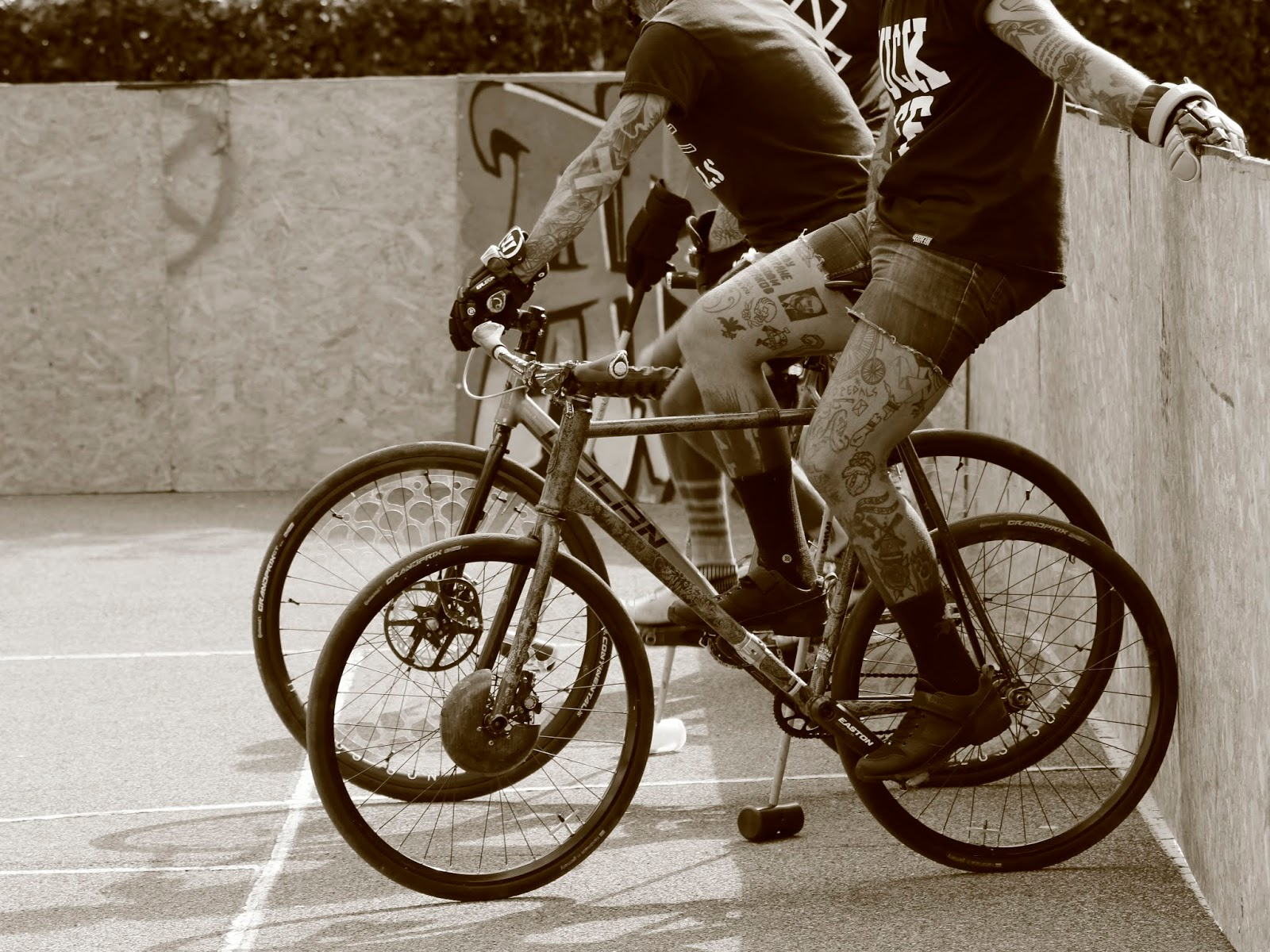
A team lining up on the back wall for the joust

At the beginning of the game, the ball is placed in the middle of the court while the players wait behind their own goals, bikes touching the back wall. Following a countdown or a whistle, a player from each team charges the ball in what is termed the "joust."

A player may hit the ball in two ways: a "shot" or a "shuffle." A shot is made with either end of the mallet head, similar to swinging a hammer, whereas a shuffle is made with the long side, like pushing a broom. In order to score a point, a player must hit the ball into the opposing team's goal with a shot; if the player uses a shuffle, no points are awarded and possession is turned over.

After scoring, the scoring team must return to their own half. The opposing team has ten seconds to advance the ball past half-court in order to resume play. A player who "dabs" (touches a horizontal surface, i.e., putting a foot on the ground or a hand on the wall) must undertake some form of remedial penalty before rejoining play or touching the ball. This usually involves "tapping out," riding to a designated middle point on the court's walls, and touching it with the mallet. It is also common to say "foot down" or "dab" to let other players know you are out of play, but is not required. You should avoid affecting the play of the game at all costs after a foot down occurs.

In a tournament setting, the game continues until a team reaches either a predetermined number of goals (5 is common) or a length of time, depending on the style of play, usually around 10–15 minutes in 3v3. Casual or pick-up games may follow local norms, with the score not typically being kept; these games may end in a golden goal commonly referred to as a "beer point".

"3v3" or teams consisting of three-player teams is the norm. If fewer than six players are available, other games with additional rules like Traitor, Against the world, 2v2, Battleship or Cutthroat are utilized.

As a decentralized and organically growing game, the rules and play styles may vary substantially from city to city and between a pickup game and a tournament final. Controversial rules include mallet-on-mallet hooking, the legendary 'lobster trap', and the legality of physical contact to varying degrees.

The definition and amount of legal contact in a particular game is perhaps the most controversial. One classical definition of legal contact is governed by the saying, "mallet to mallet, bike to bike, shoulder to shoulder, don't be a jerk." "Shoulder to shoulder" refers to a "check", which may be legal if it is not grabbing or pushing with hands and deemed even and safe by the referee.

Standardization

Since 2009, various governing bodies have been created within the polo community to advance the sport and create rule sets. The North American Hardcourt Bike Polo Association (NAHBPA) and European Hardcourt (EHBP) have been the prime organizations influencing standardization. Still, other regions have formed organizations, such as the Australasian Hardcourt (AHBP) and Bici Polo Latinoamerica (BPLA), as the sport spreads to other continents and countries all over the world.

Many Polo clubs have adopted formal Codes of Conduct to establish community standards and promote inclusive play environments. These documents typically outline expected behaviors both on and off the court, accountability processes for conflict resolution, and guidelines for maintaining welcoming spaces for players of diverse backgrounds. These codes often emphasize the importance of constructive feedback between players and may include provisions for conflict mediation. The adoption of such codes reflects the sport's evolution on a local level from informal pickup games to more organized club structures, though implementation varies significantly between regions and is not universally standardized across the sport.

Technique

High-level technical bike and ball handling skills have become commonplace in the sport. Training camps have been hosted in Europe, North America, and Australia so that players can gain competitive skills. Bike handling skills borrowed from non-racing bike disciplines like BMX, bike dance, trials and fixed gear freestyle have been introduced such as the wheelie turn and the endo-pivot.

== Tournament format ==
Though there are common styles of play, such as 3v3, Squad, and Bench, there are many formats for a tournament, with host clubs often employing customized rule sets. "3v3" consists of three-player teams 10–15 minutes in length, Squad teams have 4 to 5 players and games between 30 and 40 minutes allowing for substitutions. In addition to these, there is Bench with teams of 6 to 12 players, allowing for whole squad substitutions and games lasting between 60 and 90 minutes. All of these styles allow for a maximum of 3 players per team on the court at any given time. Competitive tournaments use Double-elimination tournaments held over two days for a traditional podium finish. Examples of other formats include:

ABC Shuffles (players are ranked A - Advance | B - Intermediate | C - Beginner; then grouped), Completely Random Shuffle (individual players grouped), 2v2 (for smaller courts), 4v4 (for larger hockey courts; 4th player on the court; the only time a permanent goalie is utilized) or 4v4 Duos (2 paired teams of 2), City vs City Bench style (6+ players per team), Bone Machine (best out of 3), Round-Robin, Gladiator or Thunderdome (often losing teams are shuffled and the rules dictate only one player can ultimately win), Swiss Rounds.

Worlds consist of teams that compete and qualify for regional slots and wildcard slots that are won the week of. 32 teams then complete in a Double-elimination tournament.

Beyond competitive tournaments, clubs host "Fun-focused Tournaments," which are a mainstay of the subculture. "Fun-focused Tournaments" may be infused with other games, such as the Cincinnati 3-Way (foosball and flip cup) or Lexington's Nerd City Classic (capture the flag), bizarre rules such as shuffle-only goals, and other hi-jinks that promote an inclusive party atmosphere.

One example of a Gladiator-style tournament is the Rose City Royal Rumble. The final team is pitted against each other in a one vs one vs one. A circle is formed by spectators around the center court where both goals are placed back to back. With one ball in play, two volunteer goalies, and three points to win, only one play can winner.

In Squad or Bench-style tournaments, a chosen team captain may be in charge of substitutions and communicating with the referee. This team captain may or may not be a player. The logistics of substitutions vary by court.

== Equipment ==
A well-used Street Hockey ball

Rather than use traditional wooden polo mallets, Hardcourt Bike Polo players started making handmade mallets much in the spirit of the DIY ethic. These mallets are a careful balance between weight and durability. Typical mallets are constructed using heads made from tubular UHMW plastic, aluminum shafts similar to ski poles and a connect joining the two. Since the early days, a number of companies producing bike polo-specific equipment have started. Although professional mallets are much more common on courts today, some clubs consider a homemade mallet to be a rite of passage. Due to community-sourced advancements in connection technology, lightweight low-cost carbon fiber golf shafts have begun gaining popularity in recent years, but not without criticism. Critics consider them too fragile for competitive play, while proponents cite the increased maneuverability and reduced wrist strain. In 2024, a number of polo companies released polo-specific carbon fiber shafts as this new technology begins to dominate the sport.

The ball used in bike polo is typically made from PVC and is identical to a Street Hockey ball. In 2012, the pioneer but now defunct Fixcraft, polo-specific company, teamed up with D-Gel, hockey product manufacturer, to produce the first official bike polo ball. Balls come in a variety of hardnesses designed for different temperatures, as balls are known to crack in cold temperatures.

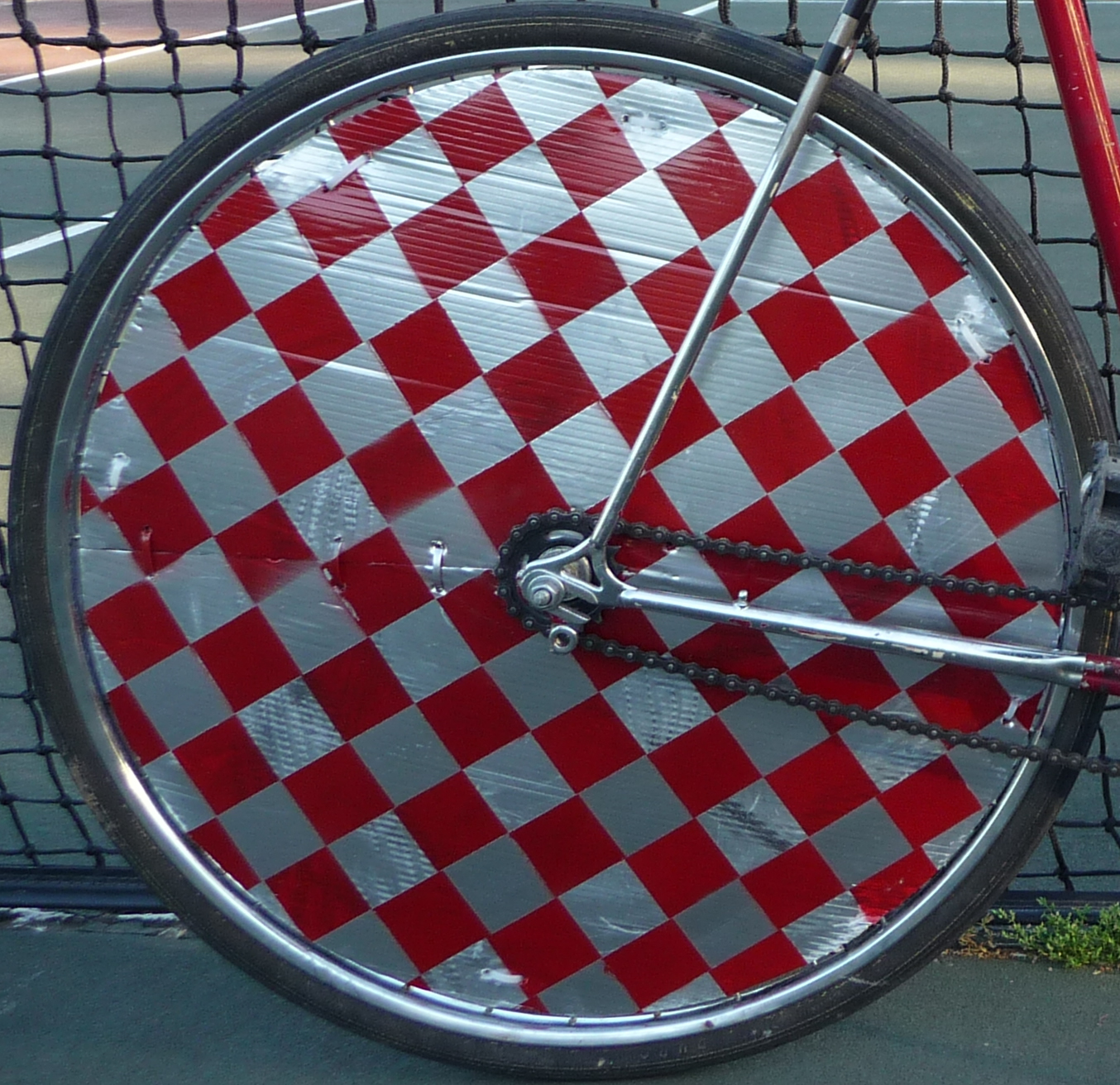
Freshly painted wheel cover

Any bike with a working brake is acceptable for the game, eventually most players customize their bikes especially for bike polo and their playing needs. Though personal preference varies greatly amongst players common competitive bicycle configurations include: a low ratio (between 1:1.5 - 1:1.8), a strong front disc brake with rotor guard, a single brake lever on the opposite hand to your mallet hand, a single speed freewheel cog, a track style or polo specific frame, a narrow set of flat or riser handlebars, clipless pedals, wheel covers, and frame padding.

Some players use or fabricate wheel covers made from corrugated plastic, polycarbonate, window screen mesh, or heavy fabric to protect spokes and create solid surface for blocking shots. The adoption of covers is often prompted by a defensive experience in which a hard lifted shot passes through an unshielded wheel and results in a goal.

In competitive play, a netted goal similar to those used in ice hockey is required. Traditionally, a non-netted goal is utilized, such as two traffic cones placed two bikes apart (i.e., 4 feet).

== Courts ==
Players who lack a polo-specific court commonly play on other hardcourt surfaces such as tennis courts, roller rinks, basketball courts, or futsal courts. These are then customized using boards forming an enclosed rectangle with rounded or angled corners, to keep the ball from rolling out of the court or getting stuck in the corners. The NAH mandates goals be 3ft x 6ft (.9m x 1.8m) and must be placed no closer than 6ft (1.8m) from the backboard. Court size does vary, but for a court to be used in an official NAH event, it must be no larger than 155ft x 80ft (47.25m x 25m) and no smaller than 120ft x 60ft (37m x 18m), and must have 4ft (1.2m) high solid boards.

=== Polo Specific Courts ===
The original courts like New York City's "The Pit" or Seattle's "Judkins Park" are repurposed spaces. Some city parks departments have worked with their local Polo club and have built facilities specifically for Polo or multi-use activities, including Polo.

East Vancouver's investment in a bicycle polo court at Grandview Park project cost around $90,000 to complete and included concrete walls, drainage, paving, seating, and fencing.

== History ==
Cycle polo was invented in 1891 and reached the Olympics as a demonstration sport in 1908. The sport has seen peaks in popularity in the 1930s and 1980s but has most recently been revived by the fixed-gear scene, giving the sport a new lease of life.

Writer Matthew Sparkes compares Hardcourt polo to traditional bike polo "as streetball is to basketball: grittier, more easily accessible and, to be honest, more fun".

Modern Hardcourt Bike Polo has its roots in early 2000s pacific north west. Originally started by bicycle messengers who had downtime in between deliveries, the early game developed with some of the core rules being established (3 on 3, scoring with the flat end of the mallet). One origin story tracks back to 1998 in the middle of the Dot Com era. Jay Grisham gathered messengers to play in garages around Seattle. Later Matt Messenger, aka Messman, and others working for Kozmo would play in the company's Seattle parking lot known as the "Sunkin'" between deliveries.

=== Cycle Messenger World Championships and the spread ===
As with any new sport, there were ups and downs during the beginning. Individuals in Portland began playing in 2002 as the sport was first beginning to spread around. During the Seattle hosted Cycle Messenger World Championships (CMWC) in 2003, the game was first showcased, and here it gained significant exposure and momentum. The game was officially incorporated into the 2008 CMWC in Toronto, thanks to enthusiastic participation from bicycle messengers. This event served as a significant catalyst, being dubbed the "World Bike Polo Championships." As people moved and traveled and word of the game spread from blogs like The Radavist and documentaries like Hit 'Em In The Mouth , Count it, and Murder of Couriers clubs proliferated to new cities. Now, the sport has continued to grow in popularity, and today, there are clubs worldwide. Hardcourt bike polo branched out and is currently played in over 30 countries and 300 cities. With the formation of Cairo Bike Polo, Egypt's first club, the sport is now being played competitively on six continents.

=== Professional Hardcourt Bike Polo ===
In early 2015, Fixcraft hosted a tournament exploring the idea of professionalizing the sport. With professional recording equipment and a cash prize. Fixcraft sought to create a well-manicured media product to potentially sell the broadcasting rights but was never able to do so before folding. The tournament did however create a large backlash within the community, sparking a conversation on the direction the sport was taking, inclusiveness, and the role of sponsorship. High-level polo tournaments have since been recorded with professional-level equipment by the Canadian-base team Connect Bike Polo.

=== Tournament Archiving and Analysis ===
Efforts to archive tournaments began in the 2010s, when the website Podium maintained detailed statistics for most tournaments, and a Vimeo user turned bike polo personality known as Mr.Do recorded footage of nearly all North American events. Archiving has continued in the 2020s, aided by high-quality livestreams produced by users such as Los Angeles Bike Polo and Down Over Polo. Some clubs have also collected detailed data from seasonal city leagues in an attempt to gain a competitive edge through statistical analysis.

=== Museum and Exhibition Spaces ===
The preservation of hardcourt bike polo history is maintained through specialized, localized exhibition spaces embedded within regional cycling communities. In Europe, the Musée de Bike Polo, located in Paris, France, focuses on the documentation and history of the European hardcourt bike polo circuit. The museum is housed within the Stole Garage bicycle shop. Conversely, North American developments in the sport are preserved at the Bike Polo Museum in Seattle, Washington. Hosted within the Whisper Wheel Works bicycle shop, this institution curates archival material, equipment, and memorabilia specific to the North American hardcourt bicycle polo community.

== Competitive tournaments ==
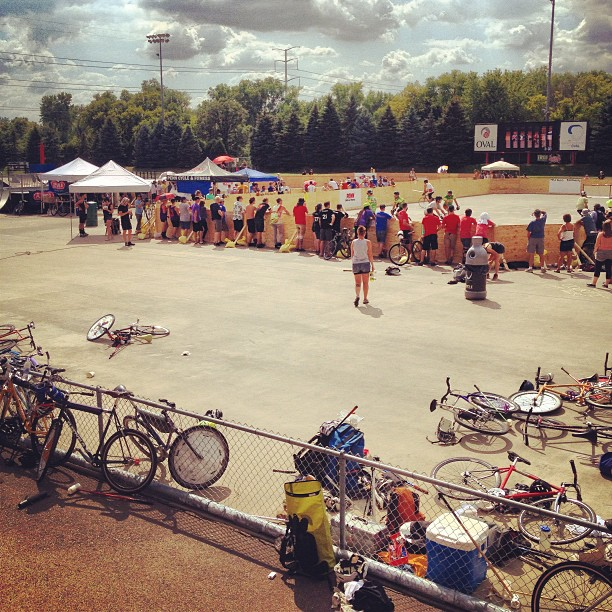
NAHBPC 2013 Roseville, Minnesota

Since 2004, cities across North America have thrown inter-city tournaments such as the Eastside, Westside, Northside, and Desertside Polo Invites.

The first tournament to bear the title "World Championships" was held in Toronto in 2008 as part of the Cycle Messenger World Championships, attracting over 100 participants across 35 teams. Despite the presence of European teams, there is contention over whether this event should be considered the first official world championship, as European teams elected not to compete in the elimination bracket. The 2009 World Hardcourt Bike Polo Championships aka Worlds, held in Philadelphia with teams from the United States, Canada, England, France, Germany, Switzerland, and Italy, is widely regarded as the first official world championship.

Competitive national, local, and regional championships have been held in numerous countries, including Australia, New Zealand, the United Kingdom, the United States, Chile, and Germany. For the purposes of the Worlds, the sport has been organized into regions North America, Europe, South America, Australasia, Asia, and Africa each of which fields qualifying teams through its own self organized championship circuit.

The first annual North American and European Hardcourt Bicycle Polo championships were both held in August 2009. The European tournament drew over 40 teams from Great Britain, France, Switzerland, Spain, Italy, and Germany and was won by L'Equipe, a team from Geneva. The North American tournament featured 36 teams from Seattle, Vancouver BC, Milwaukee, Chicago, New York, Ottawa, Portland, Washington DC, and elsewhere. The first prize for each tournament were tickets to the 2010 World Championships held in Berlin.

European Hardcourt Bike Polo Championship 2013

In 2016, the North American Hardcourt Bike Polo Association announced that they were changing the format for all of their sanctioned tournaments from 3v3 to Squad meaning an extra player would join each team and could be rotated in.

On February 21st, 2026, the coldest bike polo tournament was held in Whitehorse, Canada. Temperatures dipped to -20°Celsius.

== See also ==
- Cycle polo
