= Cycle Messenger World Championships =

Urban cycling competition

The Cycle Messenger World Championships, or CMWCs, are an annual urban cycling competition whereby cycle messengers and cycling enthusiasts showcase their skills in an array of events, many of which simulate everyday tasks for a cycle messenger. Each year, the CMWCs are held in a different city around the world, with each host city designing its own unique course. The highlight of the CMWCs is the main race in which cyclists are given manifests and must pickup and deliver items to various locations around the host city as quickly and efficiently as possible. The total number of pickups and deliveries, or "drop offs" is unknown to the messengers before the race, but has been known to reach up to 100 stops and usually takes between 3–4 hours to complete. The cyclist who completes all of the assigned deliveries in the least amount of time wins the race. In addition to the main race there are also several side events which have become increasingly popular over the past few years. These events change yearly depending on the discretion of the host city but usually include backward circles, bike polo, bunnyhop, cargo bike race, longest skid, sprints, and trackstand.

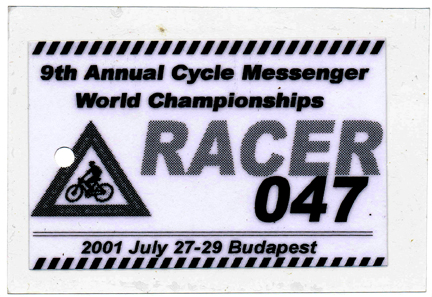
A racer's spoke card from the Cycle Messenger World Championships, Budapest, Hungary, 2001

== History ==
The idea for the Cycle Messenger World Championships, or Cycle Messenger Championships (CMCs) as it was initially called, was first conceived in 1992 by Achim Beier and his assistant, Stefan Klessman. Both worked for messenger Berlin, a Berlin-based messenger service, and were inspired to have a gathering of the world's bicycle messengers after talking with co-worker and ex-Washington D.C. bicycle messenger Michael "Ozone" Odom. Beier then took a trip to New York City where he visited Washington Square Park and talked with local bicycle messengers including James "The General" Moore about the proposed idea. The idea was received well by the local messengers and thus Beier and Klessman began planning the logistics of the first Cycle Messenger Championships.

Since no competition of this type had ever taken place, there were many challenges to overcome before the first CMC be completed. Most notably, the host city, Berlin, needed to approve the proposal of such an event. This, in itself, was an enormous task since many streets had to be shut down for an entire weekend, the duration of the event, including Straße des 17. Juni, the main thoroughfare for East-West traffic through Berlin, and the area around Brandenburg Gate. In the end, the city of Berlin approved the event with only minor changes to Beier's requests and in 1993 the first Cycle Messenger Championships took place. In all, around 500 messengers participated in the inaugural event.

Though the 1993 CMC was declared a success, it lost a substantial amount of money. As a result, Beier and Klessman decided to transfer ownership of the event to a sports marketing company which had expressed interest in organizing it. Beier and Klessman stayed with the project, acting as consultants, to ensure that the competition retained its authenticity.

The marketing company, though based in Berlin, had a partner in London and thus it was decided that the 1994 CMWC would be located there. Unfortunately though, months before the scheduled date of the CMWC the marketing company pulled its sponsorship of the event and left Beier and Klessman alone on the project.

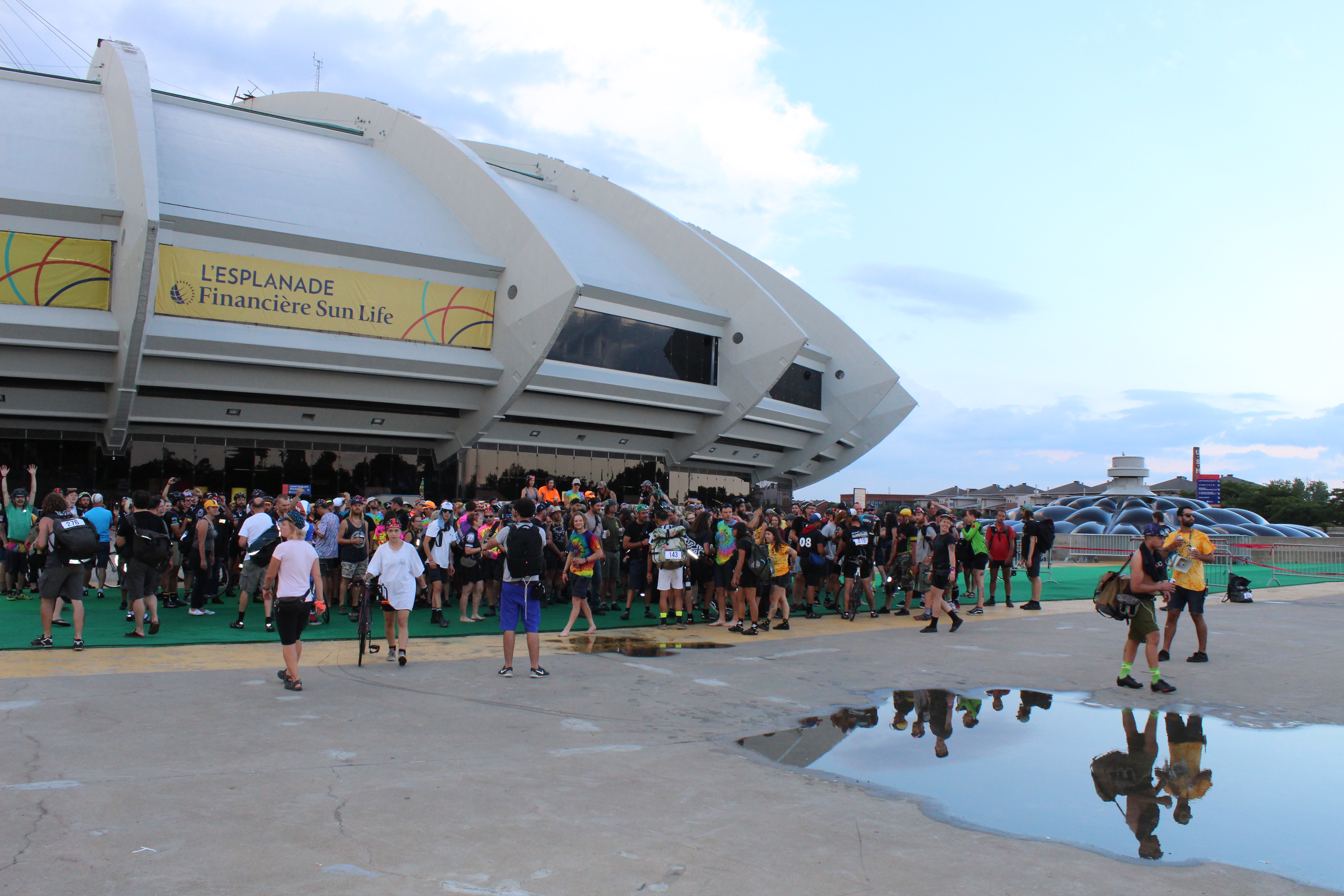
Group Photo from the Cycle Messenger World Championship in Montreal, 2017

After much deliberation, it was decided that the 1994 CMWC would still take place in London, though now it would be organized solely by cycle messengers. Against all odds, the event took place and attracted around 500 participants. Once again, the CMWC was deemed a success.

With the sting of the marketing company's withdrawal still fresh, several cycle messengers at the 1994 event decided to form a committee dedicated to the successful realization of the CMWC. Largely self-appointed and without any real power the committee floundered. The need for such an organization, however, was being realized by more and more cyclists.

The 1995 CMWC took place in Toronto, and in 1996 it was hosted in San Francisco. It was here that the International Federation of Bike Messengers Association, or IFBMA, was created for the purpose of guaranteeing that the CMWC would take place each year. This committee, unlike the previous one, was open to all who wished to attend and thus had the potential of being a legitimate organization.

== Cycle Messenger World Championships ==
Since the inception of the IFBMA the CMWCs have taken place each year in different locations around the world. The following is a list of host cities along with the year they hosted the CMWCs and the champions from each year.

=== Categories ===
From the very first CMWC, the main race had two gender categories that participants could compete in, Men and Women.

At the 2017 championship in Montreal, the name of the women's category was changed to the more inclusive "WTNB", which meant that the category was open to women, trans people, and non-binary people.

The year after, at the 2018 championship in Riga, the WTNB category was again renamed to WTF while the men's category was renamed "Open" allowing people of any gender to compete in this category. At the same championship, thanks to the work of the Star Bike Messenger Association (formerly the Women's Bike Messenger Association), official guidelines about gender categories at CMWC's were voted in as an amendment to the IFBMA by-laws. This meant that all future CMWC's must have two categories named Open and WTNB.

In 2022 at the championship in New York City the organizers chose to divide the WTNB category into two separate categories named "WT", which was open for women and trans people and "NB", which was only open for non-binary people.

Year	Host city	Host Country	Main race champions					
Year	Host city	Host Country	Men's		Women's			
Year	Host city	Host Country	Name	Country, City	Name		Country, City	
1993	Berlin	Germany	Andy Scheider	Germany, Cologne	Ursi Haenny		Switzerland, Basel	
1994	London	England	Andy Scheider	Germany, Cologne	Ivonne Kraft		Germany, Düsseldorf	
1995	Toronto	Canada	Lars Urban	Germany, Bremen	Ivonne Kraft		Germany, Düsseldorf	
1996	San Francisco	United States	Sven Baumann	Switzerland	Ivonne Kraft		Germany, Düsseldorf	
1997	Barcelona	Spain	Lars Urban	Germany, Bremen	Ilona Luukko		Finland, Helsinki	
1998	Washington D.C.	United States	Korte	Denmark, Copenhagen	Ivonne Kraft		Germany, Düsseldorf	
1999	Zürich	Switzerland	Friday	Denmark, Copenhagen	Chrissy Schenk		Switzerland, Zürich	
2000	Philadelphia	United States	Carsten Schaffer	Denmark, Copenhagen	Sheba Farrin		United States Washington D.C.	
2001	Budapest	Hungary	Roger Zuercher	Switzerland, Zürich	Pia		Denmark, Copenhagen	
2002	Copenhagen	Denmark	Stefan "Cookie" Koch	Germany, Karlsruhe	Johanna "Jojo" Reeder		Sweden Stockholm	
2003	Seattle	United States	Raphel Faiss	Switzerland, Lausanne	Sheba Farrin		United States Washington D.C.	
2004	Edmonton	Canada	Raphel Faiss	Switzerland, Lausanne	Johanna "Jojo" Reeder		Sweden Stockholm	
2005	New York City	United States	Karl Stransky	Switzerland, Barsel	Johanna "Jojo" Reeder		Sweden Stockholm	
2006	Sydney	Australia	Raphel Faiss	Switzerland, Lausanne	Sarah Torgrimson		United States, San Francisco	
2007	Dublin	Ireland	Peter Bradshaw	United States, Boston	Jaimie Lusk		United States, Denver	
2008	Toronto	Canada	Hiroyuki Shinozuka	Japan, Tokyo	Jenna Makgill		New Zealand, Auckland	
2009	Tokyo	Japan	Juri Hanazumi	Japan, Tokyo	Johanna "Jojo" Reeder		Sweden Stockholm	
2010	Panajachel	Guatemala	Craig Etheridge	United States, Seattle	Josephine Reitzel		Switzerland, Lausanne	
2011	Warsaw	Poland	Michael Brinkmann	Germany, Bremen	Jenna Makgill		New Zealand, Auckland	
2012	Chicago	United States	Craig Etheridge	United States, Seattle	Josephine Reitzel		Switzerland, Lausanne	
2013	Lausanne	Switzerland	Austin Horse	United States, New York	Josephine Reitzel		Switzerland, Lausanne	
2014	Mexico City	Mexico	Raphael Pfeiffer	Canada, Montreal	Christina Peck		United States, San Francisco	
2015	Melbourne	Australia	Austin Horse	United States, New York	Christina Peck		United States, San Francisco	
2016	Paris	France	Johannes "Jojo" Killisperger	Denmark, Copenhagen	Cécile Bloch		France, Paris	
2017	Montreal	Canada	Johannes "Jojo" Killisperger	Denmark, Copenhagen	WTNB			
2017	Montreal	Canada	Johannes "Jojo" Killisperger	Denmark, Copenhagen	Cécile Bloch		France, Paris	
2018	Riga	Latvia	Open		WTF			
2018	Riga	Latvia	Jimmi "Jumbo" Bargisen	Denmark, Copenhagen	Clara "Orca" Felis		Austria, Vienna	
2019	Jakarta	Indonesia	Jimmi "Jumbo" Bargisen	Denmark, Copenhagen	WTNB			
2019	Jakarta	Indonesia	Jimmi "Jumbo" Bargisen	Denmark, Copenhagen	Emma "Sdrella" Missale		Italy, Milan	
2020	No CMWC due to COVID-19							
2021	No CMWC due to COVID-19							
2022	New York City	United States	Chikappa	Japan, Tokyo	WT		NB	
2022	New York City	United States	Chikappa	Japan, Tokyo	Emma "Shottie" Missale	Denmark, Copenhagen	Maeve Mueller	United States, San Francisco
2023	Yokohama	Japan	Brian "Safa" Wagner	United States, Los Angeles	WTNB			
2023	Yokohama	Japan	Brian "Safa" Wagner	United States, Los Angeles	Emma "Shottie" Missale		Denmark, Copenhagen	
2024	Zürich	Switzerland	Leon "Wendy" Wrede	Denmark, Copenhagen	Clara "Orca" Felis		Austria, Vienna	
2025	Sydney	Australia	Matias "Fergie" Ovens	Denmark, Copenhagen	Emma "Shottie" Missale		Denmark, Copenhagen	
2026	Milan	Italy	Matias "Fergie" Ovens	Denmark, Copenhagen	Cécil		Switzerland, Lausanne	

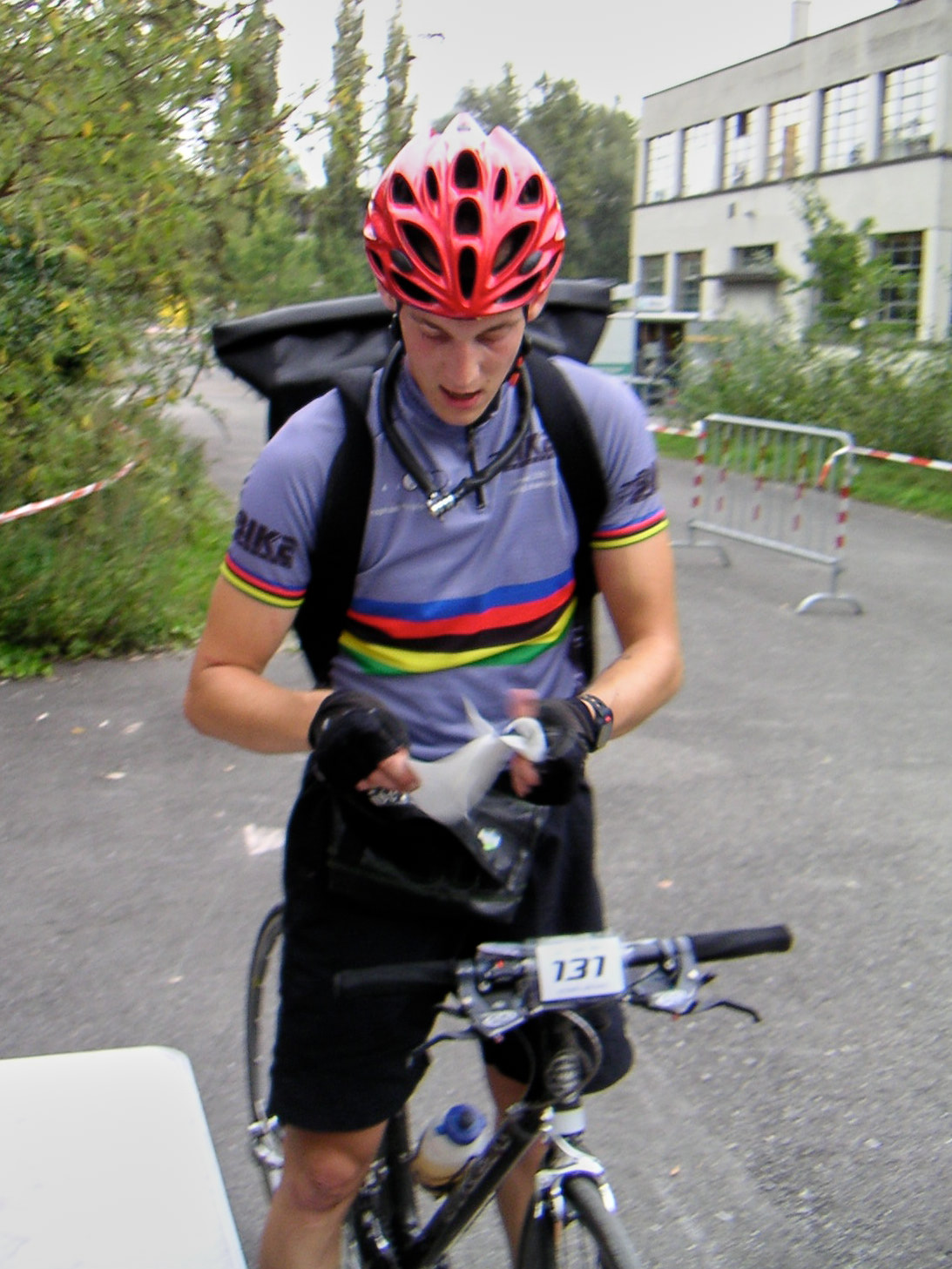
Raphael Faiss in 2004

== Events ==
=== Main Race ===
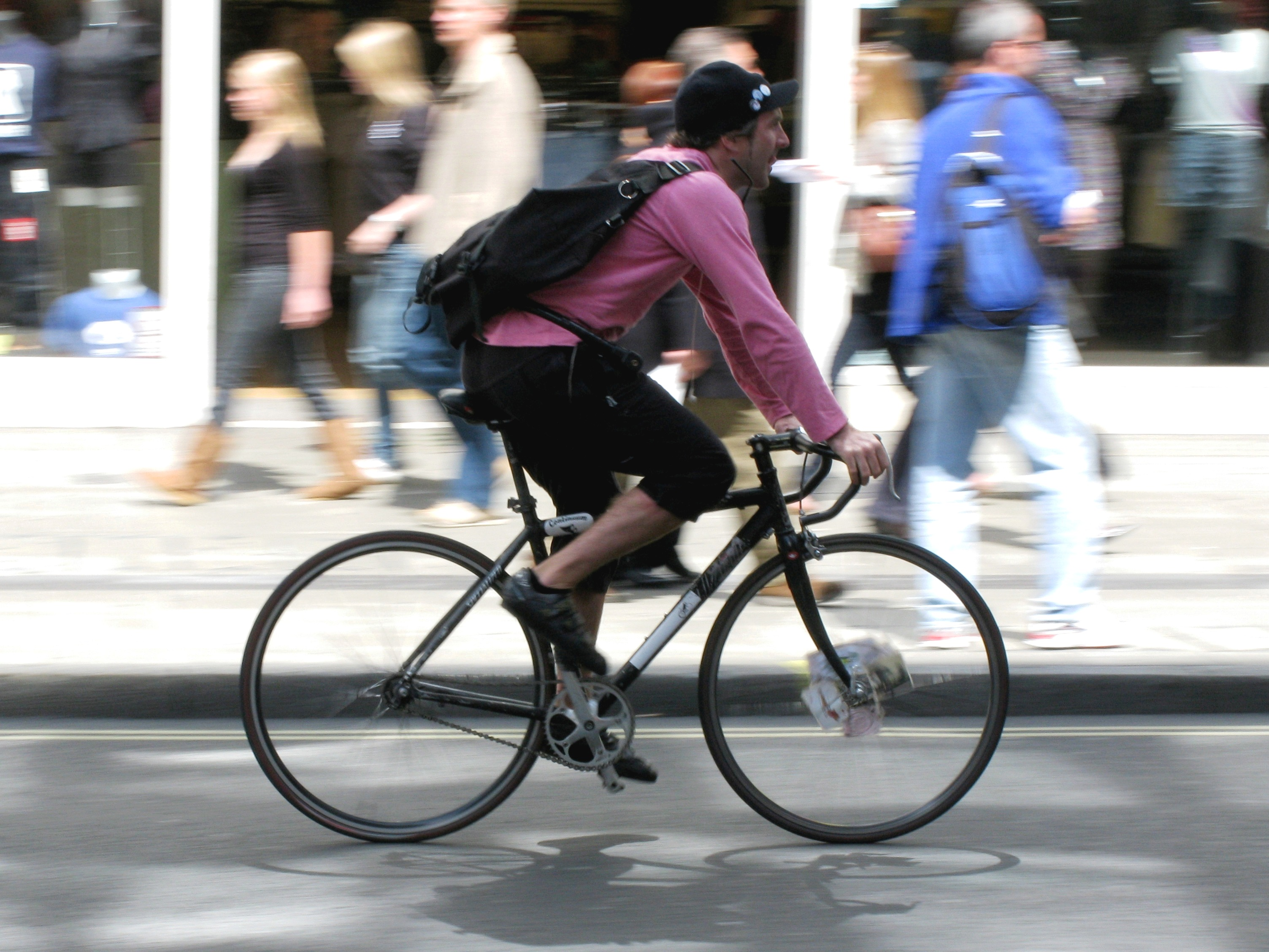
London cycle messenger

The main race is designed to simulate the normal workday of a cycle messenger. At the start of the race, depending on what format is used, each messenger is given a manifest or a number of packages with the location of pick-ups and drop-offs of packages throughout the closed course. The course is composed of numbered or named checkpoints spread throughout a closed course which has been anywhere from a few kilometers to 10 kilometers or more in total track distance. Participants usually must traverse the length & breadth of the course many times to complete the event. The messengers seek to quickly and efficiently plan their routes in order to pick up and deliver each package in a timely manner. Several different systems have been used, most of these involve manifests, some involve multiple manifests. The total number of manifests and deliveries is unknown to the messengers before the start of the race but has been known to reach as high as 100 pick-ups and drop-offs. The field of cyclists is narrowed down after each manifest in some forms of this event but in others no elimination process is used and results are tallied for the entire field. The event usually takes between 3 and 4 hours to complete.

=== Cargo race ===
The cargo bike race is a side event requiring cyclists to transport oversized objects from one point to another. Typical objects chosen for delivery range from beer kegs to boxes. Hay bales, pallets and lengths of lumber are also used in the challenge. Cyclists are encouraged to come up with creative ways of transporting such irregularly shaped objects while still using a bicycle. Many competitors prefer to use panniers and trailers, while some even use specially designed bicycles for the event.

=== Sprints ===
The sprints are a shorter distance race, usually ranging from 200–300 meters in length, on a closed course with the cyclist crossing the finish line first declared the winner. Elimination rounds are utilized to determine the winner, usually 5-10 participants race each heat.

=== Track stand ===
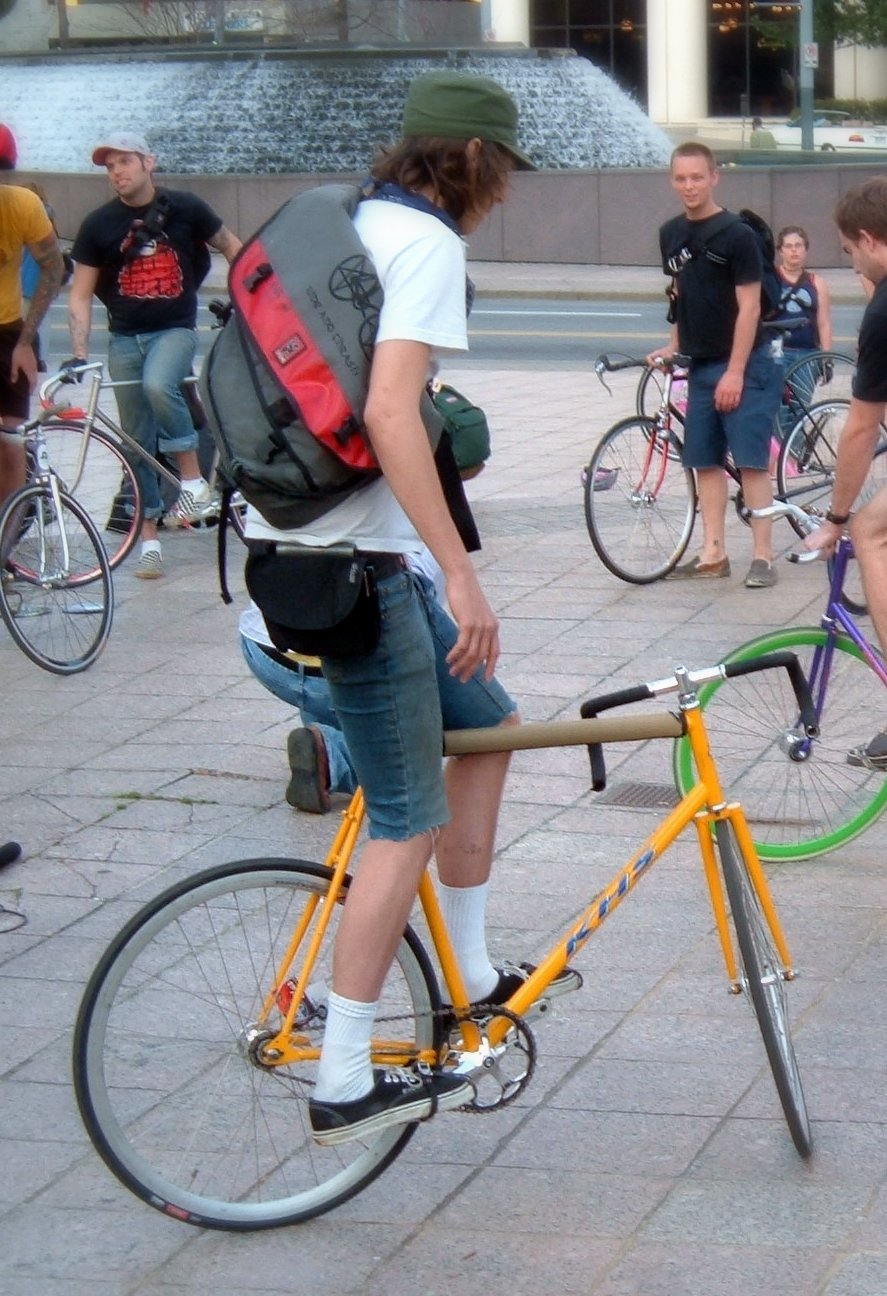
Cyclist performing a trackstand without hands.

The track stand competition is an event in which cyclists try to maintain a stationary position for as long as possible while on a bicycle. All cyclists start off with both hands and feet on the bike in the traditional trackstand position. As the competition progresses, cyclists are instructed to remove specific limbs from the bicycle. The order which cyclists remove their limbs from the bicycle usually starts with taking off one hand, then both hands, one foot, then both feet. The cyclist who remains balanced in an upright and stationary position the longest is declared the winner.

=== Skids ===
This competition consists of cyclists attempting to create the longest skid. Quite possibly one of the most dangerous events other than the main race, competitors sprint toward a starting line then lock up their back wheel to initiate the skid. Competitors must then balance themselves over their handlebars to create as little friction as possible between the rear stationary wheel and the ground while still steering their bicycle. Each cyclist is given two attempts to skid as far as possible. The record for the longest skid at the CMWC is set around 500 feet. It is not necessary to actually leave a "skid mark" and competitors are allowed to move their pedals slightly as well as to cause the rear wheel to leave the ground while trying to pivot their weight forward in order to decease friction between the road surface and rear wheel. An Exhibition event, this skill has no application in the actual function of a bicycle messenger.

=== Backward Circles ===
Like the Skids, this event has no correlation in simulating the ordinary workday of a cycle messenger. This competition requires cyclists to pedal backwards in consistent and consecutive circles. The cyclist who can complete the most consecutive backward circles is declared the winner.

=== Bunny hop ===
This event has been described as the high jump of cycling. Designed to simulate the need for avoiding obstacles during a messenger's workday, contestants must use their bikes to jump over a bar of increasing height. Contestants unable to clear the bar after two attempts at a particular height are eliminated from the competition. The last contestant remaining is declared the winner. The current CMWC record for this event is 1.27 meters set by Marlon Prather at the 1998 CMWC in Washington D.C., USA. Since the late 1990s a notable rise in popularity of the fixed gear bicycle has caused this event to decline as few participants are able to bunnyhop their fixed gear bicycles over any object of much more than 10 to 20 centimeters.

=== Bike polo ===
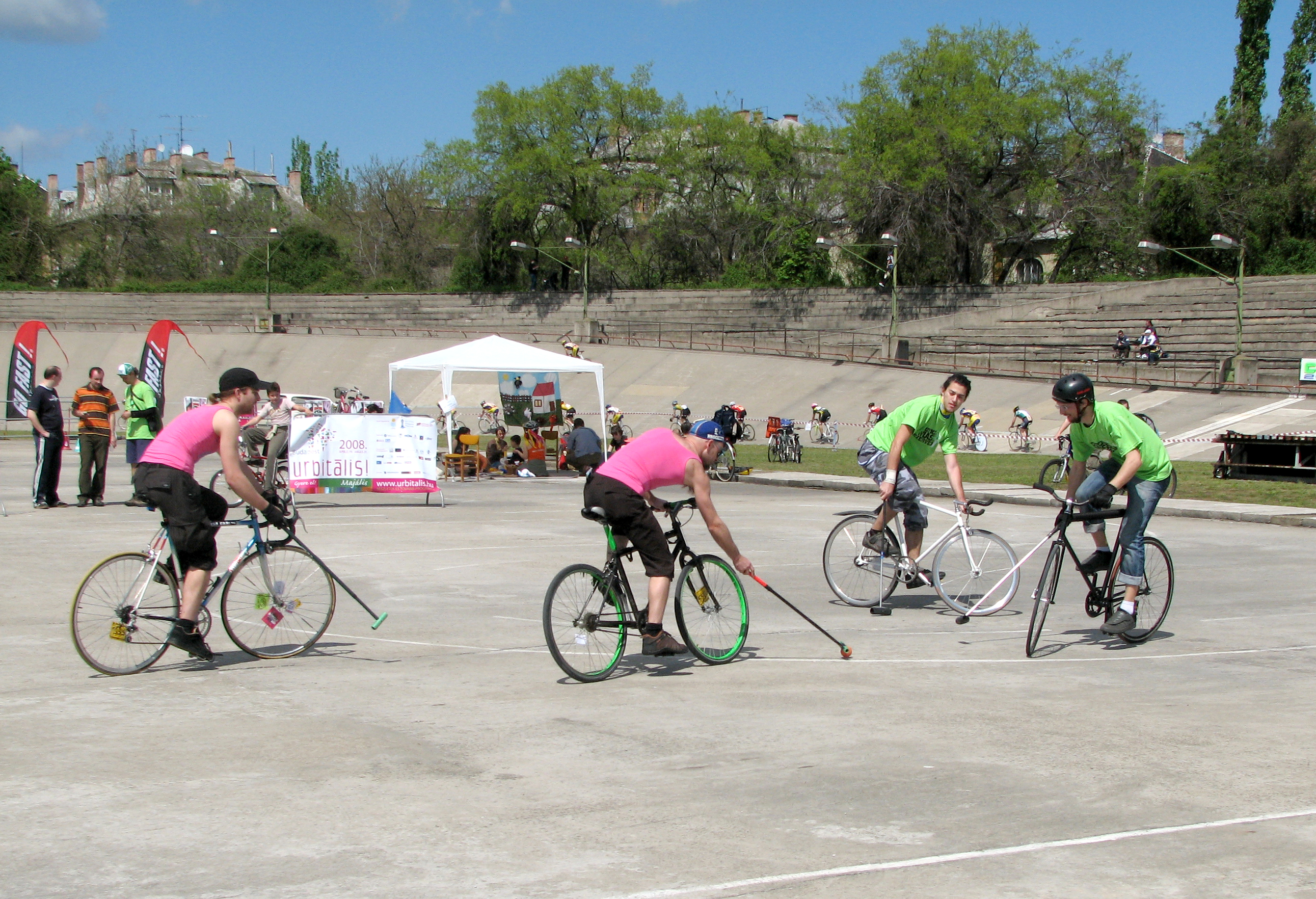
Bike polo match at the Earth Day 2008 celebration in the Millenáris velodrome in Budapest.

Hardcourt bike polo follows the same general guidelines as hockey only this event is played using bikes. This event has no direct correlation to any particular bicycle messenger skill beyond bike control but was introduced for the 2003 CMWC in Seattle as an exhibition event. 2008 CMWC in Toronto saw the sport officially introduced as a number of bicycle messengers enjoy playing the game. Bicycle messengers are credited for much of the games hype and expansion around the globe. The 2008 tournament drew over 100 participants on 35 teams and lasted throughout entirety of the event. It was the first large and international bike polo tourney in history, presented as the first ever "World Bike Polo Championships." Only a portion of the participants were bicycle messengers, the rest were polo players drawn to the tournament for its potential size due to its sponsorship by the CMWC 2008. The tournament's results were not included as CMWC results. Teams consisting of three cyclists used mallets to pass a ball and score as many goals as possible. Teams usually compete on a concrete court of varying sizes.

=== La Ocho ===
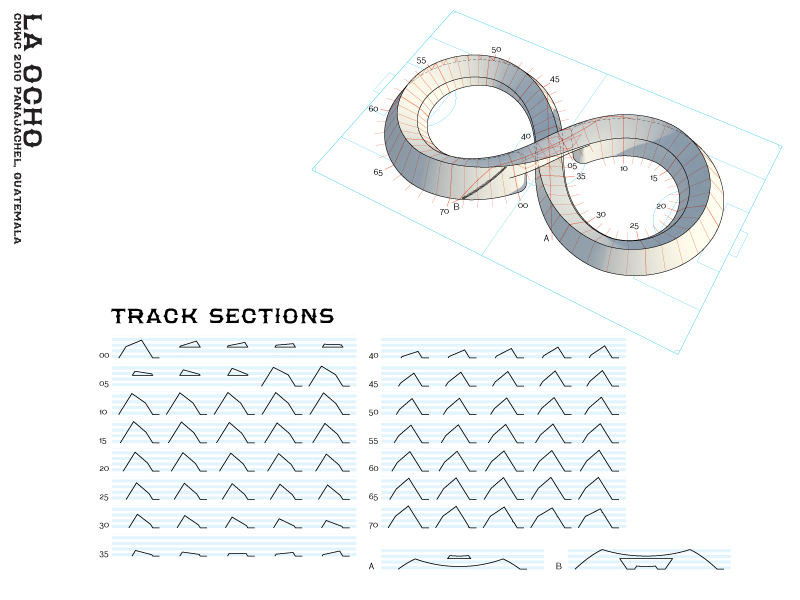
La Ocho track sections, Dieter Janssen architect

This event is not considered a portion of the CMWC but was attempted on one occasion at a CMWC event in Guatemala, but the event was never realized.

This figure-8 track was designed by architect Dieter Janssen especially for the 2010 CMWC at Panajachel, Guatemala. The 200 meter course consisted of an Euler spiral loop built from rammed-earth with banked curves and a heavy timber over-under bridge intersection in the middle. The geometry was idealized for a 65 km/h speed, though its range could support a minimum of 12.8 km/h and a maximum of 140.9 km/h based on an average rider's weight, the expected frictional force and a maximum inclination angle of 45 degrees. Unfortunately, the track was destroyed by rain before the event took place. The race was held on level ground with no bridge. Lines drawn on the surface indicated where the track might have been. In construction it never resembled the design provided by the architect, heavy timber abandoned for 4x4 & 2x4 stud frame construction. Banked turns were never achieved.

== Reception ==
The CMWCs have been well received by the local populations of several host cities while others consider the event a nuisance. For instance, the 2007 CMWCs in Dublin, Ireland, were pushed to the outer limits of the city after the local population protested the event. On the other hand, the 2002 CMWCs held in Copenhagen, Denmark, were welcomed by the city and competitors were even treated to a free breakfast and free beer courtesy of the mayor.

== See also ==
- European Cycle Messenger Championships
