= Hard court =

Type of tennis court surface

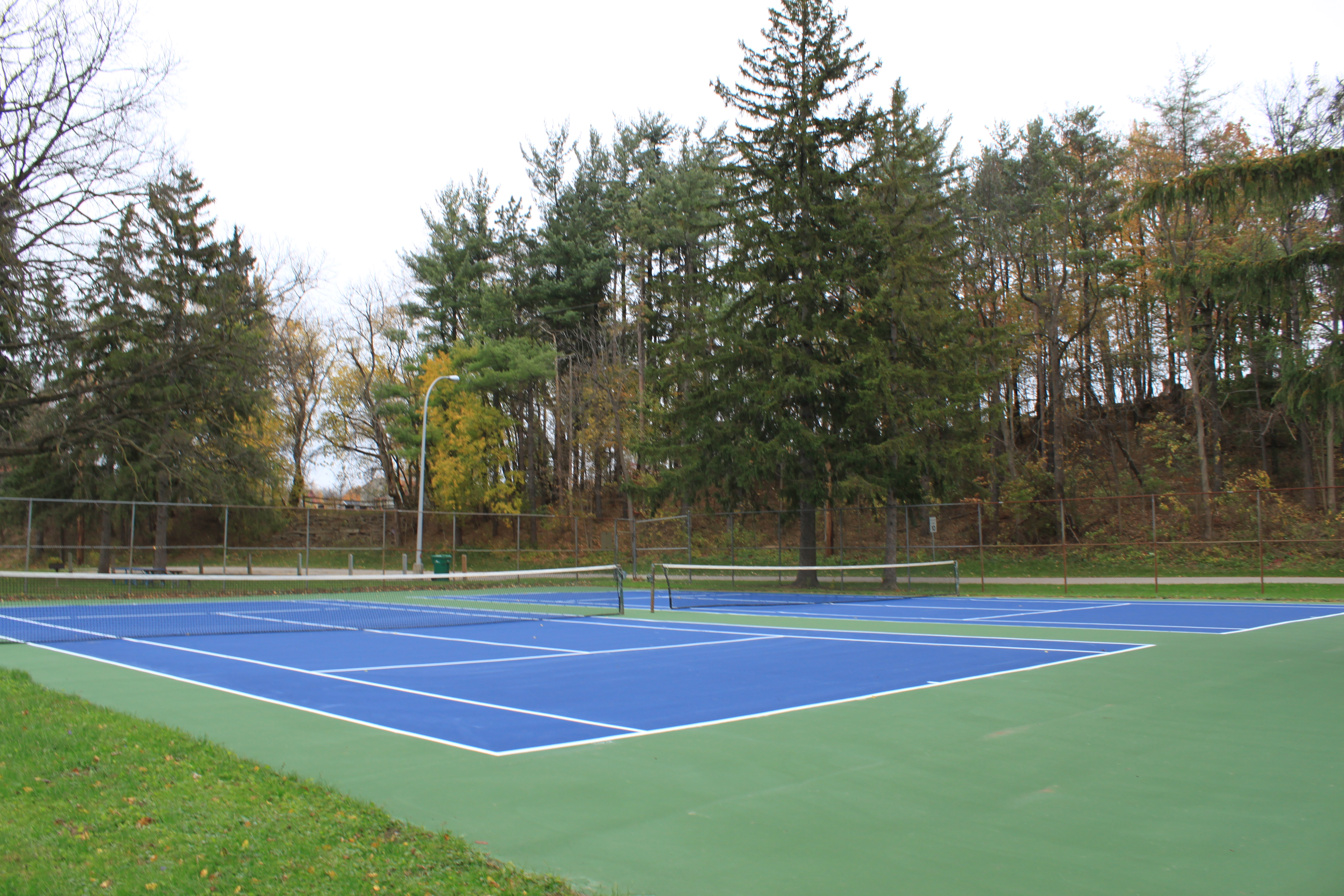
Tennis hard court, Curtiss Park, Saline, Michigan

A hard court or hardcourt is a type of surface or floor on which a sport is played, most usually in reference to tennis courts. It is typically made of rigid materials such as asphalt or concrete, and covered with acrylic resins to seal the surface and mark the playing lines, while providing some cushioning. Historically, hardwood surfaces were also in use in indoor settings, similar to an indoor basketball court, but these surfaces are rare now.

== Tennis ==
Tennis hard courts are made of synthetic/acrylic layers on top of a concrete or asphalt foundation and can vary in color. These courts tend to play medium-fast to fast because there is little energy absorption by the court, as with grass courts but unlike clay courts. The ball tends to bounce high and players are able to apply many types of spin during play. Speed of rebound after tennis balls bounce on hard courts is determined by how much sand is in the synthetic/acrylic layer placed on top of the asphalt foundation. More sand will result in a slower bounce due to more friction.

The US Open and the Australian Open currently use hard courts, and it is the predominant surface type used on the professional tour.

=== Maintenance ===
There are numerous hard court maintenance methods which are commonly used to keep these facilities in top condition. Some of these include brushing, pressure washing with a cleaning solution and applying chemical treatments to prevent the growth of moss and algae. Anti-slip paint is also applied to hard courts to give better playing qualities which enhance player safety and performance.

== Prominent brands ==
Some prominent brands of hard court surfaces used at professional tournaments include:

- DecoTurf
- GreenSet
- Laykold
- Plexicushion
- Rebound Ace
- SportMaster Sport Surfaces

== See also ==
- Clay court
- Carpet court
- Grass court
- Wood court
- Hardcourt Bike Polo
