= Barsel =

Barsel is a surname. Notable people with the surname include:

- Esther Barsel (1925–2008), South African political activist
- Hymie Barsel (1920–1987), South African activist
