= Freedom Trail (South Africa) =

Cycle route in South Africa

The Freedom Trail is a 2,150 km long, 33,000 metres of ups and downs, mountain bike route across South Africa, from Pietermaritzburg in the east to Wellington in the west. This technically challenging trail was started in 2003 and is made up of dirt roads, dirt tracks and cattle tracks featuring impressive geological and scenic diversity. It traverses seven biomes, from the high mountains of Lesotho, to the wide open spaces of the Great Karoo, crossing six mountain ranges, criss-crossing countless valleys, venturing through unspoilt wilderness areas, national parks, private farms and some nature reserves.

The trail is unmarked and requires proficiency in navigation, with riders making use of maps and narratives to follow the route. Accommodation stops are usually 6-8 hours apart, and include guest houses, country hotels, game lodges, nature reserve cottages and farm stays. Most of these stops are fully serviced, allowing riders to travel light.

Coolest times for the trail are the autumn months of March to May, and in the spring from September to early October. The summer months from November to February may be very hot, while winter months from June to August may be very cold, with possible snowfalls at high points along the route.

The Freedom Trail passes through both public and private land and any ride along the route is subject to availability and has to be pre-arranged and booked in advance. Many of the traversing rights granted over private land are contingent on riders making use of the overnight accommodation facilities and therefore camping is not allowed along the trail.

The Freedom Trail is managed by the Freedom Trail Foundation, which also administers the Freedom Challenge Scholarship Fund, a charity set up by past Freedom Challenge riders to provide education scholarships to underprivileged scholars living in certain areas through which the trail passes.

There are a number of events held annually along the trail, the best known being the iconic Freedom Challenge (also referred to as RASA - Race Across South Africa), The Freedom Challenge is held in mid-June to mid-July. This winter navigation race has a completion deadline of 26 days. Food and accommodation are provided at fixed overnight stops, but competitors are otherwise unsupported and cannot use GPS to navigate. The only official reward is the prestigious Freedom Challenge blanket awarded to all who finish inside the cut-off time. The Race to Rhodes is a shorter non-stop, unsupported event covering the first 500km of the trail from Pietermaritzburg to Rhodes and is also held in winter. An invitational event called the Race to Cradock is held in March. It follows the same non-stop unsupported format and is currently only open to previous finishers of either the Race to Rhodes or the Freedom Challenge. Then there is the Spring Ride to Rhodes, an introductory ride/tour held in September, where each group rides with a guide and a support vehicle.

== See also ==
- Marathon mountain bike races
