= LOTOJA =

Long distance one-day amateur bicycle road race

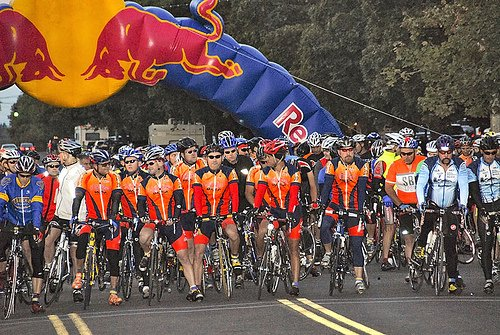
Starting line, 2007 LOTOJA

The LoToJa Classic is a long distance one-day amateur bicycle road race from Logan, UT to Jackson Hole, WY, USA. It is held in September on the first Saturday after Labor Day.

== History ==
LoToJa was started in 1983 by two Logan cyclists, David Bern, a student at Utah State University, and Jeff Keller, the owner of Sunrise Cyclery. The two men wanted a race that resembled the difficulty of a one-day European classic like Paris-Roubaix or the Tour of Flanders. LoToJa's first year featured nine cyclists racing 192 miles from Logan to a finish line in Jackson's town square. The winning time was just over nine hours by Bob VanSlyke.

=== 2006 ===
Kirk Eck won the 2006 LOTOJA Classic with a 9:16:56 time. This was his second win.

=== 2007 ===
The 2007 race included roughly 1,400 people from 40 different states in the United States. The fastest time in the 2007 edition of the race was posted by Mark Zimbelman, a resident of Provo, Utah, who won the masters 45+ category. His time of 9:06:44 was also good for a course record with Mark Schaefer finishing less than a wheel length behind. Schaefer and Zimbelman led the race alone for the last 100 miles (160 km). The winner of the Men's Pro Category 1 and 2 race was Cameron Hoffman of Clearfield, Utah with a time of 9:24:18.

=== 2009 ===
Zimbelman's course record held during 2008 but was beaten in the 2009 race by Cameron Hoffman of Clearfield, Utah with a time of 9:02:52. This was Hoffman's third year in a row winning the Men's Pro Category 1,2,3 race. Hoffman, David Francis of Las Vegas, Nevada, and Robert Lofgran of Salt Lake City, Utah had to chase racer Dave Botchek (Colorado Springs CO) who had been out in front 190 miles before being caught due to a puncture 13 miles from the finish. Dave Botchek had previously won the event in the 90's. They finished 1st, 2nd and 3rd, respectively with less than a second between Hoffman and Francis and Lofgran finishing about five seconds later.

=== 2010 ===
Cameron Hoffman's 2009 course record time of 9:02:52 was broken in 2010 by Alfred Thresher with a time of 9:01:44.

=== 2012 ===
Rob Verhaaren crashed and died during the final stages of the race in Wyoming.

A new LOTOJA course record was set by Leon Bergant from Slovenia, with the time of 8:57:19.

=== 2017 ===
Kai Applequist from Boise, Idaho set the new record in the men's division in 2017 with a time of 8:42:31.

=== 2018 ===
The current course record was set in 2018 by Spencer Johnson, of Riverton, Utah, with a time of 8:18:29. The women’s course record, 9:35:00, set in 2013, is held by Melinda MacFarlane from Salt Lake City, Utah.

=== 2023 ===
Over 1,500 cyclists participated in the 2023 race.

== Course ==
The race starts at the Sunrise Cyclery in Logan, Utah and heads north into southeastern Idaho and winds across western Wyoming. The finish line is near the base of the Grand Teton at Jackson Hole Mountain Resort (at Teton Village), one of America's ski destinations. Along the 203-mile (327 km) course are three mountain passes, plus hilly to rolling terrain that results in more than 7,000 feet (2,100 metres) of climbing.

== Notable winners ==
- Levi Leipheimer (Team RadioShack)
- Marty Jemison (U.S. Postal), 1997
- Scott Moninger, 1996
- John Frey
- Alison Tetrick, 2019

== Charitable fundraising ==
LoToJa is a fund-raiser for the Huntsman Cancer Foundation, Autism Spectrum Disorder Connections and other medical research foundations. By 2014, the LoToJa organizer, Epic Events had raised over US$250,000 for the Huntsman Cancer Foundation. As of 2023, over $2.7 million has been raised through sponsors and cyclists.

== Past winners ==
Year	Men		Women	
2020	Cameron Hoffman (USA)	9:02:48	Amy Heaton (USA)	10:02:16
2021	Nathan Spratt (USA)	8:31:18	Melissa Aitken (USA)	9:44:15
2022	John Borstelmann (USA)	8:41:43	Aileen Pannecoucke (USA)	9:58:00
2023	Seth Steed (USA)	8:42:53	Elizabeth Edwards (USA)	9:57:07
