= European Cycle Messenger Championships =

Annual competition

The European Cycle Messenger Championships (ECMC) is an annual competition for European bicycle messengers.

The first ECMC was held in Hamburg in 1996. This was originally planned as the 2nd German Cycle Messenger Championships (GCMC/DMFK), but was turned into a European championship due to large participation of Dutch and Danish messengers.

== Championships ==
Year	Host city	Host country
1996	Hamburg	Germany
1997	Amsterdam	Netherlands
1998	Graz	Austria
1999	Gijón	Spain
2000	Freiburg	Germany
2001	Rotterdam	Netherlands
2002	Dublin	Ireland
2003	London	United Kingdom
2004	Warsaw	Poland
2005	Basel	Switzerland
2006	Helsinki	Finland
2007	Oslo	Norway
2008	Eindhoven	Netherlands
2009	Berlin	Germany
2010	Budapest	Hungary
2011	Madrid	Spain
2012	Edinburgh	Scotland
2013	Bern	Switzerland
2014	Stockholm	Sweden
2015	Milan	Italy
2016	Copenhagen	Denmark
2017	Vienna	Austria
2018	Szczecin	Poland
2019	Brussels	Belgium
2020	No event was held due to the COVID-19 pandemic	
2021	Basel	Switzerland
2022	Bremen	Germany
2023	Budapest	Hungary
2024	Lausanne	Switzerland
2025	Salzburg	Austria
2026	Berlin	Germany

== See also ==
- Cycle Messenger World Championships
