= CIVITAS (European Union) =

European Union transportation initiative

CIVITAS is an initiative of the European Union to implement sustainable, clean and (energy) efficient urban transport measures. The initiative is co-ordinated by cities.

== Etymology ==
CIVITAS is an acronym of CIty-VITAlity-Sustainability.

== Chronology ==
- CIVITAS I started in early 2002 (within the Fifth European Community Framework Programme), with 19 cities clustered in 4 demonstration projects.
- CIVITAS II started in early 2005 (within the Sixth Framework Programme), consisting of 17 cities in 4 demonstration projects.
- CIVITAS PLUS started in late 2008 (within the Seventh Framework Programme), with 25 cities in 5 demonstration projects.
- CIVITAS PLUS II started in 2012, with 8 cities in 2 demonstration projects (lab projects).
- CIVITAS 2020 started in 2016, with 17 cities in 3 demonstration projects (lab projects).

== See also ==
- Crossing guard
- Eltis
- Walk Safely to School Day
- Walk to school campaign
- Walk to Work Day
- Walking bus
