= Covenant of Mayors =

European co-operation movement

The Covenant of Mayors is a European co-operation movement involving local and regional authorities. Signatories of the Covenant of Mayors voluntarily commit to increasing energy efficiency and the use of renewable energy sources on their territories. By their commitment, they support the European Union 20% CO_{2} reduction objective to be reached by 2020.

After the European Union climate and energy package was adopted in 2008, the European Commission launched the Covenant of Mayors to endorse and support the efforts deployed by local authorities in the implementation of sustainable energy policies.

== Covenant of Mayors Signatories ==
European local authorities of all sizes – from small villages to capitals and major metropolitan areas – are eligible to sign up as Covenant of Mayors signatories.

Cities, towns and other urban areas have a crucial role to play in mitigating climate change, as they consume three quarters of the energy produced in the European Union and are responsible for a similar share of CO_{2} emissions. Local authorities are also in a position to change citizens' behaviour and address climate and energy questions in a comprehensive manner, notably by reconciling public and private interests and by integrating sustainable energy issues into overall local development goals.

== Formal undertakings ==
To meet the CO_{2} reduction targets they set themselves, signatories commit to a series of steps and agree to report and be monitored on their actions. Within predefined time frames, they formally undertake to fulfil the following:

- Develop adequate administrative structures, including allocation of sufficient human resources, in order to undertake the necessary actions;
- Prepare a Baseline Emission Inventory;
- Submit a Sustainable Energy Action Plan within the year following the official adhesion to the Covenant of Mayors initiative, and including concrete measures leading to at least 20% reduction of CO_{2} emissions by 2020;
- Submit an implementation report at least every second year after submission of their Sustainable Energy Action Plan for evaluation, monitoring and verification purposes

To comply with the crucial necessity of mobilising local stakeholders in the development of the Sustainable Energy Action Plans, signatories also undertake to:

- Share experience and know-how with other local authorities;
- Organise Local Energy Days to raise citizens awareness of sustainable development and energy efficiency;
- Attend or contribute to the Covenant of Mayors annual ceremony, thematic workshops and discussion group meetings;
- Spread the message of the Covenant in the appropriate fora and, in particular, encourage other mayors to join the Covenant.

== Sustainable Energy Action Plans ==
To reach and try to exceed the European Union energy and climate objectives, Covenant of Mayors signatories commit to develop a Sustainable Energy Action Plan (SEAP), within a year following their adhesion to the initiative. This action plan, approved by the municipal council, outlines the activities and measures foreseen by signatories to fulfil their commitments, with corresponding time frames and assigned responsibilities.

Various technical and methodological supporting materials (including the "SEAP Guidebook" and template, reports on existing methodologies and tools, etc.) offer practical guidance and clear recommendations on the whole SEAP development process. Based on the practical experiences of local authorities and developed in close co-operation with the European Commission Joint Research Centre, this support package provides Covenant signatories with key principles and a clear step-by-step approach. All documents are downloadable on the www.eumayors.eu website library.

== Coordination and support ==
=== Covenant Coordinators and Supporters ===
Covenant Signatories do not always possess the adequate tools and resources to prepare a Baseline Emission Inventory, draft the related Sustainable Energy Action Plan and finance the actions featured in the latter. In light of this, provinces, regions, networks and groupings of municipalities have a crucial role to play in helping signatories honour their commitments.

Covenant Coordinators are public authorities from different government levels (national, regional, provincial) which provide strategic guidance to signatories, as well as financial and technical support in the development and implementation of their Sustainable Energy Action Plans. The Commission distinguishes between "Territorial Coordinators", which are sub-national decentralised authorities – including provinces, regions and public groupings of municipalities, and "National Coordinators", which include national public bodies – such as national energy agencies and ministries of energy.

Covenant Supporters are European, national and regional networks and associations of local authorities which leverage their lobbying, communication and networking activities to promote the Covenant of Mayors initiative and support the commitments of its signatories.

=== Covenant of Mayors Office ===
Promotional, technical and administrative assistance is provided on a daily basis to Covenant signatories and stakeholders by the Covenant of Mayors Office (CoMO), managed by a consortium of local and regional authorities' networks, led by Energy Cities and composed of CEMR, Climate Alliance, Eurocities and FEDARENE. Funded by the European Commission, the CoMO is responsible for the overall co-ordination of the initiative.

=== Institutions of the European Union ===
To support the elaboration and implementation the signatories' Sustainable Energy Action Plans, the European Commission has contributed to the development of financial facilities particularly targeting Covenant of Mayors signatories, among which the European Local Energy Assistance (ELENA) facility, set up in co-operation with the European Investment Bank, for large-scale projects, and ELENA-KfW which, established in partnership with the German Group KfW, offers a complementary approach to mobilise sustainable investments of small and medium-sized municipalities.

Alongside the European Commission, the Covenant benefits from full institutional support, including from the Committee of the Regions, which has supported the initiative since its inception. The European Parliament, where the two first signing ceremonies were held; and the European Investment Bank, which assists local authorities in unlocking their investment potential.

=== Joint Research Centre ===
The Joint Research Centre of the European Commission is responsible for providing technical and scientific support to the initiative. It works in close collaboration with the Covenant of Mayors Office to equip signatories with clear technical guidelines and templates to assist delivery of their Covenant of Mayors commitments, as well as to monitor implementation and results.

== See also ==
- C40
- CIVITAS (European Union)
- Climate Action
- Climate change
- Directorate-General for Energy (European Commission)
- Eltis
- Energy conservation
- Energy policy
- European Union
- Framework Programmes for Research and Technological Development
- Intelligent Energy Europe
- Interreg
- Joint Research Centre
- ManagEnergy
- Renewable energy
- Sustainable energy
