= Exercise trends =

General trends of people doing exercise

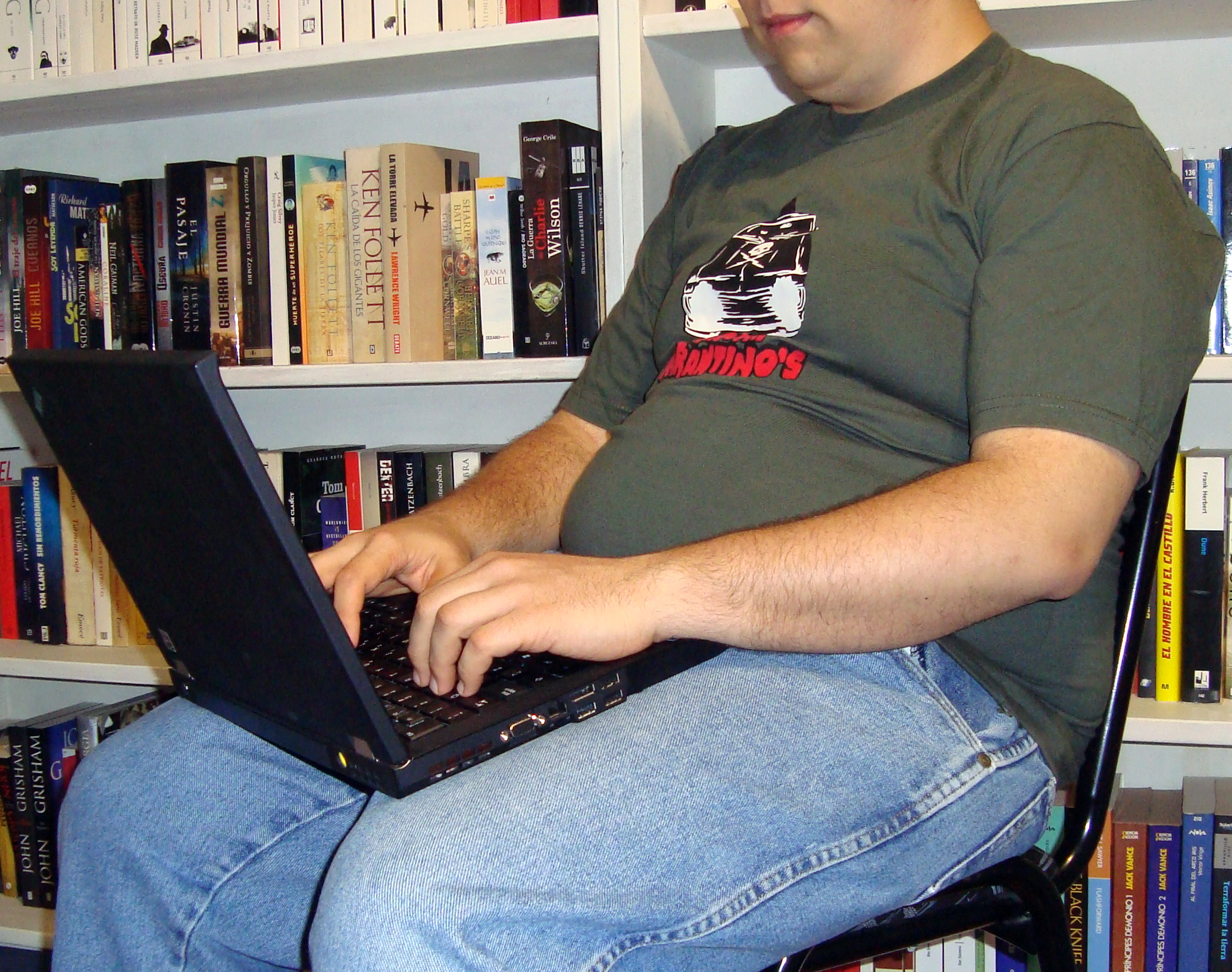
Increases in sedentary behaviors such as overuse of electronics may lead to a decrease of physical activity.

Worldwide there has been a large shift towards less physically demanding work and a more sedentary lifestyle. This has been accompanied by increasing use of mechanized transportation, automobile dependency, a greater prevalence of labor saving technology in the home, and less active recreational pursuits. At least 31% of the world's population does not get sufficient physical exercise. This is true in almost all developed and developing countries, and among children. Some experts refer to sitting as "the new smoking" because of its negative effects on overall health.

These exercise trends are contributing to the rising rates of chronic long-lasting diseases such as: obesity, heart disease, stroke, preventable causes of death, cardiovascular disease, high blood pressure and high cholesterol. Active transport (walking, bicycling, etc.) has been found to be inversely related to obesity in Europe, North America, and Australia. Thus exercise has been associated with a decrease in mortality.

== Causes of lack of exercise ==
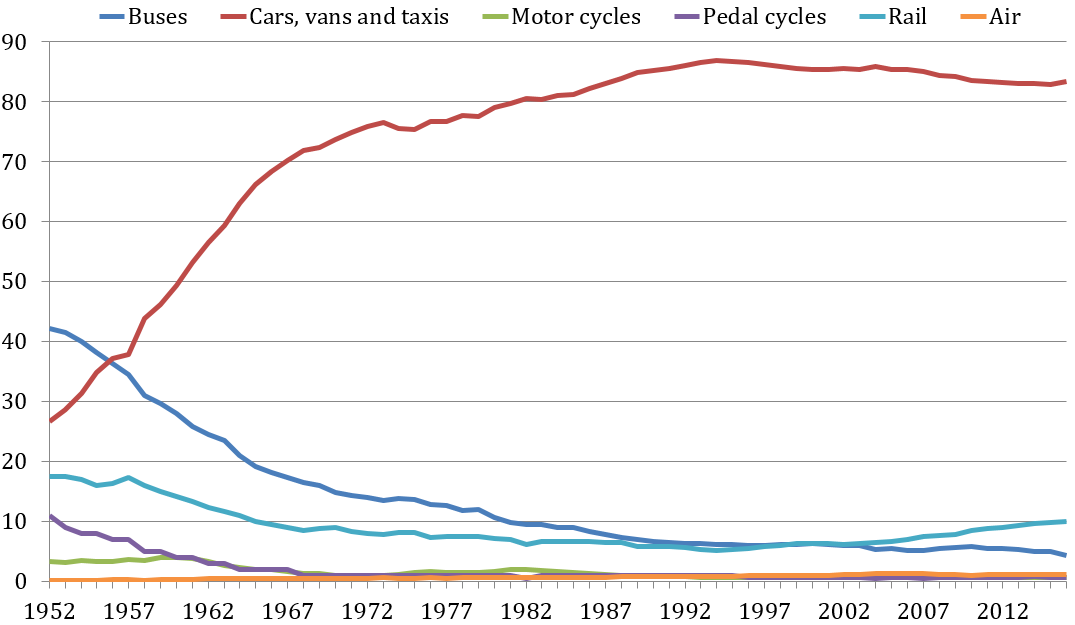
United Kingdom transport modal share from 1952 to 2014, Department for Transport

One of the causes most prevalent in the developing world is urbanization. As more of the population moves to cities, population over-crowding, increased poverty, increased levels of crime, high-volumes of car traffic, low air quality and lack of parks, sidewalks and recreational sports facilities leads to a less active lifestyle.

Physical inactivity is increasing or high among many groups in the population including young people, women, and the elderly.

A 2005 population study in south Brazil showed physical inactivity during leisure time to be more prevalent among females and those living with a partner; with a positive correlation associated with age and number of cigarettes smoked, and a negative correlation (decreased levels of physical inactivity) associated with years of formal education, body mass index, and increasing socioeconomic status.

Studies in children and adults have found an association between the number of hours of television watched and the prevalence of obesity. A 2008 meta analysis found that 63 of 73 studies (86%) showed an increased rate of childhood obesity with increased media exposure, and rates increasing proportionally to time spent watching television.

Another cause in the case of children is that physical activity in activities from self-propelled student transport, physical education, and organized sports is declining in many countries.

== Symptoms ==
Noncommunicable diseases, partly due to a lack of exercise, are currently the greatest public health problem in most countries around the world. Each year at least 1.9 million people die as a result of physical inactivity, which makes inactivity one of the leading preventable causes of death worldwide.

== Countries ==
=== Australia ===
Australian children between 1961 and 2002 have had a marked decline in their aerobic fitness.

=== Canada ===
Obese people are less active than their normal weight counterparts. In Canada, 27.0% of sedentary men are obese as opposed to 19.6% of active men. Lean people are more fidgety than their obese counterparts; this relationship is maintained even if normal weight people eat more or the obese person loses weight.

National data indicates that only 10% of Canadian youth are meeting the guideline for screen time of less than 2 hours per day. As well, although 2/3 of families live close enough for their children to bike or walk to school, only 1/3 report actually walking to school and 80% report never having cycled to school.

=== Asia and China ===
A study from China found urbanization reduced daily energy expenditure by about 300–400 kcal and going to work by car or bus reduced it by a further 200 kcal. Rapid urbanization and modernization in China, particularly between 1991 and 2006, have been correlated with increasing sedentary activity and lifestyles, leading to a significant decline in physical activity levels.

A rapid decline in physical activity has occurred between the 1980s and the 2000s. The decline in physical activity is attributed to increasing technology in the workplace and changing leisure activities. In 1989 65% of Chinese had jobs that required heavy labor. This decreased to 51% in the year 2000.

Among Asian children between 1917 and 2003 little change has been seen in power and speed however endurance has decreased substantially in the last 10–15 years.

=== Finland ===
In Finland leisure-time physical activity has increased, while occupational and commuting physical activity has decreased from 1972 to 2002. Leisure-time physical activity increased from 66% (1972) to 77% (2002) in men and from 49% (1972)to 76% (2002) in women. Physically demanding work decreased from 60% (1972) to 38% (2002) in men and from 47% (1972) to 25% (2002) in women. Daily commuting activity decreased from 30% (1972) to 10% (2002) in men and from 34% (1972) to 22% (2002) in women.

=== Netherlands ===
As of 2007, walking and cycling as a means of transport in the Netherlands has been stable since 1994. The average Dutch citizen in the year 2007 walked 240 km (150 mi) and cycled 908 km (564 mi) per year.

Personal training is gaining more and more popularity in the Netherlands in the last 15 years. A personal trainer is a trainer certified to have a varying degree of knowledge of general fitness involved in exercise prescription and instruction. They motivate clients by setting goals and providing feedback to clients.

Obstacle training centrums are very popular. An obstacle course is a series of challenging physical obstacles an individual or a team need to complete while being timed. Obstacle courses can include running, climbing, jumping, crawling, swimming, and balancing elements with the aim of testing speed and endurance. Sometimes a course involves mental tests.

=== South America ===
Over 60% of the population of Brazil, Chile, and Peru do not meet the recommended levels of physical activity needed to maintain health. A study of a southern Brazilian population found that >80% of the population was physically inactive.

=== Sweden ===
A study of Swedish males found a significant decrease in total physical exercise even though recreational exercise has increased. This was due to a decrease in work place exercise and physical exercise in transportation.

=== United States ===
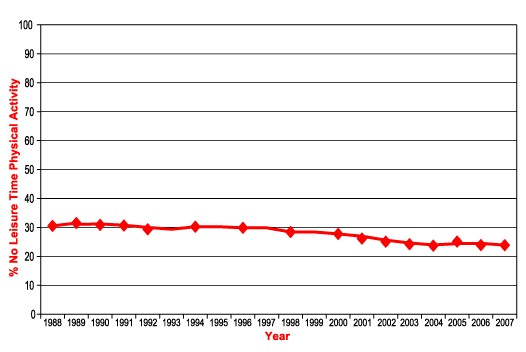
Graph showing the trend in the proportion of the U.S. population which reported no leisure-time physical activity, 1988 - 2007

Americans have become less physically active overall between 1955 and 2005. While the rate of leisure-time physical activity has not changed significantly there has been a decrease in work-related activity, human powered transportation, activity in the home, and increasing sedentary lifestyle. During 2000 and 2005, the number of adults who were never physically active increased from 9.4% to 10.3% while the number who were engaged in the highest level of physical activity decreased from 18.7% to 16.7%. Pertaining to leisure-time physical activity, people involved in no activity increased from 38.5% to 40.0% while those who spent most of their day sitting increased from 36.8% to 39.9%.

In 2000, the CDC estimated that more than 40% of the US population was sedentary, another 30% was active but not sufficiently and less than 30% had an adequate level of physical activity. There has been a trend toward decreased physical activity in part due to increasingly mechanized forms of work, changing modes of transportation, and increasing urbanization. Obesity rates have increased in relation to expanding suburbs. This has been attributed to increased time spent commuting, leading to less exercise and less meal preparation at home. In the time between 1983 and 1990 the number of trips taken by foot decreased from 9% down to 7%. Driving one's children to school has become increasingly popular. In the USA the proportion of children who walk or bike to school declined between 1969 (42%) and 2001 (16%) resulting in less exercise.

=== UK ===
In England, both walking and cycling have declined since 1975 being replaced by motorized transport. The average British citizen in the year 2005 walked 317 km (197 mi) per year, a fall of 106 km (66 mi) since 1975.

== See also ==
- Sedentary lifestyle
- Fitness culture
- Professional fitness coach
- Physical fitness
- Nutritionist
