= Cycling organization =

Cycling organization may refer to:

- Bicycle user group, activist association that works to promote the use of bicycles and the safety of cyclists.
- Cycling club, sports group that promotes cycling as a sport.
