= FEDARENE =

Premier European network of regional and local organisations

- Founded: 1990
- Type: International non-profit association
- Purpose: Sustainable energy and Energy Efficiency, Environment, Land Planning, Regional Policy, Mobility and Transport, Sustainable Development.
- Location: Brussels
- Region served: European Union
- Method: Exchange of experiences and transfer of know-how, information, lobbying.
- Members: 80
- Key people: Julije DOMAC
- Website: www.fedarene.org

FEDARENE (an acronym for European Federation of Agencies and Regions for Energy and Environment) is the premier European network of regional and local organisations which implement, co-ordinate and facilitate energy and environment policies. Regional and local agencies, regional governments and departments working in these fields, are represented in FEDARENE.

FEDARENE, an international non-profit association set up in 1990 at the initiative of 6 European regions, now has 80 member regions from 23 European countries.

== Background ==
FEDARENE was founded in 1990 at the initiative of Rhône-Alpes, Provence-Alpes-Côte-d’Azur, Wallonia, País Vasco, Aquitaine and Nord-Pas-de-Calais, who wanted to strengthen the local and regional dimension in energy and environmental policies at European level.

Thus, as described in the FEDARENE statutes:

- "By effective management, investment, and increasing awareness it is possible to create a system which is more energy efficient and less polluting;"
- "Only an approach based on close proximity with consumers, and on both quantitative and qualitative understanding of their needs, can lead to efficient energy management;"
- "The Region covers a sufficiently large economic area and is of a sufficiently high administrative level to deal with the issues of planning, economic development and the environment"
- "The Regions of Europe share the same problems in protecting the environment and in managing energy but their diverse means, geographic situations and cultures have given rise to a multiplicity of solutions"
- "Whereas the exchange of experience between regions reinforces European economic, social and environmental cohesion;"

The European Federation of Regional Energy and Environment Agencies was created on 6 June 1990. The members wish to give this federation the status of an international association within the scope of Heading III of the law of 27 June 1921;

== Activities ==
The missions of the European Federation of Agencies and Regions for Energy and Environment are to facilitate the development of interregional exchanges, partnerships and cooperation; to help the European regions to develop their capacity to take actions and to represent and promote the regional and local dimension in EU energy and environment debates.

FEDARENE is currently involved in several European projects. Among them there are Energy Efficiency Watch4, OPENGELA, C-Track 50, ManagEnergy. FEDARENE is also member of the Covenant of Mayors Office.

FEDARENE was involved in a great number of other, finished European projects in various fields : biogas (Biogas-Regions), biomethane (Biomethane-Regions), regional greenhouse gas observatories (Climact-Regions), sustainable rural development (SERVE).

Climact REGIONS project also spawned Energee-Watch, the European network of regional observatories energy and greenhouse gas. FEDARENE is currently responsible for the coordination of the network and has made a valuable contribution in its creation.

== Internal structure ==
The board of administration is composed of 16 members of which a president, a general secretary, 13 vice-presidents, a secretary and a treasurer. The board's members are representatives of the following regions/provinces: Alba (RO), Auvergne-Rhône-Alpes (FR), Berlin (DE), Castile and León (ES), North West Croatia (HR), Ile-de-France (FR), Central Finland (FI), Aegean Islands (GR), Severn Wye (UK), Liguria (IT), Podravje (SI), Southeast Sweden (SE), Tipperary (IE), Upper-Austria (AT), Wallonia (BE).

== See also ==
- European Union Regional policy
- Energy policy of the European Union
- Renewable energy in the European Union
- European Climate Change Programme
- Directorate-General for Mobility and Transport (European Commission)
- Directorate-General for the Environment (European Commission)
- Committee of the Regions
- European Parliament
- European Environment Agency
