= Walking audit =

Assessment of pedestrian accessibility

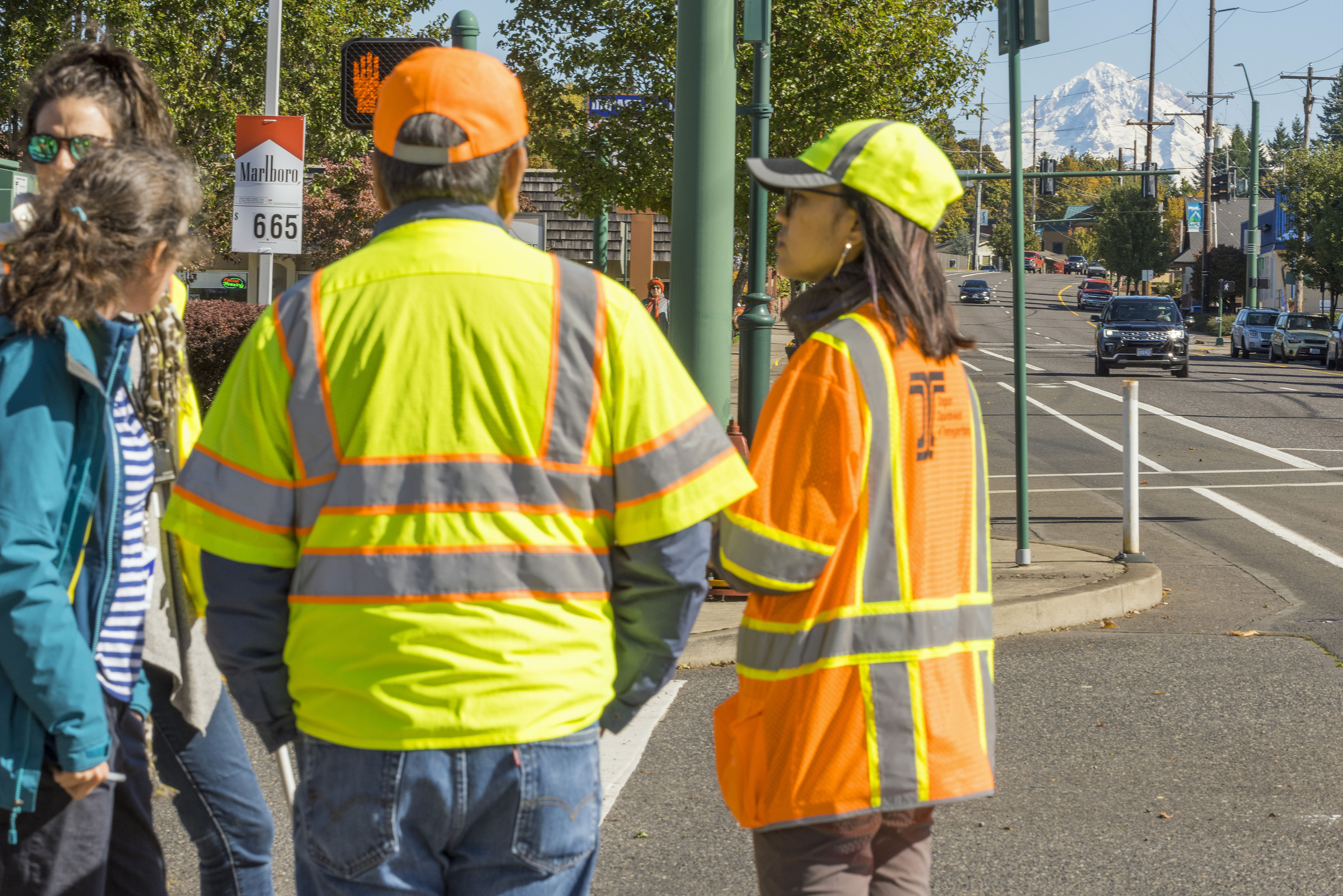
The Oregon Department of Transportation undertaking a walking audit of a neighborhood

A walking audit is an assessment of the walkability or pedestrian access of an external environment. Walking audits are often undertaken in street environments to consider and promote the needs of pedestrians as a form of transport. They can be undertaken by a range of different stakeholders including:

- Local community groups
- Transport planners / engineers
- Urban designers
- Local police officers
- Local politicians / councilors

Walking audits often collect both quantitative and qualitative data on the walking environment.

Similarly to a walking audit, a cycling audit or bicycle audit makes an assessment of the cyclability or cyclist access to an area. They may be performed by a bicycle user group, local government or other stakeholders.

== Pedestrian Environment Review System ==
The Pedestrian Environment Review System (PERS) is the most developed and widely used walking audit tool available. PERS is “a systematic process to assess the pedestrian environment within a framework that promotes objectivity”. The environment is reviewed from the end user perspective of a vulnerable pedestrian. PERS consists of:

- An on-street audit process
- A geographic information system (GIS) software package to consolidate, map and display results

A PERS walking audit collects both quantitative and qualitative data on six types of facility in the street environment:

- Links (footways, footbridges, subways)
- Crossings
- Routes
- Public transport waiting areas (bus stops, tram stops, taxi ranks)
- Public spaces (parks and squares)
- Interchange spaces (between different modes of transport)

Each facility is rated on a seven-point scale (-3 to +3) for different parameters such as effective width, dropped kerbs, permeability, or personal security. PERS also rates disabled peoples access. These PERS ratings are linked to Red/Amber/Green (RAG) colour-coding. The PERS software allows users to analyse and display walkability data using GIS maps, charts and quick win recommendation lists.

PERS was originally developed in 2001 by TRL and London Borough of Bromley. The software tool (PERS 1) was designed to allow transport professionals and community groups to quickly and cost-effectively assess and rate the walkability of local streets and recommend improvements for pedestrians. This version of the tool assessed Links, Crossings, and Routes. In 2005 Transport for London and TRL co-developed PERS 2 which expanded the original system to include Public Transport Waiting Areas (PTWA), Public Spaces and Interchange Spaces. In 2009 transport for London and TRL further developed the tool into PERS 3 which included a built-in GIS mapping tool and the ability to add photographs and georeferences of quick wins (low cost, easy to implement physical improvements). PERS 3 also has the added functionality of automatically generate quick-win recommendation work lists for Highway work crews.

The PERS tool has been used by organisations all over the world and has been used extensively in London to assess over 200 km of the street network.

== Using walking audits to make a business case ==
Research undertaken by the Commission for Architecture and the Built Environment (CABE) have used the PERS walking audit method to show: "how we can calculate the extra financial value that good street design contributes, over average or poor design".

The study found a direct link between an increase in PERS scores (and therefore an increase in the quality of a street for pedestrians) and residential house prices. The study demonstrates how PERS can be used to show how: "clear financial benefits can be calculated from investing in better quality street design".

== See also ==
- Accessibility
- Bicycle user group
- Environmental planning
- Pedestrian crossing
- Street reclamation
- Student transport
- Transportation planning
- Urban green space
- Urban planning
- Walkability
- Walking bus
- Walking tour
