= Energy Cities =

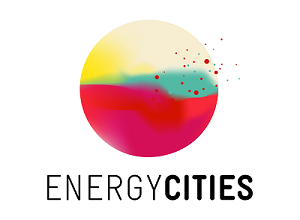
- Founded: 1990, Besançon, France
- Founder: Gérard Magnin
- Type: Network of cities
- Purpose: Building, Energy Efficiency, Energy, Renewables, Transport, Urbanism
- Location: Besançon, Brussels
- Region served: Europe
- Method: Lobbying, Research, Innovation
- Members: 180 member cities
- Official language: English, Français
- Executive Director: Claire Roumet
- Staff: 25
- Website: www.energy-cities.eu

Energy Cities is the European Association of local authorities in energy transition. It represents 1000 towns and cities in 30 countries.

In 2023, the city of Leuven (BE) took over the Presidency of the association, succeeding Heidelberg (DE), which held the presidency from 2017 to 2023.

Energy Cities was established as an association of European local authorities in 1990 to put all this into practice. The association premises are located in Brussels (BE) and Besançon (FR). A part of the team works in Budapest (HU), Offenburg (DE), Freiburg im Breisgau (DE) and Paris (FR).

== Board of directors ==
The Board of Directors of the association is represented by the 10 European cities:

Municipality	Country
Leuven	BE
Heidelberg	DE
Križevci	HR
Modena	IT
Munchen	DE
Nantes	FR
Porto	PT
Valencia	ES
Växjö	SE
Vienna	AT

== Presidency of Energy Cities ==
- From 2023 City of Leuven (BE), represented by Mohamed Ridouani, Mayor of Leuven
- 2005-2023 City of Heidelberg (DE), represented by Eckart Würzner, Deputy Mayor of Heidelberg
- 2000-2005 City of Odense (DK), represented by Søren Møller, Deputy Mayor of Odense
- 1997-2000 City of Barcelona (ES), represented by Pep Puig, Municipal Councillor in Barcelona
- 1994-1997 City of Besançon (FR), represented by Robert Schwint, Mayor of Besançon
- 1990-1994 Robert Schwint, Mayor of Besançon

== See also ==
- Covenant of Mayors
