= Gérard Magnin =

Gérard Magnin is the founder of Energy Cities.

He was placed as a director on the board of EDF in 2014 under request of the French government, but resigned in 2016 prior to a vote that supported Hinkley Point C nuclear reactor which he called 'very risky'.
