= School run =

Transporting students to/from school

These school road markings outside Barking Abbey School in Barking show that parking during term time is illegal

The school run is the current modern practice of parents taking their children to school by car. Many parents park their cars in school car parks and driveways to drop off and pick up their children at the appropriate times.

== Background ==
In the past it was normal for children to walk to school, either on their own, with friends, or accompanied by an adult. Walking to school by primary school pupils in the UK fell from 61% in 1992/4 to 50% in 2004. In recent years walking to school has become less common as more and more students are dropped off at school by parents using cars, sometimes in a rota with other parents.

Reasons for this trend include:

- In many cases both parents work and do not have time to walk their children to school, and do not know any other parents who have the time either.
- Even if the children are old enough to walk on their own (or cycle), most parents are worried that something may happen to them, such as kidnapping or a car accident, partly due to media coverage of isolated cases.
- Often there is no convenient bus service, and the distance is too far for walking

The risk of children being run over near their schools is much higher than in the past due to parents driving their own children to school and parking in unsafe places near the school gates. It is not unusual to see drivers parking their cars in bus stops, on pedestrian crossings or facing the wrong way, with children getting in or out of the car.

== Problems arising from 'the school run' ==
Some streets near schools now have a 20 mph (32 km/h) speed limit operating when the children are about, though traffic congestion often necessitates a lower speed.

With the increase in a choice of schools, children may have to travel further and are more likely to require a bus or car ride.

It is claimed that the school run is responsible for a large amount of the traffic problems in the morning rush hour.

The decreasing amount of exercise and associated increase in obesity are also partly blamed on the school run. To combat this, many schools have started arrangements to encourage children to walk to school, whilst mitigating the possible dangers. An example is the "walking school bus", an organised group of children and volunteer parents walking to school.

The school run has become a popular target for some politicians and campaigners against the use of cars for journeys which could be better walked or cycled. One of the campaigns promoting this alternative is the walk to school campaign.

Some schools are now designed with winding drop-off lanes to accommodate long queues of private vehicles, making it more difficult to access the school by bike or foot.

== See also ==
- Student transport
