= Pedestrian Council of Australia =

Lobby group promoting walking

The Pedestrian Council of Australia Limited (PCA) is road safety lobby group which seeks to promote health and safety through walking (or wheelchair use). The founder, CEO and spokesperson is Harold Scruby. Scruby has been the CEO since the incorporation of the PCA in 1996. The company owns and manages National Walk Safely to School Day and Walk to Work Day.

The NRMA and the Roads & Traffic Authority jointly funded the incorporation of the Pedestrian Council of Australia and contributed to writing its objectives and structure.

In 1995 the PCA was instrumental in implementing the first 40km/h zone on a main road in Australia, and also lobbied for a 40km/h speed limit in the Sydney central business district. The PCA also supports 30km/h zones.

Scruby is often quoted in Australian media on matters relating to road safety. The PCA achieves a high media profile by choosing issues and taking a controversial position, such as calling for more point-to-point and mobile speed cameras, and increased fines for pedestrians. Concerns about the use of e-mobility devices was presented by the ABC as a "significant issue for pedestrian safety, based solely on a comment by Mr Scruby", resulting in an ABC Ombudsman investigation finding a breach of standards and the issue of a correction.

== Criticism ==
=== Membership and Governance ===
Membership of the Pedestrian Council of Australia Limited is by invitation of the Board of Directors. The group has received criticism for requiring approval from Scruby to join.

The Pedestrian Council of Australia has faced persistent criticism as the vehicle of an individual. The Sydney Morning Herald stated the PCA has been described by its detractors as "Harold and his fax machine". ABC Media Watch published a segment on the PCA with Paul Barry stating "essentially it's a one-man band, run by its CEO and Chairman Harold Scruby." The PCA complained to Media Watch over the term "one man band", and Media Watch added a note in the transcript that the PCA is a registered charity with a board of directors.

A 2005 letter claimed that while the PCA is a limited company (with Scruby as President and CEO with another seven registered directors) and anyone can join, they cannot have voting rights and there are no meetings with any input from anyone but those eight. Scruby stated this is to prevent such groups as Four-wheel drive owners from taking over the organisation.

After publishing a letter describing the PCA as having just one official, Pearls and Irritations published a correction.

The organisation continues to receive funding from many government sources.

=== ABC Ombudsman’s Office complaints ===
In 2025, the ABC published factually incorrect quotes from Harold Scruby of the Pedestrian Council of Australia, which resulted in complaints to the ABC Ombudsman's Office and the publication of a correction by the ABC.

The ABC Ombudsman's Office received two complaints regarding a statement attributed to the Pedestrian Council of Australia, "which implied that eight deaths in Queensland involving e-scooters were pedestrian fatalities, when those killed were in fact e-scooter riders."

As a result of the lack of fact-checking, the ABC article "presented a perspective which inaccurately conflated legitimate e-mobility device safety concerns with an increase in pedestrian deaths, and amplified these concerns to the exclusion of actual likely causes, such as driver behaviour and car design."

The ABC Ombudsman's Office, along with the two complainants, were able to identify only one pedestrian death in Australia to date caused by an e-scooter collision and one by a collision with a modified e-bike.

Concerns about the use of e-mobility devices was presented by the ABC as a significant pedestrian safety issue, "based solely on a comment by Mr Scruby". The ABC "presented factual content in a way that materially misleads the audience, in breach of standard 2.2" and the "ABC did not make reasonable efforts to ensure that material facts are accurate, in breach of standard 2.1."

== Origin of the Pedestrian Council of Australia ==
While Scruby identified his time on Mosman Council's traffic committee as the "catalyst" for forming the PCA the concept "could conceivably have been sown in his mind almost a decade earlier". In 1986 Harold Scruby was driving a car and struck Dr. Peter Stewart in Mosman (who was jogging) and was charged with wanton driving. The charge against Scruby, who was a Council Alderman at the time, was later cleared - the magistrate criticised Dr Stewart for inconsistencies in his evidence, that he had broken the law by not stopping before he left the kerb and ran across the road rather than walked. Scruby said the experience was a "harrowing time" and stated "It certainly made me realise that each party on the road had a responsibility".

A court was told the crash followed a verbal altercation. Dr Stewart told a court that Scruby yelled at him, saying of joggers "You think you own the road". Scruby allegedly followed him to the next intersection, and when the jogger was halfway across the road allegedly "accelerated a bit" before striking the jogger and breaking his right knee. A bystander drove a van to block Scruby's car as they did not think the driver was going to stop. Scruby told the court he had not intended to hit the jogger.

Scruby was "determined no one else should live with the same nightmare" and asked police to bring charges against Olympian Tani Ruckle for jogging on the road in 1991 as "roads are for cars not people".

Scruby worked with management at the NRMA, Roads & Traffic Authority and the New South Wales Police Force to establish a pedestrian advocacy organisation. These organisations funded a review by Keys Young consultants which found the need for such an organisation.

== Campaigns and Views ==
=== Distracted pedestrians ===
In 2024, Scruby claimed 'Pedestrian zombies' "are responsible for causing a lot of road trauma."

The PCA has called for the government to fine pedestrians for crossing the road while not paying attention. The fine was proposed to be "at least double that of regular jaywalking" in 2011, $150 in 2014 and $200 in 2016, 2018 and 2024. Scruby stated in 2016 police may not have the time or resources to enforce this, but that "council rangers could".

The penalty was proposed to be called "cross road while distracted". Pedestrians would be able to be booked while crossing on a green pedestrian light. The suggestion has "divided opinion". The PCA said pedestrians distracted using mobile phones or noise-cancelling headphones should face a $200 fine.

Scruby has stated "In reality, the road toll costs us $30 billion per year, which everyone has to pay for," and "We are saying that the people who are causing these problems should be the ones contributing to the cost, not the average population." On injury costs, Scruby has also stated "Deaths are cheap but pedestrian injuries are twice the cost of vehicle occupant injuries"

Scruby has stated "We want to know why they call them smartphones when people using them are so dumb."

The PCA has run advertisements showing people with lamb heads using their gadgets while crossing the road at a red light, and including the text "Lambs to the slaughter, wait for the green". In 2017, the PCA released an advertisement warning against pedestrians being distracted around roads. Scruby stated that mobile device manufacturers have a "moral and corporate responsibility" to put warnings on their devices. NSW Police said it would support laws banning pedestrians using iPods and mobile phones while crossing the road.

Recent peer reviewed evidence has found having a cellphone in one's hand reduces the probability of crossing on red.

The victim blaming view of the PCA has been criticised, with a petition calling for the replacement of the leadership claiming "Harold Scruby and his "Pedestrian Council" largely focus on only two: punitive measures to change pedestrian behaviour, and educating pedestrians to change their behaviour." Victoria Walks explains that responses to pedestrian road trauma often focus on the behaviour of people walking rather than drivers, who are often at fault, or the road environment, and that focusing on the behaviour of victims tends to result in victim blaming.

The PCA claims that children "do not have the physical or cognitive skills to cross roads on their own until they are 12".

=== Car Parking ===
The PCA was criticised for the chairman's usage of the SnapSendSolve app to report parking violations. Harold Scruby stated "I was not dobbing anyone; I was using Snap Send Solve".

=== Automobile Advertising ===
Complaints from the PCA have resulted in several ads showing vehicles at speed (in controlled conditions) being banned from Australian television, following his complaints to the Australian Advertising Standards Bureau. It is suggested that this is a result of a few individuals taking advantage of the system, rather than reflecting a common view in the wider community. The PCA has also called for a major tourism event in Adelaide (the Supercars Championship round) to be banned, due to the theory that it encourages speeding. It has also proposed that mp3 players be banned for drivers and for the manufacturers to place warnings on their packaging. The Drift Mode of the Ford Focus RS has also been the campaigned against by the PCA, despite drivers being clearly notified that the mode is for racetrack use only. The NRMA also argued that argued that Drift Mode encourages illegal activity. These positions have been described by critics as nanny state behaviour.

=== Bike Riders ===
Several anti-bicycle proposals have been put forward by the PCA: banning bicycles from shared use paths, imposing a 10 km/h (6 mph) speed limit on bicycles and requiring bicycle riders to purchase third-party insurance.

Scruby has claimed "Cyclists are a protected species" and "When are they going to stop listening to this vociferous lobby of Bicycle New South Wales, which represents 2% of road users?".

The PCA and Harold Scruby have called for governments to halt construction of shared paths citing legal advice. Scruby has said "shared bike paths, such as the Glebe foreshore, were a "farce"" and that they "should be abolished immediately."

As a witness from the PCA in an inquiry, Scruby believes "in a perfect world" that "people should be licensed to ride a bicycle" and that bicycles should be registered.
