= Pace Car Program =

Pace Car Programs are initiatives that aim to reduce traffic speeds and encourage safe driving in neighborhoods and cities in the United States and Canada. Willing drivers register an intention to abide by a safe driving code.

== Origin ==
David Engwicht worked with Boise, Idaho to create the first Pace Car Program, "a citizen-based initiative" which has been implemented across the country in cities such as Salt Lake City, Santa Cruz, and Boulder.

== Registration ==
The Federal Highway Administration describes the Pace Car scheme in these terms: "Resident pace car drivers agree to drive courteously, at or below the speed limit, and follow other traffic laws. Programs usually require interested residents to register as a pace car driver, sign a pledge to abide by the rules, and display a sticker on their vehicle."

== Pace Car Program cities ==
- Baltimore, Maryland
- Calgary, Alberta
- Columbus, Ohio
- Cranford, New Jersey
- Durham, North Carolina
- Edmonton, Alberta
- El Cerrito, California
- Gettysburg, Pennsylvania
- Greensboro, North Carolina
- Greenwich, Connecticut
- Hinsdale, Illinois
- New Haven, Connecticut
- Northampton, Massachusetts
- San Leandro, California
- Rochester, New York
- Walnut Creek, California
- Washington, D.C.
- West Allis, Wisconsin

== Benefits ==
Benefits of Pace Car Programs have been described as follows:

- “Pace Car helps slow traffic”
- “The Pace Car magnet communicates your intentions to other drivers as you model courtesy and safe driving
- "As more people consider walking and biking to be good options, traffic is reduced, and our streets become safer for everyone”
- “It puts the responsibility to drive responsibly back on us – the motorists – instead of on our government the police or the traffic engineers. It doesn’t require physical traffic calming structures such as speed bumps and chicanes. This not only saves money, but also is easier for emergency vehicles.”
- “Speeding takes a heavy toll. In 2000, it was a contributing factor in 29% of the nation's fatal accidents, wrecks that killed 12,350 people, according to the National Highway Traffic Safety Administration. More than 20% of those accidents occurred where posted speed limits were 35 mph or less. "Even modestly higher speeds can spell the difference between life and death for a pedestrian struck by a vehicle," Scott says. "The force of impact on a human body is one-third greater at 35 mph than at 30 mph."”

== Studies ==
Residential studies in Columbia, Missouri have determined that Pace Car Programs have reduced speed limits from 30 mph to 25 mph. The Transportation Laboratory estimates "that each one mph reduction in average traffic speed provided a reduction of 6% in vehicle accidents for urban main roads and residential roads"
