= Walking bus =

Chaperoned student group on foot

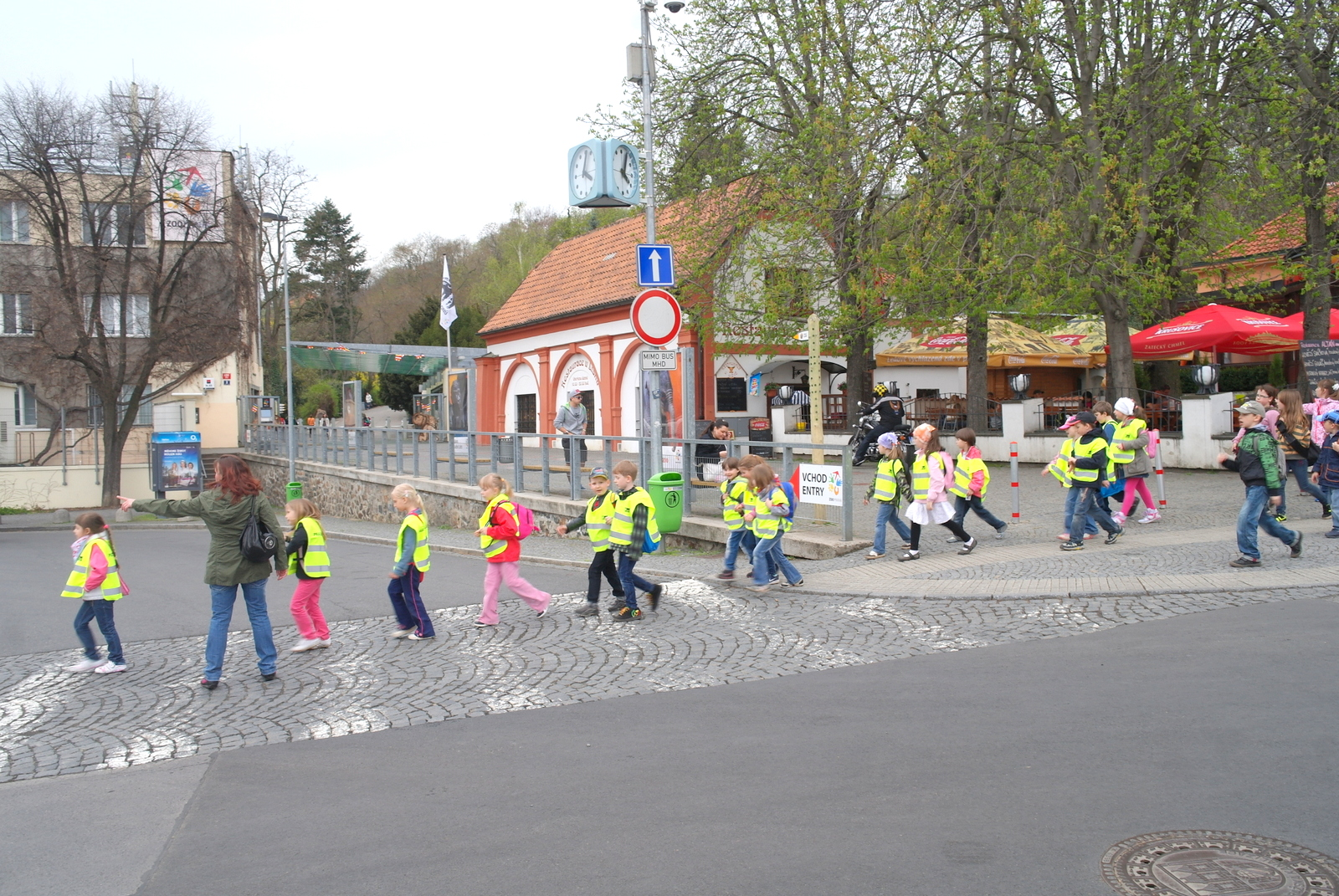
A walking bus of children passing the entrance to the Prague Zoo

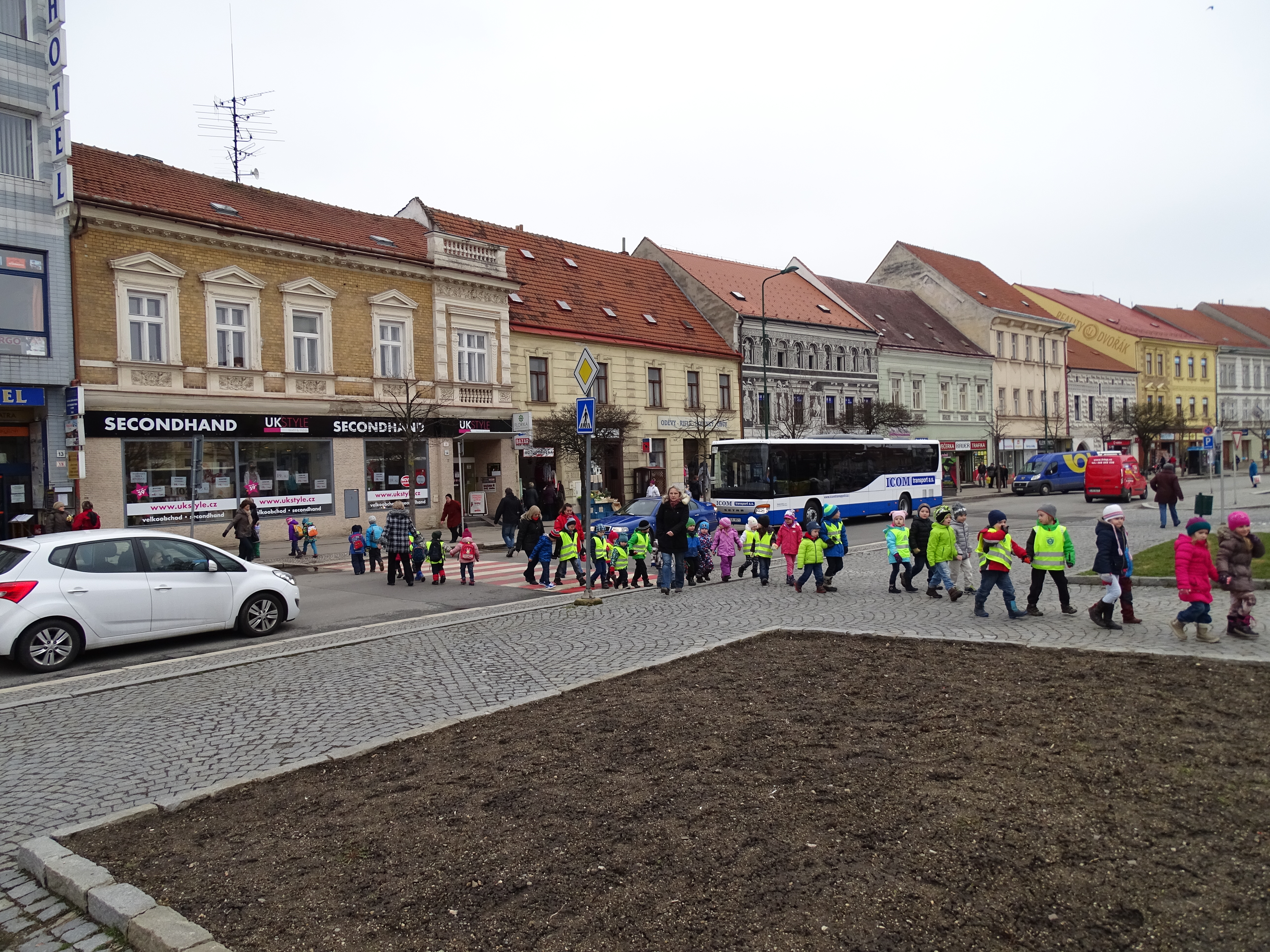
A walking bus in Czechia

A walking bus (or walking school bus) is a form of student transport for young schoolchildren who, chaperoned typically by two adults (a "driver" leads and a "conductor" follows), walk in a train-like procession. The children may walk to school along a set route, with some similarities to a school bus route, with designated "bus stops" and "pick up times" at which they pick up and "drop off" schoolmates.

== History ==
In Britain a group of schoolchildren walking together in a long line of pairs on an activity without stops or pickups, escorted by teachers, has been referred to as a crocodile since at least 1870. The concept of the walking bus as a way to travel to school was first introduced in Japan not later than 1962. Australian transport activist David Engwicht is often given credit for inventing the WSB system in the 1990s. It was introduced in the United Kingdom in 1998 by Hertfordshire County Council, first used by pupils of Wheatfields Junior School in St Albans.

Walking buses have remained popular in the United Kingdom, often for school trips rather than travelling to school, and have recently gained a level of popularity elsewhere in Europe, North America and New Zealand. Proponents of walking buses say that its aims are to:

- Encourage physical activity by teaching children the skills to walk safely, how to identify safe routes to school, and the benefits of walking
- Raise awareness of the extent of a community's walkability and where improvements can be made
- Raise concern for the environment
- Reduce crime and take back neighborhoods for people on foot
- Reduce traffic congestion, pollution, and speed near schools
- Share valuable time with local community leaders, parents, and children

Escorts and/or children on some walking buses are encouraged to wear brightly-coloured jackets or waistcoats. This has led to criticism that the walking bus is too regimented, and fails to achieve its original purpose of improving children's independent mobility. David Engwicht, whose 1992 book "Reclaiming our Cities and Towns" is credited by some as the origin of the Walking School Bus concept in New South Wales, has since stated that "The moment the Walking Bus turns into an official program, it creates some significant difficulties, particularly in litigious and risk-averse cultures."

In Auckland, New Zealand, as of November 2007, one hundred schools ran 230 Walking School Buses with over 4,000 children and 1,500 adults participating. As of 2023 the largest single walking bus according to the Guinness Book of Records had 1,905 participants, on 9 November 2012 in Newmarket, Suffolk.

== Public health ==
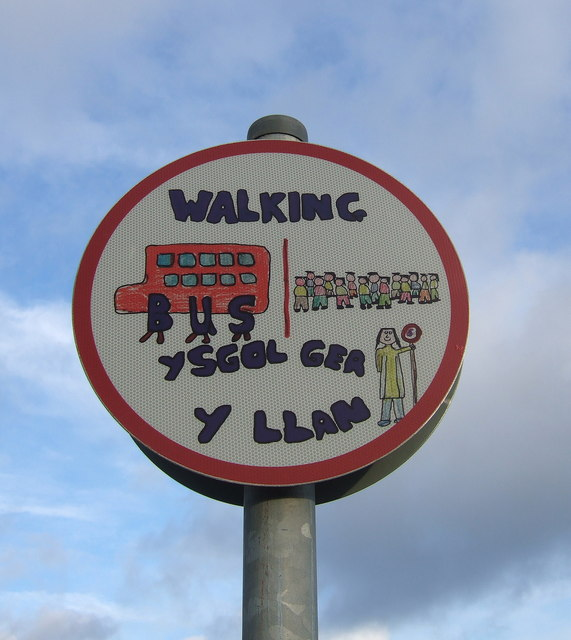
Walking bus stop sign in Letterston, Wales. (The Welsh language text is the name of the school.)

The walking school bus can help to reduce childhood obesity rates by increasing active transportation to school. The American Public Health Association cites that participation in active transportation to school has reduced by a third in the last 40 years. This reduction has coincided with an increase in childhood obesity rates. The Centers for Disease Control and Prevention (CDC), in the USA, report that the prevalence of obesity among children has doubled and among adolescents has quadrupled in the past 30 years. In 2012, 18% of children and 21% of adolescents were obese.

According to the Safe Routes to School National Partnership, walking one mile to and from school each day is two-thirds of the recommended sixty minutes of physical activity a day. In addition to the potential health benefits, walking to school can help children arrive at school safely, on time, and ready to learn. A walking school bus study also found that participants had a 2% better attendance rate than non-participants. Another benefit is the positive association between physical activity and improved academic performance. In a study by the CDC, they found that with a minimum of 60 minutes a day there were increases in academic behavior, cognitive skills and attitudes. The communities that support walking buses may see reduced congestion around school grounds. The walking bus is a non-polluting and sustainable transport alternative to cars and buses. In regard to the safety of the walking bus, the section about Safe Routes to School below goes into more detail about improvements being made to increase the safety of commuting pedestrians.

The built environment plays the biggest role in whether or not a community is walkable. The built environment consists of the human-made surroundings that affect one's life; including the availability and quality of sidewalks, crosswalks and parks, the amount of traffic and proximity to schools/parks/shops, etc. These factors determine the walkability of an area.

Walkability has been shown to be closely tied to childhood obesity. One study found that “the chances of a child being obese or overweight were 20-60 percent higher among children in neighborhoods where it was not safe to walk around or where there were no sidewalks.” In addition, children in neighborhoods with sidewalks and safe places to cross the street are more likely to be physically active than children living in neighborhoods without those safe infrastructure elements.

The walking bus depends on a walkable and safe built environment. Safe Routes to School is US government program that funds improvements in the built environment near schools.

== Support for the walking bus ==
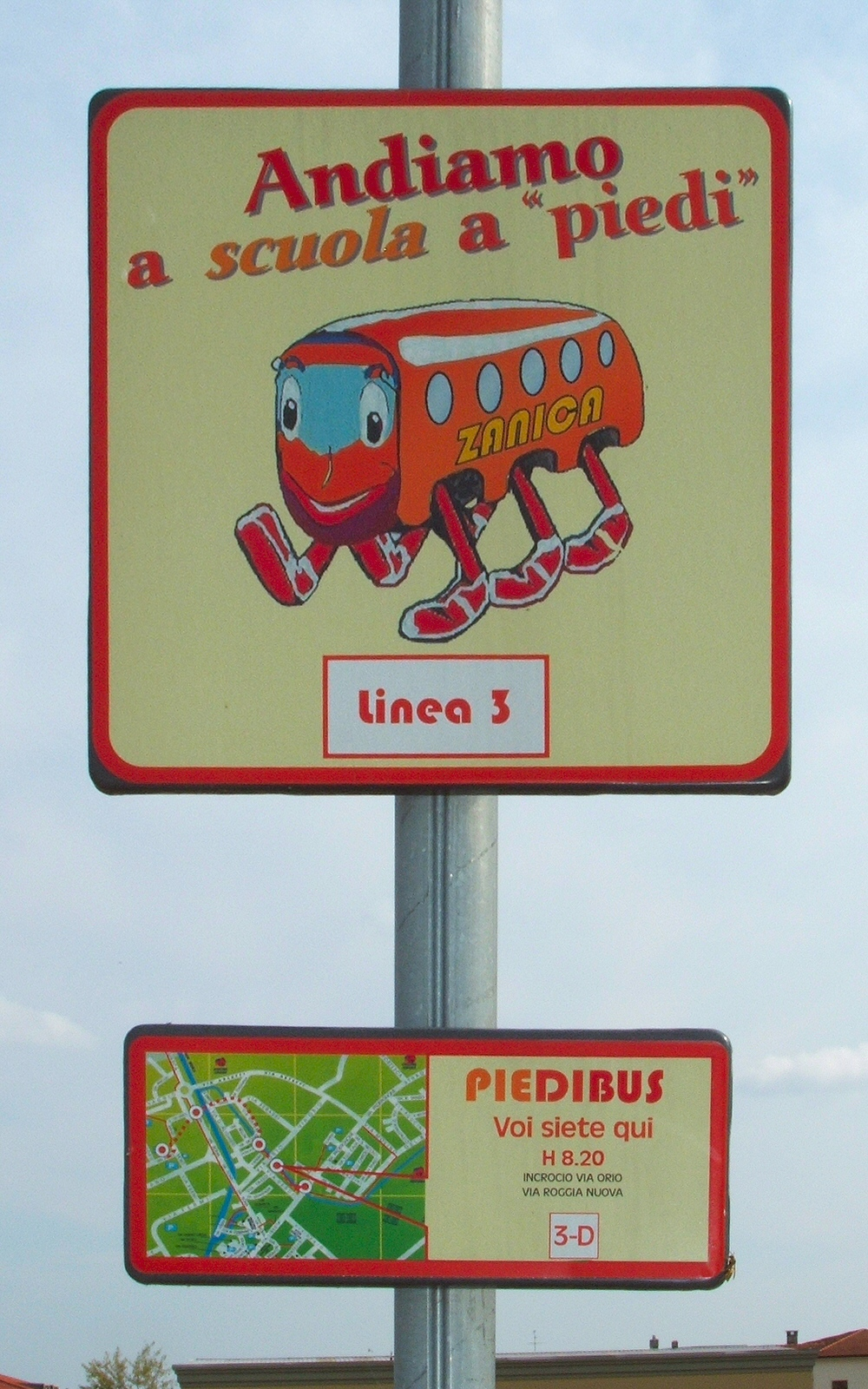
Sign for a walking bus stop in the Italian city of Zanica

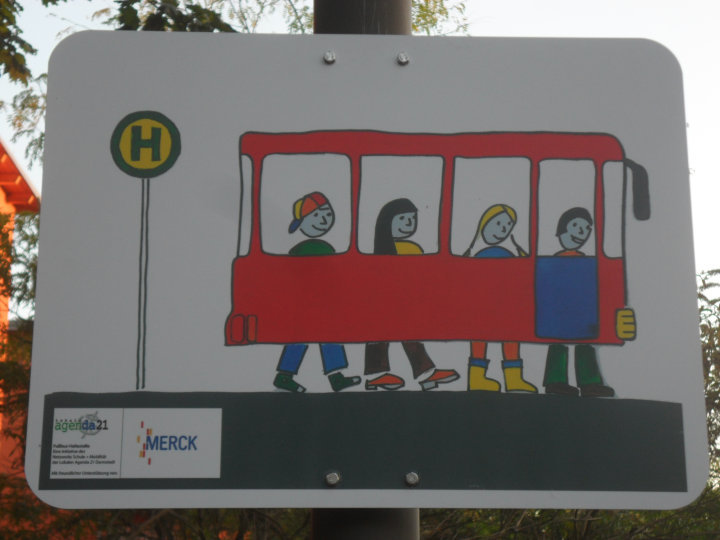
A walking bus stop in Germany

=== Health benefits ===
Children who walk or bicycle to school have higher daily levels of physical activity and better cardiovascular fitness than do children who do not actively commute to school. In a study of adolescents, 100% of the students who walked both to and from school met the recommended levels of 60 or more minutes of moderate to vigorous physical activity on weekdays.

In a pilot, randomized controlled trial (RCT) in Houston, Texas, children who were assigned to a Walking School Bus group increased their weekly rate of active commuting by 38.0% over a five-week period, while children assigned to a no intervention group decreased their active commuting rate by a small margin.

=== Policies and regulations ===
In 2005, the US Federal Transportation Reauthorization Bill—The Safe, Accountable, Flexible, Efficient Transportation Equity Act (SAFETEA-LU 109-59) was passed which provided nearly $1 billion funding to all states for Safe Routes to School (SRTS) programs. The program's purpose is to: “enable and encourage children, including those with disabilities, to walk and bicycle to school; to make walking and bicycling to school safe and more appealing; and to facilitate the planning, development and implementation of projects that will improve safety, and reduce traffic, fuel consumption, and air pollution in the vicinity of schools.” It is a 100% federally funded program which is administered by state departments of transportation. Money goes towards infrastructure-related programs in addition to non-infrastructure activities such as education and enforcement-year time period, restricting data to school-travel hours.

This law is central to the success of programs like the Walking Bus because it identifies the many components involved. Active transport to school and examples such as the walking school bus require collaboration from many different sectors (transportation, law enforcement, school policies, and local government to name a few). In addition, the ability to create an environment conducive to walkability is dependent on the built environment as well as numerous policies from these various sectors.

According to the Institute of Medicine Report, Measuring Progress in Obesity Prevention, the environment people live in can have a profound effect on the amount of physical activity which they engage in. According to James Sallis in his workshop presentation, informal or formal policies issued by the government or private sector, can affect physical activity in four ways. First, zoning, building codes, public transportation and recreational facility policies affect the ability to engage in physical activity. Second, policies affecting physical activity in schools—physical education classes, recess, and walkability to and from school. Policies providing incentives such as parking and commuting in other ways, and insurance subsidies promote walkability and physical activity for adults. Finally, funding policies have a strong influence on physical activity. The 2005 federal law supporting safe Routes to School is meant to facilitate physical activity and increase walkability.

Two national programs that focus on physical activity environment policies are the Health and Human Services Healthy People 2020 and the National Physical Activity Plan, sponsored by numerous organizations including the YMCA, the American Heart Association and the American Cancer Association. The plan is a public-private partnership to create policies that promote physical activity for all individuals. Healthy People 2020 lists objectives to boost physical activity and also supports the recording of national data to track interventions. These are two examples of policies to promote physical activity. The Walking School Bus fits into their programs because it increases activity and translates a sedentary time of the day (transport in car or bus to school) to an active one.

== Risks ==
There are risks associated with travel by any means. International Origins of Walking School Buses and Child Fatalities in Japan and Canada is a study comparing the two countries, with discussion of Western countries in general. Pedestrian injuries have found to be associated with the built environment elements, rather than with increased walking to school. In the US Safe Routes to School (SRTS) provides federal funds for improvements of the built environment near schools with the goal of increasing walking and biking to school.

The effectiveness of SRTS has been demonstrated in multiple studies. One US study analyzed data across 18 states over 16 years. The study compared rates of pedestrian/bicyclist injury in school-aged children to adults, restricting data to school-travel hours. While adult injury rates were largely unchanged over the study period, implementation of SRTS was associated with around a 20% reduction in both pedestrian/bicyclist injury and fatality risk in children. In Texas, traffic crash data over 5 years showed that pedestrian and bicyclist injuries decreased about 40% after the implementation of SRTS. In New York city, SRTS decreased pedestrian injury by one-third in school-age children.

The benefits of SRTS may extend beyond children. While the national study showed adult pedestrian injury risk unchanged, both the Texas and New York studies found reduced pedestrian injury risk in adults with SRTS interventions.

SRTS programs are also effective in increasing walking and bicycling. In California, the effect of SRTS implementation varied widely but rates of observed walking and biking to school increased by 20 to 200%.

== Bike bus ==
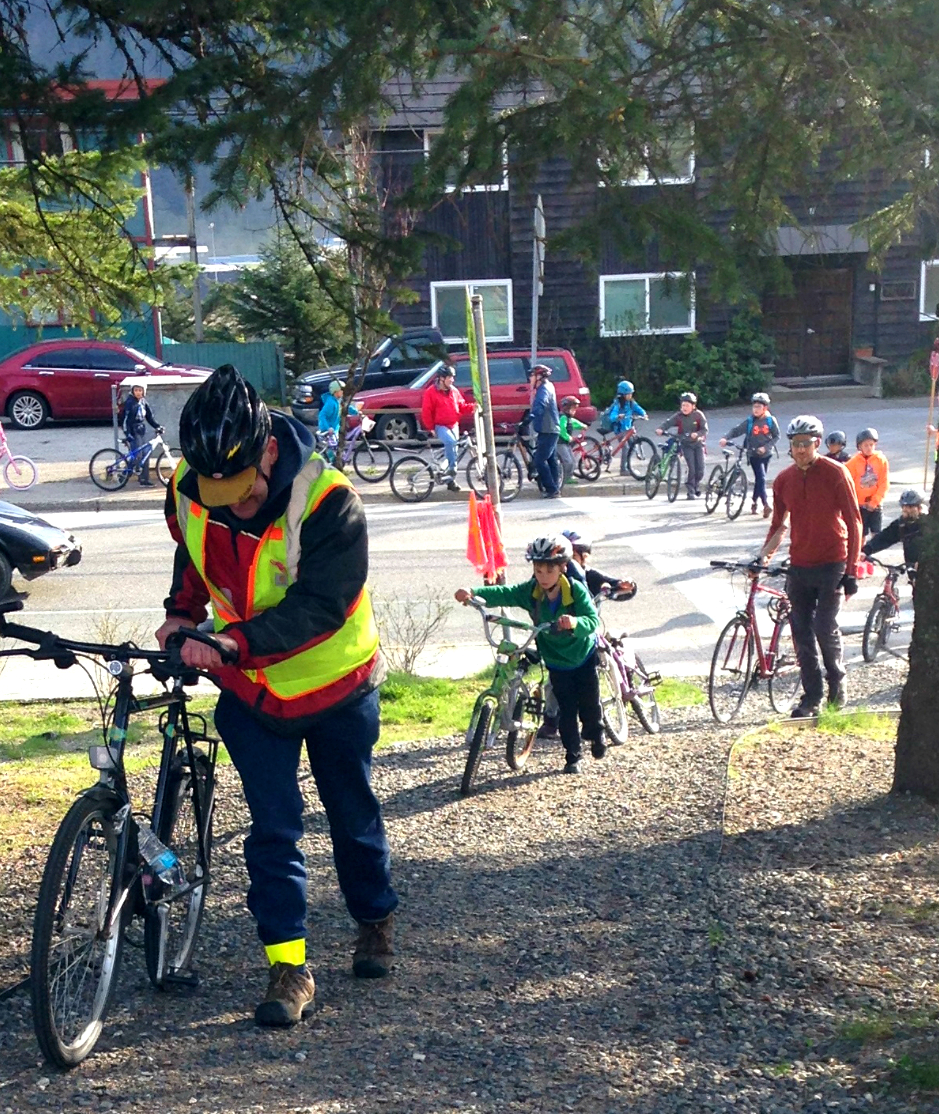
Students in a bike bus

A bike bus (or bicycle train) is the same concept, but with all participants travelling by bicycle instead of on foot.

== Problems ==
In Japan, some traffic accidents have occurred that resulted in the death of multiple schoolchildren who were walking to school in a group. In response to these accidents, schools have chosen to let their students walk to school via different paths, and cities have chosen to reduce speed limits, install road guards, and paint pedestrian zones to reduce the chance of accidents occurring again.

== See also ==
- Autobus (cycling)
- Childhood obesity
- Children's street culture
- Crossing guard
- Junior safety patrol, founded in the 1920s
- Lack of physical education
- Obesity and walking
- School street
- Social influences on fitness behavior
- Walk Safely to School Day
- Walk to school campaign
- Walk to Work Day
- Walkability
- Walking audit
