= Walk Safely to School Day =

Annual national children's event in Australia

Logo for walk safely to school day

Walk Safely to School Day (WSTSD) is an annual, national event in Australia in which primary school children are encouraged to walk or commute safely to school, an initiative of the Pedestrian Council of Australia (which own the trademark). It is held annually in May on a varying date.

Originally only held in New South Wales from 1999 to 2003, the event began nationally on 2 April 2004.

The event is sponsored by the Department of Health and Ageing, and is supported by all state, territory and local governments, the Heart Foundation, the Cancer Council, Planet Ark, Diabetes Australia, Beyond Blue, and the Australian Conservation Foundation. It is promoted by the Pedestrian Council of Australia.

The trademark to "Walk Safely To School Day" is owned by the Pedestrian Council of Australia Limited. Transport for NSW paid an estimated $214,500 as "Sponsorship fees for Walk Safely to School day 2024 program" in 2024. Advertising and promotion for the day cost $138,024.85 in 2025 and $129,598.23 in 2024. A grant of $5,000 grant for the day was made under the "TAC Community Road Safety Grant Program" in 2024.

== Past dates ==
2001: April 6
2002: April 5
2003: April 4
2004: April 2
2005: May 6
2006: April 7
2007: May 4
2008: May 2
2009: May 14
2010: May 7
2011: May 20
2012: May 18
2013: May 24
2014: May 23
2015: May 22
2016: May 20
2017: May 19
2018: May 18
2019: May 17
2020: May 15
2021: May 14
2022: May 20
2023: May 19
2024: May 10
2025: May 16
2026: May 15

== See also ==
- Crossing guard
- Pedestrian crossing
- Walkability
- Walk to School
- Walk to Work Day
- Walking bus
