= ELTIS =

The European Local Transport Information Service (ELTIS) is a non-profit European portal for local transport news and events, transport measures, policies and practices implemented in cities and regions in Europe.

== Overview ==
ELTIS enables information exchange in the field of urban transport and mobility. It is an initiative of the European Commission's Directorate General for Energy and Transport (now split into Energy and Mobility and Transport).

It is designed to improve mobility, transport efficiency and safety and reduce the environmental impacts of transport.

The website contains news on urban transport and mobility; policies and initiatives of the European Commission; open project calls and tenders;tools for practitioners; case studies on urban transport; teaching and educational materials; and a platform for communication.

== News and events ==
The section 'News Around Europe' provides a round-up of local, regional, national and European transport news.

The section 'News of EU Initiatives and Policies' contains urban transport related European policy papers concerning further action at local, regional and national level. It also links to relevant ongoing initiatives supported by the European Commission.

'Events' contains a listing of upcoming conferences, seminars, and workshops on urban transport. Where provided, on-line registration for these events is possible. An archive of past events can be searched and details of events can be submitted with the form provided.

The 'Links' contain web links for selected European institutions, organisations and initiatives in the field of urban transport and mobility.

'Calls and Tender' contains information and links to EU funded calls for proposals and calls for tenders under programmes concerning urban and regional transport.

'Tools for Practitioners' provides training programmes, good practice guides, evaluation tools, practical guidelines and handbooks for local policy makers and officials responsible for implementing policies.

== Case studies ==
The 'Case Studies' offer instructive examples of transport solutions. The database currently contains more than 500 good practice case studies. ELTIS allows its users to submit their own good practice case studies.

The case studies are classified into 13 local transport concepts:

- Clean and energy-efficient vehicles, see also Sustainable transport
- Cycling
- Demand management and pricing
- Flexible mobility services
- Integration, intermodality, organisation of transport
- Mobility management & Travel awareness
- Public passenger transport, see Public Transport
- Safety and security, see Traffic Safety
- Traffic management
- Transport and land use planning
- Transport for people with reduced mobility
- Urban goods traffic / city logistics
- Walking

The search function provides the option to search by keyword.

== See also ==
- CIVITAS (European Union)
- Green transport
- Green travel
- Road safety
- Sustainability
- Traffic congestion
- Transportation planning
