= Walk to Work Day =

Annual event in Australia

- Observed by: Australia
- Frequency: annual

Walk to Work Day is an annual, national event in Australia encouraging people to walk to work. The event is an initiative of the Pedestrian Council of Australia, and supported by the Australian Government. In 2015, it was held on Friday 13 November.

== Event details and history ==
Through Walk to Work Day, the Pedestrian Council of Australia draw attention to the health and wellbeing benefits of walking. Since 2000 Walk to Work Day has been a national event supported by the Australian Government. 2003 was the first time the event was held on the same date across all Australian states and territories. Several non-government organisations also promote the day, including the Australian Medical Association and the Health Services Union.

Herb Elliott led a celebrity walk across Sydney Harbour Bridgt for the event in 1999. In 2001, distance swimmer Grant Hackett backed the event in national media, including in The Sunday Telegraph. In 2003, Prime Minister John Howard featured in national Walk to Work Day television and radio commercials.

== See also ==
- Crossing guard
- Walk Safely to School Day
- Walk to school campaign
- Walking bus
- National Pedestrian Day
