= Student transport =

Transport for children to and from schools and events

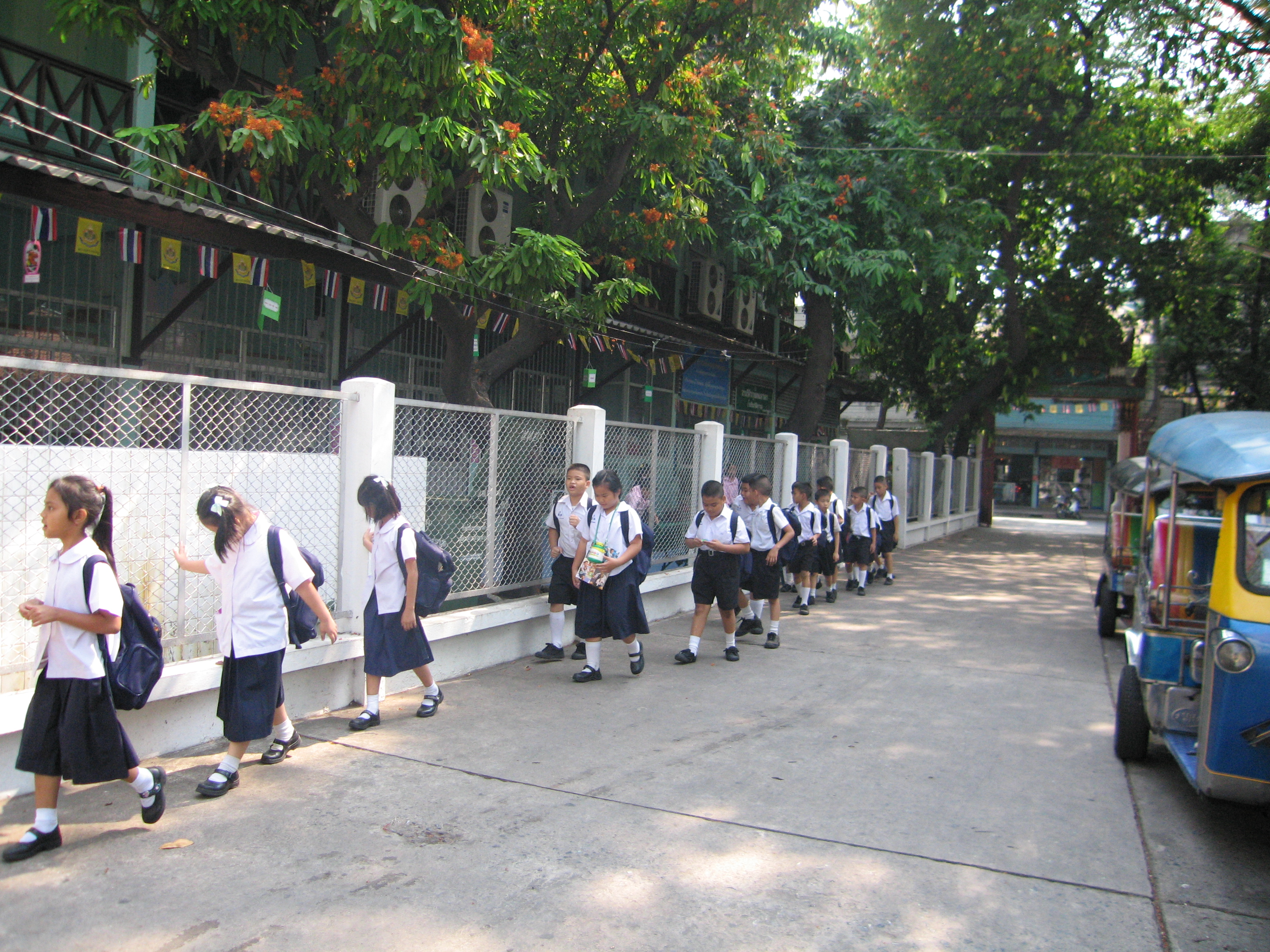
Thai students walking

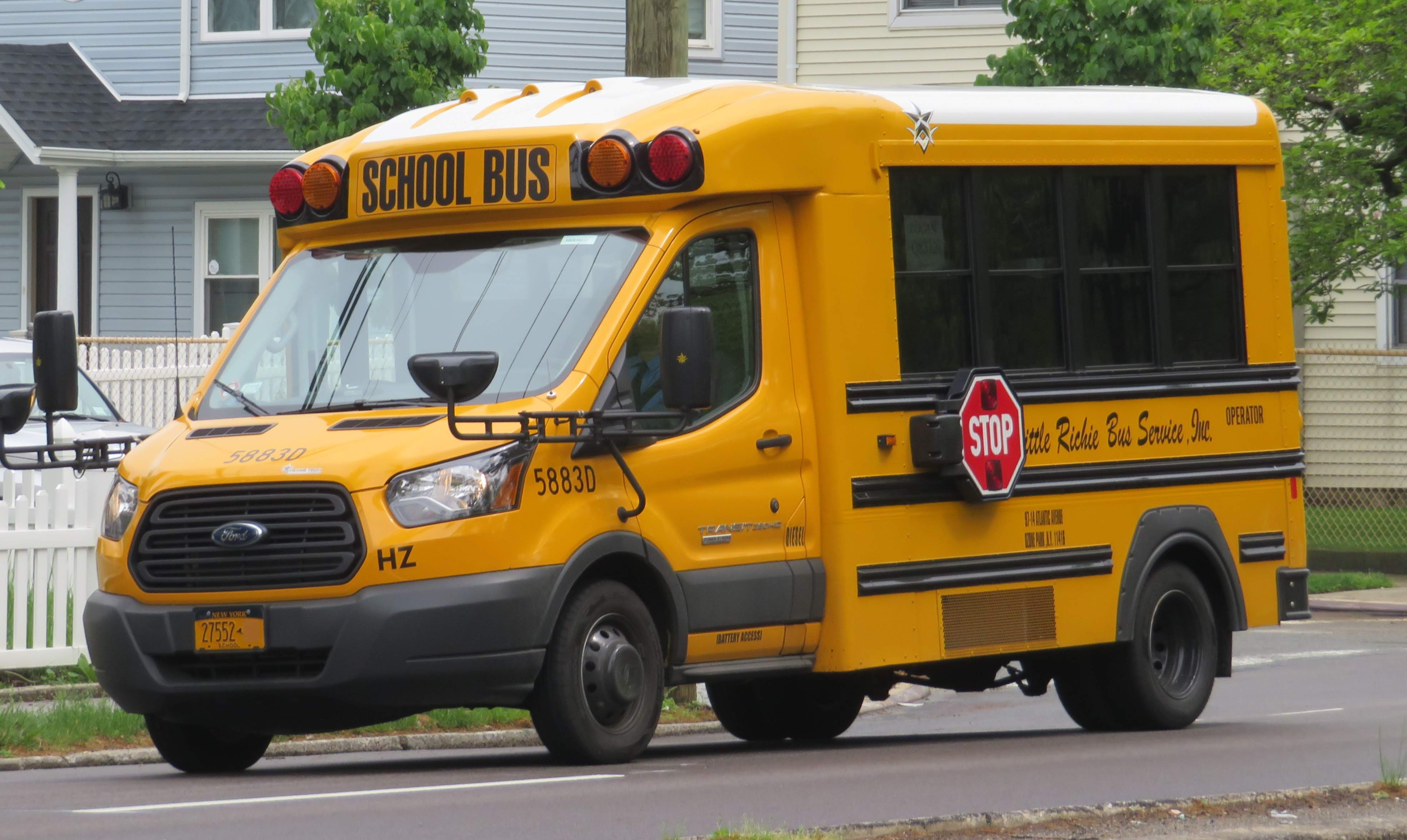
A school bus in New York, US

Student transport is the transporting of children and teenagers to and from schools and school events. School transport can be undertaken by school students themselves (on foot, bicycle or perhaps horseback; or for older students, by car), they may be accompanied by family members or caregivers, or the transport may be organised collectively, using school buses or taxis.

== Transport modes ==
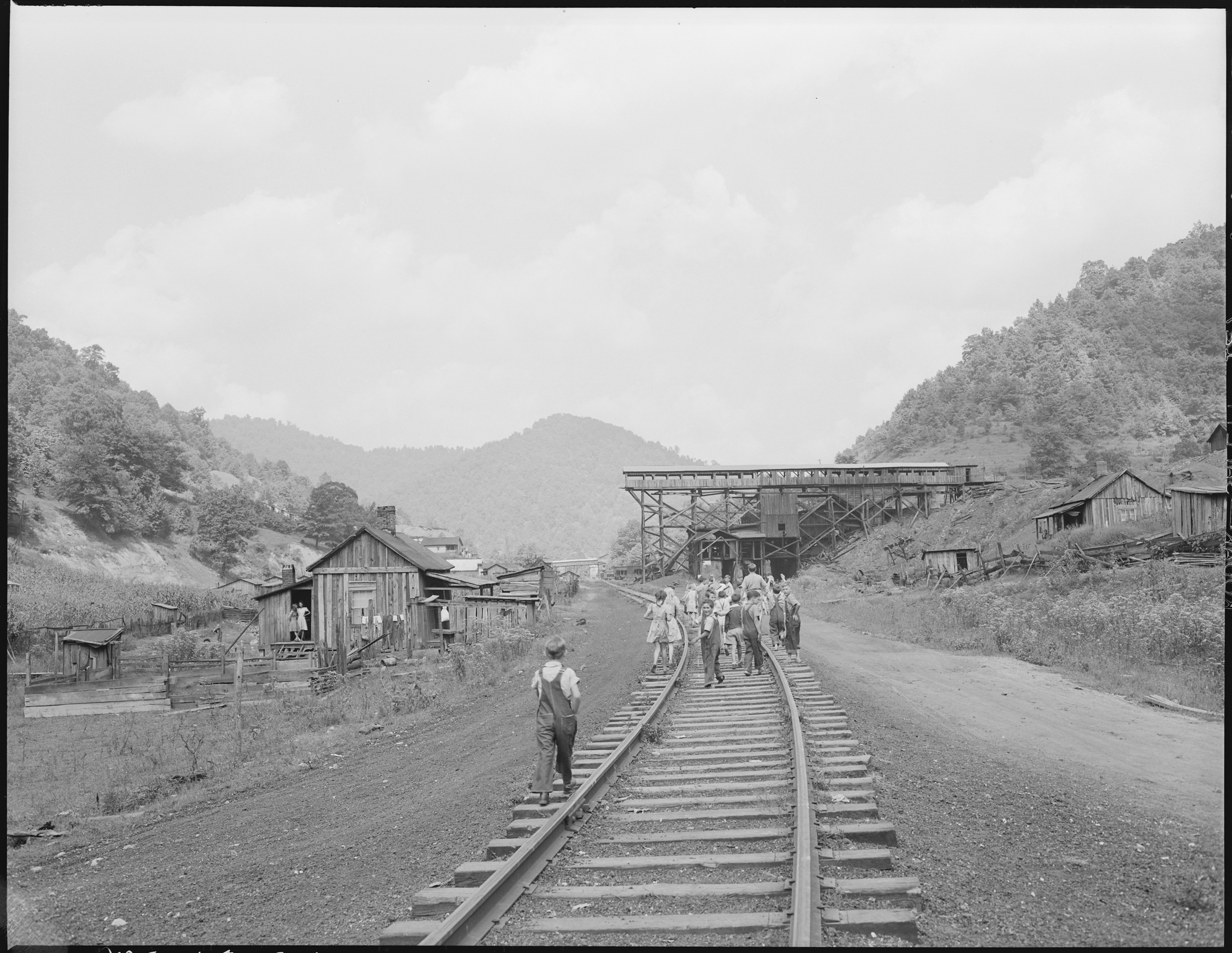
Kentucky students walking along the railroad, 4 September 1946

=== General public transport ===
Using the general-purpose public transport is the most common means of student transport, in some countries. Some countries such as Australia have special routes and timetables exclusively used by students, but still run by public transportation services. Sometimes the parents or the students get reimbursed when they buy public transport tickets.

=== School bus ===
Student transport can use specially designed school buses. Many districts in Canada and the United States use specially built and equipped school buses, painted school bus yellow and equipped with various forms of warning and safety devices specific to them. In other parts of the world, buses used for transporting students tend to be more general-purpose type buses than their North American counterparts.

=== Car ===
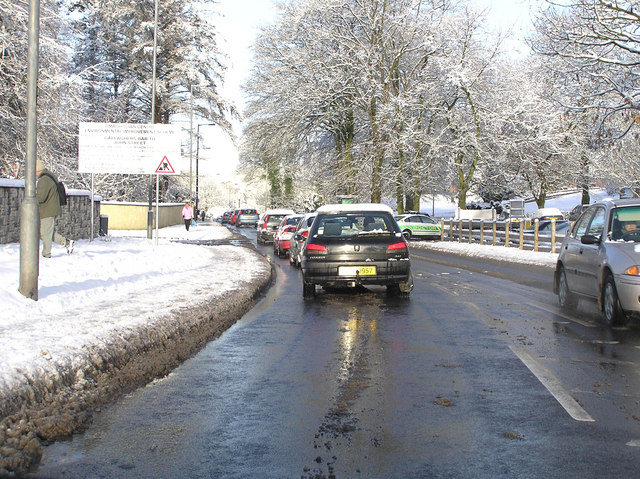
School run, Omagh

Parental transport of students in the family automobile, sometimes termed the "school run", is increasing due to perceived hazards to unaccompanied children. Older students in some countries are able to drive themselves to school. However, most countries minimum age for driving is 17 or 18, only Kosovo has a minimum driving age below 14.

=== Walking ===
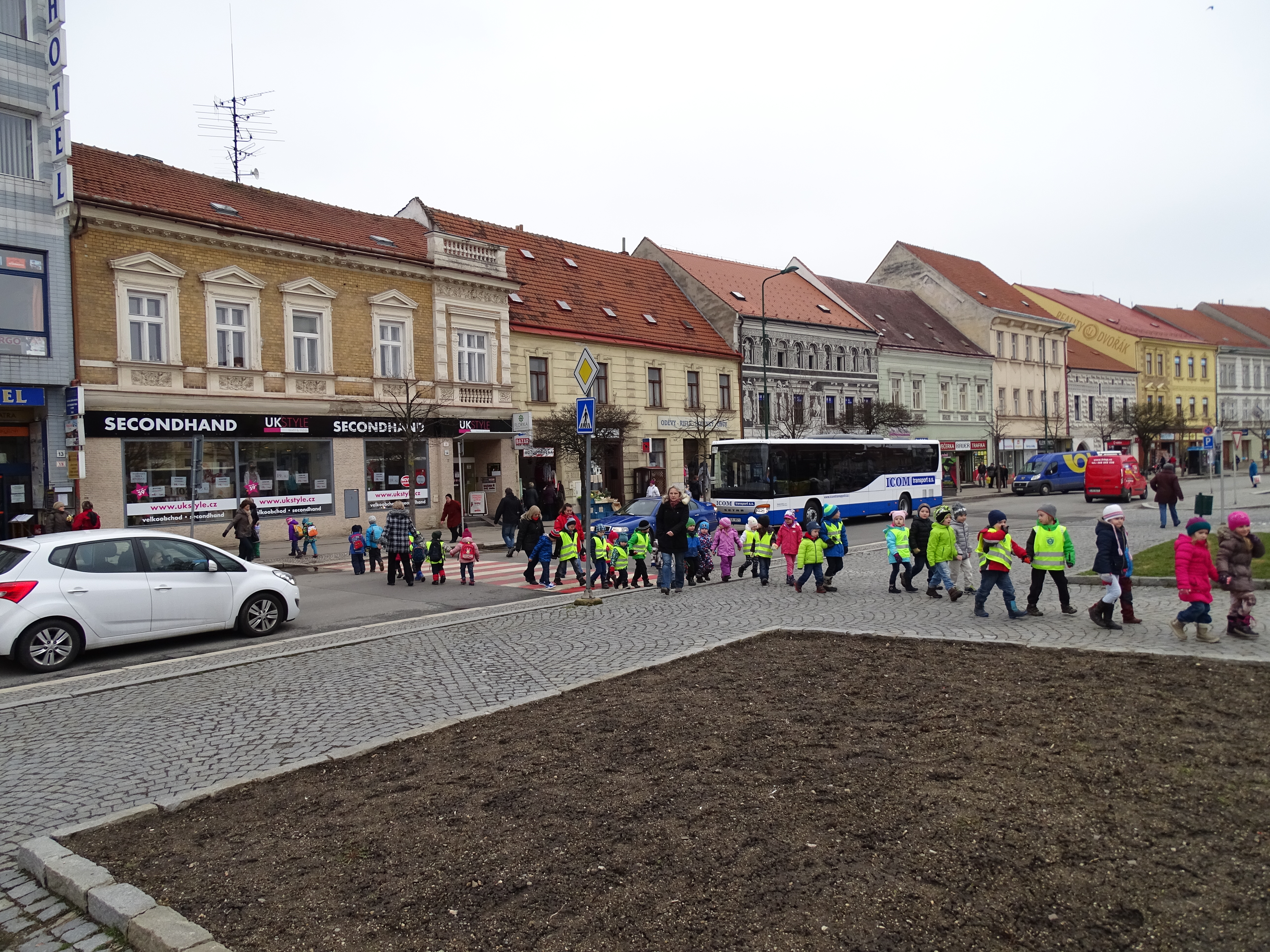
Walking bus, Třebíč-Vnitřní Město, Třebíč District, Vysočina Region, Czechia, Karlovo náměstí

The Walk to School campaign and 'walking buses' promote the benefits of walking to school. In the latter, student groups are escorted supervised by adults to travel to or from school on foot.

=== Cycling ===
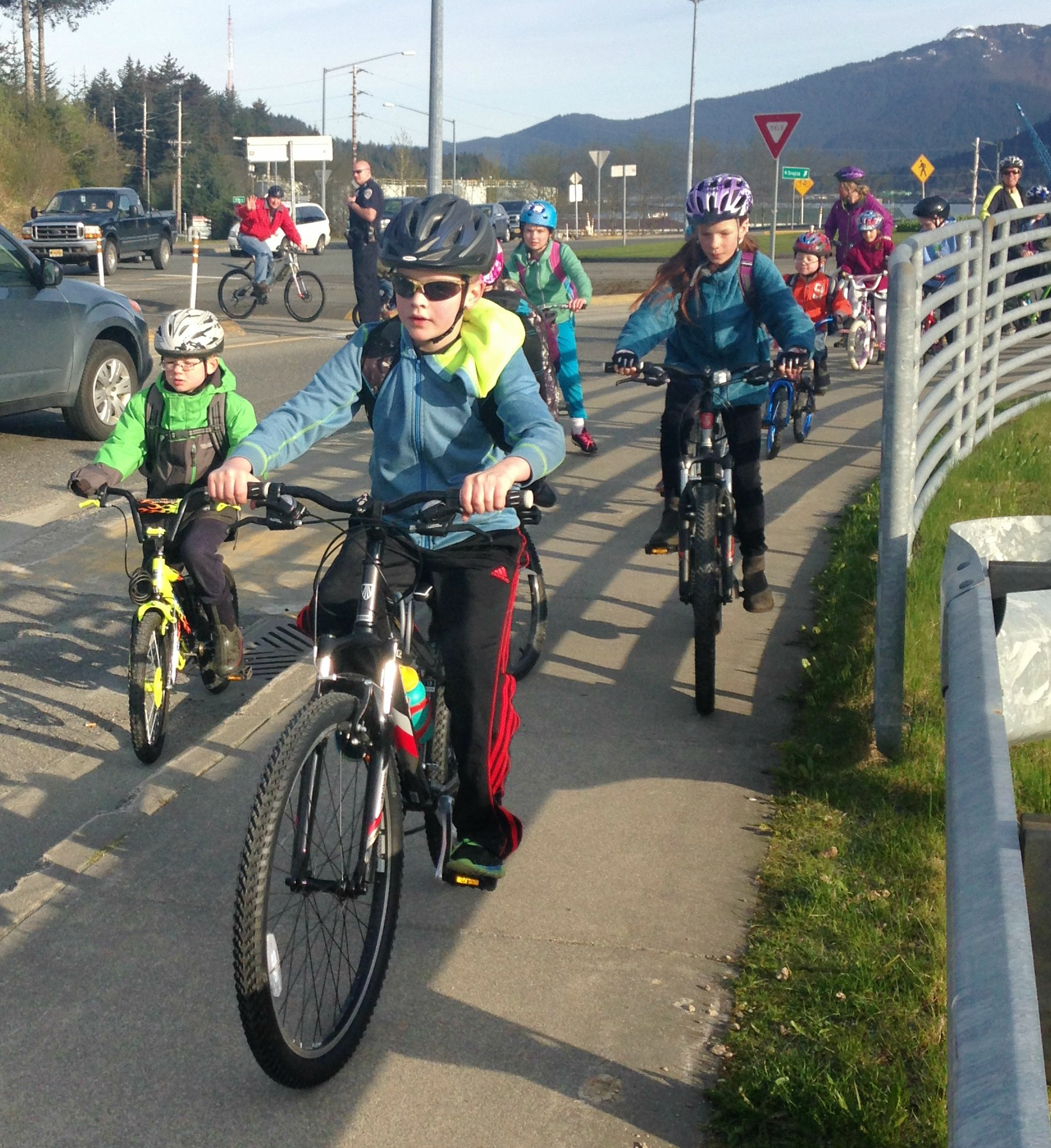
Gastineau Elementary Bike to School Day

Cycling to school is popular among students and bike sheds a common feature of schools. Bike buses are supervised bicycle rides for students to travel to or from school in large groups by bicycle or other pedal or human powered vehicles such as scooters.

== Safety and student transport modes ==
A 1994 report based on Australian road safety statistics found that traveling to school by bus is:

- 7 times less likely to cause serious injury or death than being driven in a family car,
- 31 times less likely to cause the same than walking
- 228 times less likely to cause the same than cycling.

Officials of the National Transportation Safety Board (in the U.S.) say school buses are safer than cars, even if they are not fitted with seat belts.

== Student transport by country ==
=== Argentina ===
In Argentina, although most students either walk, are driven by parents, or take regular public transit to school, many of them use private buses carrying an identification and authorization of government in each city. They are usually white and orange and are mostly vans, a change from the times when bigger transit-style buses were used. Parents pay the van owner a monthly fee to carry their children back and forth from school. These vans are not affiliated to the school and usually transport children from different schools in the same route.

=== Australia ===
In Australia, students who live in outer suburban or rural areas often travel on public buses and trains or on special routes provided by private bus companies. The school services cross-subsidise the regular bus routes. In inner city areas, school students travel on government-owned route service buses. Students travel on either a public route bus, or a "school special" service. Some private schools have their own buses which are often provided by a school where a private company is unwilling or unable to provide the service.

Student transport in Australia

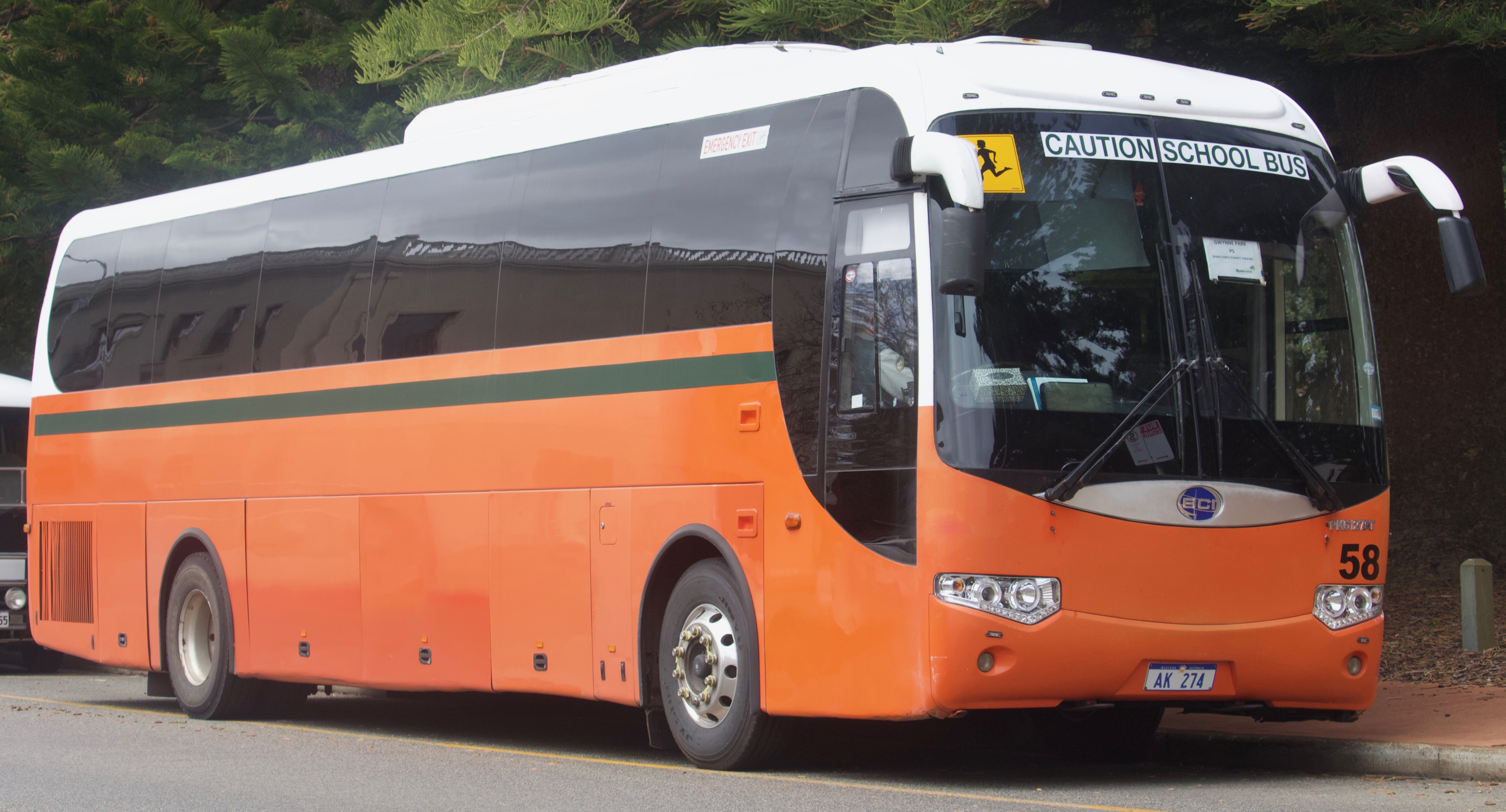
Bus operated by a private contractor in Perth, Western Australia

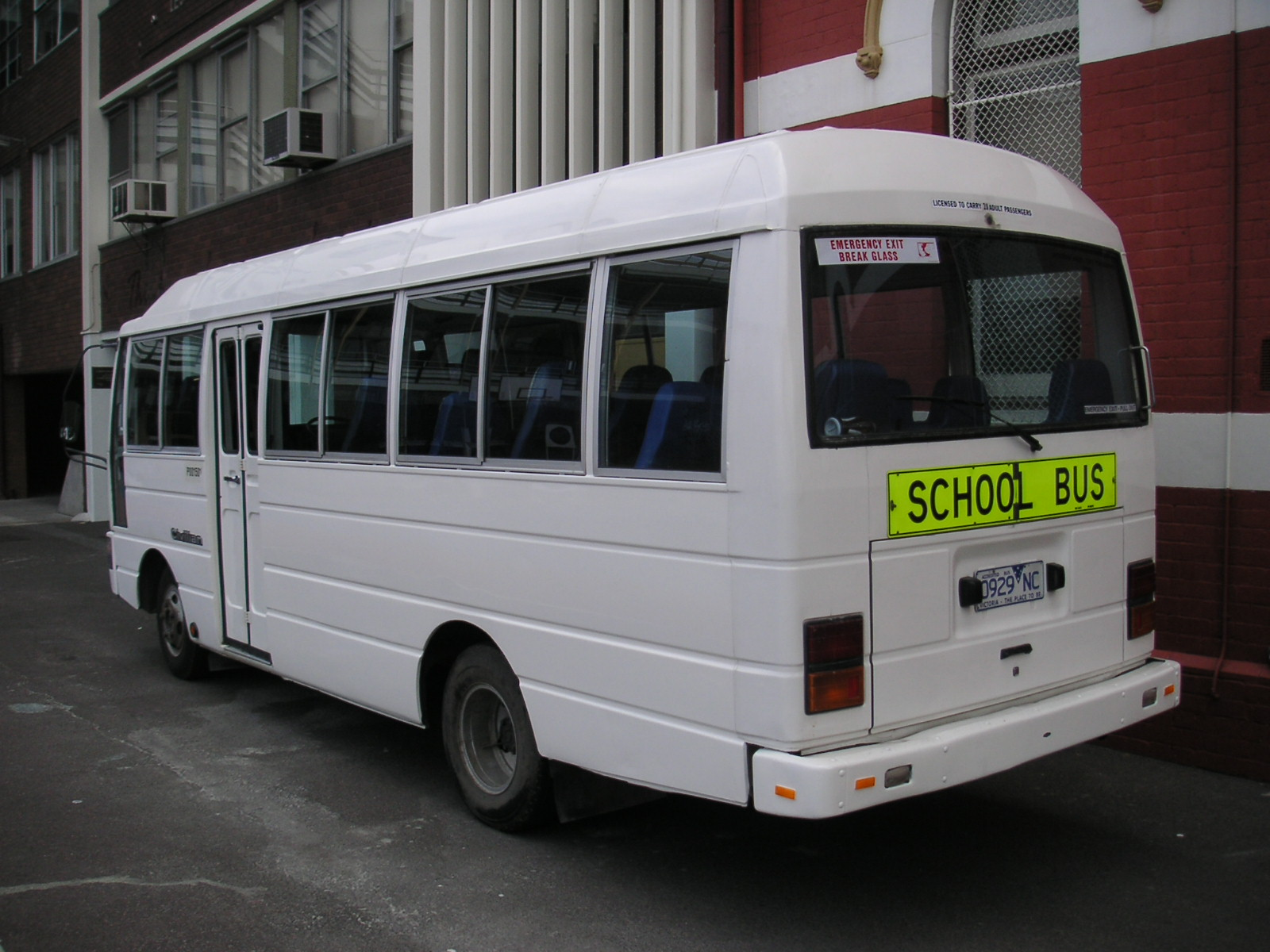
A bus from a high school in Melbourne, Australia

New South Wales

In New South Wales, school bus transport is listed as one of the safest forms of land transport, other than train (current figures are represented without seatbelts installed). Students in years K-2 get free travel regardless of where they live, students in years 3-6 get free travel if they live further than 1.6 kilometres (0.99 mi) radial distance or 2.3 kilometres (1.4 mi) by the most direct practical walking distance from the school, and high school students get free travel only if they live more than 2 kilometres (1.2 mi) radial distance or 2.9 kilometres (1.8 mi) by the most direct practical walking distance from school.

The concept of the walking bus was first invented in Australia 1992 by David Engwicht.

=== Canada ===
In Canada, student transport is generally handled in much the same way as it is in the United States: the yellow school bus. Canadian school districts usually engage school bus contractors for student transport services, almost always provided without charge to families. Outside of the metrification of the dashboard instruments and the French-language signage on school buses in the province of Quebec, Canadian and U.S. school buses are largely identical (and are produced by the same manufacturers).

Due to its many remote and historically isolated communities, Canada had some of the only examples of a railway school car, which brought travelling teachers to these communities on a temporary basis, as it was often easier than transporting students to schools or building local schools in these areas. This system, which was operated by both the Canadian National Railway and the Canadian Pacific Railway, ran for decades until it ended in the 1960s. This system is commemorated at the School on Wheels Museum in Clinton, Ontario.

In Southern Ontario, some students in the early 20th century commuted to and from school using the interurban electric railways and street railway systems that existed at the time, which were largely shut down around the time of the Great Depression and Second World War. During the 1950s, some high school students in rural Northern Ontario commuted to school on Greyhound motor coaches.

=== Colombia ===
In 2007, it was reported students at a school in Los Pinos, a town near Bogotá, travel to school by zip line across the Rio Negro.

=== Finland ===
In Finland, students who live more than 5 kilometers away from the nearest school, or have other significant impediments to going to the school, are eligible to either bus or taxi rides. The buses and taxis that are used are normal vehicles, typically operated by local companies. Buses that are reserved solely for school busing have "Koulukyyti/Skolskjuts" markings on front and back. Taxis engaged in student transport have a triangular sign on the roof. Buses engaged in student transport are limited to driving at 80 km/h maximum speed.

=== Germany ===
There are no special school buses in Germany with a few exceptions. Public transport timetables are often adapted to the needs of secondary schools. Some German states offer a reimbursement for public transport tickets.

=== Hong Kong ===
Student transport in Hong Kong
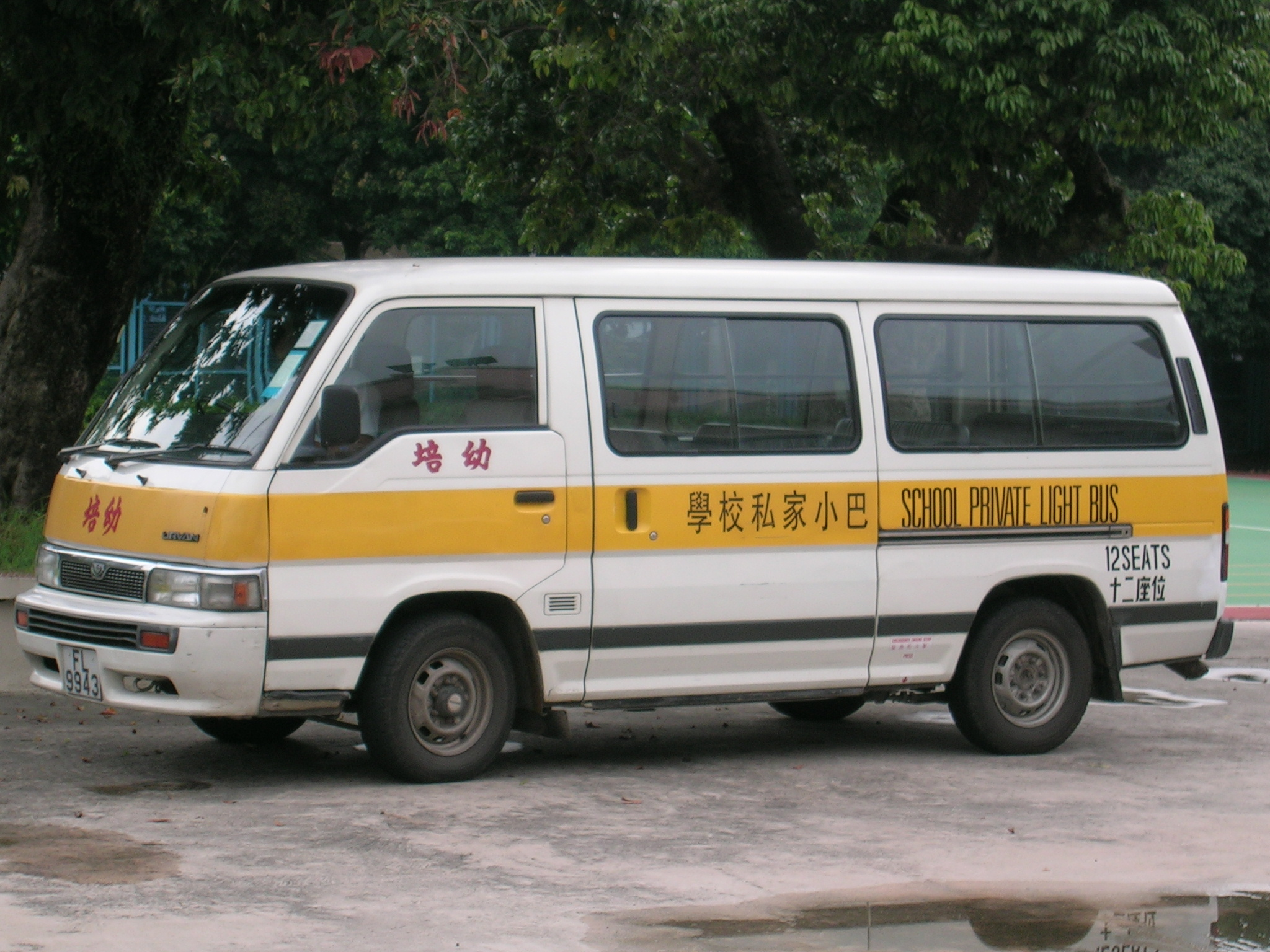
Vehicles used for student transport in Hong Kong are commonly known as "nanny vans".

In Hong Kong, younger students are transported between their homes and schools by "nanny vans". These vehicles are typically van-based and are smaller than a typical Hong Kong public light bus. When nanny vans originated, they were regulated primarily by the schools and the van drivers. Today, in the interest of safety, nanny vans are government-regulated vehicles that run on fixed routes. Another Way Students Are transported are by School Buses which can fit 15 students a bus mother and a driver. The Bus Mother takes care of the children while they are on the bus and help the bus driver while he is driving. Some school buses fit up to 27 Students but are mostly 16 students per bus.

=== The Netherlands ===
In the Netherlands, there is not an organized form of student transport on a large scale.

Children who attend kindergarten are usually brought by their parents.

Almost all students at elementary school go to school by foot, as they live close by the school. Students who live further away, go by bike.

When the students go to high school, they usually go by bike. When the student has a handicap (or goes to a special education school) and is therefore not able to go to school by a regular bike, they get a budget from the municipality to pay for a taxi to go to school with (with a normal taxi, there are not different taxis for student who go to school) or for an annual season ticket so the students can use public transport.

When the students go to college, they get an annual season ticket from the government, so they can use the public transport 'for free' ('For free', because when the government introduced this scheme in the 1990s, students yearly budgets were cut as a result, without a choice for students to opt in or out).

=== New Zealand ===
In New Zealand, student transport is sometimes provided by the New Zealand Ministry of Education through school bus contractors or general bus companies. Bus companies generally have a fleet of older transit buses or coaches, different from the newer public service fleet vehicles, to cater for school services. While carrying students, buses are marked by either "SCHOOL", "SCHOOL BUS", "KURA" (Maori for "school"), or pictograms of children in black on a fluorescent chartreuse background, and are limited on the open road to 80 km/h (50 mph). These signs all indicate that a motorist must slow to 20 km/h (12 mph) when passing a stationary bus in either direction.

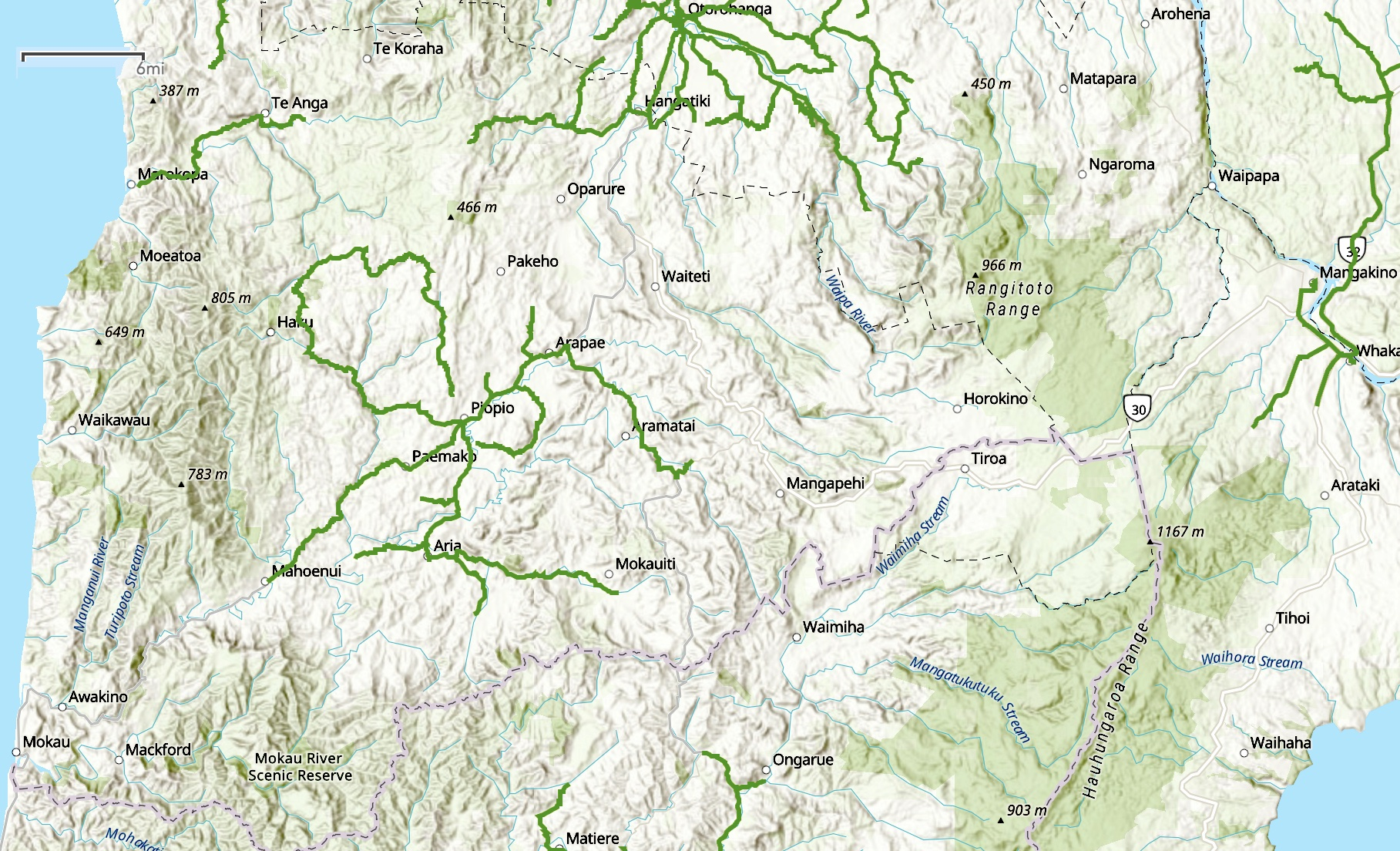
The school bus network has many gaps in rural areas. For example, the original Piopio routes are well isolated from neighbouring services

A student is entitled to free school bus transport if they attend the closest state or state integrated school appropriate for the student's year level and gender, and in the case of a state integrated school, the special character the student or parents identifies with. However, students are not entitled to transport if they live within 3.2 km (2.0 mi) of the school for primary school students (ages 5–12) or within 4.8 km (3.0 mi) of the school for secondary school students (ages 13–18). Students are also not eligible if there are suitable public transport services between the school and the student's residence, ruling out free transport in most cities. School buses generally operate where there are 4 or more pupils entitled to transport support.

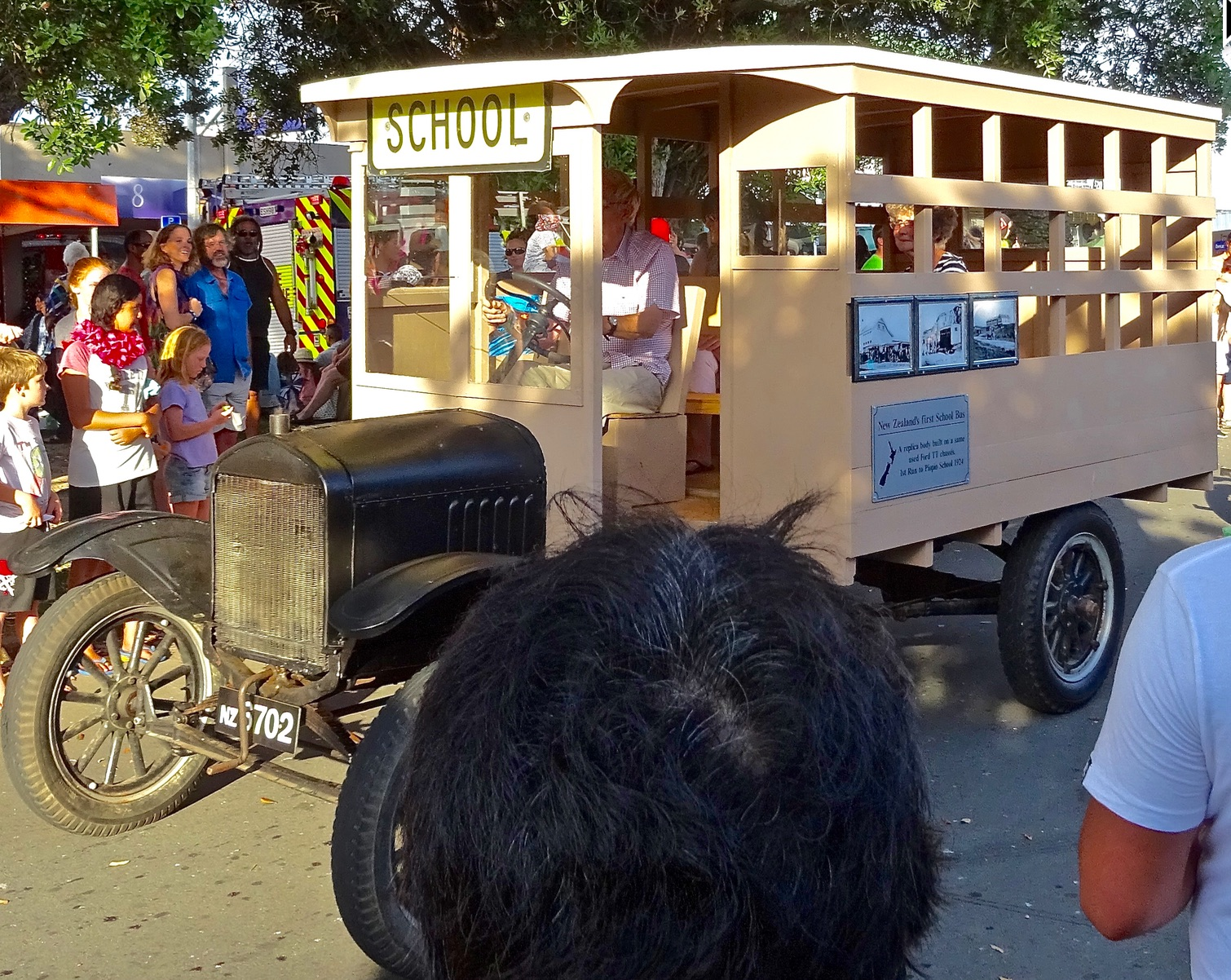
Ford Model T similar to the first three Piopio buses in 1924

Free school busing is a fast-diminishing phenomenon in New Zealand. It has historically favored rural students. As population migration trends internal to New Zealand have favored the growth of cities, it is an increasingly smaller minority of students who are served by school buses. Parents, acting as chauffeurs, are filling this gap, with multiple negative consequences (e.g. productivity losses for the New Zealand workforce, increased vehicular traffic interfering with commercial or industrial traffic well into the work-day, increased carbon footprint, diminished development of transport self-management skills in early teenagers, dangerous concentrations of hectic motoring near congested school entrances at school start-times, etc). The matter occasionally surfaces in the New Zealand media, but making free school busing the norm is usually dismissed as another example of American-style thinking.

In Auckland, New Zealand, as at November 2007, one hundred schools were running 230 walking buses with over 4,000 children and 1,500 adults participating.

Before school buses were introduced, from 1924 onwards, rural children rode to school and left their horses in the school paddock, known as a glebe in some areas. The Education Department paid about 4d a day towards the upkeep of each horse. The first buses allowed five rural schools to be merged into one, a pattern which continued as school buses spread (e.g. Raupo Consolidated High School in 1929), so that, by 1940, the five had increased to 650, but wartime rationing slowed the pace of consolidation. Tendering for services began in 1987. Prior to that loans were available to buy buses. As of 2022, Go Bus has 679 of about 2,150 routes.

=== United Kingdom ===
In the United Kingdom, most student transport is performed by ordinary transit buses. These buses can be used for other purposes when not in use for school journeys. Most children use local scheduled public transport bus services. In almost all cases, dedicated school transport bus services in the UK are contracted out to local bus companies.

London

In Greater London, many school children travel to school using the ordinary bus service, with travel being free using the Oyster card system.

==== Switch to dedicated school buses ====
Student transport in the UK

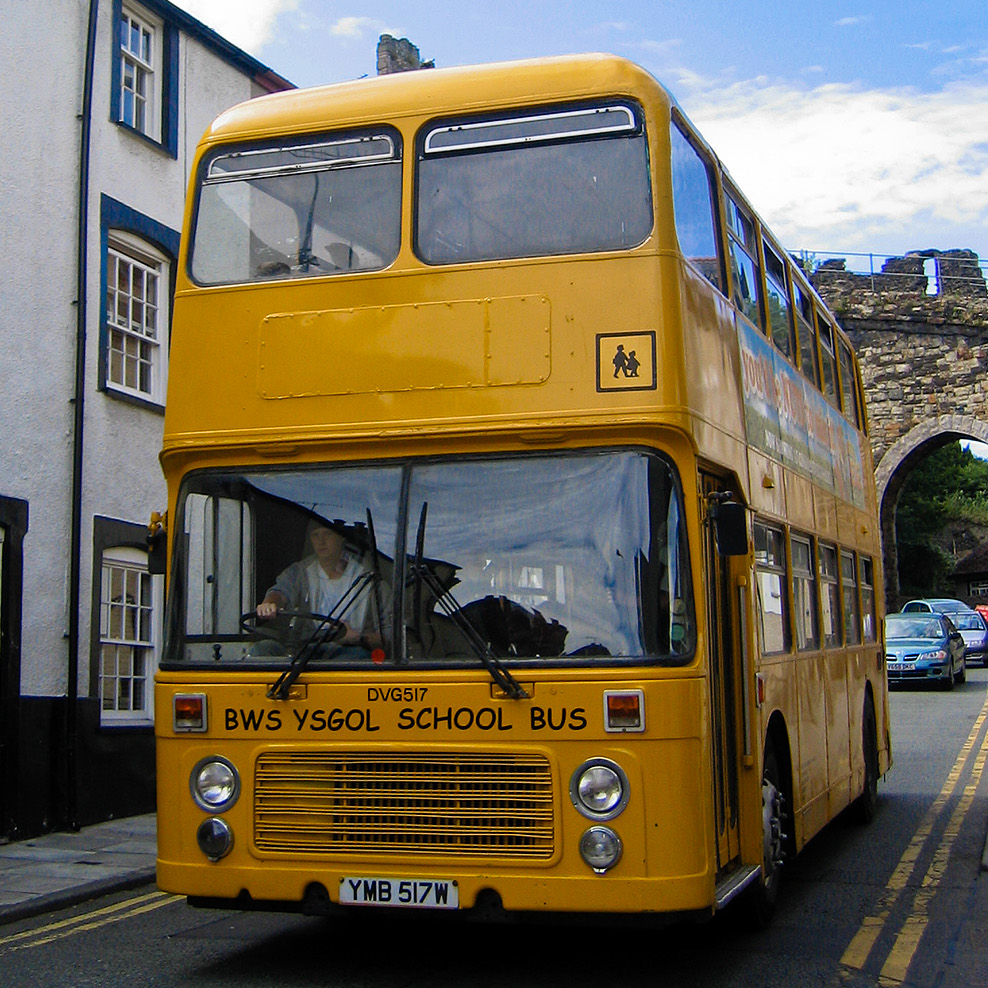
A yellow painted UK Double Decker School Bus, usually these are operated for school routes only.

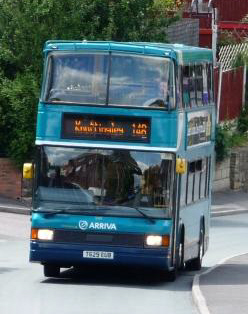
A normal UK Double Decker Bus, These are operated for everyday use as well as school routes.

In the United Kingdom, there are concerns about children's safety after they have alighted from conventional buses used for student transport. There are also more general worries about safety, such as lack of seatbelts, crowded buses, and in Northern Ireland especially, the use of "three for two" seating, where three children are expected to sit on a bench seat intended for two passengers.

Other concerns include poorly maintained buses, drivers' backgrounds, children travelling on public buses and school children's behaviour. In one case in 2009, two boys aged 14 and 15 fell out of a bus window, after they leaned on the side of the Premiere Travel bus they were travelling on.

As a result of this, over the past decade, starting in around 2000, the talk of and introduction of dedicated, yellow student-specific school buses has been widespread. In 2005, it was reported that the introduction of such buses would "save pupils". As well as safety benefits, it would also be better to the environment, though this is partly due to a resulting decrease in driving.

North American-style 'yellow' school buses (built by European manufacturers) are being introduced by First Student UK and My bus.

==== Walking ====
The Walk to school campaign is a British campaign promoting the benefits of walking to school. It is run by the charities Living Streets and Travelwise. It receives funding from the Department for Transport and Transport for London.

Walking buses have remained popular. The first walking bus in the United Kingdom was introduced in 1998 by Hertfordshire County Council and used by students of Wheatfields Junior School in St Albans in 1998

=== United States ===
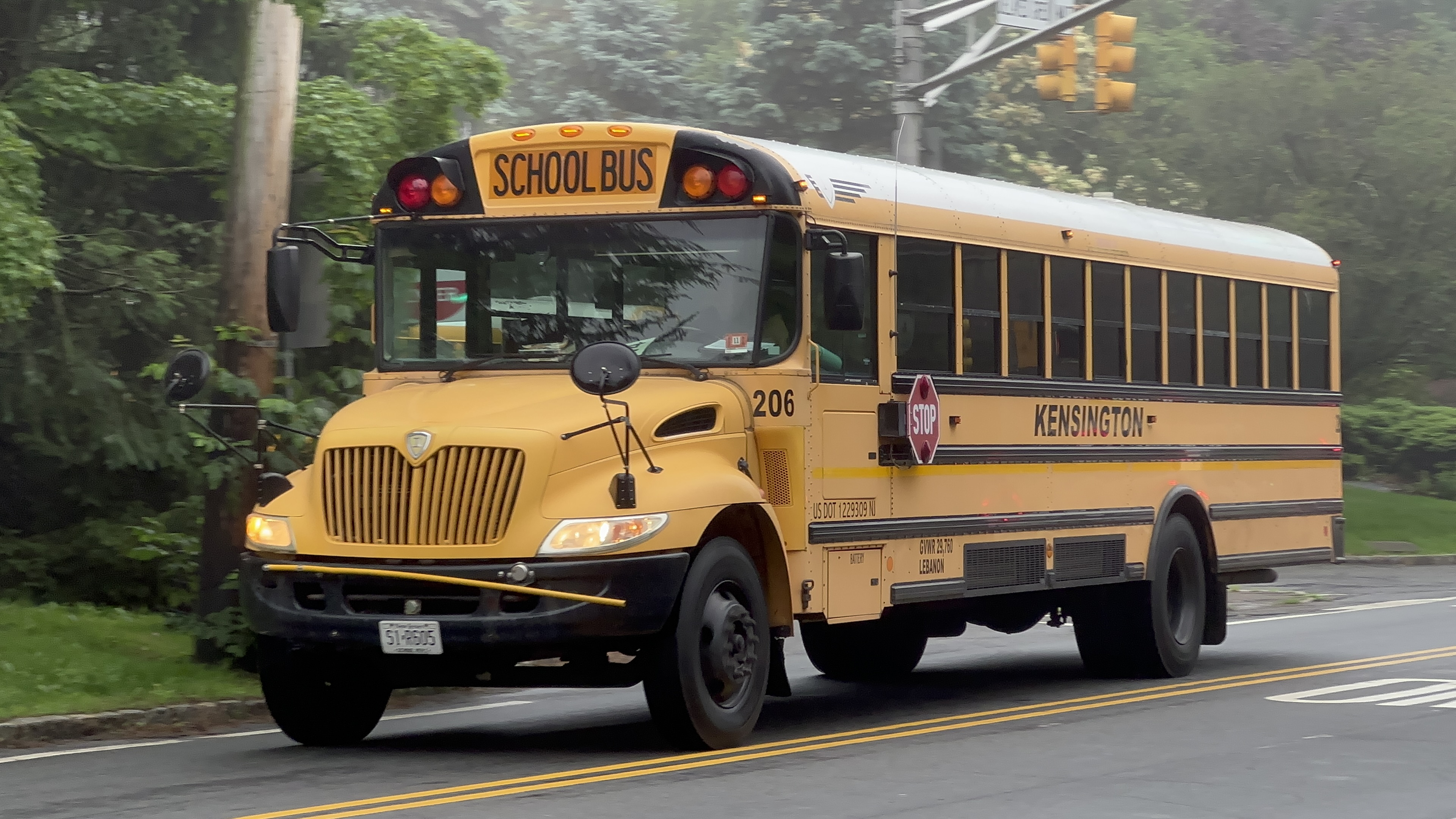
US school bus (NJ spec IC CE shown)

In the United States, purpose-built school buses are the primary means of student transport, almost always provided without charge to families. In the US, the term, "busing" is also used to refer to desegregation busing, the transport of students to schools other than the closest local school for increased racial integration.

Each year, school buses provide an estimated 10 billion student trips in the United States. Every school day, 475,000 school buses transport 25 million children to and from schools and school-related activities. School buses are purchased or leased by some school districts, while other school districts engage the service of school bus contractors to perform this function. Approximately 40% of school districts in the United States use contractors to handle the function of student transport.

However, the use of standard public transit buses is increasingly common in urban areas. For example, New York City provides yellow school bus service to select students based on grade level and their distance from the school, but relies on the public New York City Transit bus system to transport students in grades 7-12 and younger students where dedicated school bus service is unavailable. Free or half-price transit passes are provided by the school system for this purpose. Some public transit services may provide "tripper service" with routes designed to serve local schools. Such routes are regularly scheduled transit routes that are open to the public and, by law, cannot be used exclusively for school transportation, but are drawn to connect local schools to nearby communities and transit centers. Most kids over the age of 16 drive to school.

== See also ==
- Bus driver
- Childhood obesity
- Commuting
- Desegregation busing in the United States
- Driver visibility
- Home zone/ Play street
- List of school bus manufacturers
- School street
- Turning Point (2009 American film)
- Walking bus
