= Climate Alliance =

- Founded: 1990, Frankfurt am Main, Germany
- Type: Association
- Purpose: Municipal climate protection, municipal climate adaptation, climate justic, indigenous peoples of Amazonia
- Location: Frankfurt am Main, Brussels, Berlin
- Region served: Europe
- Members: 2,009 (December 2025)
- Website: https://www.climatealliance.org/

Climate Alliance was founded in 1990 as a network of cities, towns, municipalities and counties located either in Europe or the Amazon Basin, committed to the protection of the world's climate. The current 2,009 members form Europe's largest city network taking local action on the global climate crisis.

The European Secretariat of Climate Alliance is based in Frankfurt am Main, Germany, Berlin, Germany and in Brussels, Belgium. The members of Climate Alliance are located in Austria, Belarus, Belgium, Bulgaria, Croatia, Czech Republic, Denmark, Finland, France, Georgia, Germany, Hungary, Ireland, Italy, Luxembourg, North Macedonia, Netherlands, Peru, Poland, Portugal, Romania, Slovakia, Slovenia, Spain, Sweden, Switzerland and Ukraine.

== Purpose and aims ==
Climate Alliance comprise some 2,000 members from more than 25 countries, as of December 2025. Each member aims to reduce greenhouse gas emissions at their source. Their allies are the indigenous peoples of the rainforests. The indigenous partners are represented by COICA, the Coordination of Indigenous Organisations of the nine neighbouring countries of the Amazon Basin.

By joining Climate Alliance, cities and municipalities embrace the association's goals:

- To reduce greenhouse gas emissions (by 10% every five years) while striving for a 95 percent reduction in greenhouse gas emissions by 2050 compared to 1990 levels, in line with IPCC recommendations.
- To implement effective and comprehensive climate action in accordance with Climate Alliance principles.
- To promote climate justice together with indigenous peoples by supporting their rights, protecting biodiversity and abstaining from the use of unsustainably managed timber.

Foundation pillars of local climate protection are energy savings and efficient energy use as well as Renewable energy sources and environment-friendly mobility. Climate Alliance advises cities and municipalities on the implementation of climate protection strategies and develops recognised tools for standardised recording of energy consumption and CO_{2} emissions. Furthermore, Climate Alliance develops and coordinates projects and campaigns, which address different target groups. Besides of its own activities Climate Alliance is partner of further campaigns and steps also into political actions. On national and international level it stands up for European local authorities engaged in climate protection and supports organisations of Indigenous peoples.
