= David Engwicht =

Australian urban planner

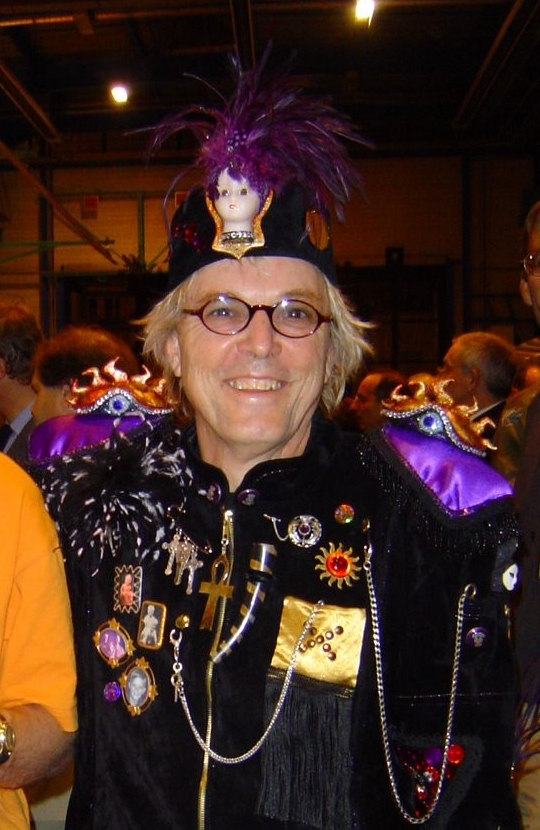
- David Engwicht at the 2003 Velo-city conference in Paris
- Born: 1950 (age 75–76)
- Occupation: Urban planner

David Engwicht (born 1950) is an urban planner who resides in Brisbane, Australia. He is a speaker on the topics of transportation, community, and creativity and has given lectures around the world.

Engwicht attended Kingaroy State High School in Queensland, Australia. He played a role in creating the first neighbourhood Pace Car Program in Boise, Idaho and is an advocate of shared space schemes. Engwicht is known for his contributions to traffic calming and is credited with inventing the walking bus, street reclamation, and the Universal Anchoring Device. In 2015, Engwicht gave a presentation titled "Add some magic to a public space near you" at TEDx Indianapolis.

== Books ==
David Engwicht is the author of several books, including:

- Towards an eco-city: calming the traffic (1992)
- Reclaiming our Cities and Towns: Better Living through Less Traffic (1993)
- The cultural planning handbook: an essential Australian guide (1995)
- Street Reclaiming: Creating Livable Streets and Vibrant Communities (1999)
- Mental Speed Bumps: The smarter way to tame traffic (2005)

== See also ==
- Shared space
