= Bicycle user group =

A bicycle user group (BUG) or cycle user group (CUG), bicycle association or cycling organization is a group set up to promote cycling issues in, for example, a place of employment or a local government area. The user group might be a part of or affiliated with a bigger cycling organization representing cyclists' interests at the city or state level.

== Activities ==
For example, the group may lobby employers or local authorities to:

- Install bicycle parking facilities
- Encourage motorists to respect cyclists and promote cycling culture
- Install shower facilities in places of work
- Construct bicycle paths and on-road bike lanes
- Reduce speed limits on local roads or otherwise improve local roads for cyclists

The group may encourage other members of the organization or area to take up cycling. They may make special arrangements to assist new cyclists, such as:

- A program of rides
- Community bike days
- Preparing maps of good routes
- Offering education and advice
- Organizing group commuting by bicycle buses
- Assistance in obtaining cycling grants
- Performing cycling audits or maintaining wayfinding systems such as numbered-node cycle networks to aid cyclability

== See also ==
- Bicycle Network, an Australian charity
- Walking audit, an assessment of the walkability or pedestrian access of an external environment
