= Walk to School =

British pedestrian safety campaign

Walk to School is a British campaign promoting the benefits of walking to school as student transport. It is a founder member of the IWALK (International Walk to School) organisation.

The campaign is run by the charity Living Streets and has received funding from the Department for Transport and Department for Health.

== Activities ==
The Walk to School campaign coordinates National Walk to School week at the end of May, and International Walk to School Month (October) in the UK. Each year, around two million primary school pupils take part. Local events are organised by school travel advisors and road safety departments, while the campaign organises national publicity.

The campaign also developed, in conjunction with Transport for London, the 'WOW' scheme, which rewards children who regularly walk or use sustainable means of transport to travel to school with a collectable badge. WOW originally stood for 'Walk On Wednesdays', but it developed into 'Walk Once a Week' / 'Walk On Weekdays', and was then abbreviated to 'WOW'.

In 2006, the campaign unveiled a new look, featuring the mascot 'Strider' - a bright orange foot with a smiling face.

== History of the campaign in Britain ==
1995 The very first Walk to School week was in 1995, with just five primary schools taking part in Hertfordshire as part of its contribution to hosting the Environmental Transport Association's Green Transport Week.

1996 The campaign was launched nationally by the Pedestrians Association (later Living Streets) and Travelwise, with the particular support of Dorset and Hertfordshire councils. Originally, Walk to School week was held during Child Safety Week.

1997 Walk to School week moved to its own dedicated week at the end of May. Campaigns began in Chicago and Los Angeles in the USA.

2000 The first ever International Walk to School Day was launched, with schools taking part in Great Britain, Ireland, Canada, USA, Cyprus, Gibraltar and the Isle of Man.

2003 International Walk to School day was extended into a week of activities. International Walk to School Week was supported by 33 countries including Belgium, USA, Canada, Australia and New Zealand.

In London, the Walk to School campaign launched its 'WOW' scheme ('Walk Once a Week') - a local scheme to reward pupils for walking all year round.

2004 The theme of the 2004 campaign was 'Fun and Friendship', highlighting the social benefits that parents and pupils reap from walking to school. In May 2004, children collected old shoes to send to developing countries. In October, the campaign borrowed red carpets from the NEC in Birmingham and the House of Lords, with the intention to make walking to school extra special for children from the schools that were involved in the launch.

2005 The 2005 theme was all about health. In May 2005, children took pieces of a skeleton jigsaw to school, and put it together in the playground. Almost 1.5 million children took part in the May Walk to School week. In October, schoolchildren gathered in Southwark, Devon, Manchester, Calderdale and Conwy to form giant heart shapes. The message was not only that Walking to School is good exercise for the heart, but also how much children love walking to school. This stunt received national TV coverage across the UK, featuring interviews with the Campaign Coordinator and some of the children involved.

2006 The 2006 theme was about the adventure and independence that pupils can derive from walking to school. The May Walk to School Week campaign featured ten giant jigsaws, each telling the story of a child's walk to school. Children took home a piece each, then put them together in the playground to assemble the whole story.

In Summer 2006, the campaign unveiled its new mascot: 'Strider', an orange foot with a smiling face, who was intended to encourage even more children to join the Walk to School programme, which was simultaneously rebranded as the national 'WOW' scheme.

October 2006 was the first ever International Walk to School Month. The month of activities meant it fitted around school holidays across the globe, as well as giving people time to, "Develop the walking habit". Over ten million pupils took part, across forty countries.

2016 International Walk to School Day took place on 5 October in 2016. The initiative has since been promoted annually.

== WOW Walk to School badges ==
In 2006, Living Streets launched its rebranded 'WOW' initiative for schools. ('WOW' initially stood for 'Walk On Wednesdays', then 'Walk Once a Week', and subsequently 'Walk On Weekdays'). Under this scheme, Living Streets has offered schools the opportunity to give out collectable badges to students, to reward active travel to school. Designs for the badges are chosen from artwork submitted by schoolchildren in a nationwide competition, which can receive more than 200,000 entries a year.

Typically, eleven badges are issued throughout the school year (with no badge provided for August, when the summer holidays take place in the UK). Each year, the badge collections have a different theme. Over the years, the WOW badge series have included the following themes:

- 2006-07: Animals
- 2007-08: Seasons
- 2008-09: Landmarks
- 2009-10: Why I Love my Walk to School

(This was the final series to use an enamel safety-pin style design, before Living Streets transitioned to issuing recycled plastic badges).

- 2010-11: Record Breakers
- 2011-12: Go for Gold

(A sports theme was chosen to coincide with the 2012 Summer Olympics and Paralympics in London).

- 2012-13: All Around the World

(An online 'Travel Tracker' was launched in 2012 to record children's involvement in the scheme, replacing the earlier paper-based version).

- 2013-14: A Journey Through Time
- 2014-15: When I Grow Up
- 2015-16: My Healthy Planet
- 2016-17: Our Neighbourhood

(For this series, a mobile app was launched, which enabled the badges to be scanned and 'brought to life' with animations).

- 2017-18: Walk the Americas
- 2018-19: Walk the Seasons
- 2019-20: Inventions that Changed the World

(Since 2019, the badges have been manufactured in Cornwall from lightweight recycled plastic materials).

- 2020-21: Wonders of the World

(Seven badges were issued in this series, with the schedule disrupted by the Covid-19 pandemic and school lockdowns).

- 2021-22: Walk for the World

(Nine badges were issued in this series, beginning with the November 2021 edition, which was scheduled to coincide with the date of the COP26 conference, with the intention of heightening children's awareness of environmental issues).

- 2022-23: Walk Through Time
- 2023-24: The British Nature Walk
- 2024-25: Walk with Imagination
- 2025-26: Walk with Joy
- 2026-27: Walk the Senses

=== Additional badges ===
Badges featuring the 'Strider' mascot can be given out to children as extra rewards.

'WOW Ambassador' badges are available in three colours: pink, orange and green. These badges can be issued to children who are willing to help out with the administration of the WOW scheme at their school.

== See also ==
- Crossing guard
- Pedestrian crossing
- Walkability
- Walk Safely to School Day
- Walk to Work Day
- Walking audit
- Walking bus
