= Street =

Public thoroughfare in a built environment

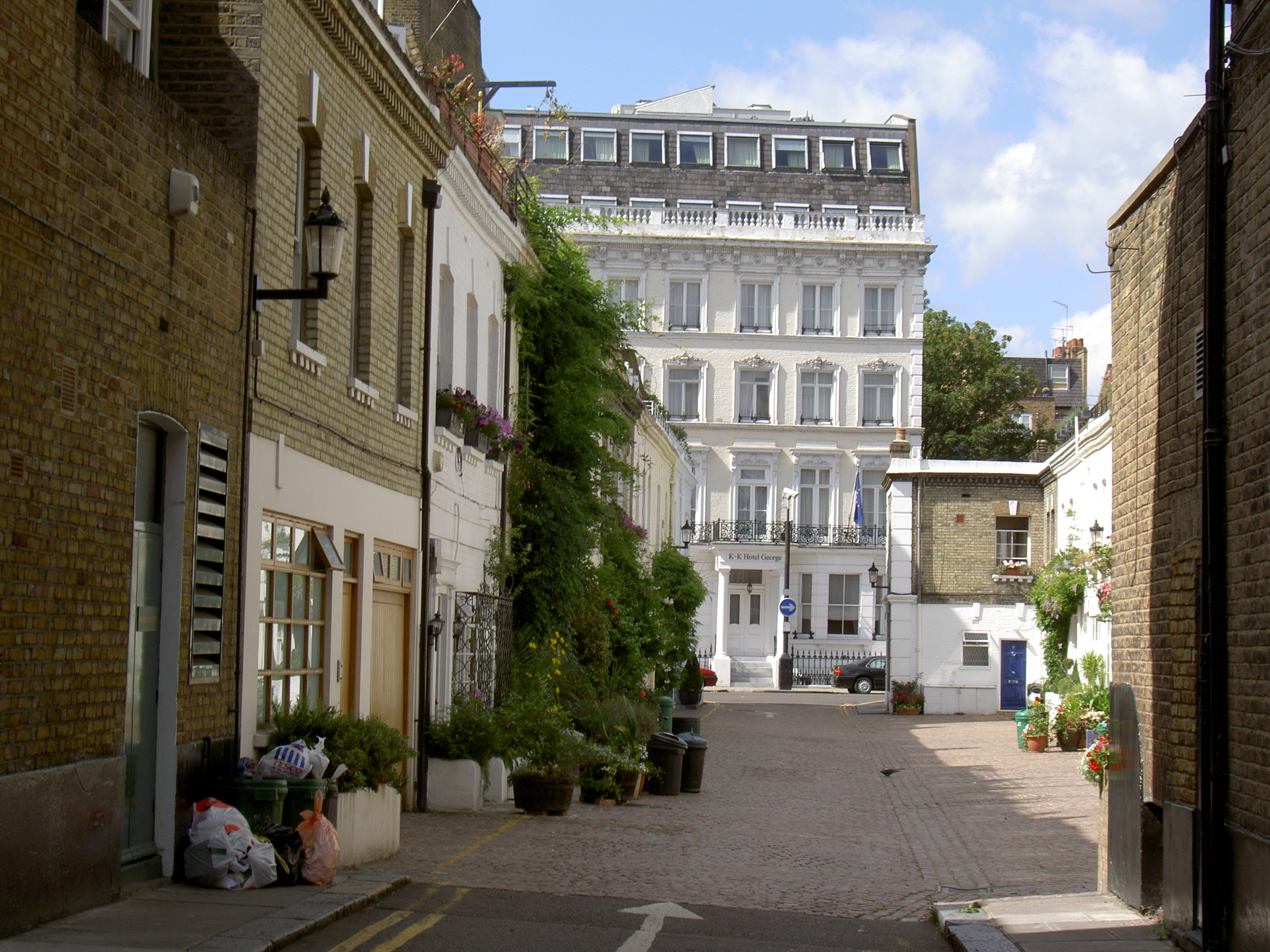
Service street ("mews") in the Royal Borough of Kensington and Chelsea in London. Mews are typically found at the back of older rows of townhouses, with a more elegant street in the front.

A street is a public thoroughfare in a city, town or village, typically lined with buildings on one or both sides. Streets often include pavements (sidewalks), pedestrian crossings, and sometimes amenities like streetlights or benches. A street can be as simple as a level patch of dirt, but is more often paved with a hard, durable surface such as tarmac, concrete, cobblestone or brick. It can be designed for both social activity and movement.

Originally, the word street simply meant a paved road (Latin: via strata). The word street is still sometimes used informally as a synonym for road, for example in connection with the ancient Watling Street, but city residents and urban planners draw a significant modern distinction: a road's main function is transportation, while streets facilitate public interaction. Examples of streets include pedestrian streets, alleys, and city-centre streets too crowded for motor vehicles to pass. Conversely, highways and motorways are types of roads, but few would refer to them as streets.

When a street needs to support heavy through traffic, it can come to resemble a road. Such a street-road combination is known as a stroad.

== Etymology ==
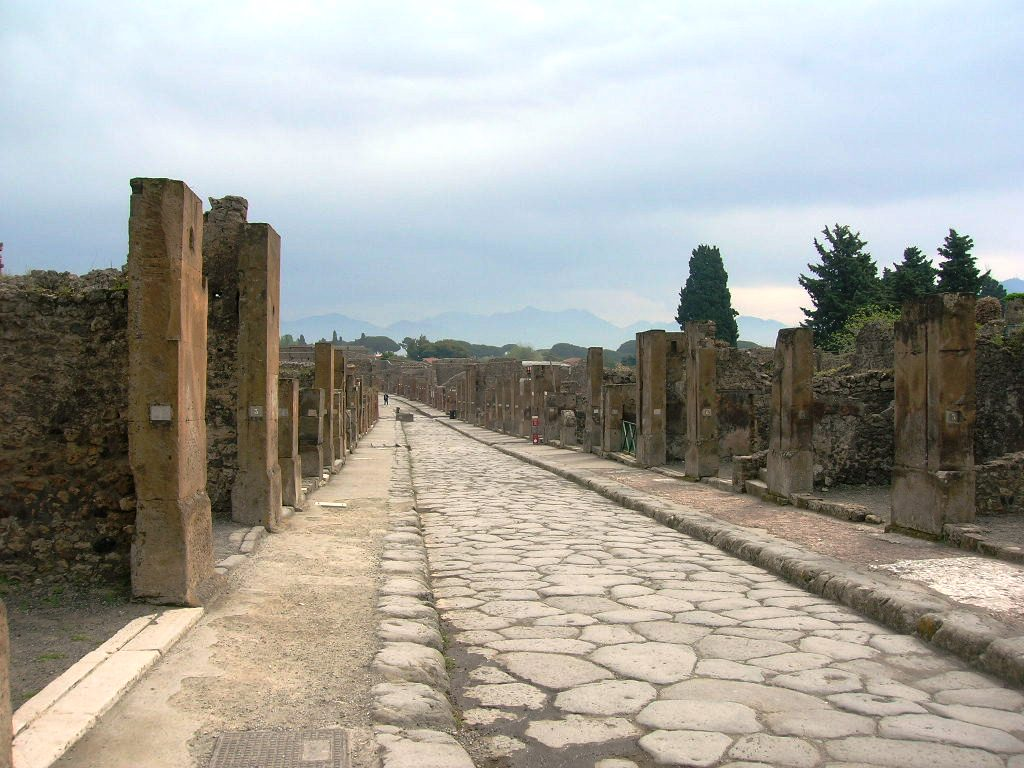
Roman street in Pompeii. Its east–west-oriented Decumanus Maximus

The word street has its origins in the Latin strata (meaning "paved road" – an abbreviation from via strata); it is thus related to stratum and stratification. The first recorded use of word stratæ referring to the road has been made by Eutropius. Ancient Greek stratos means army: Greeks originally built roads to move their armies. Old English applied the word to Roman roads in Britain such as Ermine Street, Watling Street, etc. Later it acquired a dialectical meaning of "straggling village", which were often laid out on the verges of Roman roads and these settlements often became named Stretton. In the Middle Ages, a road was a way people travelled, with street applied specifically to paved ways.

== Role in the built environment ==
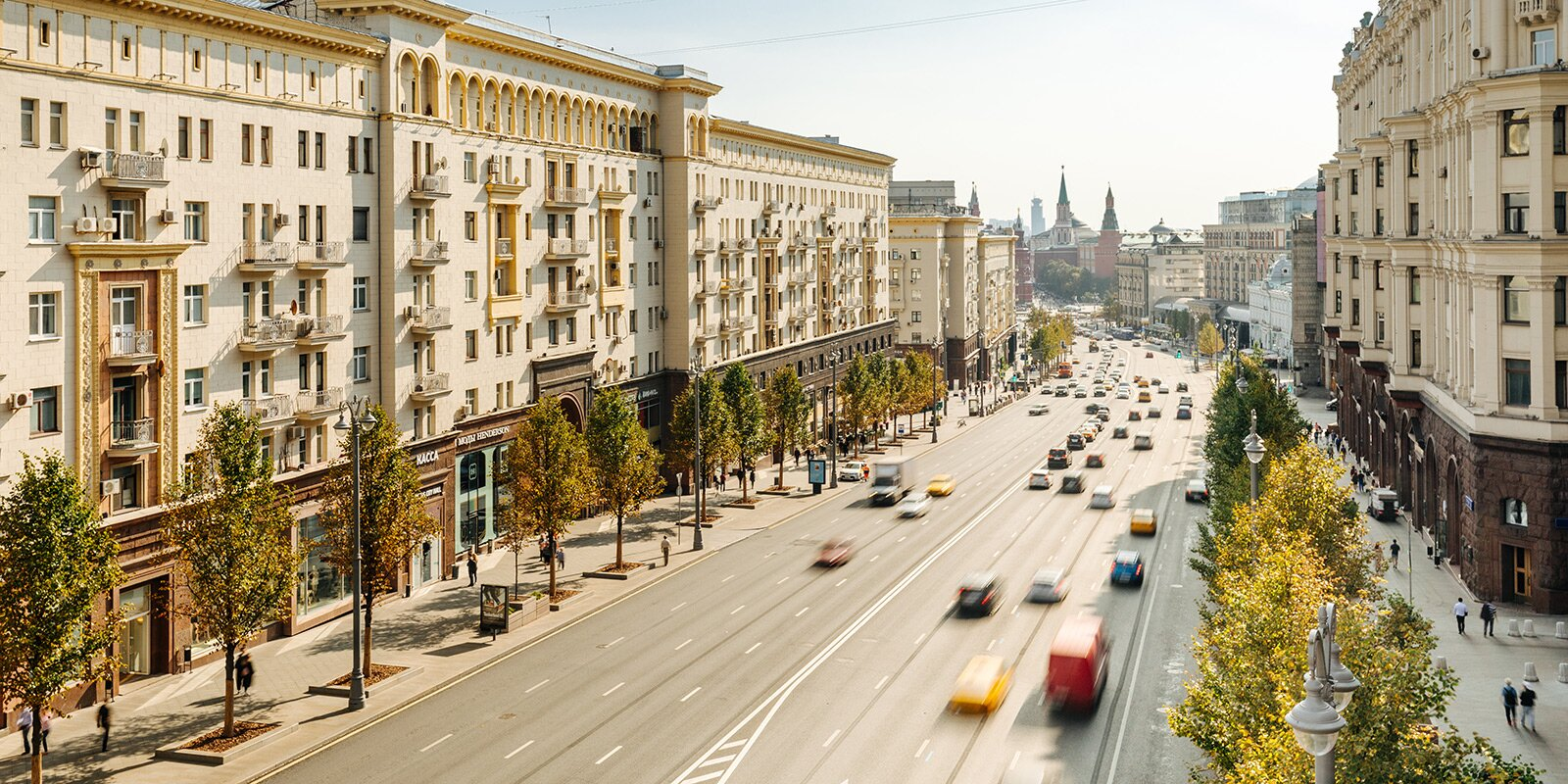
Tverskaya Street the main radial street in Moscow.

The street is a public easement, one of the few shared between all sorts of people. As a component of the built environment as ancient as human habitation, the street sustains numerous activities vital to civilization.

Streets can be loosely categorized as main streets and side streets. Main streets are usually broad with a relatively high level of activity. Commerce and public interaction are more visible on main streets, and vehicles may use them for longer-distance travel. Side streets are quieter, often residential in use and character, and may be used for parking.

=== Circulation ===
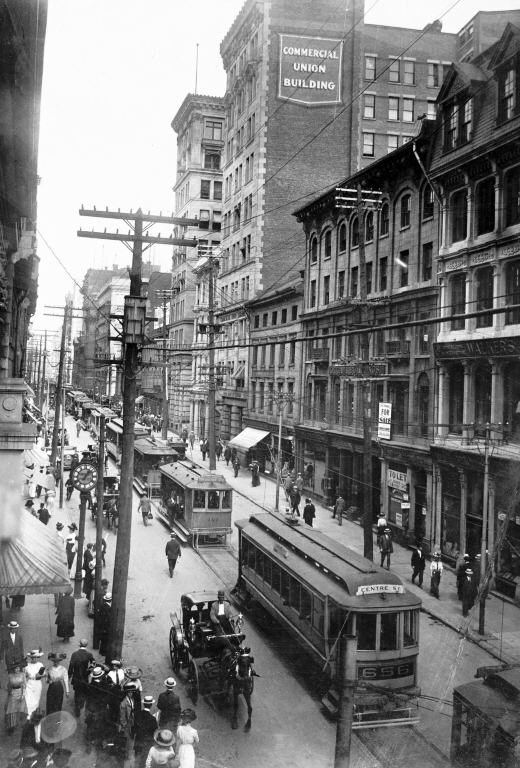
Rue Saint-Jacques, a street in Montreal, 1910

Circulation, or less broadly, transportation, is perhaps a street's most visible use, and certainly among the most important. The unrestricted movement of people and goods within a city is essential to its commerce and vitality, and streets provide the physical space for this activity.

In the interest of order and efficiency, an effort may be made to segregate different types of traffic. This is usually done by carving a road through the middle for motorists, reserving pavements on either side for pedestrians; other arrangements allow for streetcars, trolleys, and even wastewater and rainfall runoff ditches (common in Japan and India). In the mid-20th century, as the automobile threatened to overwhelm city streets with pollution and ghastly accidents, many urban theorists came to see this segregation as not only helpful but necessary in order to maintain mobility.

Le Corbusier, for one, perceived an ever-stricter segregation of traffic as an essential affirmation of social order—a desirable, and ultimately inevitable, expression of modernity. To this end, proposals were advanced to build "vertical streets" where road vehicles, pedestrians, and trains would each occupy their own levels. Such an arrangement, it was said, would allow for even denser development in the future.

These plans were never implemented comprehensively, a fact which today's urban theorists regard as fortunate for vitality and diversity. Rather, vertical segregation is applied on a piecemeal basis, as in sewers, utility poles, depressed highways, elevated railways, common utility ducts, the extensive complex of underground malls surrounding Tokyo Station and the Ōtemachi subway station, the elevated pedestrian skyway networks of Minneapolis and Calgary, the underground cities of Atlanta and Montreal, and the multilevel streets in Chicago.

Transportation is often misunderstood to be the defining characteristic, or even the sole purpose, of a street. This has not been the case since the word "street" came to be limited to urban situations, and even in the automobile age, is still demonstrably false. A street may be temporarily blocked to all through traffic in order to secure the space for other uses, such as a street fair, a flea market, children at play, filming a movie, or construction work. Many streets are bracketed by bollards or Jersey barriers so as to keep out vehicles. These measures are often taken in a city's busiest areas, the "destination" districts, when the volume of activity outgrows the capacity of private passenger vehicles to support it. A feature universal to all streets is a human-scale design that gives its users the space and security to feel engaged in their surroundings, whatever through traffic may pass.

==== Vehicular traffic ====
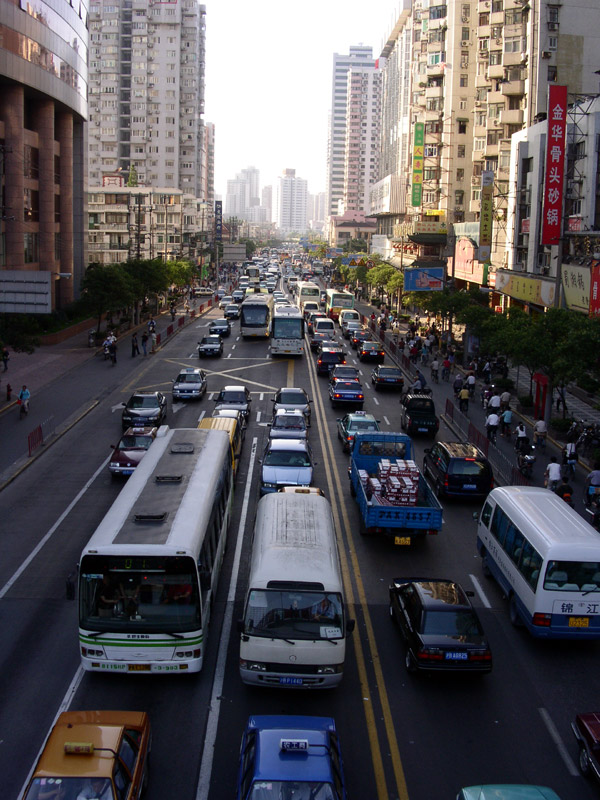
A street full of vehicles in Shanghai

Despite this, the operator of a motor vehicle may (incompletely) regard a street as merely a thoroughfare for vehicular travel or parking. As far as concerns the driver, a street can be one-way or two-way: vehicles on one-way streets may travel in only one direction, while those on two-way streets may travel both ways. One way streets typically have signs reading "ONE WAY" and an arrow showing the direction of allowed travel. Most two-way streets are wide enough for at least two lanes of traffic.

Which lane is for which direction of traffic depends on what country the street is located in. On broader two-way streets, there is often a centre line marked down the middle of the street separating those lanes on which vehicular traffic goes in one direction from other lanes in which traffic goes in the opposite direction. Occasionally, there may be a median strip separating lanes of opposing traffic. If there is more than one lane going in one direction on a main street, these lanes may be separated by intermittent lane lines, marked on the street pavement. Side streets often do not have centre lines or lane lines.

==== Parking for vehicles ====
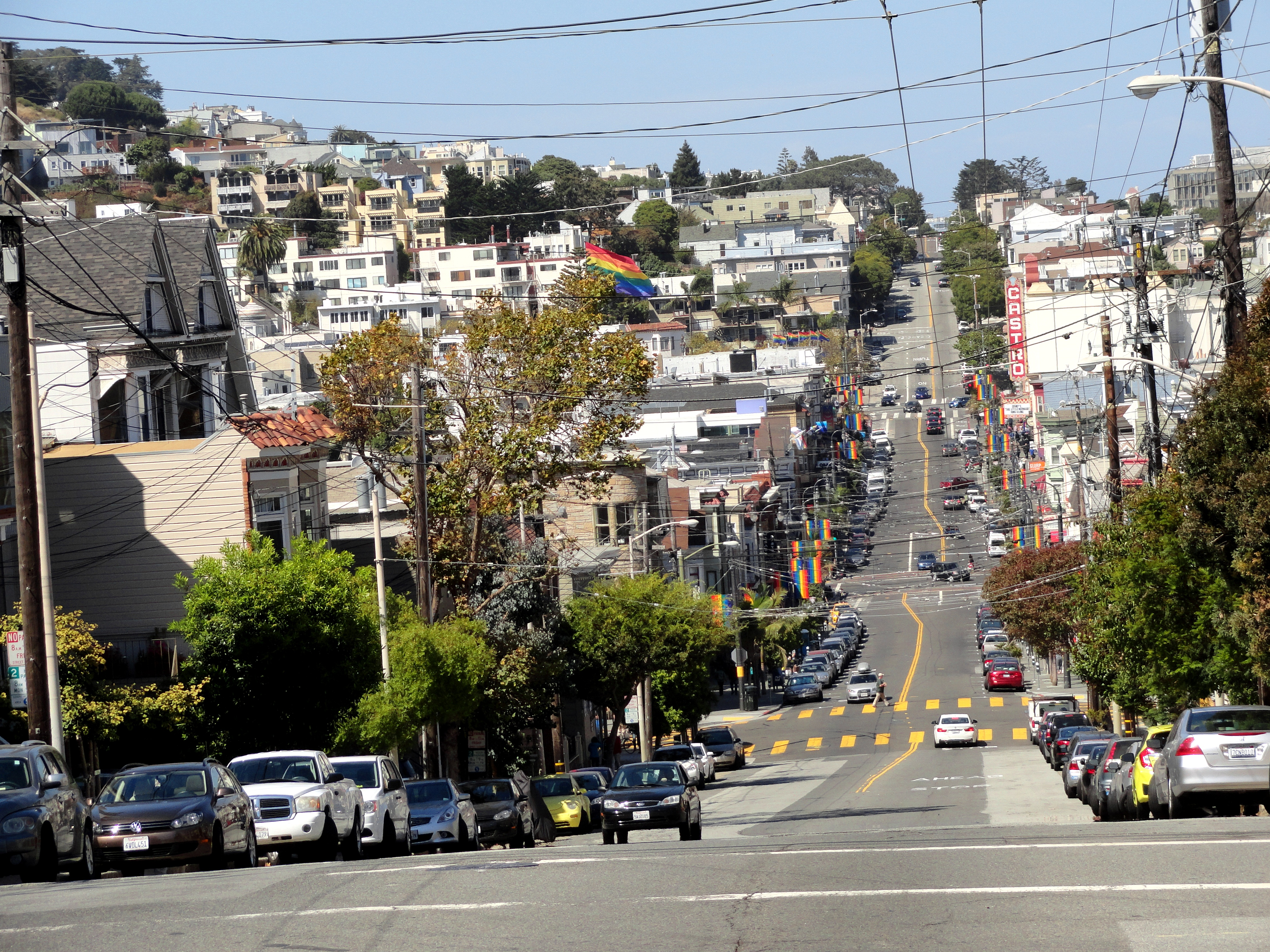
Street parking on Castro Street in San Francisco

Many streets, especially side streets in residential areas, have an extra lane's width on one or both sides for parallel parking. Most minor side streets allowing free parallel parking do not have pavement markings designating the parking lane. Main streets more often have parking lanes marked. Some streets are too busy or narrow for parking on the side. Sometimes parking on the sides of streets is allowed only at certain times. Curbside signs often state regulations about parking. Some streets, particularly in business areas, may have parking meters into which coins must be paid to allow parking in the adjacent space for a limited time. Other parking meters work on a credit card and ticket basis or pay and display. Parking lane markings on the pavement may designate the meter corresponding to a parking space. Some wide streets with light traffic allow angle parking or herringbone parking.

==== Sidewalk and bicycle traffic ====
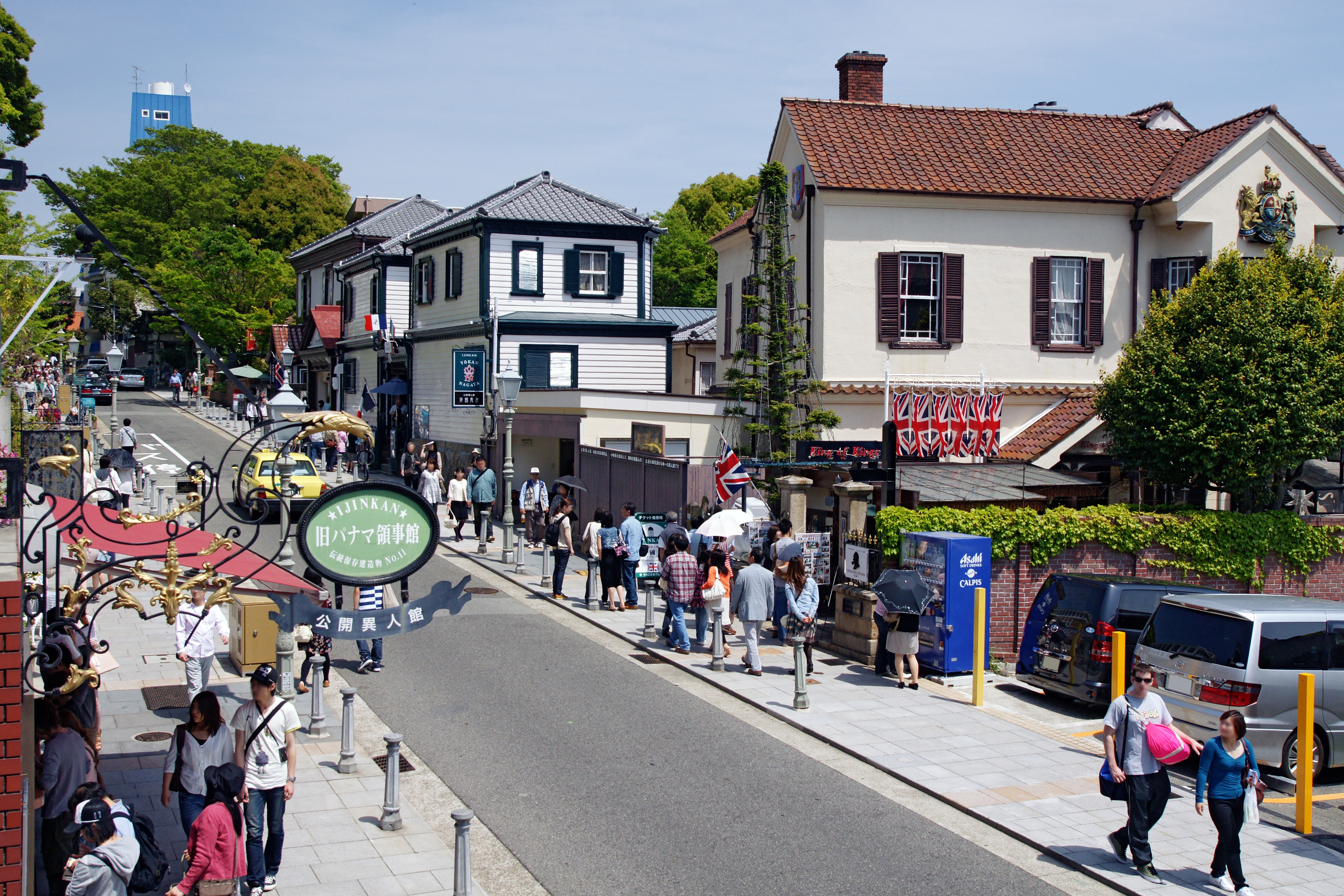
Kitano Street in Kobe, Hyogo, Japan.

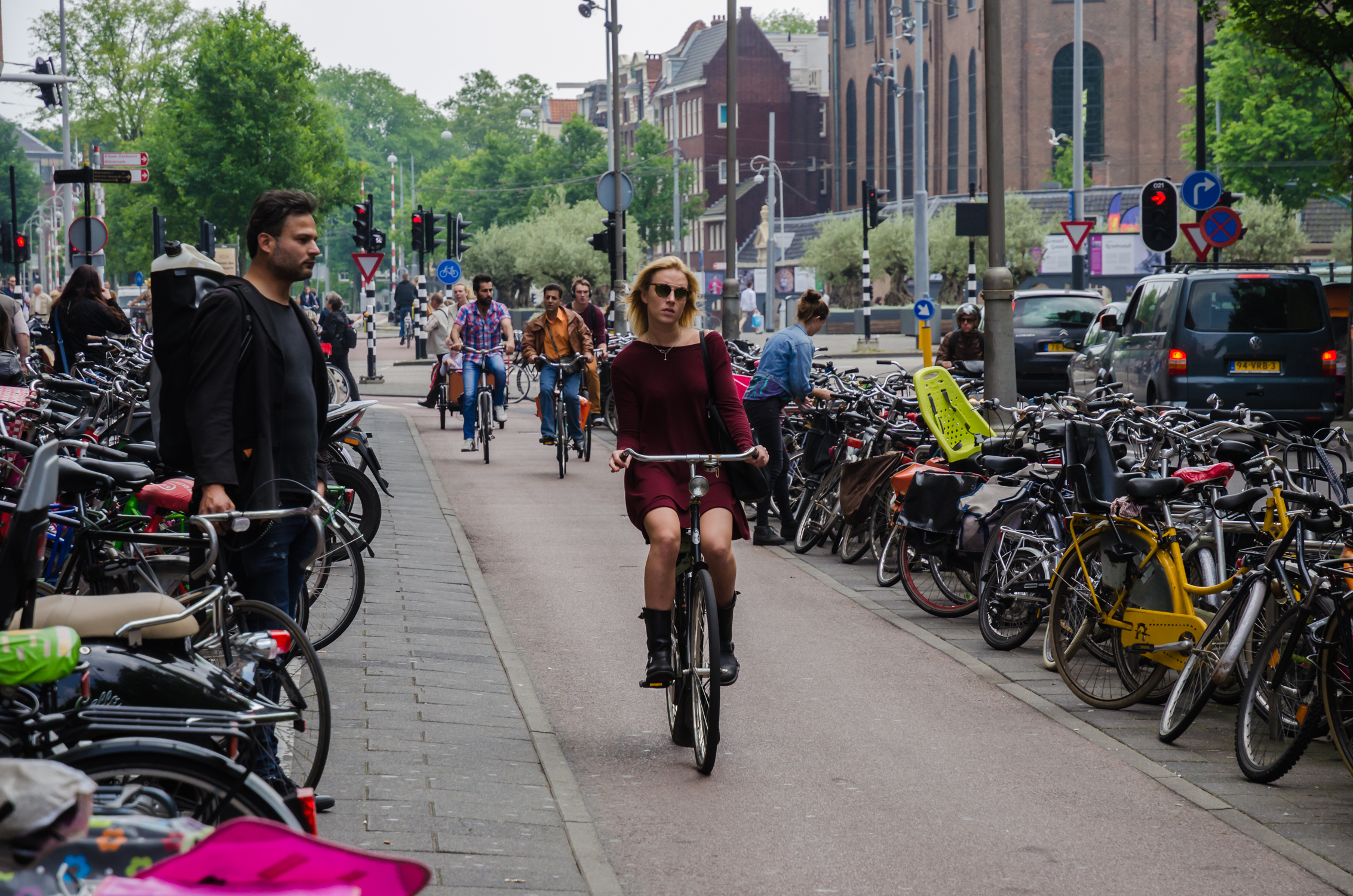
Safe from traffic for cycling along a fully segregated Fietspad, properly designed cycling infrastructure in Amsterdam.

Sidewalks (US usage) or pavements (UK usage) are often located alongside on one or usually both sides of the street within the public land strips beyond the curbs. Sidewalks serve a traffic purpose, by making walking easier and more attractive, but they also serve a social function, allowing neighbors to meet and interact on their walks. They also can foster economic activity, such as window shopping and sidewalk cafes. Some studies have found that shops on streets with sidewalks get more customers than similar shops without sidewalks.

An important element of sidewalk design is accessibility for persons with disabilities. Features that make sidewalks more accessible include curb ramps, tactile paving and accessible traffic signals. The Americans with Disabilities Act requires accessibility improvement on new and reconstructed streets within the US.

In most jurisdictions, bicycles are legally allowed to use streets, and required to follow the same traffic laws as motor vehicle traffic. Where the volume of bicycle traffic warrants and available right-of-way allows, provisions may be made to separate cyclists from motor vehicle traffic. Wider lanes may be provided next to the curb, or shoulders may be provided. Bicycle lanes may be used on busy streets to provide some separation between bicycle traffic and motor vehicle traffic.

The bicycle lane may be placed between the travel lanes and the parking lanes, between the parking lanes and the curb, or for increased safety for cyclists, between curb and sidewalk. These poorer designs can lead to Dooring incidents and are unsafe for cycling.

A more sensible design is found in the Netherlands with a Protected Bicycle Path totally separate from the traffic which is safe for cycling.

==== Tramlines ====
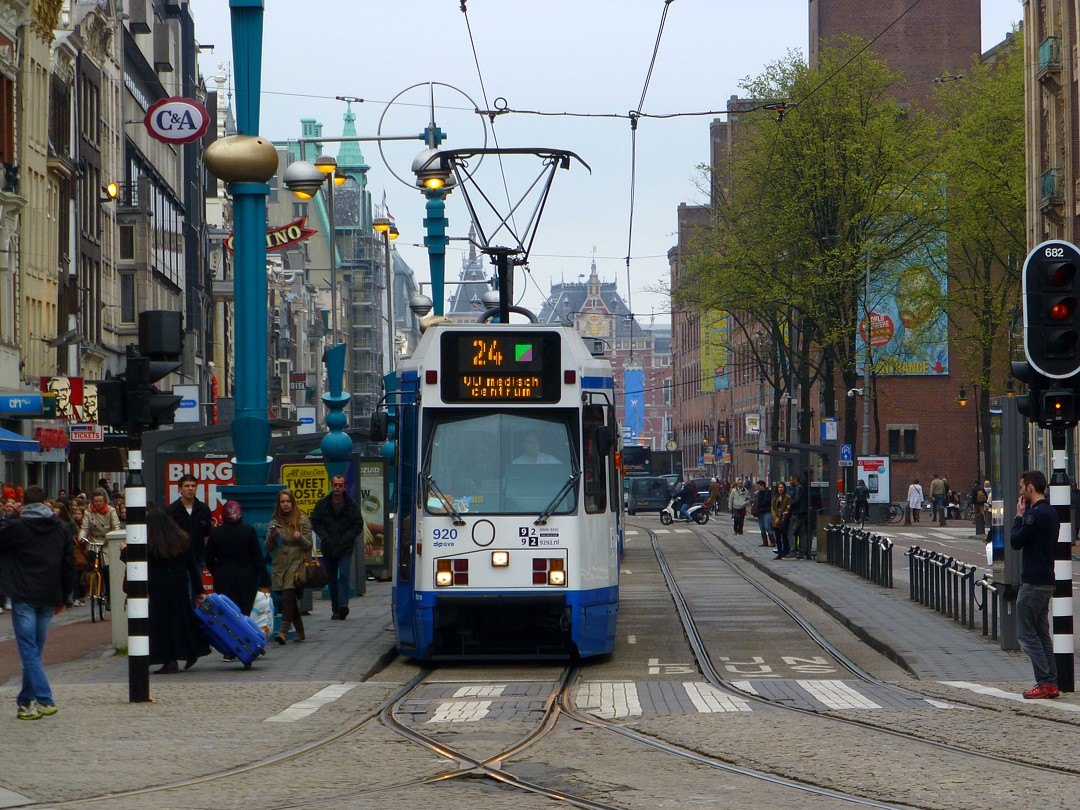
Damrak, in Amsterdam with a tram, Fietspad and pavement

Trams are generally considered to be environmentally friendly with tramlines running in streets with a combination of tram lanes or separate alignments are used, sometimes on a segregated right of way. Signalling and effective braking reduce the risk of a tram accident.

=== Vehicular amenities and roadside hardware ===
Often, a curb (British English: kerb) is used to separate the vehicle traffic lanes from the adjacent pavement area and where people on bicycles are considered properly are used to separate cycling from traffic as well. Street signs, parking meters, bicycle stands, benches, traffic signals, and street lights are often found adjacent to streets. They may be behind the sidewalk, or between the sidewalk and the curb.

==== Landscaping ====
There may be a road verge (a strip of grass or other vegetation) between the carriageway (English: roadway) and the pavement on either side of the street on which grass or trees are often grown there for landscaping. These are often placed for beautification but are increasingly being used to control stormwater.

=== Utilities ===
Although primarily used for traffic, streets are important corridors for utilities such as electric power; communications such as telephone, cable television and fiber optic lines; storm and sanitary sewers; and natural gas lines.

=== Street numbering ===
Practically all public streets in Western countries and the majority elsewhere (though not in Japan; see Japanese addressing system) are given a street or road name, or at least a number, to identify them and any addresses located along the streets. Alleys, in some places, do not have names. The length of a lot of land along a street is referred to as the frontage of the lot.

=== Interaction ===
A street may assume the role of a town square for its regulars. Jane Jacobs, an economist and prominent urbanist, wrote extensively on the ways that interaction among the people who live and work on a particular street—"eyes on the street"—can reduce crime, encourage the exchange of ideas, and generally make the world a better place.

=== Identity ===
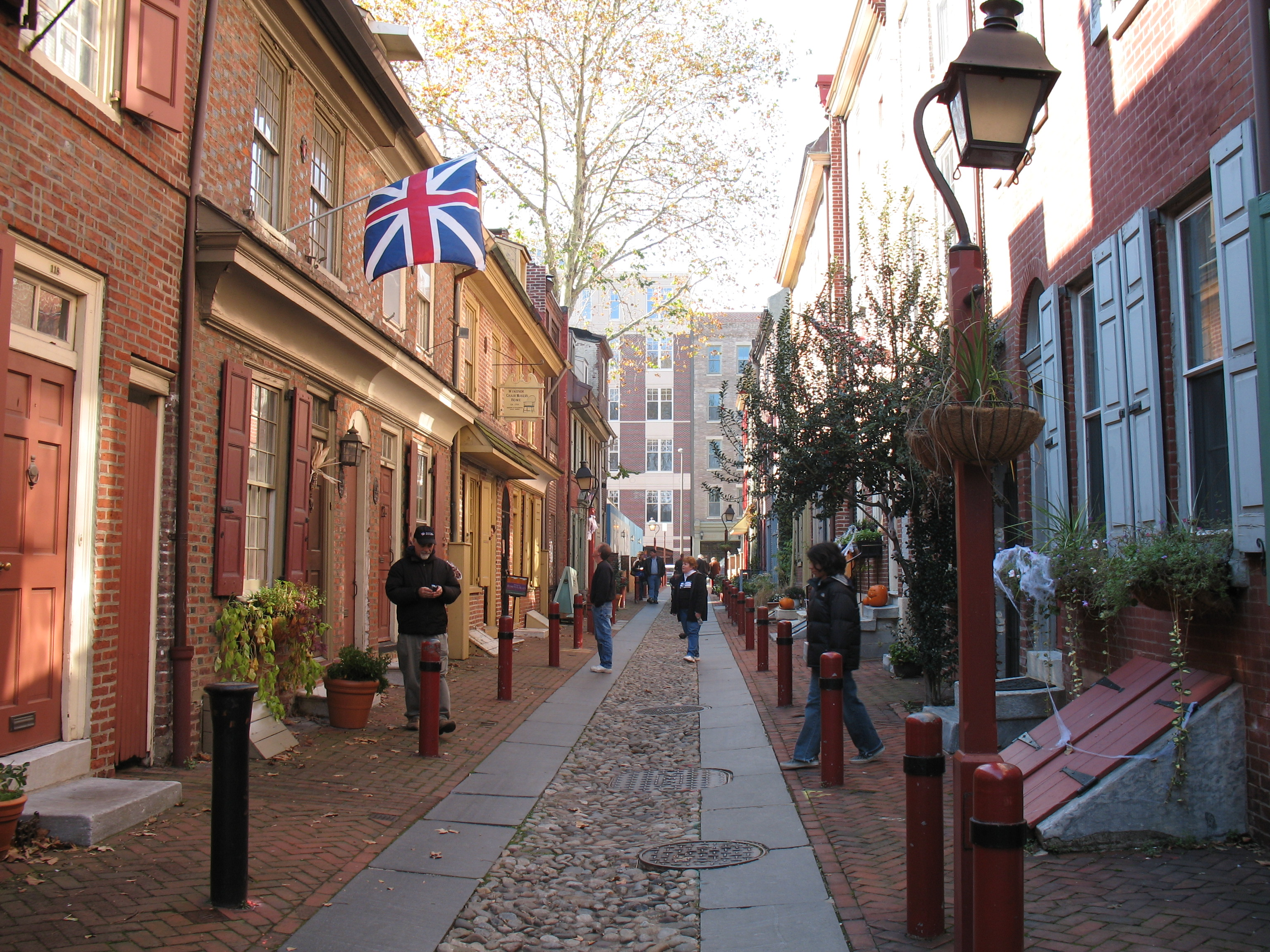
Pedestrians walking along Elfreth's Alley, Philadelphia

A street can often serve as the catalyst for the neighborhood's prosperity, culture and solidarity. New Orleans' Bourbon Street is famous not only for its active nightlife but also for its role as the centre of the city's French Quarter. Similarly, the Bowery has at various times been New York City's theater district, red-light district, skid row, restaurant supply district, and the centre of the nation's underground punk scene. Madison Avenue and Fleet Street are so strongly identified with their respective most famous types of commerce, that their names are sometimes applied to firms located elsewhere. Other streets mark divisions between neighborhoods of a city. For example, Yonge Street divides Toronto into east and west sides, and East Capitol Street divides Washington, D.C. into north and south.

Some streets are associated with the beautification of a town or city. Greenwood, Mississippi's Grand Boulevard was once named one of America's ten most beautiful streets by the U.S. Chambers of Commerce and the Garden Clubs of America. The 1,000 oak trees lining Grand Boulevard were planted in 1916 by Sally Humphreys Gwin, a charter member of the Greenwood Garden Club. In 1950, Gwin received a citation from the National Congress of the Daughters of the American Revolution in recognition of her work in the conservation of trees.

Streets also tend to aggregate establishments of similar nature and character. East 9th Street in Manhattan, for example, offers a cluster of Japanese restaurants, clothing stores, and cultural venues. In Washington, D.C., 17th Street and P Street are well known as epicenters of the city's (relatively small) gay culture. Many cities have a Radio Row or Restaurant Row. Like in Philadelphia there is a small street called Jewelers' row giving the identity of a "Diamond district". This phenomenon is the subject of urban location theory in economics. In Cleveland, Ohio, East 4th Street has become restaurant row for Cleveland. On East 4th is Michael Symon's Lola Bistro and other restaurants.

== As distinct from other spaces ==
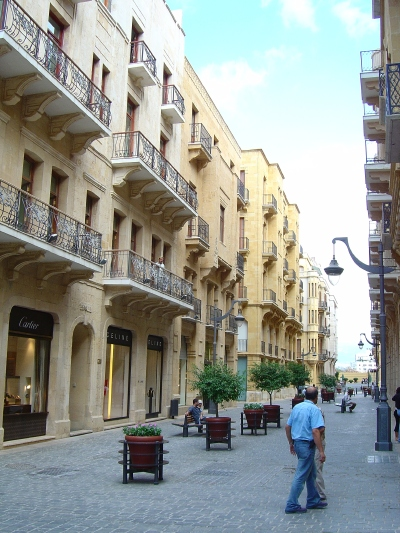
Centre Ville, Beirut, Lebanon

A road, like a street, is often paved and used for travel. However, a street is characterized by the degree and quality of the street life which it facilitates, whereas a road serves primarily as a through-passage for road vehicles or (less frequently) for pedestrians. Buskers, beggars, boulevardiers, patrons of pavement cafés, peoplewatchers, streetwalkers, and a diversity of other characters are habitual users of a street; the same people would not typically be found on a road. A stroad is a thoroughfare that mixes - often unhappily - the characteristics of a street and a road.

In rural and suburban environments where street life is rarer, people frequently use the terms "street" and "road" interchangeably. Still, even here, what is called a "street" is usually a smaller thoroughfare, such as a road within a housing development feeding directly into individual driveways. In the last half of the 20th century planners of suburban streets often abandoned the tradition of a rigid, rectangular grid, and instead designed systems to discourage through-traffic. This and other traffic calming methods provided quiet for families and play space for children within a streetscape. Adolescent suburbanites find, in attenuated form, the amenities of street life in shopping malls where vehicles are forbidden.

A town square or plaza is a little more like a street, but a town square is rarely paved with asphalt and may not make any concessions for through-traffic at all.

=== Nomenclature ===
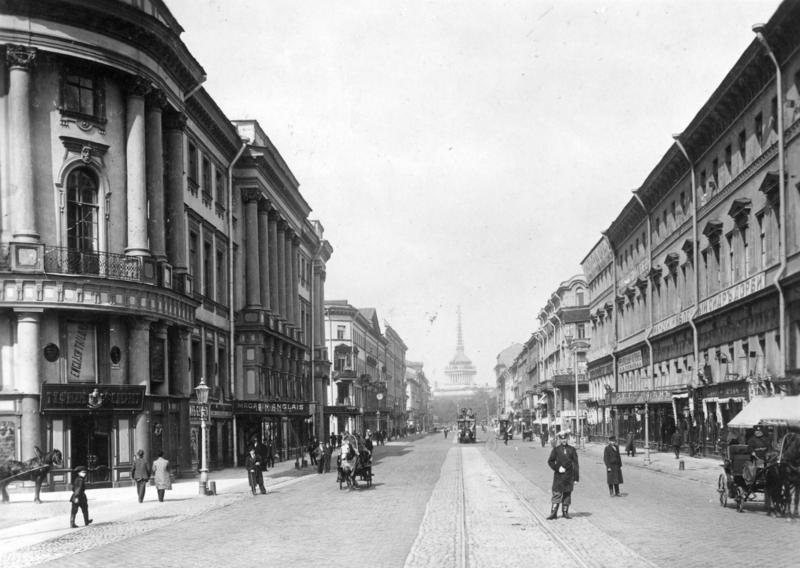
Nevsky Prospekt, the main street in the city of St. Petersburg, 1901

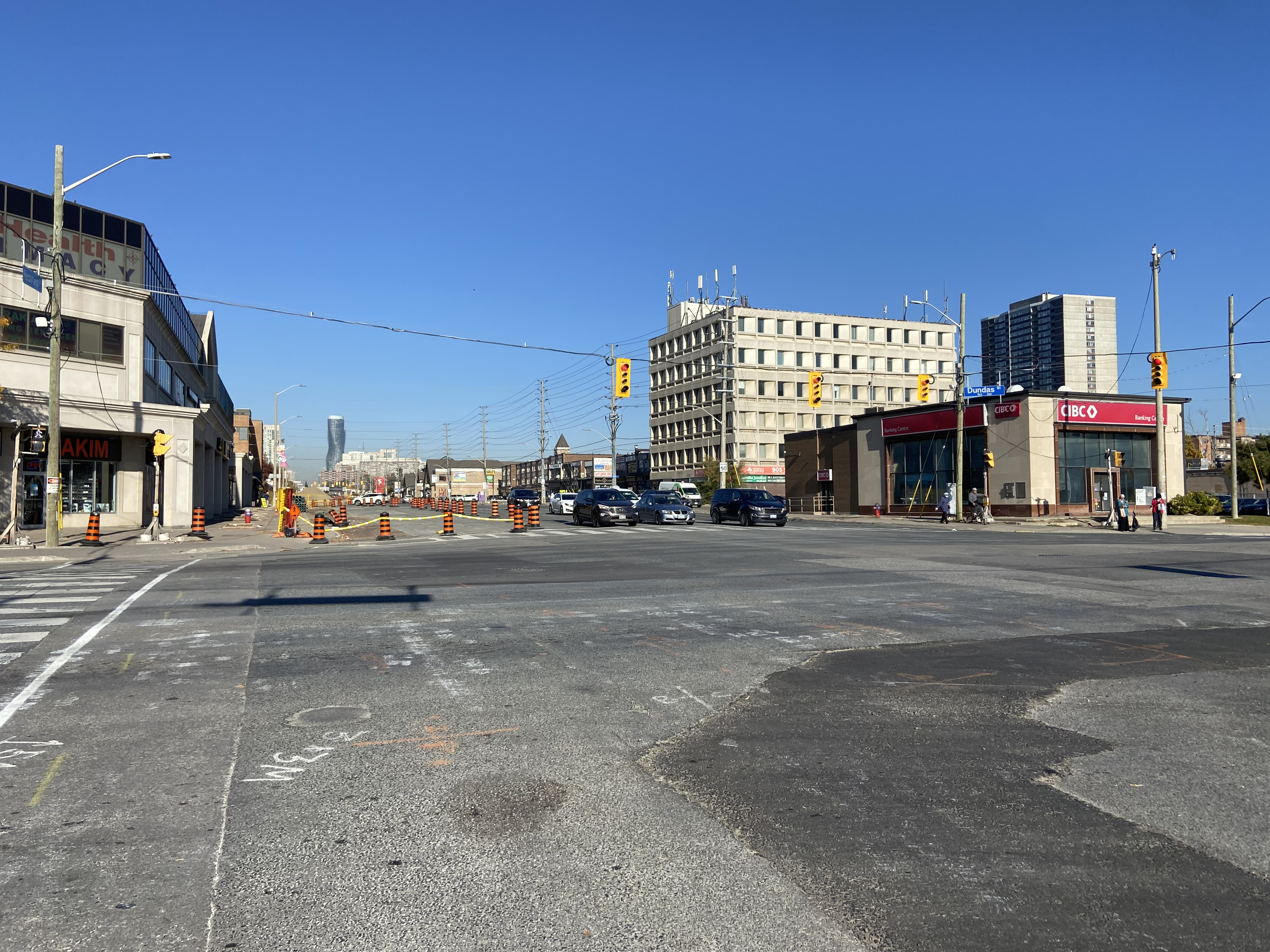
Hurontario Street in Mississauga, Ontario, Canada, is commonly referred to by its former highway number.

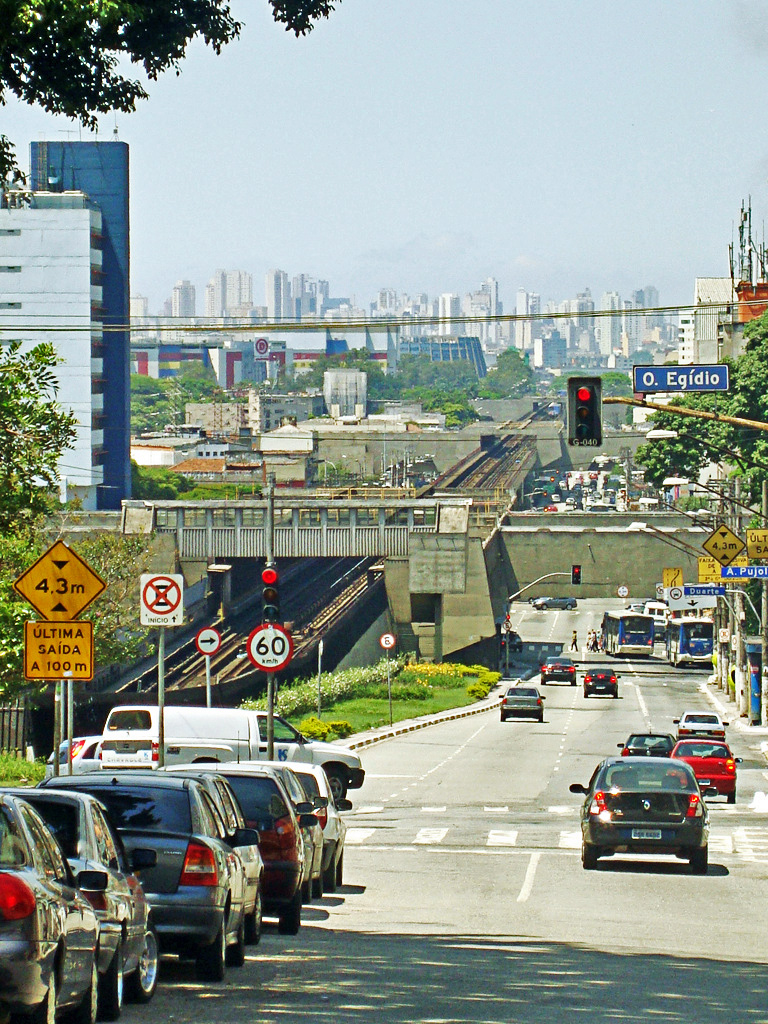
An avenue in São Paulo.

There is a haphazard relationship, at best, between a thoroughfare's function and its name. For example, London's Abbey Road serves all the vital functions of a street, despite its name, and locals are more apt to refer to the "street" outside than the "road". A desolate road in rural Montana, on the other hand, may bear a sign proclaiming it "Davidson Street", but this does not make it a "street" except in the original sense of a paved road.

In the United Kingdom the inhabitants of many towns will refer to their main thoroughfare as the High Street (in the United States and Canada it would be called the Main Street—however, occasionally "Main Street" in a city or town is a street other than the de facto main thoroughfare), and many of the ways leading off it will be named "Road" despite the urban setting. Thus the town's so-called "Roads" will actually be more like streets than like road.

Some streets may even be called "highways", even though they may carry no highway designation at all: This may arise when an historic road that was built to connect distant towns was named a "street" but originally never was in the truest sense. Some roads of this type which later became designated as numbered highways, became identified as said highway and may continue to colloquially be labelled as such from force of habit even if sections of it are subsequently urbanized and become an actual street and has its highway status decommissioned. Hurontario Street in Mississauga, Ontario, Canada (which was formerly Ontario Highway 10, but predates it), is an example of this.

In some other English-speaking countries, such as Australia and New Zealand, cities are often divided by a main "Road", with "Streets" leading from this "Road", or the cities are divided by thoroughfares known as "Streets" or "Roads" with no apparent differentiation between the two. In Auckland in New Zealand, for example, the main shopping precinct is located around Queen Street and Karangahape Road.

Streets have existed for as long as humans have lived in permanent settlements (see civilization). However, the development of modern civilization in much of the New World was driven by transportation provided by motor vehicles. In some parts of the English-speaking world, such as North America, many think of the street as a thoroughfare for vehicular traffic first and foremost. In this view, pedestrian traffic is incidental to the street's purpose; a street consists of a thoroughfare running through the middle (in essence, a road), and may or may not have pavements (or sidewalks) along the sides.

In an even narrower sense, some may think of a street as only the vehicle-driven and parking part of the thoroughfare. Thus, sidewalks (pavements) and road verges would not be thought of as part of the street. A mother may tell her toddlers, "Don't go out into the street, so you don't get hit by a car."

Among urban residents of the English-speaking world, the word "street" appears to carry only some of its original etymological connotations (i.e., the facilitation of traffic as a prime purpose, and "street life" as an incidental benefit). For instance, a New York Times writer lets casually slip the observation that automobile-laden Houston Street, in lower Manhattan, is "a street that can hardly be called 'street' anymore, transformed years ago into an eight-lane raceway that alternately resembles a Nascar event and a parking lot." Published in the paper's Metro section, the article evidently presumes an audience with an innate grasp of the modern urban role of the street. To the readers of the Metro section, vehicular traffic does not reinforce, but rather detracts from, the essential "street-ness" of a street.

At least one map has been made to illustrate the geography of naming conventions for thoroughfares - comparing and contrasting "avenue", "boulevard", "circle", "road", "street", and other labels.

== Culture ==
Streets may be used as cultural spaces, for socializing and street parties, or for public festivals.

In India, some cities have designated one or more streets as "happy street" or "fun street", closing them for motor traffic for a few hours or a day, in order to make it possible for the inhabitants to use their street for recreational activities. Cities implementing this initiative include Kolkata Madurai, Visakhapatnam and Bangalore.

In the United States, "open street" events have been arranged in Detroit and New York City.

== See also ==
- Alley
- Built environment
- City bicycle
- Complete streets
- Cycling infrastructure
- Intersection
- Lane; Green lane (road)
- Living street
- Manual for Streets (in the UK)
- Spreuerhofstraße (world's narrowest street)
- Pedestrian-friendly
- Pedestrian street, Auto-free zone
- Protected intersection
- Road
- Shopping street
- Street furniture
- Street reclamation
- Street suffix
- Street Vendor
- Trams
- Urban car
- Woonerf
