= Living street =

Traffic calming in spaces shared between road users

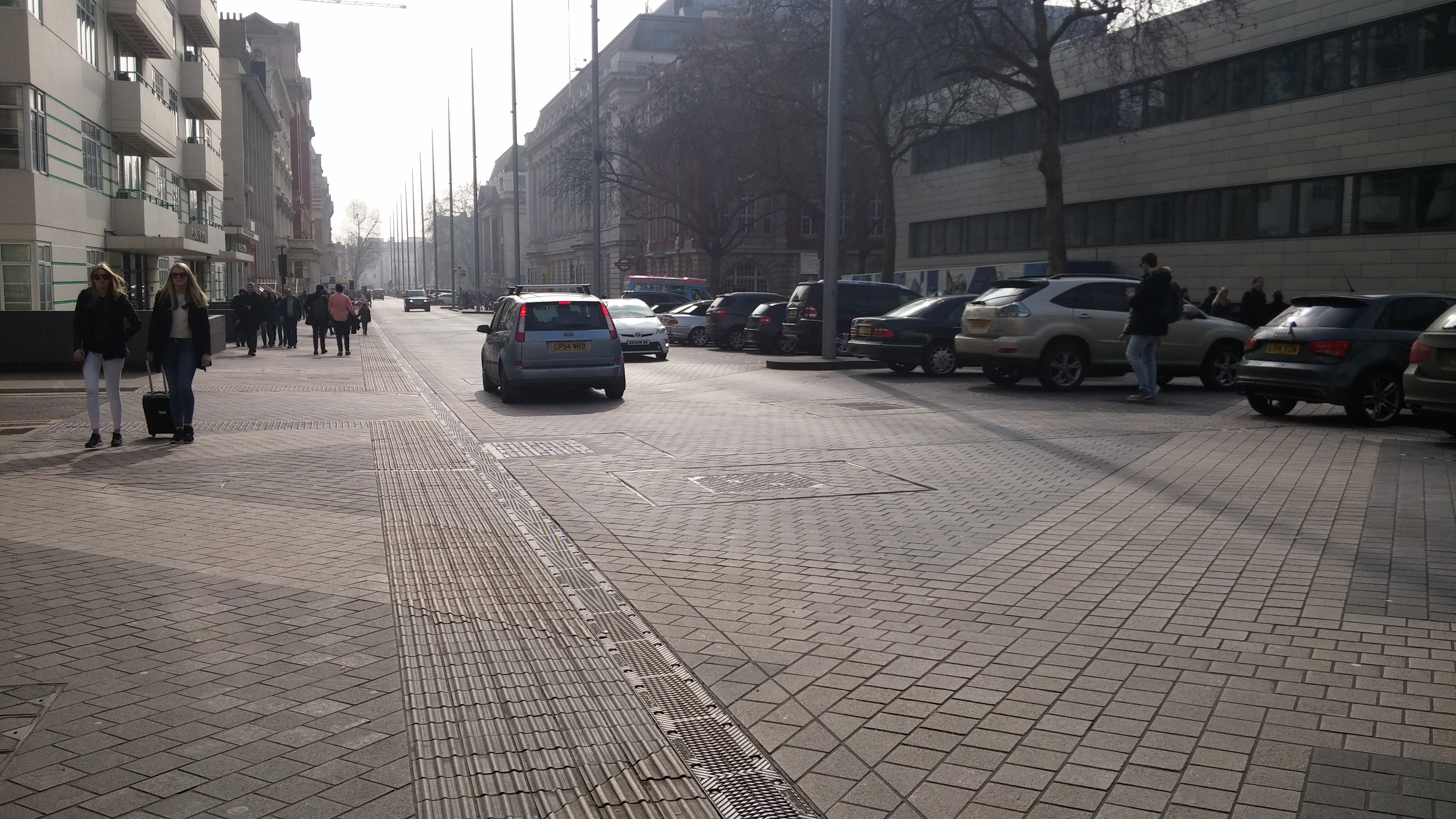
Exhibition Road in London, England, where pedestrian and road traffic areas are only partially delineated

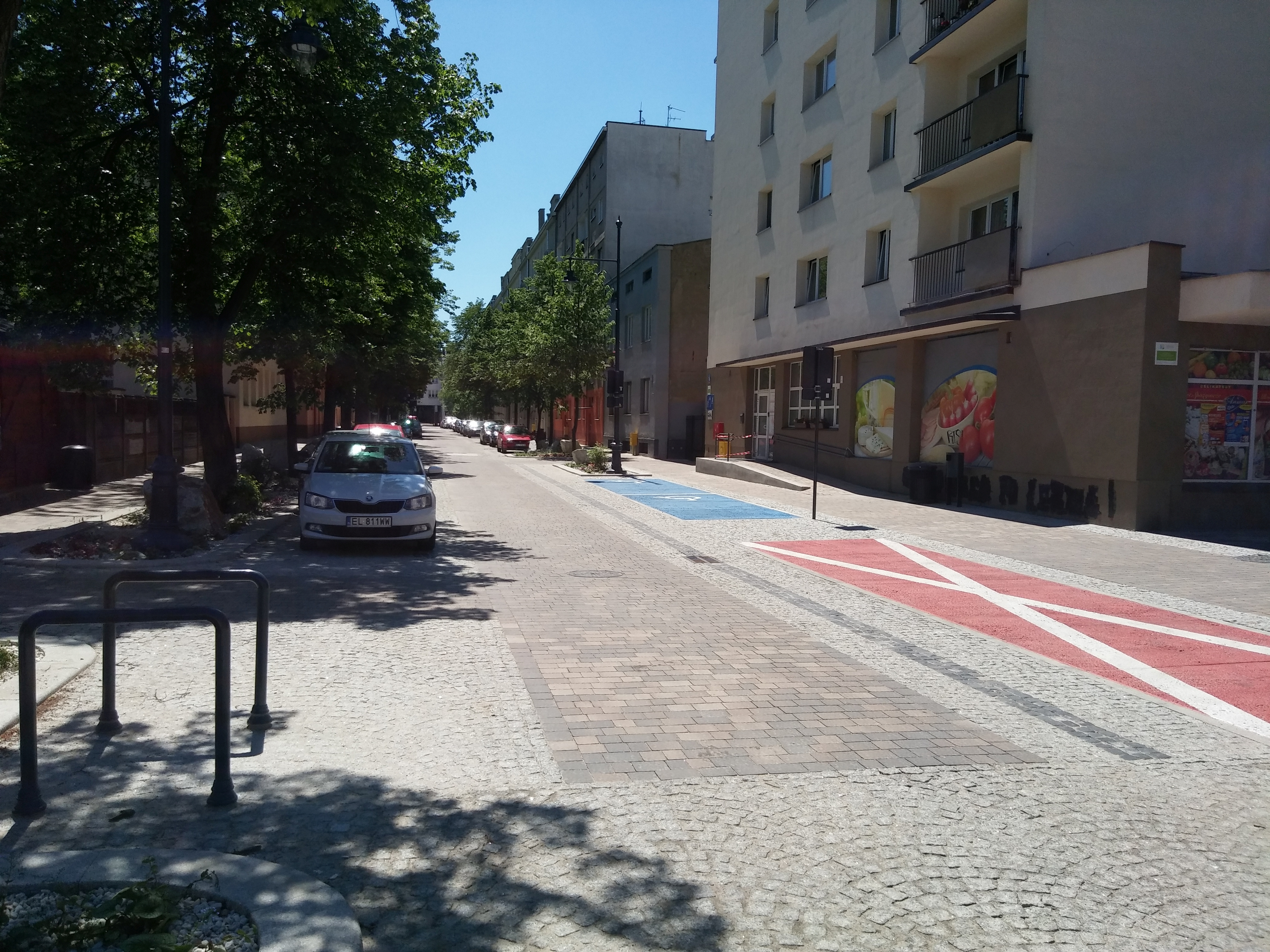
Woonerf Street

A living street or residential street is a street designed with the interests of pedestrians and cyclists in mind. Living streets also act as social spaces, allowing children to play and encouraging social interactions on a human scale, safely and legally. Living streets consider all pedestrians granting equal access to elders and those who are disabled. These roads are still available for use by motor vehicles; however, their design aims to reduce both the speed and dominance of motorized transport. The reduction of motor vehicle dominance creates more opportunities for public transportation.

Living Streets achieve these strategies by implementing the shared space approach. Reducing demarcations between vehicle traffic and pedestrians create a cohesive space without segregating different modes of transportation. Vehicle parking may also be restricted to designated bays.

These street design principles first became popularized in the Netherlands during the 1970s, and the Dutch word woonerf (lit. residential grounds) is often used as a synonym for living street.

== Overview ==
=== Current street infrastructure in the US ===
The U.S. Department of Transportation's Manual on Uniform Traffic Control Devices focuses primarily on vehicular traffic and how to optimize its movement. Streets are developed to simplify the tasks of the road and to create uniformity—uniform look and feel of the road reduces perception/reaction time, giving similar interpretations across roads and drivers. The design of the traffic control devices, which focus on the vehicle users, create a constant for when maintenance is required. Conversely, the concept of a living street focuses on creating healthier, more walkable, and more livable places while optimizing environmental benefits. Living streets aim to prioritize the safety of all street users, especially more vulnerable groups such as pedestrians and cyclists, by improving infrastructure to accommodate all street users. The living street puts a higher priority on the pedestrians rather than the vehicle traffic.

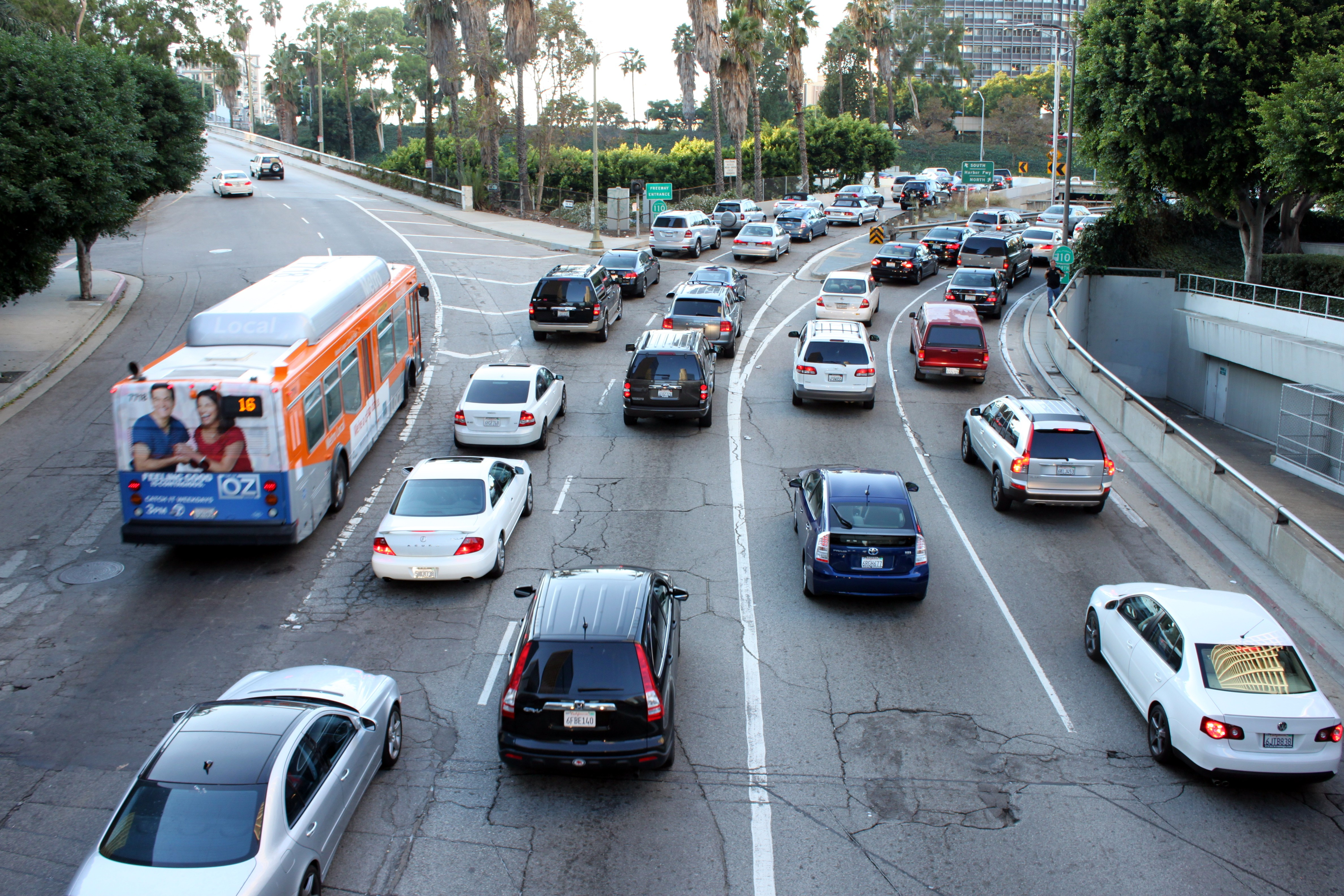
Daily traffic congestion in LA

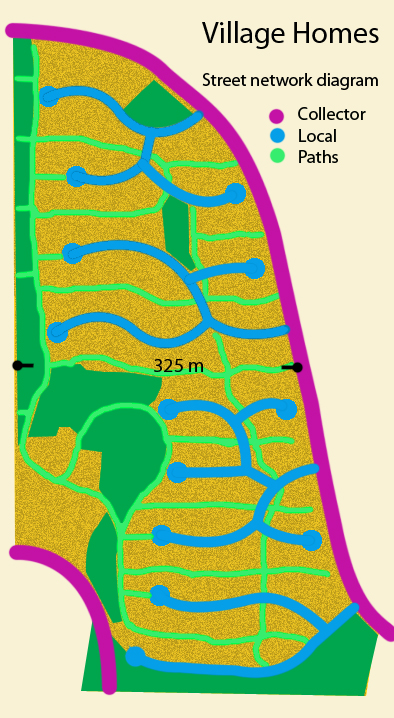
Cul de sac development

Urban Design Professor Donald Appleyard's Street Livability Study in the 1970s suggested streets in the United States were often noisy, polluted, and dangerous, and residents and cities both do not feel in control of creating clean and safe street environments. Livable streets aim to create cleaner and safer environments by creating spaces where cars are guests to pedestrians and cyclists, and by greening streets: implementing plants and greenery within the context of urban design to facilitate a more hospitable environment. Greening consists of improving the natural and built environment through reviving and developing community parks, gardens, and street trees. Establishing living streets is one way that communities can grow their urban infrastructure; further developing these urban strategies can ensure that the environmental assets deliver their full potential. This concept prioritizes the city environment, pedestrians, and community accessibility, as opposed to prioritizing movement of vehicular traffic and vehicular accessibility over other considerations. The Dutch woonerf is an example of this concept: it eliminates exclusive spaces for pedestrians and vehicular traffic, instead encouraging the whole street to be accessible to pedestrians and providing traffic calming measures for vehicles. The living environment predominates the built environment on the street; the brick streets and integrated greenery produces a nonlinear path. In their paper Reclaiming the Residential Street as a Play Place, Trantle and Doyle suggest that woonerfs increase traffic safety and children are more likely to play near or in the street. The woonerf street give equal opportunity for pedestrians, bicyclists, and vehicles but pedestrians have a priority over the vehicles. This urban living street has demonstrated that it is successful in the Netherlands.

=== Purpose of the living street ===
The living street reimagines the role of the street by reconsidering its purpose and who it is intended to serve. The street may be cooler, safer, and more walkable when implemented. Living streets produce more attractive spaces that promote the user's health and well-being. Spaces create social cohesion within a neighborhood and increase the sense of community while reinforcing cultural identity. Living streets can serve as a recreational space for the neighborhood and improve the air quality through reduced carbon emissions and other air pollutants, as well as improve water quantity and quality. Living streets can also prevent erosion and flooding through green infrastructure, stormwater management, and reuse. Living streets combine three significant components: being green, cool and complete.

=== Street concepts ===
==== Green streets ====
Green street design involves implementing stormwater management strategies to protect nearby water sources from pollutants, and encouraging water reuse. Green streets help alleviate water security issues. Drainage systems within a city are designed to provide an outlet for the runoff coming from impervious surfaces. Managing water at the source reduces the pollutants carried into local water supplies. Pollutants can be harmful to local ecosystems and water quality. Introducing green infrastructure into urban developments can make up for the lost opportunities for groundwater to infiltrate the natural environment. Green infrastructure includes permeable pavements, these porous surfaces allow runoff to infiltrate the surface. Bioretention cells or bioswales are areas that contain vegetation that is planted in engineered soil. The soil allows for the filtration and storage of stormwater, recharging groundwater supplies. Producing tree canopies is another aspect of green street design. Street trees with adequate draining allow the rainwater runoff to penetrate the soil and slow stormwater runoff. Street trees also reduce the effects of the urban heat island (see "Cool streets" below) by shading paved surfaces from heat, the environment remains cool. They also use evaporative cooling and can sequester carbon, improving air quality and reducing carbon emissions. Implementing green streets helps to reduce stormwater runoff while increasing the water quality and supply to the urban environment. Creating more resilience to climate change with a healthier community.

==== Cool streets ====
Cool streets aim to reduce the effects of the urban heat island (UHI). Traditional streets are made of dark impervious materials that absorb energy from the sun and create warmer surrounding temperatures, increasing emissions and stormwater temperatures. These surfaces create a demand for air conditioning to cool structures. Increased conditioning contributes to higher electricity needs, escalating the overall demand within a city. Hotter conditions drive the peak energy up during hot summer days, as conditioning, lights, and appliances contribute to the energy need. Overloading systems and energy grids can lead to blackouts. Power companies can implement controlled brownouts or blackouts during this time to reduce the overall outage time. Hotter conditions can harm human health, causing general discomfort, respiratory difficulties, heat cramps, exhaustion, and non-fatal heat stroke. Implementing green infrastructure and replacing dark impervious materials is a solution to cool the surrounding environment and stormwater runoff. Implementing green infrastructure such as rain gardens, planter boxes, and green parking can reduce the effects of the urban heat island. Reducing dark impervious surfaces with lighter-colored materials reduces air temperature as the street surface reflects solar energy. Cool streets assist in creating cooler communities for residents within them. Through reducing energy usage, increasing water quality, and decreasing emissions. Consequently, lower temperatures reduce both emissions and temperature. This means communities may have fewer temperature-related illnesses, and the temperature of stormwater runoff reduces its impact on aquatic life in receiving waters. These lighter surfaces are also more resistant to heat degradation, and their reflective properties allow for more visibility at night. An increase in reflectivity also contributes to the reduction of energy usage. Street lights can run a lower wattage bulb, reducing demand. Cool streets create environments with reduced air temperatures, generating more comfort.

==== Complete streets ====
Complete streets are accessible, accommodating, and safe for pedestrians and cyclists. By implementing urban development strategies, active travel, community engagement, and safe access are promoted to develop a street for all users. They are intended to provide social equity for all users. Low-income neighborhoods are most vulnerable to Incomplete streets. Incomplete streets adversely affect the surrounding communities as the conditions can be unsafe and create more significant risks for pedestrians. Incomplete streets have a higher potential for crashes or injury, and effects relating to air pollution can also influence pedestrians. incomplete streets create challenging conditions for pedestrians to walk or bicycle. Incomplete streets create car-dependent barriers and are designed only with cars in mind. Complete Streets provide drivers and other pedestrians opportunities to alter their means of transportation. The reduction of vehicular traffic increases walkability as well as bicycle safety. Complete streets provide the highest priority to walking and sustainable transportation. Complete streets assess factors such as trip duration, path gradation, and typical weather conditions are assessed to see if active travel is possible. Each design of a Complete Street includes various elements. Design strategies in complete streets include lane reductions/width reductions - decreasing the right-of-way of vehicles giving the street back to pedestrians, and creating opportunities for bicycle lanes. Raised crosswalks - a traffic calming device that brings motor traffic to the level pedestrians walk at. Curb extensions and medians increase space for street amenities such as plants, benches, and trees. Strategies implemented within complete streets improve overall health and strengthen urban ecosystems. Complete streets create environments enticing pedestrians to walk or bike. The spaces created in a complete street also encourage social interactions and productive areas. Cities are actively designing streets to prioritize pedestrian traffic efficiently and safely, create streets that reduce air pollution, and absorb storm runoff. (40) Developing complete streets also considers future technology. Future development of autonomous vehicles will reduce parking demand.

== History ==
=== Progress in the United States ===
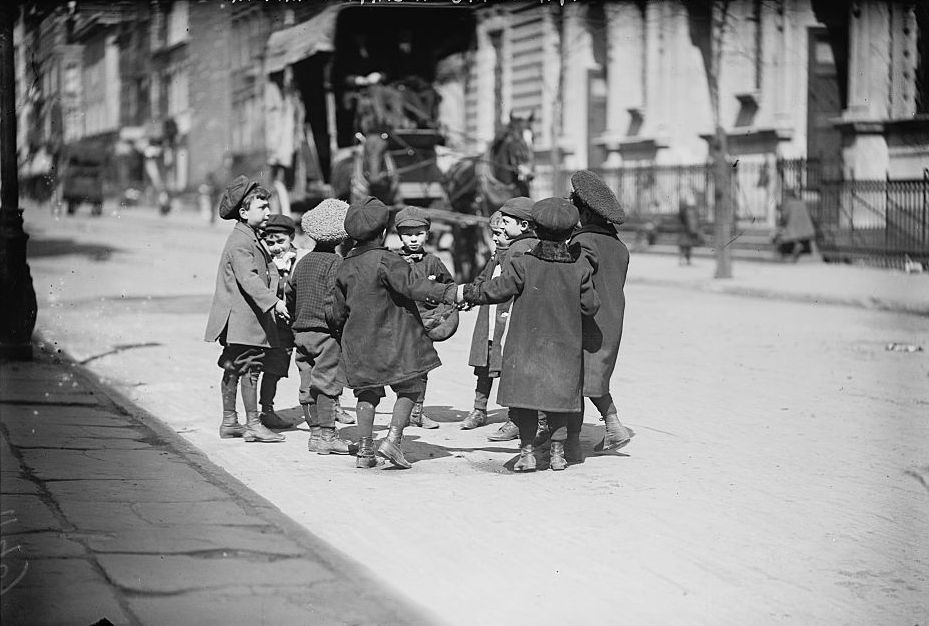
Young boys playing in a New York City street, 1909

Since the late 19th century American planners have faced problems concerning traffic congestion and street safety. The two typical designs of American neighborhoods were the gridiron plan and curvilinear street, but safety concerns regarding motor vehicles brought new street patterns in the 1920s, one being the "neighborhood unit." The Radburn plan developed by Henry Wright and Clarence Stein in the late 1920s as well as Clarence Perry's proposal in 1933 used the "neighborhood unit" to try to encourage prevention of traffic on residential streets.

In the 1930s and 1940s, increased highway traffic provoked the publication of the Community Builders Handbook. Written by the Federal Housing Administration, the handbook provided a hierarchy of street types such as arterial, collector and minor access. However, unsafe conditions were still being observed, and street types were not meeting their intent. Following this, cul de sacs and diverters were used in places such as Montclair and Grand Rapids to encourage streets to fulfill their assigned street type. In the 1950s and 1960s, extensive urban development projects concerning housing and highway construction brought increased volumes of traffic and improvements focused on the flow of the motorized vehicle. Colin Buchanan's Traffic in Towns published in 1963 in England introduced his American companions to the concept of "environmental areas", places where pedestrians are safe from motorized vehicles. He acknowledged that there was an environmental capacity to every street, and pedestrian safety, air and noise pollution, and lighting were all of particular concern. This report influenced design in countries such as Sweden and Australia as well as San Francisco's Urban Design Plan.

At the national level, the Federal Highway Administration sponsored a study conducted by Donald Appleyard in the 1970s looking at the impacts of traffic on residential streets. From the study (which looked at 500 homes in the San Francisco area in comparison to other international street designs) they found that residents were deterred by the unsafe travel speeds of motorized vehicles. This was a particular concern in areas with child and elderly populations. Noise and pollution decreased the overall livability of the streets, while more social interaction and perceived privacy was found on streets with lower traffic volumes. Stress, occupancy turnover, and adapting to unsafe living conditions were also results of unfavorable traffic conditions. The findings of Appleyard's Street Livability Study inspired the San Francisco City Planning Board to launch the San Francisco Urban Design Plan in 1971 which introduced the idea of the "protected residential area." The goal of the design was to slow down traffic to acceptable speeds in residential areas through infrastructure improvements for active transport as well as traffic calming measures. While the city's focus in street design used to be increasing the flow of motor traffic, this new approach discouraged high travel speeds. Following this plan, San Francisco developed the Protected Residential Area Program (PRA) which allowed neighborhoods to petition for traffic management measures. This encouraged community participation as well as equity and safety for all residents.

=== Influence from other countries ===
Dutch, Danish, and German cities have incorporated several design concepts and policies surrounding traffic management. They have seen improvements in overall street safety and for the more vulnerable modes of transport such as walking and cycling. The focus on active transport in countries like the Netherlands may be attributed to the more car restrictive policies they have had in place since the 1970s. The woonerf, home zone and Spielstraße require motorists to drive at walking speeds and yield to pedestrians, cyclists, and playing children who have the same rights in road use.

These cities have implemented traffic calming measures, have dedicated auto-free zones for pedestrians and cyclists, enforce lower travel speeds, and have limited and more expensive parking compared to the United States. They have no turn on red, a concept the United States has had since the 1970s which has led to a drastic increase in pedestrian and cyclist injuries. Street design in the United States tends to focus more on travel speed of motorized vehicles. In these European countries, the mindset is that motorists should anticipate the actions of pedestrians and cyclists. Their traffic calming measures have had a significant impact on traffic crashes: Dutch neighborhoods have seen traffic crashes reduced by up to 70% in some areas, whereas a study looking at Denmark, the United Kingdom and the Netherlands found that traffic-related injuries in traffic calming neighborhoods fell by about 53%.

These studies and ideas have changed some of the mindsets and ideas of street planning and design in the United States. Some planners and designs in the United States now see the street as a place to live, gather, and play instead of a means to get from one place to another. They have started to address how to make streets clean and safe for everyone, and a place where the community can gather and socialize.

Some cities in the US such as Portland and Minneapolis have increased cycling rates over five-fold from 1990 to 2008 through the implementation of the same practices used in Europe, such as improved cycling infrastructure, public education on traffic safety, integration with public transportation, increased bike sharing, and traffic calming measures. These cities have found that even though the United States has a history and culture associated with using motorized vehicles as a means of commuting, policies and infrastructure can influence people's actions and habits.

=== Post-COVID city ===
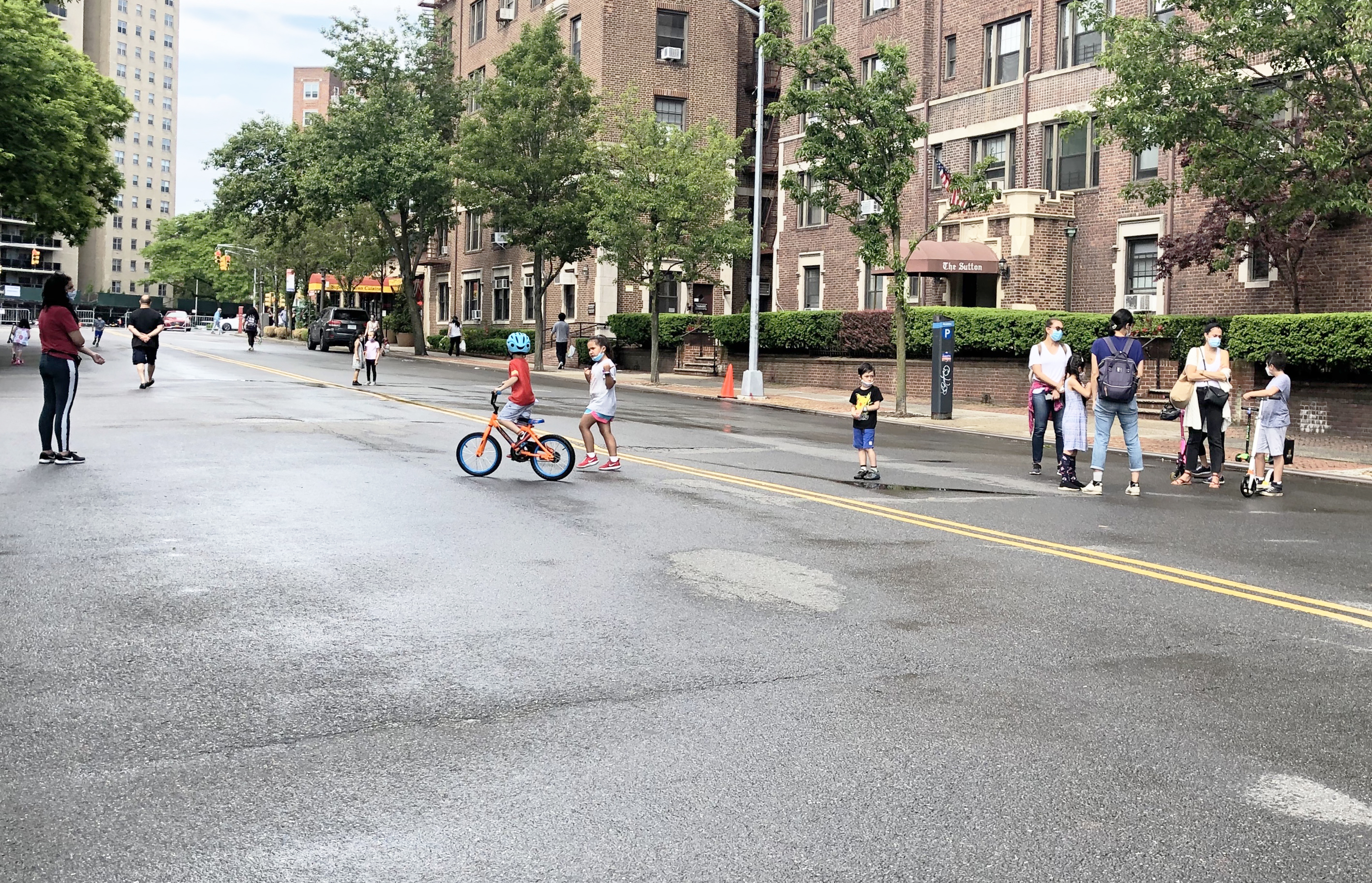
A car-free play street in New York during the COVID-19 pandemic, May 2020

The COVID-19 pandemic sparked proposals for radical change in the organization of cities. Barcelona was one city that proposed a radical change. The Manifesto for the Reorganisation of the city after COVID-19 was published during the pandemic, in April 2020. One hundred sixty academics and three hundred architects signed the manifesto, written by architecture and urban theorist Massimo Paolini. The manifesto proposed pedestrianization of the whole city, prioritizing bicycle transport and efficient public transportation. The concept of a living street was a vital part of the manifesto. Reduction of vehicle traffic during the pandemic positively impacted the environment as air and noise pollution significantly decreased. Residents put emphasis on the idea of a living street as it would introduce more nature into the city. Living streets in Barcelona create opportunities for children to have a safe environment to play. COVID-19 increased the desire for areas dedicated to urban green spaces, as these areas became places of refuge during the pandemic. The re-naturalization of the city is now held to a higher standard as it guarantees an increase in human health and wellbeing. The manifesto inspired other Spanish cities to publish their own version adapted to the local context: Granada, Zaragoza, Guadalajara, the Basque Country and the initiative Ciudades Sostenibles.

== Design ==
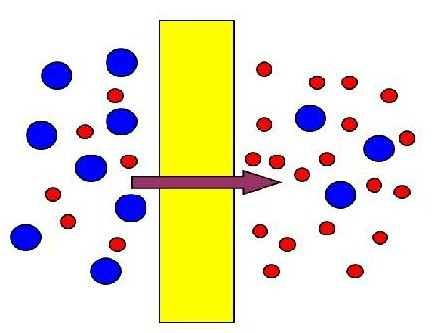
Membrane diagram resembling high traffic street

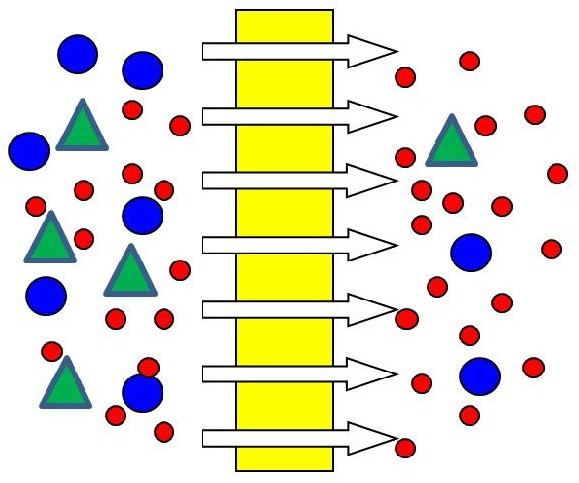
Membrane diagram resembling low traffic street

The design of the living street aims to promote safe walking and cycling, emphasizing pedestrians. Living Streets are achieved by restricting car use and parking, diminishing convenience to motor vehicles. Decreasing vehicular traffic increases the appeal for Sustainable modes of transportation. This is accomplished through better infrastructure, traffic calming, integration of walking and cycling with public transport, policies that encourage mixed-use development, regulations that are sensitive to more vulnerable populations and commuters, and community traffic education. Proponents believe a successful design cannot simply be individual measures taken but a combined, comprehensive approach that implements all these factors into a fully integrated and incorporated design.

=== Environmental design ===
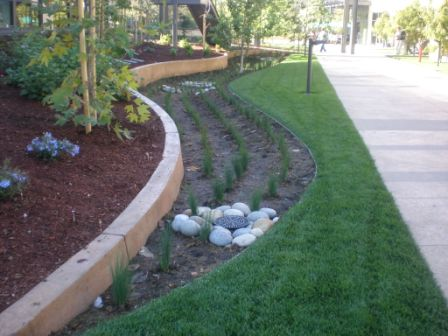
Stormwater management along a sidewalk

Environmental design elements in a living street provide strategies to mitigate stormwater runoff and reduce the urban heat island effect. Green infrastructure such as roadside plantings, rain gardens, and other strategies have a growing importance as stormwater runoff is a fast-growing source of pollution. Impervious pavements repel stormwater, decreasing the amount of water that surfaces can absorb. Stormwater runoff absorbs any pollutants present on the surface. Contaminants such as road salt, fertilizers, oil, or chemicals from cars can dirty the runoff. Storm drains that lead directly into public waterways carries these pollutants, causing harm to the nutrients and health of the public waterways. Managing stormwater through environmental design keeps the water clean and healthy from pollutants. Green infrastructure such as permeable paving and bioretention planters and swales are strategies that can reduce the effects of stormwater runoff. Permeable pavement can be used for sidewalks, bike lanes, parking lanes, and low-volume streets to allow water to infiltrate through surfaces and reduce runoff to nearby water. Pervious pavement promotes healthy runoff by increasing infiltration through the soil layers before reaching a resting state. Bioretention planters and bioswales are typically used in planting strips or curb bulb-outs to treat stormwater runoff. Swales consist of deep channels of native plants combined with engineered soil that allows them to handle large amounts of water. The deep channels increase the water captured and filter out solids and other contaminants. In addition to stormwater management, street trees, and urban canopies assist in shading surfaces and protecting them from the sun. Trees contribute to natural stormwater management by cutting off some rainwater before hitting the ground. Street trees also reduce surrounding temperatures and improve air quality. Providing shade and stormwater management can lead to a longer infrastructure life, saving replacement costs and turnover for the surfaces. Implementing environmental design strategies improves the quality of life by reducing air temperatures and pollution and improving water quality.

=== Traffic calming measures ===
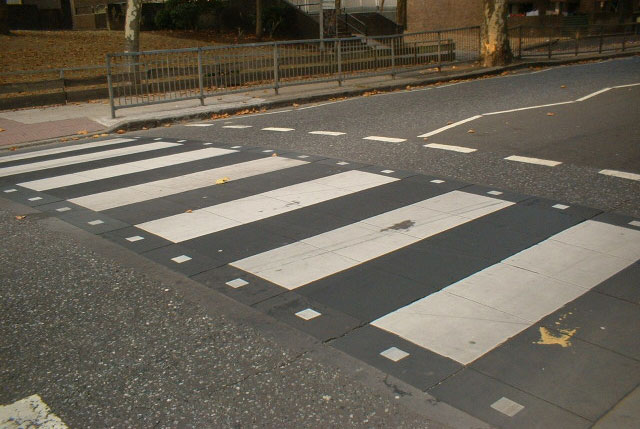
Zebra crossing

In order to reclaim streets as a play area for children and a place for the community to gather and socialize, traffic calming measures can be put in place. This may include introducing speed bumps, changing the surface of the road, or creating artificial chicanes. These measures physically enforce reasonable speeds, rather than signage which can have little effect on the driver's actions - instead, drivers are forced to be more aware of their actions and the actions of other street users. Other traffic calming measures include raised intersections and pedestrian crossings which bring the vehicles to the pedestrian level, indicating cars do not have full ownership of the road and must be vigilant of other road users. Chicanes, narrower travel lanes, and roundabouts purposefully slow down cars to safer speeds. Extensive car-free areas, wide, well-lit sidewalks, refuge islands for crossings, crossing signals, and zebra crossings provide safe and convenient facilities for more vulnerable road users. The woonerf in the Netherlands incorporates some of these traffic calming techniques but goes further in that it uses the concept of the shared street where separate spaces are not defined and pedestrians have access to the entire street. Developing the street more by filling in the "street wall" is another design measure to encourage walking and cycling. This concept consists of filling in the empty spaces and large parking lots often found adjacent to streets to make the street not only more attractive or inviting but also more accessible to these active commuters. In addition, moving parking lots to the back of the store like found in European countries gives priority to pedestrians and cyclists near the entrance.

Living streets focus on how to best move people and not just the car. The design aims resolve issues such as high-speed traffic arterials, too few intersections, and lack of sidewalks. There may be dedicated transit lanes, sidewalks and bike lanes, and spaces that serve the entire community regardless of age, income, or ability. Measures such as bike lanes and safe, accessible maintained sidewalks will provide the infrastructure for the community to become active commuters. Further design strategies such as medians can serve as a safety net for pedestrians and indicate pedestrian presence for motor vehicles, while reducing lane and land width and bulb-outs can decrease a pedestrian's crossing distance. Speed bumps and traffic circles can make the street seem like less of a highway. Instead, these measures encourage lower travel speeds and therefore bring increased safety for other street users. Adequate signage, signals, and lighting can also be used to make all users aware the street is a shared space. These measures may require even less space to carry more people.

=== Compact and mixed-use development ===
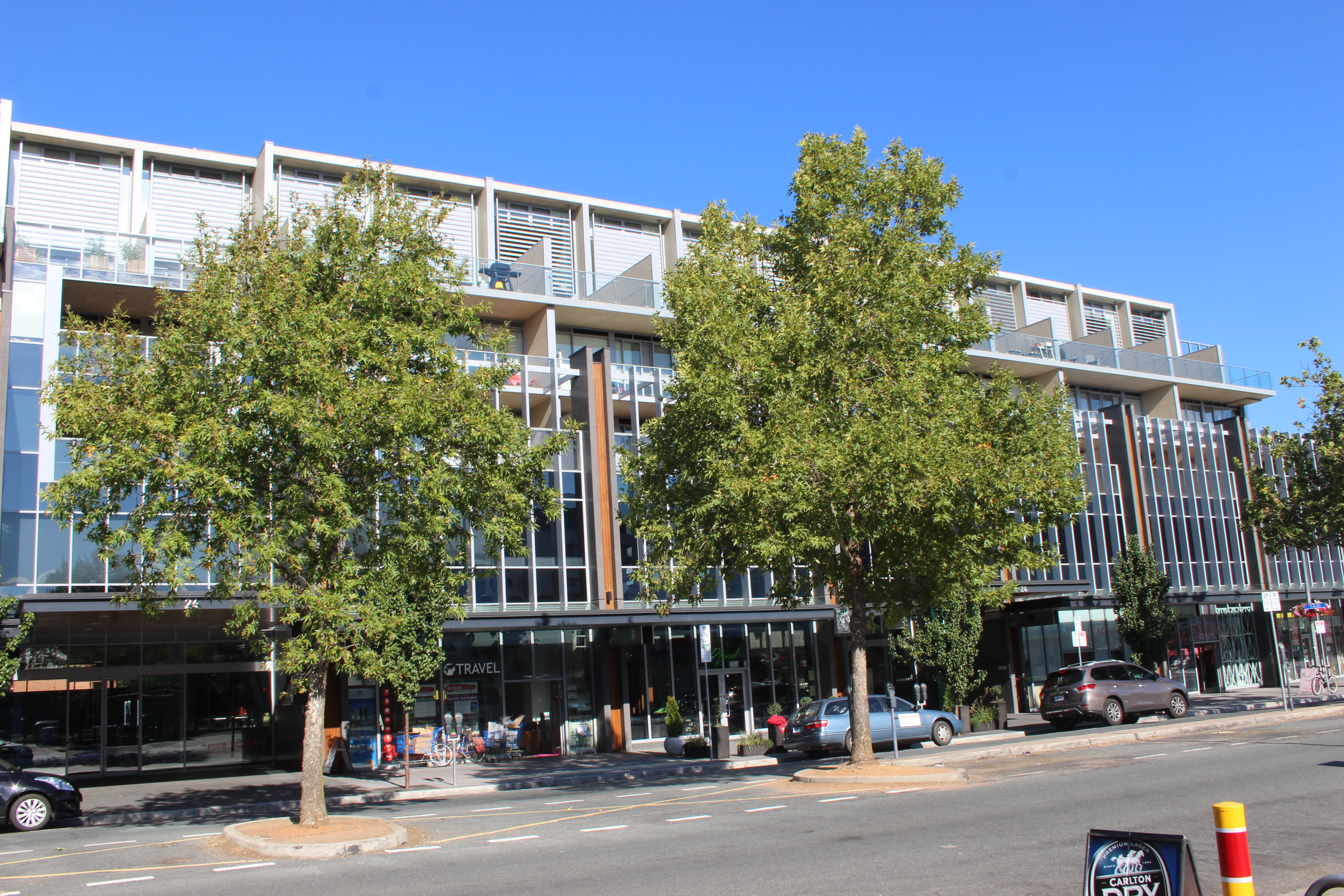
Mixed-use development in Lonsdale St., Braddon, Australia

Compact and mixed-use development is another strategy of the living street since how land is used will determine trip distances and preferred modes of transportation. Cycling is typically done at distances below 3 km and walking is typically done at distances below 1 km. If trip destinations are within walking or cycling distance, people may utilize the sidewalks and bike lanes for their commute. In addition, compact neighborhoods will also make transit a realistic option because the population will exist to provide the necessary ridership. Advocates suggest establishing strong neighborhood centers with local accessibility - instead of creating separate commercial and residential areas, which promote car use through increased trip lengths – that will lead to more sustainable and livable conditions.

== Benefits ==
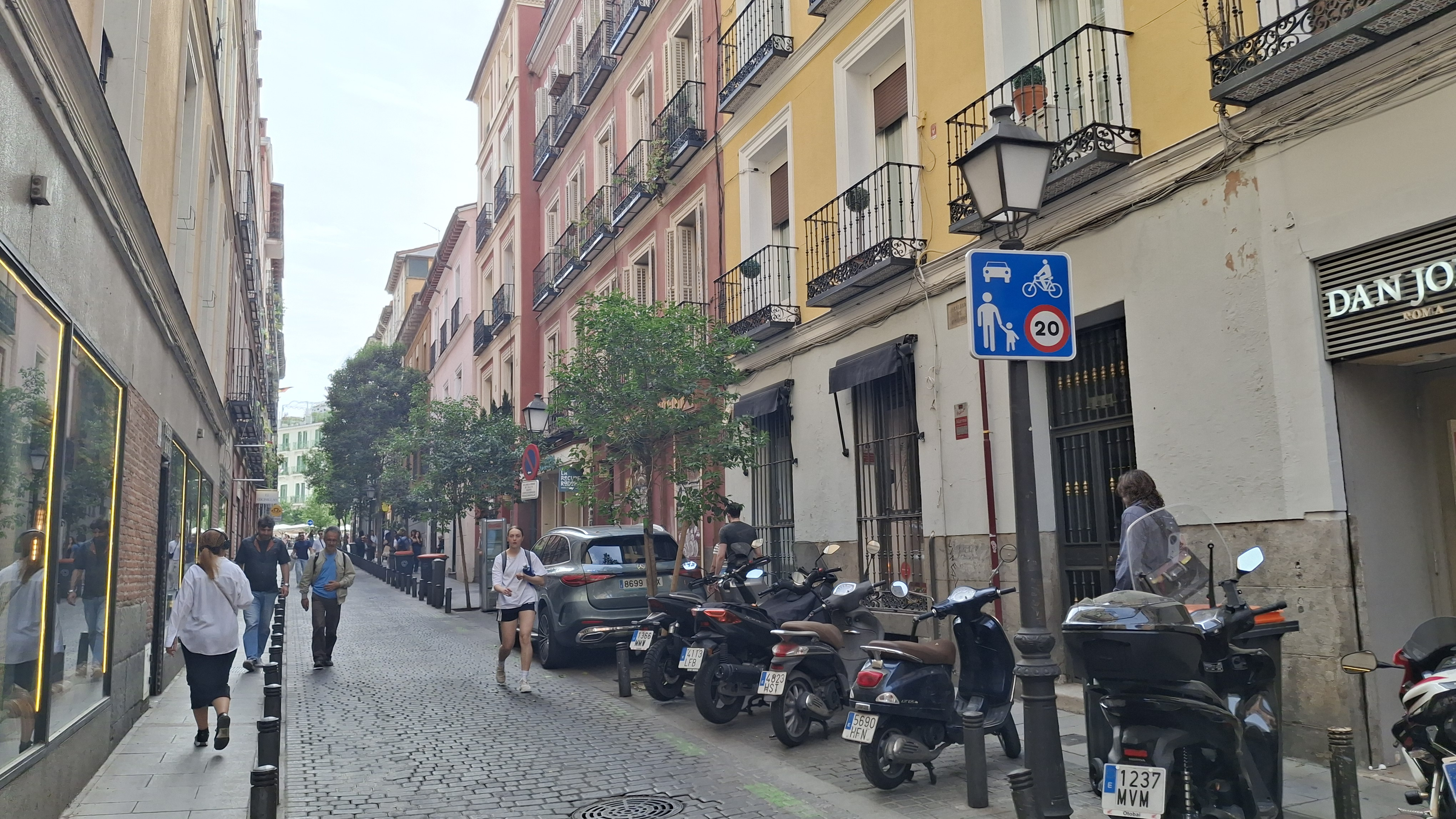
Coexistence zone in Madrid, Spain.

Living streets are sustainable from an economical, environmental, and social view. They can promote public health through the different modes of active transport offered as well as social equity through enhancing livability for all users. The design is intended to reduce traffic danger and increase safety using modes of active transport that have minimal noise and air pollution and use far fewer non-renewable resources compared to motorized transportation. By reducing the number of cars and incorporating public and active transport, living streets can move more people with the same or less amount of space than the current street since these modes take up far less space than cars, whether in use or in storage.

=== Health ===
The design of living streets makes it easier for people to satisfy the need for daily physical activity since they can walk or cycle as a part of their commute. Walking and cycling provides a form of physical activity and accounts for numerous health benefits that can combat current concerns for public health. In comparing obesity rates with walking and cycling for commuters between countries, studies show that the countries with a greater number of cyclist and pedestrian commuters tend to have lower rates of obesity. Lack of exercise can also lead to other chronic health problems like diabetes or heart disease. In addition, walking and cycling can reduce the number of cars on the street, bringing a reduction in air, water and noise pollution as well as carbon emissions. This cleaner air may also reduce asthma and other respiratory diseases in urban areas. The CLAN study conducted by Carver and Crawford in 2008 revealed that the built environment and street design can also play a role in the health and wellbeing of children.

=== Safety ===
Government injury rate statistics from Californian cities and European countries show that higher numbers of cycling and walking may increase safety. Public health consultants such as Peter Jacobsen suggest this is because there is a greater awareness of cyclist and pedestrian movements so motor vehicles are more prepared to react and avoid crashes. In addition, motorists may also be cyclists or pedestrians themselves which makes them more sensitive to the needs and rights of these more vulnerable groups. Larger groups of these active commuters may also justify more rights to the road and an increase in improving and enhancing public infrastructure geared toward them. Fewer cars can also reduce traffic congestion.

=== Social ===
Living streets give more options for how people travel or get from one place to another and balances options so it is safe for all users. In addition, revitalizing existing areas instead of continuing suburban sprawl helps utilize and build upon past investments in infrastructure. This revitalization may include improved infrastructure that encourages people to sit, walk, and gather instead of being driven away by noisy traffic polluting the air. In addition, more people out and about in the streets can help reduce crime.

The concept of living streets also works to prevent alienation children may have with their surroundings by providing them spaces to play and develop in an outdoor environment. The spaces allow children to experience different environments and communities as well as the ability to develop new relationships with others in these safer spaces. As a result, children living near these streets will be healthier individuals since they have a greater and safer exposure to the environment around them and are able to develop relationships and interact with various individuals.

=== Equity ===
Living street designs are intended to serve all users. The concept hopes to advance livability for the entire community by envisioning the street as providing multiple benefits for several types of users instead of simply a means for motorized traffic to get from one place to another. This investment in public infrastructure also seeks to provide more economical alternatives for the user since they can rely on other modes of transportation to get from place to place.

Instead of focusing solely on the movement of cars, living streets are designed to move people and focus more broadly on several different modes of transportation that can be accessible to all people. A significant deterrent to active transport is a lack of traffic safety, especially to groups of society like the elderly and children who are more vulnerable to these dangers and, with current streets, often need more protection from car traffic. Increased walking and cycling in these groups would improve their physical activity and expand their mobility and independence.

In addition, current streets may have uninviting landscapes or be unsafe to walk or bike on, meaning driving a car is often the only safe or practical option. There is no place to gather or congregate or for children to play, and it is hard for the more vulnerable groups like children and those with disabilities to travel in anything but the car. Since lower income or senior citizens may not be able to afford or operate cars and rely on other modes of transportation to move around and be independent, living streets provide more economical and independent modes of transport. In addition, implementation of street trees, foundations, and plazas can allow people to gather and enjoy the street in a shared and communal experience.

== Counterarguments ==
Opponents to the living street believe that if more people opt for active transport alternatives as opposed to utilizing motor vehicles, travel time will increase significantly and will be inconvenient for commuters. They also believe that unless people utilize the infrastructure for active transport the living street provides, other nearby non-living streets will be congested due to the hindrance the living street creates for the motor vehicle.

== Around the world ==
Country	Local name	Maximum speed (km/h)	Details	Notes
Australia	Shared Zone	10		
Australia	Bike boulevard	30	Described by the Department of Transport (Western Australia) as "an innovative program designed to make cycling safer and easier". Bike boulevards are marked with blue-and-white Safe Active Street road patches at major entry points.	
Austria	Wohnstraße ("Living street")		Similar legislation as in Germany	
Belgium	Woonerf, erf (Dutch); Zone résidentielle, zone de rencontre (French)	20	Usually same grade, parking is only allowed in marked places.	
Canada	Woonerf			Woonerfs are planned for Toronto, where they have been approved for the West Don Lands community and are being discussed for Queens Quay along the waterfront, Honest Ed's redevelopment in Mirvish Village and for Montreal, where one will replace an alley covering the former course of the St-Pierre river in Saint-Henri.
Colombia	Calle cívica or calle de encuentro ("Civic street" or "encounter street")	10–20	Pedestrians, children and cyclists are encouraged to use the complete space.	
Czech Republic	Obytná zóna ("Residential zone")	20	Usually same grade, parking is only allowed in marked places.	In Czech law since 2001
Croatia	Zona smirenog prometa ("Traffic calm zone")	10		
Finland	Pihakatu ("Yard street")	20	Pedestrians have absolute right of way. Parking is only allowed for bicycles and mopeds or in marked places.	The first living street was introduced in 1982 in Forssa.
France	Zone de rencontre ("Encounter zone")	20	Usually same grade, parking restrictions not specified	The first living street was introduced in 2008.
Germany	Verkehrsberuhigter Bereich ("Traffic calming area")	6	Vehicles should not travel faster than a pedestrian speed. If not same grade then street usable by pedestrians. Parking is only allowed in marked places. Pedestrians, including children, may use the entire street and children are permitted to play in the street In everyday language, a Verkehrsberuhigter Bereich is also (falsely) called a Spielstraße ("play street").	Under German traffic law motorists in a Verkehrsberuhigter Bereich are restricted to a maximum speed of 7 km/h. First trials occurred in 1977, incorporated into traffic laws in 1980.
Iceland	Vistgata	15	Vehicles should not travel faster than 15 km/h and must yield to pedestrians, cyclists and children at play. If a pedestrian is near, the allowed top speed is walking speed. Pedestrians are however not permitted to un-necessarily hinder the travel of the vehicle. Both beginning and end of living streets are marked.	Introduced into law in 1985
Italy	Zona residenziale	30	Vehicles should not travel faster than 30 km/h without interfering with pedestrians or cyclists. Both beginnings and endings of living streets are marked.	Introduced by the legislation on traffic in 1995. Actually it is seldom fully implemented like in the original Dutch model; very often a "Zona 30" is only indicated by a street sign and the speed limit.
Ireland	Crios Mall; Slow Zone	30	A self-contained grouping of houses with single or multiple entry points for vehicles. Such areas often have green areas or play areas within them. The needs of vulnerable road users are merely "deemed to take precedence over those of motorists".	A "slow zone" differs from a "shared space"; as such, no shared space attributes are necessarily put in place, unlike other countries. Instead, other traffic calming measures are installed, such as speed bumps.
Mexico	Vía de tránsito mixto ("Mixed transit road")	10–20	Installed only if the street has limited parking areas, is paved with some speed-limiting material or possesses some kind of traffic-calming measures and is designed with a single grade to favor intermingled use.	
Netherlands	Woonerf	15	Usually same grade	
New Zealand	Shared Zone		Similar to Australia	
Norway	Gatetun ("Street yard")	15		
Poland	Strefa zamieszkania ("Residential zone")	20	Pedestrians (including playing children, even without parental supervision) can use entire street and have absolute precedence over vehicles. Parking is only allowed in marked places. Speed calming devices do not have to be marked using road signs. The sign that marks an end of a living street also obligates a driver to give way to other participants in road traffic	
Russia	Жилая зона ("Living zone")	20	No through traffic or parking with engine running.	
Serbia	Zona usporenog saobraćaja ("Decelerated-traffic zone")	10	Vehicles should not travel faster than a pedestrian speed and without interfering with pedestrians or cyclists. Both beginnings and endings of living streets are marked.	Introduced by the legislation change in 2009, with first living streets introduced in September 2010.
Slovakia	Obytná zóna ("Residential street")	20	Usually same grade, parking is only allowed in marked places.	
Spain	Zona de estancia y juego ("Living and play area")	10	Traffic zones that are primarily intended for pedestrians and where the following special traffic rules apply: the maximum speed for vehicles is set at 10 kilometers per hour and drivers must give priority to pedestrians; vehicles may only be parked in places designated by signs or markings; bicycles and, where applicable, personal mobility vehicles (PMVs), may travel in both directions, unless otherwise determined by the competent authority; pedestrians may use the entire traffic zone and therefore pedestrian crossings are not marked; games and sports are permitted. It will always be accompanied by a speed limit sign (R-301), which limits the speed to 10 km/h.	Before 2025 legislation changes, the term calle residencial ("residential street") was used.
Spain	Zona de coexistencia ("Coexistence zone")	20	Traffic zone primarily intended for pedestrians, where the following special traffic rules apply: the maximum vehicle speed is 20 km/h; traffic is shared by vehicles, cyclists, and pedestrians; pedestrians have priority, may use the entire traffic zone, and therefore pedestrian crossings are not marked; bicycles and, where applicable, personal mobility vehicles (PMVs) may travel in both directions, unless otherwise stipulated by the competent authority; vehicles may only be parked in designated areas marked by signs or signs; games and sports are not permitted.	Introduced by a legislation change in 2025.
Sweden	Gångfartsområde ("Walking speed area")	7	Applies to both motorized vehicles and bikes. Pedestrians have absolute right of way. No parking, except in marked places.	
Switzerland	Zone de rencontre (French: "Encounter zone"), Begegnungszone (German: "Encounter zone")	20	Usually same grade. Parking is only allowed in marked places.	Introduced by the legislation change in September 2001. Link: Zones de rencontre
Turkey	Yaya öncelikli yol ("Pedestrian priority road")	20	Pedestrians (including playing children, even without parental supervision) can use entire street and have full right of way, however, the pedestrian shall not prevent a vehicle passing through. No parking except in marked places. Both beginnings and endings of living streets are marked.	
United Kingdom	Home zone, Living street			Link: Signing

== Signage ==
Austria

Belgium

Colombia

Croatia

Czechia

Denmark

Estonia

Finland

France

Germany

Hungary

Ireland

Mexico

Netherlands

Poland

Russia

Serbia

Slovakia

Spain

Sweden

Switzerland

== See also ==
- Automotive city – Urban planning prioritising automobiles
- Bicycle-friendly – Urban planning prioritising cycling
- Carfree city – Urban area absent of motor vehicles
- Naked street – Road designed without traditional signs
- School street – Pedestrian street in front of a school
- List of car-free places
- Pedestrian zone – Urban car-free area reserved for pedestrian use
- Pedestrian village – Urban planning for mixed-use areas prioritising pedestrians
- Third place
- Traffic conflict
- Transport divide – Unequal access to transport
- Urban vitality
- World Urbanism Day
