= Shared Zone =

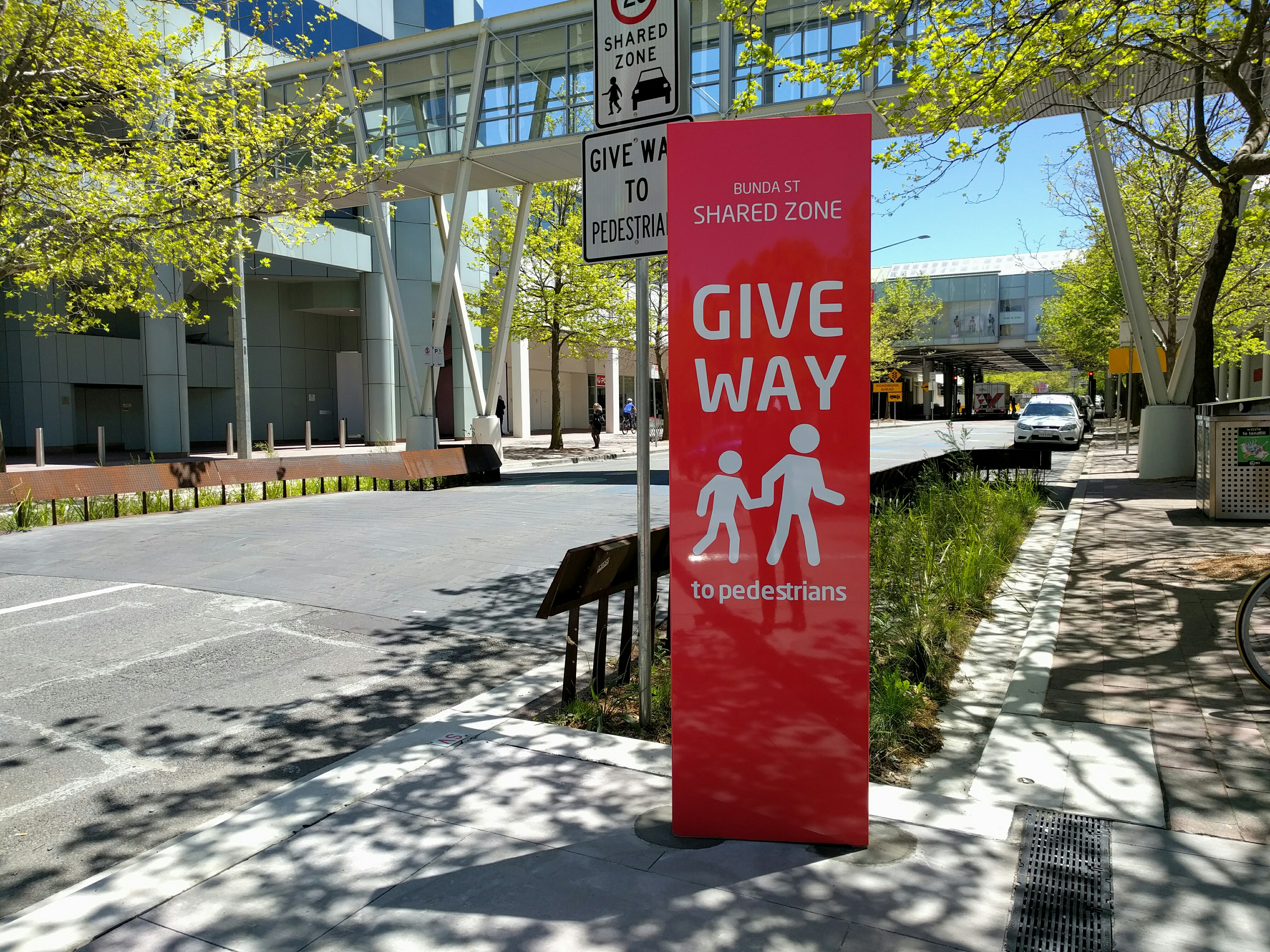
A group of signs marking the start of the Bunda Street shared zone in Canberra

A shared zone is an implementation of a living street in Australia and New Zealand, where pedestrians, cyclists and motorised traffic share the same road space. Special rules and speed limits apply for shared zones. Shared zones are related, but not automatically the same as shared space, which is a somewhat wider concept including elements such as urban design.

== Rules ==
=== For motorists and cyclists ===
- Motorists and cyclists must give way (yield) to pedestrians at all times throughout the entire zone, regardless of traffic signals, pedestrian crossing signals or other considerations.
- The typical speed limit of shared zones is 10 km/h (6.2 mph).

=== For pedestrians ===
- Pedestrians have right-of-way over motorists and cyclists at all times, and normal crossing rules do not apply.

== Traffic signs ==
Start Shared Zone Sign (R4-4)

End Shared Zone Sign (R4-5)

The sign "Start Shared Zone" (R4-4) indicates that the shared zone rules apply past this point.

The sign "End Shared Zone" (R4-5) indicates the end of the shared zone.

== See also ==
- Speed limits in Australia
