= Woonerf =

Type of living street design

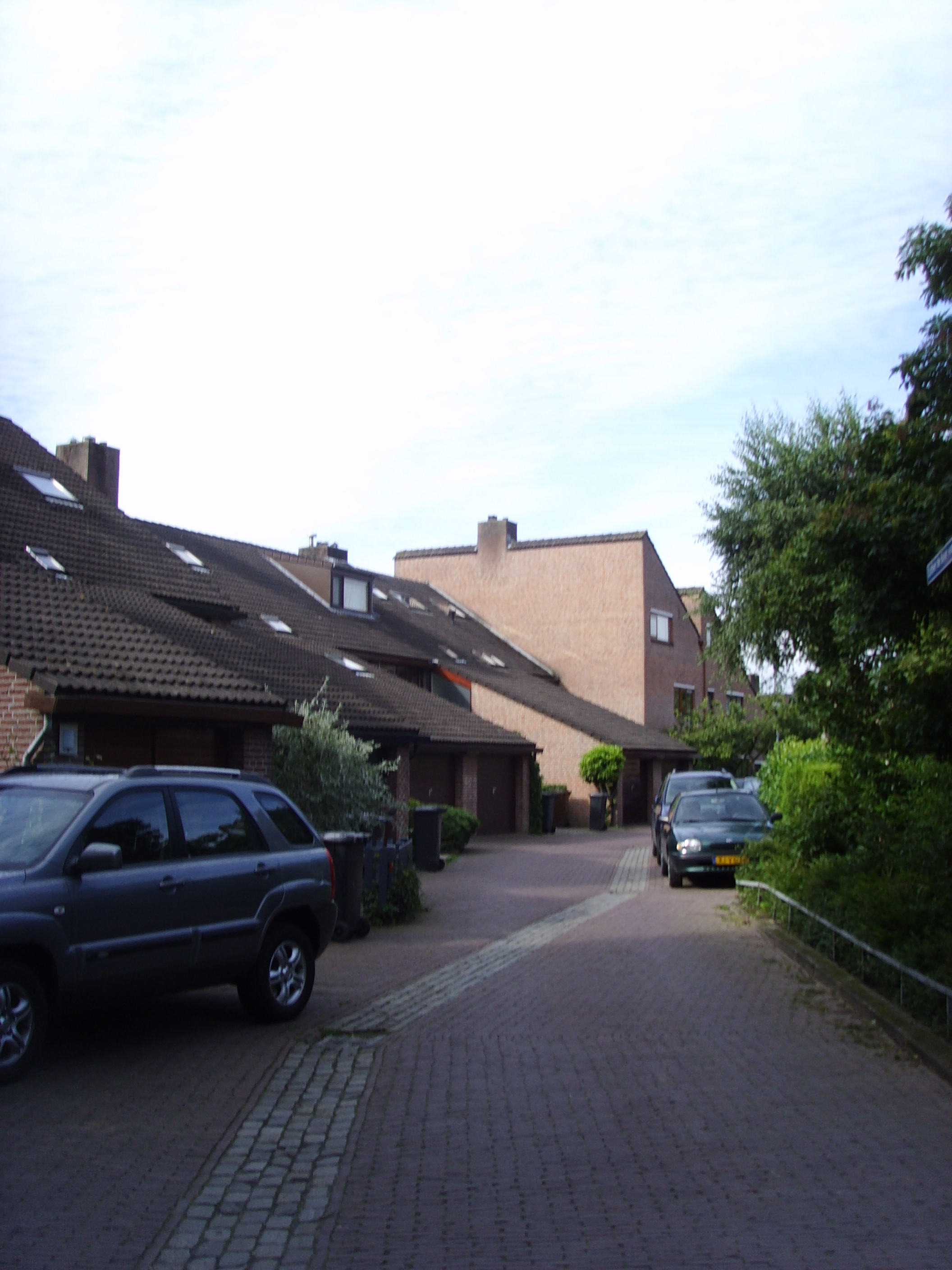
A purpose designed woonerf in east Utrecht

A woonerf (Dutch pronunciation: [ˈʋoːnɛr(ə)f]) is a living street, as originally implemented in the Netherlands and subsequently in Flanders (Belgium). Techniques include shared space, traffic calming, and low speed limits.

The term woonerf has been adopted directly by some English-language publications. In the United Kingdom, these areas are called home zones.

== Etymology ==
The word, of Dutch origin, literally translates as 'living yard' or 'residential grounds'.

== History ==
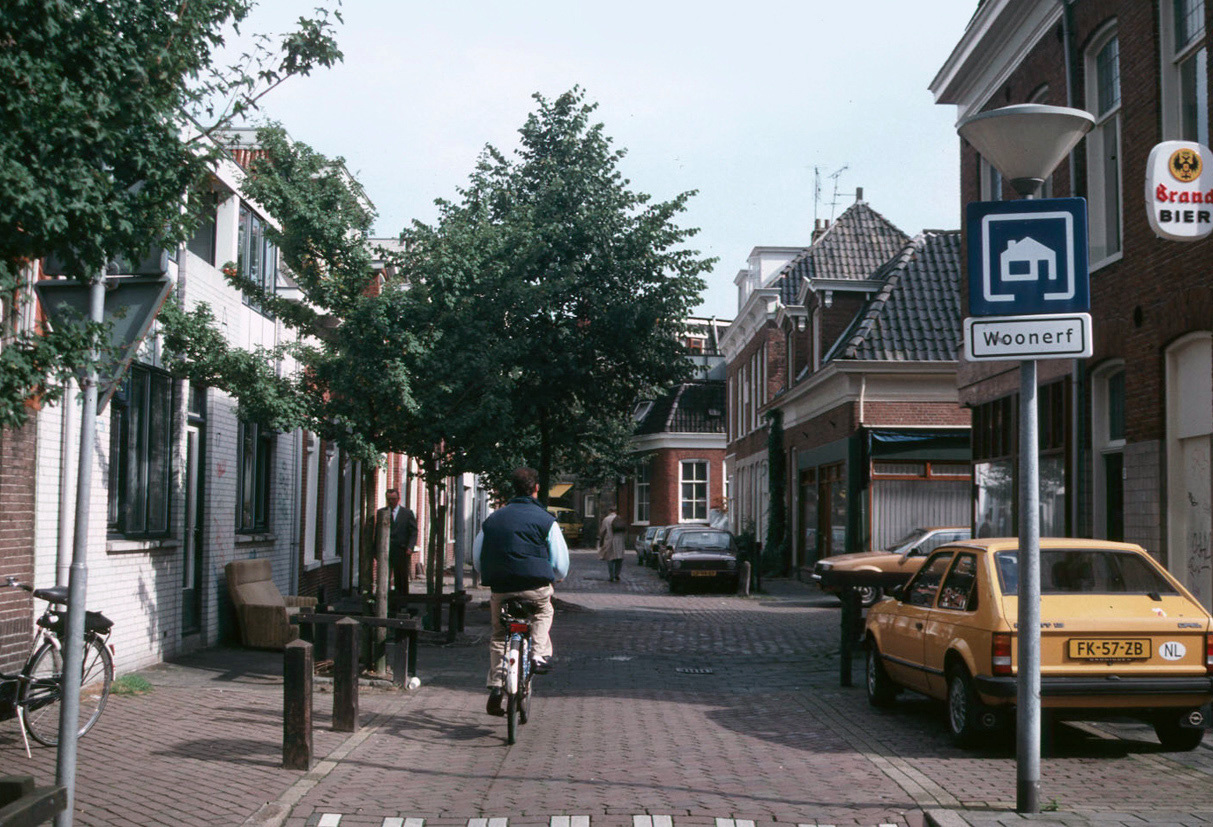
An old Dutch street turned into a woonerf

Since the invention of automobiles, cities have been predominantly constructed to accommodate the use of automobiles.

The woonerf was created by residents of Delft who tore up pavement late at night to make it so cars had to drive slower to avoid the obstacles. The woonerven (plural) was incorporated into the national street design standards in 1976.

The entire locality of Emmen in the Netherlands was designed as a woonerf in the 1970s.

In 1999 the Netherlands had over 6000 woonerven and as of 2011, around 2 million Dutch people live on woonerven. The benefits of the woonerf are promoted by woonERFgoed, a network of professionals and residents.

In 2006 it was reported that people in Hesselterbrink, a neighborhood of Emmen, were disillusioned about how the woonerf principle had become another traffic engineering measure that "entailed precious little more than signs and uniform standards". They have now adopted the shared space principles as a way of rethinking the woonerf. They are reported to "now know that car drivers should become residents. Eye contact and human interaction are more effective means to achieve and maintain attractive and safe areas than signs and rules".

== Regulation ==
=== Belgium ===
Traffic sign indicating the start of a woonerf (and of the more generic erf)

Belgian traffic regulation (art. 2.32) defines the woonerf and the generic erf, and their traffic sign. The woonerf has a residential focus; the erf can have other primary uses like “crafts, trade, tourism, education and recreation”.

In art. 22bis, the Belgian traffic regulation describes what is and what is not allowed in a (woon)erf:

Within erven and woonerven:

1. Pedestrians can use the full width of the public road; and playing is also allowed.
2. Drivers may not endanger pedestrians or hinder them; if necessary they must stop. Furthermore they need to be twice as careful regarding children. Pedestrians may not obstruct traffic unnecessarily.
3. Speed is limited to 20 km per hour.
4. Parking is forbidden, except where there are visual markings like different surface colors, a letter P or traffic signs allowing parking.

=== Netherlands ===
Under Article 44 of the Dutch traffic code, motorised traffic in a woonerf or "recreation area" is restricted to 15 km/h in the Netherlands.
