= Home zone =

Type of street

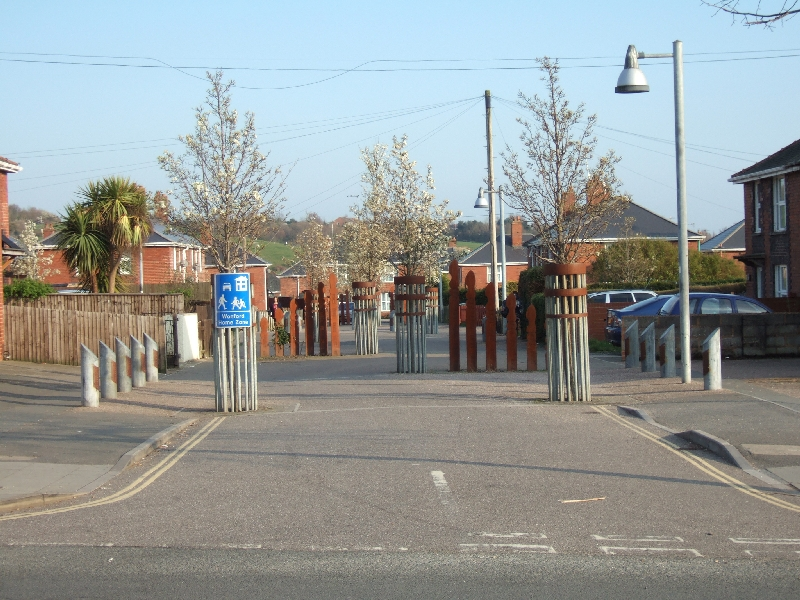
Entrance to a home zone in Wonford

A home zone (or play street) is a living street (or group of streets) as implemented in the United Kingdom, which are designed primarily to meet the needs of pedestrians, cyclists, children and residents and where the speeds and dominance of cars is reduced. Quiet lanes are a similar concept in rural areas.

== History ==
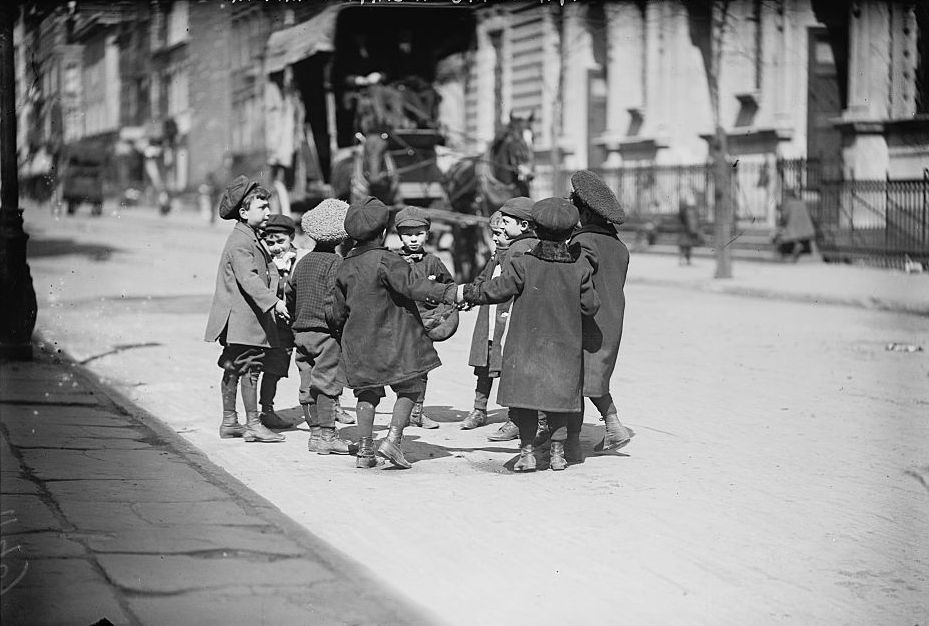
Young boys playing in a New York City street, 1909

The Highway Act 1835 banned the playing of football and street games on the highway with a maximum penalty of forty shillings (£159.05 as of 2015). In 1860 Taverner John Miller, MP for Colchester reported to the House of Commons that in the previous year 44 children had been sent to prison in London and Middlesex for failure to pay fines for playing in the street, highlighting the case of a 12-year-old boy sent to prison for 5 days for playing rounders. In 1925 Nancy Astor MP noted in the Commons that "There is no more pitiable sight in life than a child which has been arrested for playing in the street". By 1935 over 2,000 young people under the age of seventeen were prosecuted for playing in the streets.

In 1934 Leslie Hore-Belisha became Transport Minister and initiated a number of road safety schemes in response the rising number of Road Casualties in Great Britain; these included the zebra crossing and a proposal to introduce play streets to the UK, which had been successfully operating in the USA. Following a trial of 200 Play Streets in Manchester and Salford from 1936, the Street Playground Act 1938 allowed councils to designate streets as playgrounds where games could be played.

In 1957 the Transport Minister was asked in the Commons if he was aware that playground streets regulations were being ignored and were frequently used by through traffic; the Minister responded saying that the size of Playground Streets signs had recently been increased in size to make them more prominent. Play street legislation was included in section 49 of the Road Traffic Act 1960.

By 1963 there were 750 such streets around the country, but there was also growing conflict between the needs of children and the desires of motorists. In that year Ernest Marples, the Transport minister, was asked in the Commons if he could make a statement about the issue of car parking in play streets; he responded by indicating that he had only occasionally received complaints about parking issues in play streets. In the same year a petition was presented in the Commons from residents objecting to the illegal use of their playground street in Westminster being used by through-traffic and by people parking cars By contrast, the minister was also questioned in the Commons about a recently approved Playgrounds Street Order for a number of streets in Newcastle which was reported to have been opposed by all residents. In 1976 Trevor Huddleston, the Bishop of Stepney commented that Britain appeared to prefer motor cars to children 'by cluttering up Play Streets with parked cars'. By the 1980s Playgrounds Streets had been largely forgotten; there were streets which retained the signage and accompanying traffic restrictions, however residents' parked cars left no space for play.

== Current legislation ==
=== Home Zone ===
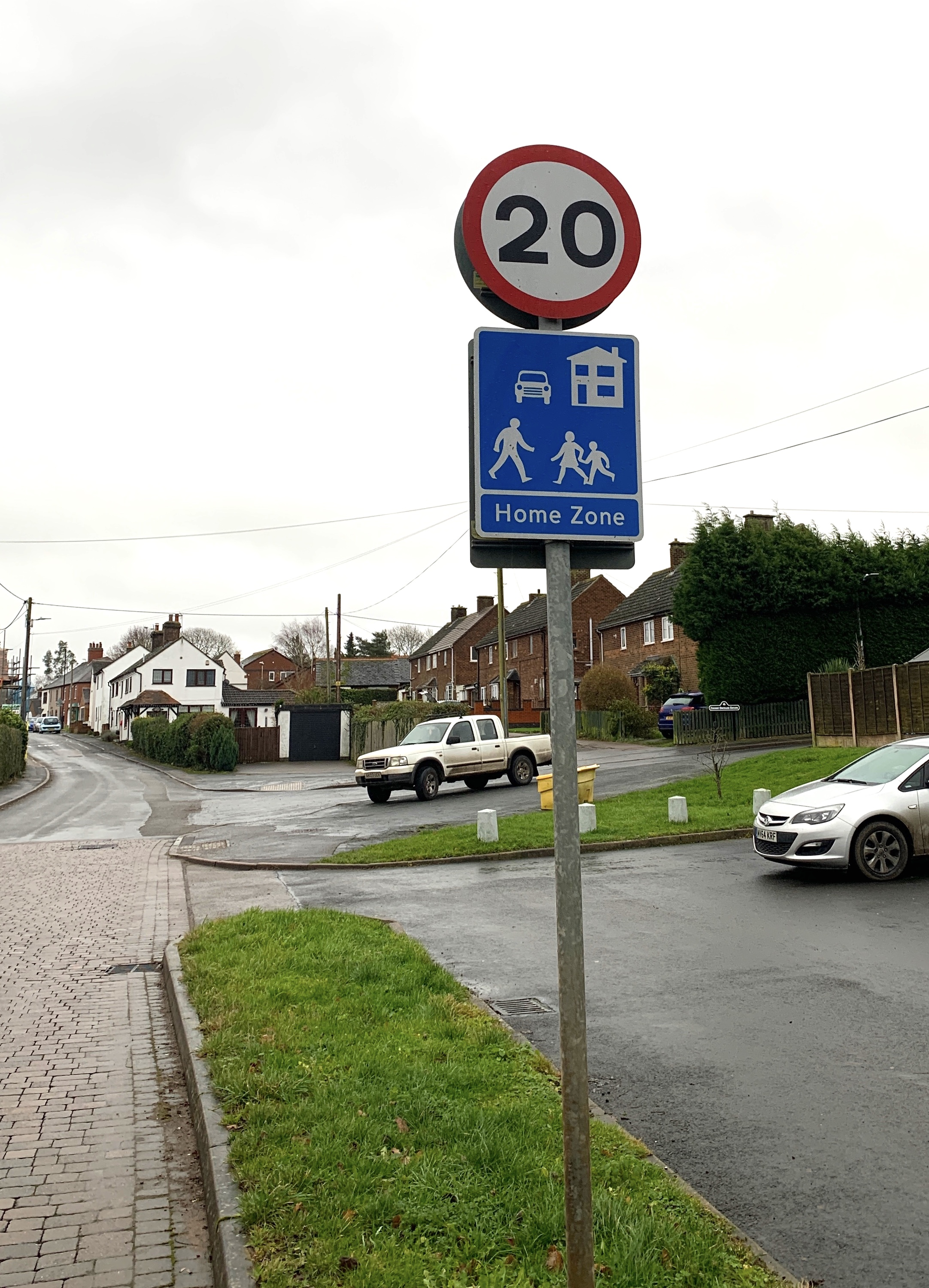
Home zone sign in Higham on the Hill, Nuneaton, UK

The main enabling legislation for home zones is given in section 268 of the Transport Act 2000 which allows the creation of 'use orders' which are orders that 'permit the use of a road for purposes other than passage' such as social interaction and children's play. In 2002 Farley Bank, a cul-de-sac in Hastings was designated as a Play Street giving children traffic-free space for play between 8am and sunset.

=== Quiet Lane ===
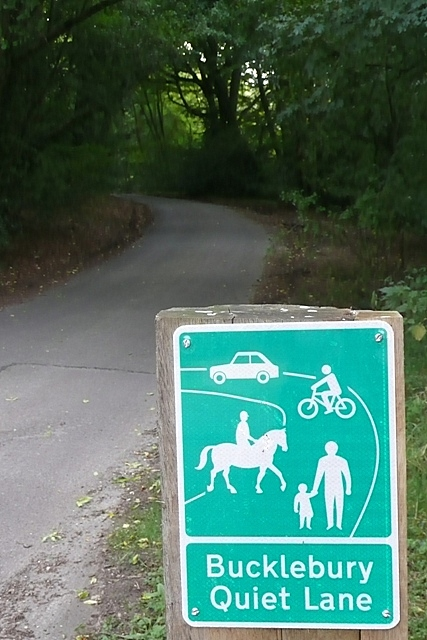
Signage indicating a Quiet Lane.

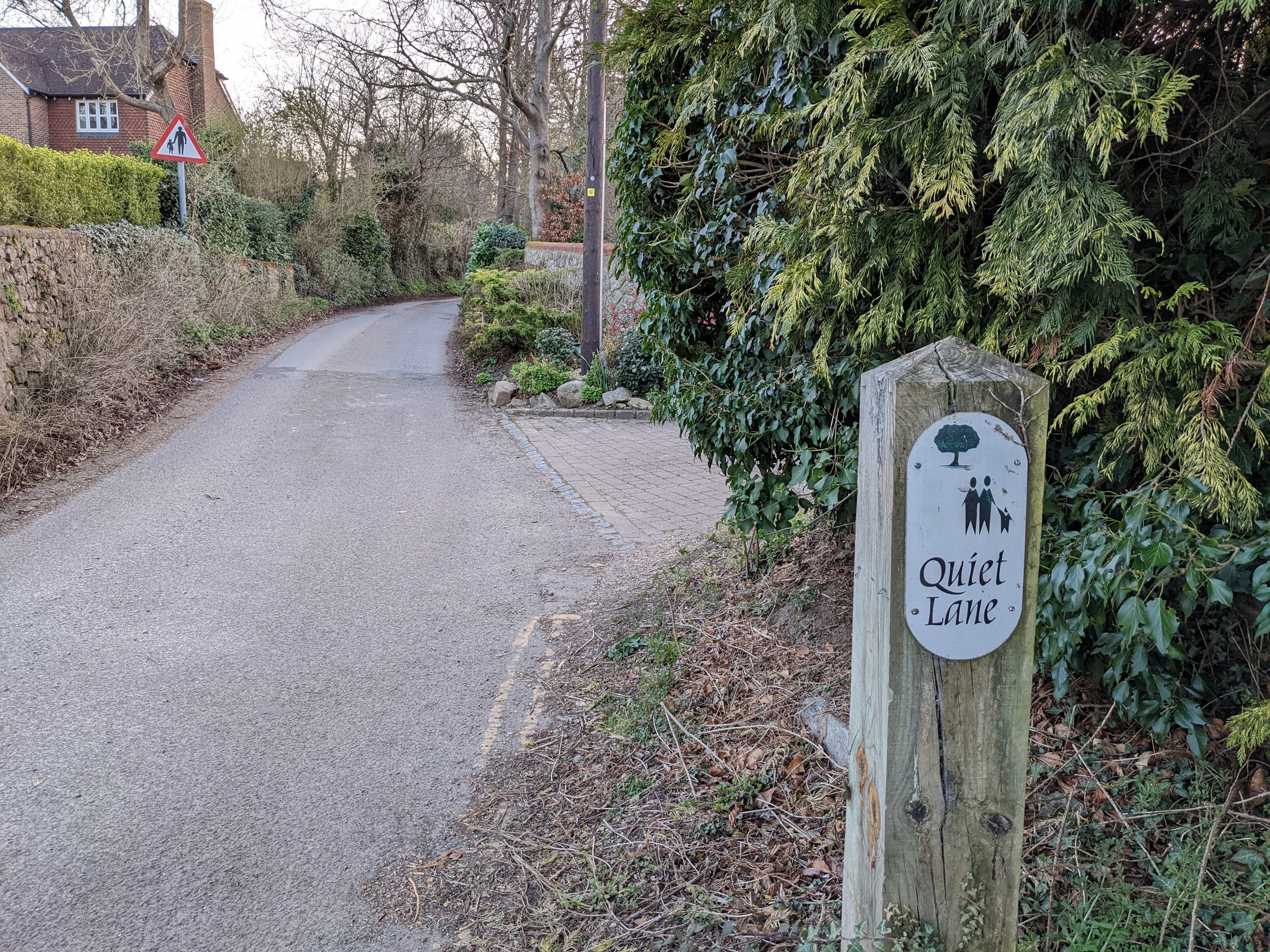
Quiet Lane in East Malling, Kent

The same act introduced the concept of the Quiet Lane which allows similar social uses in rural roads, following pilot projects in Kent, Norfolk and Ayot St Peter in Hertfordshire.

== Principles ==
These principles are similar to those of the shared space type schemes, which apply also to a wider range of environments and follow closely the pattern of the Dutch woonerf schemes.

Encouraging children's play is an aim of many home zone schemes. Home zones have a good safety record, but are not primarily designed as road safety schemes.

Home zones are encouraged by the UK Government as part of new residential areas. Although it is not possible for prospective residents to be involved in the design of new streets, steps can be taken to involve them in their maintenance and management. Residents must be need to be consulted by the local Traffic Authority on the precise uses that can take place on the street (specified through a 'Use Order') and the appropriate speed of traffic on the street (specified through a 'Speed Order') before the home zone can be legally designated and signed.

Home zones often involved the use of shared space, where the street is not strongly divided into exclusive pedestrian and traffic areas. Concerns have been expressed over the inability of blind and partially sighted people to use shared space streets. Providing a clear route for pedestrians that is kept free of traffic, by using street furniture for example, is one way of meeting the needs of the visually impaired.

Well-designed home zones often include features such as benches, tables and play equipment to encourage social interaction. Street trees and areas of planting, ideally maintained by residents, will often feature. On-street parking also forms part of the layout in most schemes.

Traffic speeds are kept low – with a typical target speed being around 20 km/h (10–15 mph) – through the overall design of the street and features such as sharp changes of direction for traffic and narrowings where only one motor vehicle can pass at a time. Traditional traffic calming features such as road humps can also be used, but should be integrated into the design rather than being added as an engineered afterthought.

Examples of UK practice include Staiths South Bank in Gateshead, which at over 600 homes was the largest newbuild home zone development in the UK at the time it received planning consent. Most contemporary UK schemes have involved public realm works to existing streets in older Victorian housing areas, often to meet regeneration or traffic calming objectives.
