= School street =

Pedestrian street in front of a school

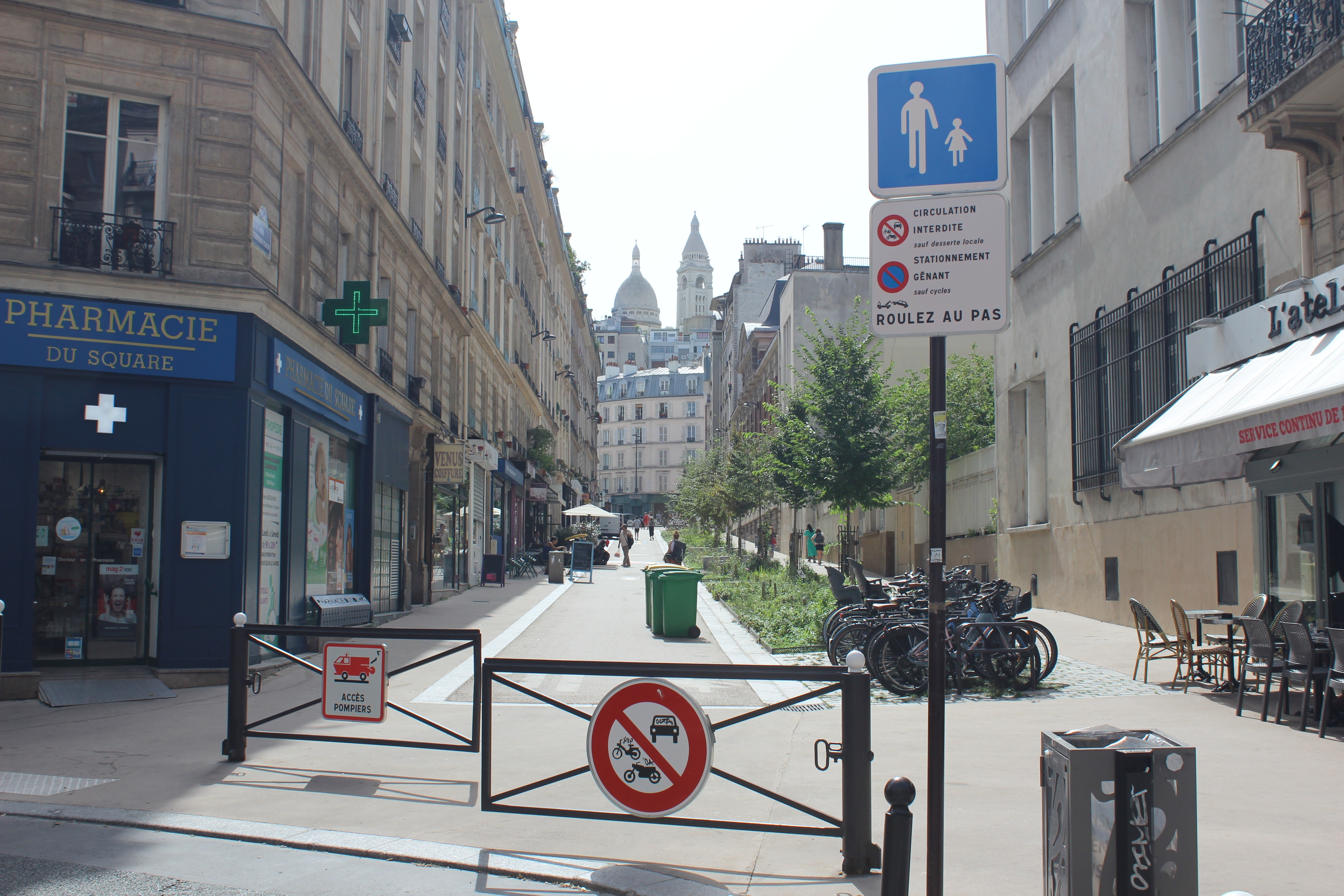
School street in Paris, permanently pedestrianized.

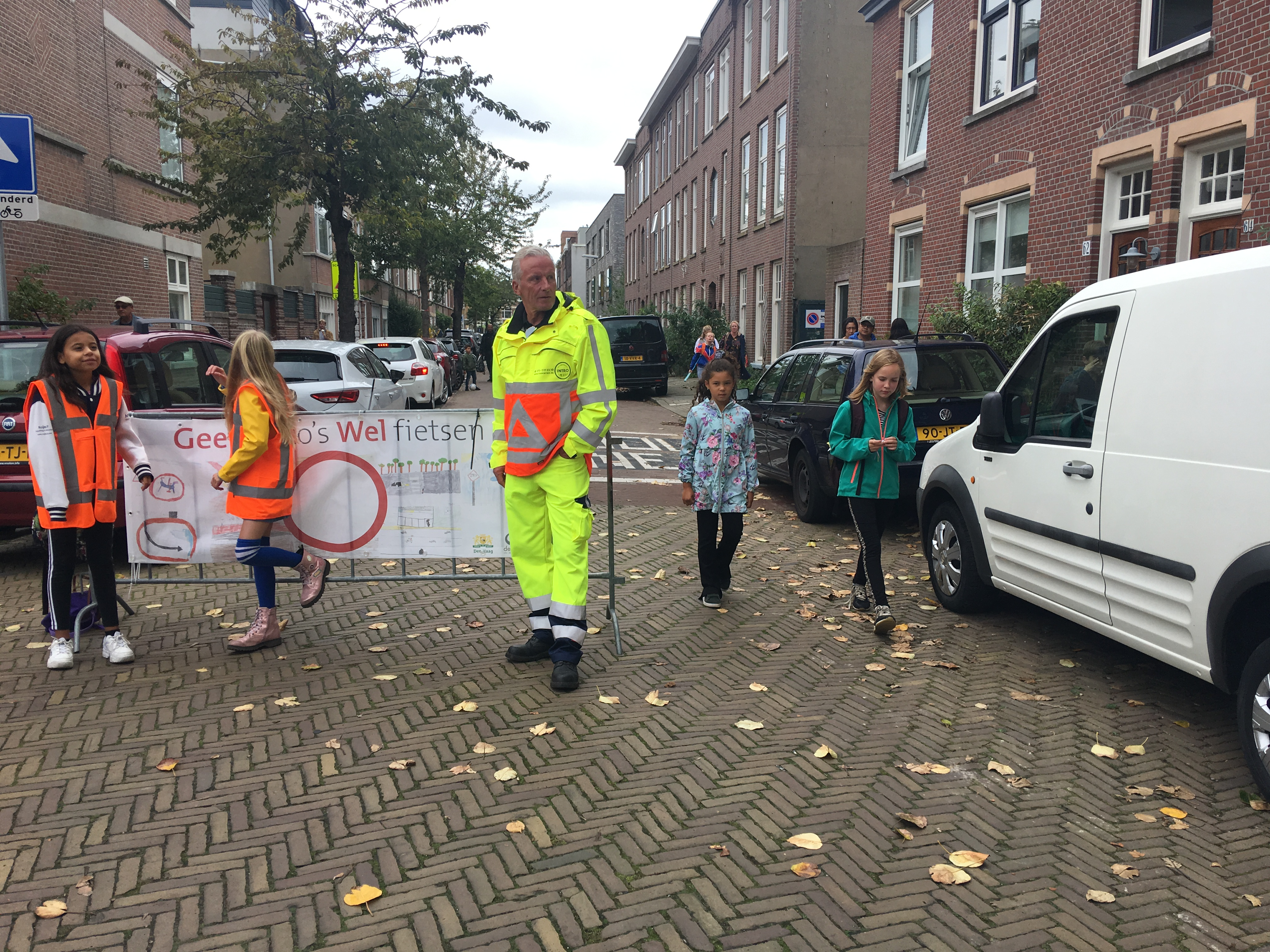
School street in The Hague, with temporary traffic restrictions during school drop-off and pick-up hours.

A school street is a street located near an educational institution which is pedestrianized, either at all times or at least during school start and end times.

The aim of a school street is to calm traffic, make the street safer, and encourage students to walk or cycle, thereby promoting their autonomy. Vehicle restrictions create a virtuous cycle: as routes become safer, more people travel to school on foot or by bicycle, which in turn further reduces traffic.

== Implementation ==
School streets have been implemented in numerous countries and cities, such as Belgium, France, the Netherlands, and the United Kingdom. The city of Paris stands out in particular, having permanently pedestrianized more than 300 streets in front of educational centers, with the goal of ensuring that all schools are located on pedestrian streets by 2030.

Whilst traffic in general is prohibited from using a school street during its operation time, arrangements may allow for disabled road users, emergency vehicles and deliveries to have access.

== See also ==
- Bike bus – Group of utility cyclists
- Walking bus – Chaperoned student group on foot
- Complete streets – Transportation policy and design approach
- Naked street – Road designed without traditional signs
- Living street – Traffic calming in spaces shared between road users
- Walkability – How accessible a space is to walking
- Cyclability – Degree of the ease of cycling
- 15-minute city – Urban accessibility concept
- Shared space – Roads unsegregated by travel mode
- Traffic calming – Road design measures that raise the safety of pedestrians and motorists
- Urban vitality – Intensity of use of an urban area
- Street reclamation – Changing streets to focus on non-car use
- Self-explaining road – Design of roads to not rely on signage
