= Street reclamation =

Changing streets to focus on non-car use

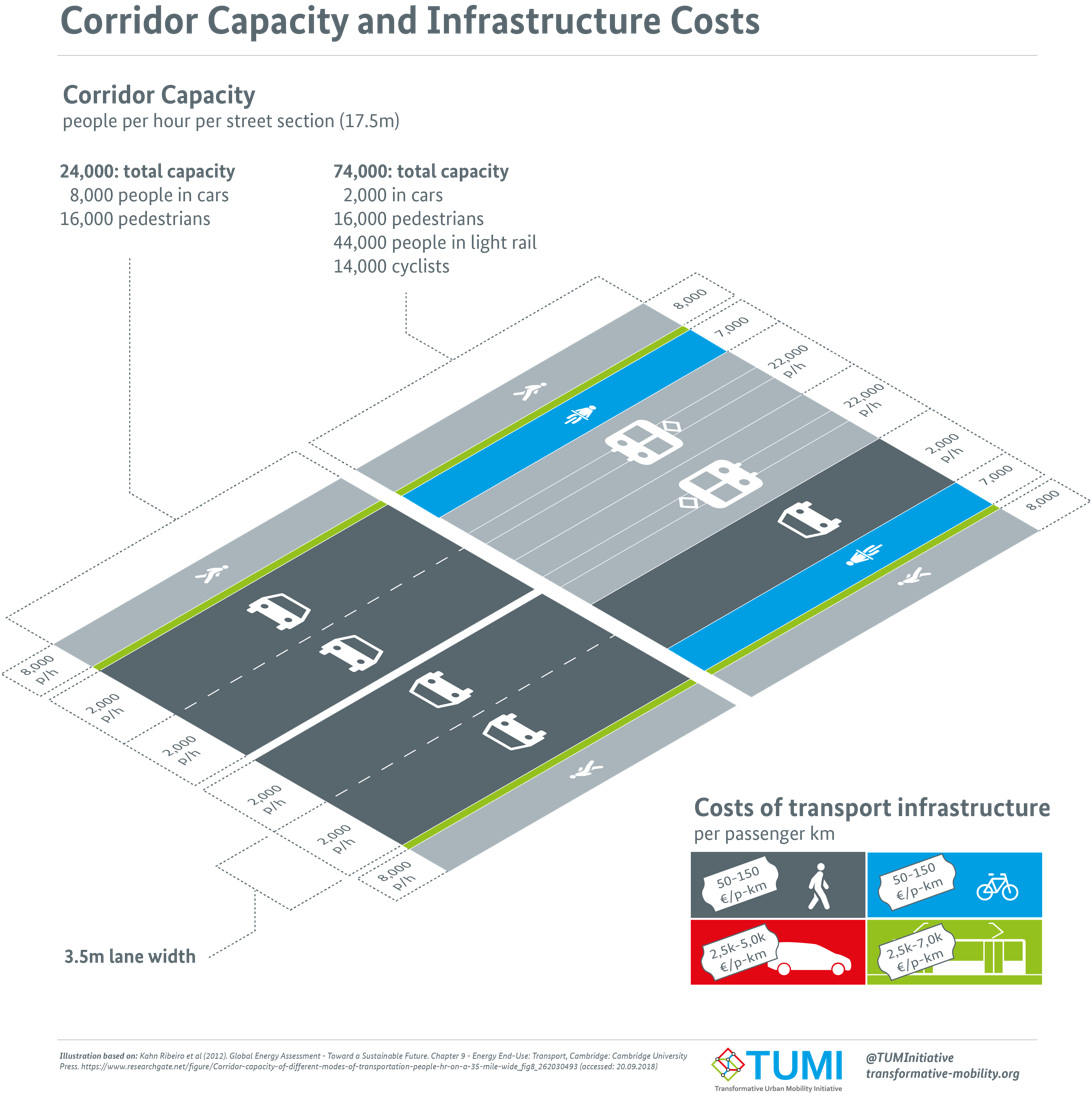
A comparison of road corridor capacity and street infrastructure costs

Street reclaiming is the process of converting, or otherwise returning streets to a stronger focus on non-car use — such as walking, cycling and active street life. It is advocated by many urban planners and urban economists, of widely varying political points of view. Its primary benefits are thought to be:

- Decreased automobile traffic with less noise pollution, fewer automobile accidents, reduced smog and air pollution
- Greater safety and access for pedestrians and cyclists
- Less frequent surface maintenance than car-driven roads
- Reduced summer temperatures due to less asphalt and more green spaces
- Increased pedestrian traffic which also increases social and commercial opportunities
- Increased gardening space for urban residents
- Better support for co-housing and infirm residents, e.g. suburban eco-villages built around former streets

Superblocks, a form of street reclamation, are city areas where traffic is relegated to the exterior rim. According to the Barcelona Institute for Global Health, 667 annual premature deaths could be avoided through their implementation city-wide. The superblock method has also been found to mitigate air pollution, city noise, and urban heat island effect.

== Global Initiatives ==
An early example of street reclamation was the Stockholm carfree day in 1969.

Some consider the best advantages to be gained by redesigning streets, for example as shared space, while others, such as campaigns like "Reclaim the Streets", a widespread "dis-organization", run a variety of events to physically reclaim the streets for political and artistic actions, often called street parties. David Engwicht is also a strong proponent of the concept that street life, rather than physical redesign, is the primary tool of street reclamation.

=== Seoul, South Korea ===
For centuries the Cheonggyecheon stream functioned as the principal waterway through what is now downtown Seoul. Following the Korean War, an influx of refugees established informal settlements along its banks, and worsening sanitation conditions prompted the city to concrete over the stream from 1958. In 1976, an elevated four-lane highway was built above it which, at its peak, hosted over 170,000 vehicles crossing daily.

When repairs were needed, the Seoul Metropolitan Government opted to remove the structure instead, replacing the 5.8-kilometer corridor with pedestrian-oriented public space along a restored stream. Public engagement was extensive, with close to 4,000 meetings held with residents, during the planning process. The project was funded entirely by the Seoul Metropolitan Government at a cost of 386,739 KRW (approximately 345 million USD).

Following completion in 2005, bus ridership across the city rose by 15.1% and subway ridership by 3.3% between 2003 and 2008, vehicle traffic in the area declined, and the corridor began attracting around 64,000 daily visitors. Ecologically, biodiversity along the stream increased by 639% between 2003 and 2008, and temperatures measured along the waterway ran 3.3-5.9 °C below those recorded on parallel roads several blocks away.

=== Utrecht, Netherlands ===
When Utrecht received its city charter in 1122, a moat was constructed around the settlement not long after. The waterway remained central to the city for centuries, later serving as an industrial port before that function relocated to the outskirts in the early 20th century. A proposal in the late 1950s by a German urban engineer to drain the entire moat and replace it with a four-lane ring road was embraced by the city council, keen to modernize, but it faced significant backlash from the public. The national government stepped in to protect the east and south sections as monuments in 1966, but the north-west stretch was left unprotected, and a motorway was constructed there, opening in stages from 1973. As the river-fed waterway couldn't simply be filled in, its water was piped underground. The resulting road was seen as too short and disconnected to serve any meaningful traffic function, and its entire length could be spanned in under a minute of driving, earning it the nickname "the motorway from nothing to nowhere".

Civic pressure to reverse the decision began almost immediately, with a campaign group forming in 1970, later joined by a group called "Utrecht weer omsingeld" ("Utrecht surrounded by its city moat again"). The city council agreed to examine the feasibility of restoring the canal in 1989, and a decade later voted to proceed. The motorway, still carrying 11 lanes of traffic when it was decommissioned, closed in early 2010. Water returned to the restored canal in December 2015, reverting the moat to its original state of over eight centuries.

=== Quelimane, Mozambique ===
Despite having developed one of Mozambique's first dedicated bicycle lanes and a comparatively strong culture of cycling, Quelimane faced severe road safety risks for non-motorized users. In 2022, coinciding with celebrations for the city's 80th anniversary, a partnership between UN-Habitat, the Institute for Transportation and Development Policy, and local authorities launched activities in the city under the United Nations Road Safety Fund-backed "Reclaiming the Streets for Pedestrians and Cyclists in Africa" project, which operated across five countries. A junction identified as particularly dangerous was selected for a participatory tactical urbanism intervention, bringing together civil society organizations and municipal authorities to redesign the space so that pedestrians, cyclists, and other vulnerable road users (such as children, elderly people, and people with disabilities) could navigate it more safely.

=== Fortaleza, Brazil ===
A low-cost intervention in the "Cidade 2000" neighborhood of Fortaleza displayed how quickly the reallocation of road space can shift both behavior and perception. Working with the Global Designing Cities Initiative, city officials transformed a section of Avenida Central over two nights using paint, planters, benches, and new pedestrian crossings, converting more than 1,200 square meters of parking into a public plaza while preserving a narrow lane for local vehicle access.

The share of street space dedicated to people rose from 21% to 73%, and pedestrian numbers in the area grew by 350%. The proportion of local residents who described themselves as feeling safe crossing the street jumped from 11% to 80%, with 94% rating the transformed space as good or very good, all while vehicle throughput across the neighborhood remained unchanged. Locals who had petitioned against the project before it was built subsequently organized in support of making it permanent.

== See also ==
- Bicycle-friendly – Urban planning prioritising cycling
- Carfree day – Day promoting car-free travel
- Cyclability – Degree of the ease of cycling
- Cycling advocacy – Activities promoting cycling
- Cycling infrastructure – Facilities for use by cyclists
- Green infrastructure – Sustainable and resilient infrastructure
- Greenway (landscape) – Shared-use path or linear park with vegetation
- Intersection daylighting – Enhancing visibility at intersections to improve safety
- Linear park – Long strip of naturally occurring land for recreation
- Living street – Traffic calming in spaces shared between road users
- Living Streets (UK) – UK charity for everyday walking
- Pedestrian zone – Urban car-free area reserved for pedestrian use
- Reclaim the Streets – Advocacy group for community ownership of public spaces
- Right to mobility – Right to move in a safe, accessible, equitable and sustainable manner
- Road diet – Transportation planning technique
- Road expansion – Increasing rate at which roads are being constructed worldwide
- School street – Pedestrian street in front of a school
- Sustainable city – City designed with consideration for social, economic, and environmental impact
- Tactical urbanism – Low-cost, temporary improvement to a city
- Transport geography
- Urban green space – Green area in an urban location
- Urban vitality – Intensity of use of an urban area
- Walkability – How accessible a space is to walking
- Walking audit – Assessment of pedestrian accessibility
- Wildlife corridor – Connecting wild territories for animals
