= Green transport hierarchy =

Prioritising vulnerable sustainable road users

Green transport hierarchy
Pedestrians
Bicycles
Public transit
Trucks and commercial vehicles
Taxis
High occupancy vehicles
Cars and single occupancy vehicles

The green transport hierarchy (Canada), also called mobility pyramid, reverse traffic pyramid, street user hierarchy (US), sustainable transport hierarchy (Wales), urban transport hierarchy or road user hierarchy (Australia, UK) is a hierarchy of modes of passenger transport prioritising green transport. It is a concept used in transport reform groups worldwide and in policy design. The UK Highway Code has a road user hierarchy prioritising pedestrians. It is a key characteristic of Australian transport planning.

== History ==
The Green Transportation Hierarchy: A Guide for Personal & Public Decision-Making by Chris Bradshaw was first published September 1994. As part of a pedestrian advocacy group in the United States, he proposed the hierarchy ranking passenger transport based on environmental emissions. The reviewed ranking listed, in order: walking, cycling, public transport, car sharing, and finally private car.

It was first prepared for Ottawalk and the Transportation Working Committee of the Ottawa-Carleton Round-table on the Environment in January 1992, only stating 'Walk, Cycle, Bus, Truck, Car'.

== Factors ==
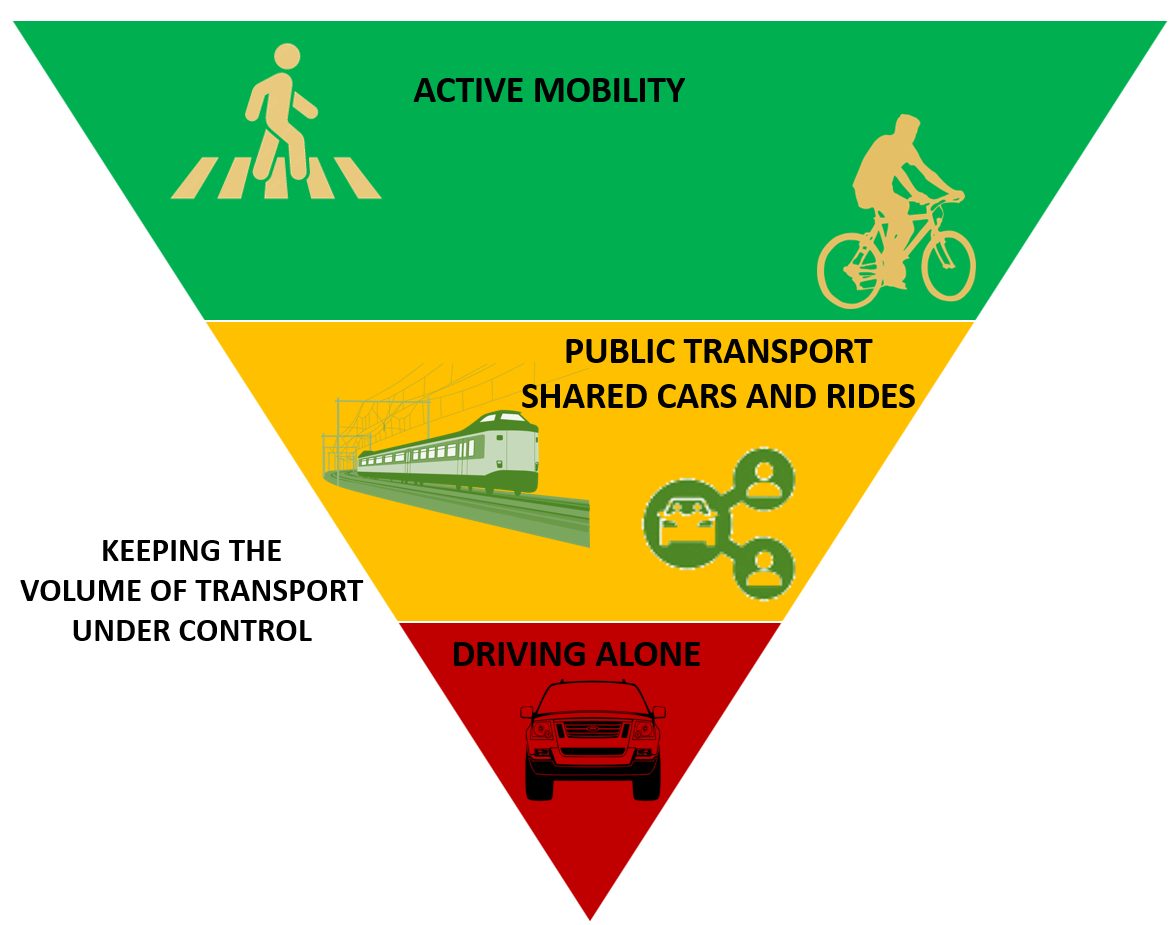
Infographic claiming that the mobility pyramid is important for the mobility transition

1. Mode
2. Energy source
3. Trip length
4. Trip speed
5. Vehicle size
6. Passenger load factor
7. Trip segment
8. Trip purpose
9. Traveller

== Adoption ==
Chris Bradshaw directed the hierarchy at both individual lifestyle choices and public authorities who should officially direct their resources – funds, moral suasion, and formal sanctions – based on the factors.

Bradshaw described the hierarchy to be logical, but the effect of applying it to seem radical.

Bradshaw introduced the concept of the green transportation hierarchy, which ranks mobility modes based on their sustainability. In this hierarchy, walking and cycling are prioritized as the most sustainable forms of transport, followed by public transit, while driving a private car is placed at the bottom.

== See also ==
- Alternatives to car use
- Bicycle-friendly
- Bill Boaks campaigned for pedestrian priority everywhere
- Car-free movement
- Complete streets
- Cycling advocacy
- Cyclability
- Health and environmental impact of transport
- Health impact of light rail systems
- Induced demand
- Jaywalking
- Peak car
- Planetizen
- Priority (right of way)
- Reclaim the Streets
- Right to mobility
- Road hierarchy
- Road traffic safety
- Traffic § Rules of the road
- Settlement hierarchy
- Street hierarchy
- Street reclamation
- Sustainable transport
- Traffic bottleneck
- Traffic code
- Traffic conflict
- Traffic flow
- Transportation demand management
- Transport ecology#Tautology of transport ecology
- Walkability
- Walking audit
