= Naked street =

Road designed without traditional signs

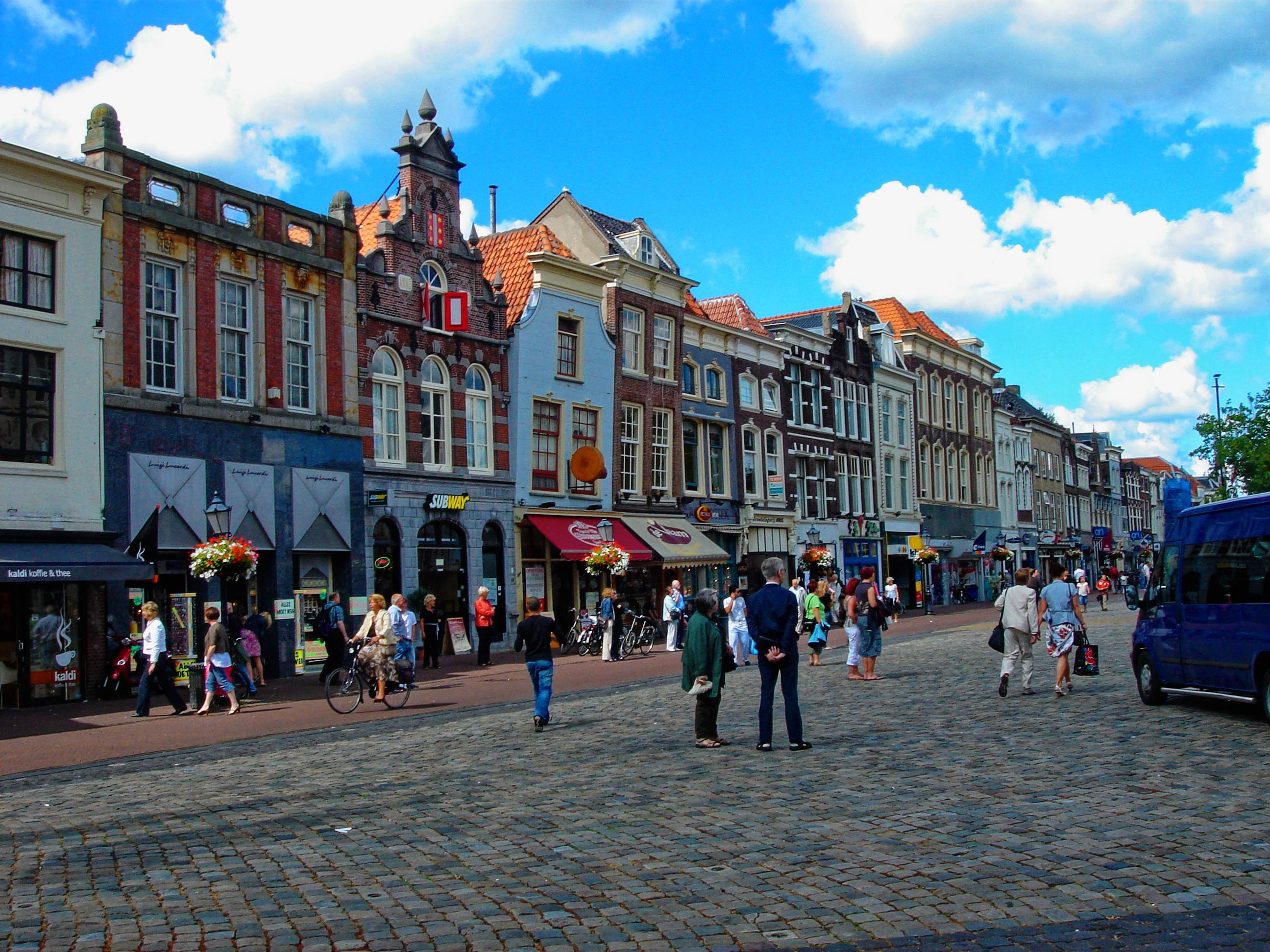
Dutch cities have spent decades reducing street signage and implementing traffic calming measures, lowering the number of accidents.

Naked streets are an urban design concept that involves removing or minimizing traditional traffic-regulation elements such as vertical signs, traffic lights, road markings, or strict physical separations between pedestrians, bicycles, and vehicles. The aim of this model is to create a public space in which pedestrians, cyclists, and drivers negotiate its use through observation and direct interaction, rather than relying on explicit rules to regulate movement. In these types of streets, the goal is to encourage a more flexible, friendly, and human-centered use of public roads by avoiding the externalization of personal responsibility onto traffic rules.

The fundamental principle of naked streets is to place greater responsibility on road users. As many traffic signs disappear, drivers and pedestrians must pay closer attention to their surroundings and communicate with each other, especially through eye contact at crossings or intersections. This situation forces people to make more conscious decisions, which leads to reduced vehicle speeds and increased overall caution among all users of public space.

This approach is related to the concept of shared space, in which the traditional separation between roadway and sidewalk becomes blurred or even disappears, allowing different users to negotiate the use of space more directly. It is also linked to the idea of self-explaining streets, a road-design model in which the physical configuration of the street itself intuitively communicates how it should be used. Traffic calming elements such as the width of the carriageway, the type of pavement, or the placement of street furniture influence the behavior of drivers and pedestrians, guiding their actions without the need for signs. In this way, the design of the environment helps promote movement that is more attentive, cautious, and adapted to the urban context.

== See also ==
- Complete street
- School street
- Human scale
- Living street
- Pedestrian zone
- Self-explaining road
- Shared space
- Sustainable urbanism
- Urban vitality
