= Complete streets =

Transportation policy and design approach

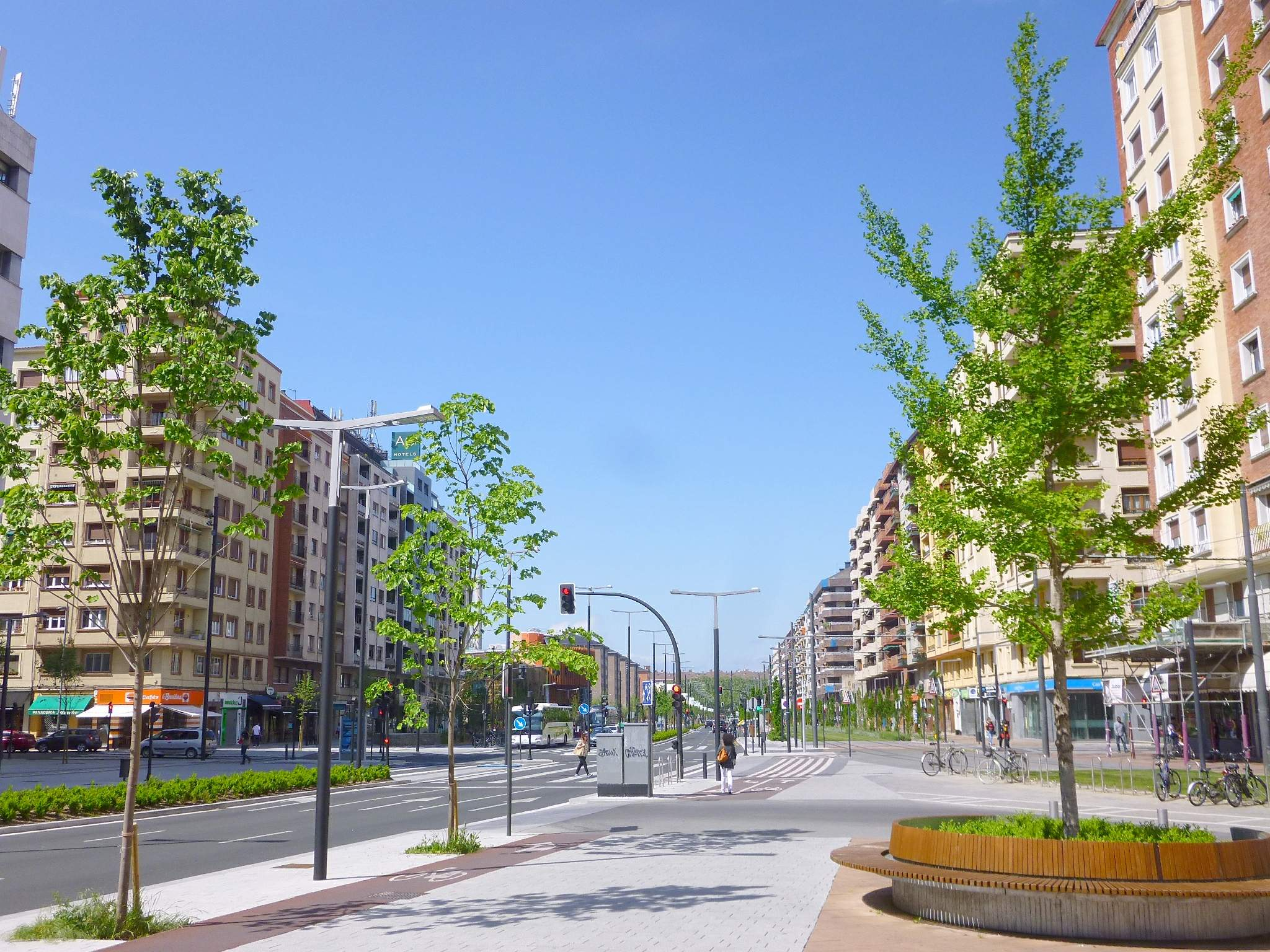
Gasteiz avenue in Vitoria is an example of a complete street. It includes sidewalks with trees, user-friendly furniture, public drinking water fountains, segregated, linear, and interconnected bike lanes, exclusive spaces for public transport and the roadway.

Complete streets is a transportation policy and design approach that requires streets to be planned, designed, operated and maintained to enable safe, convenient and comfortable travel and access for users of all ages and abilities regardless of their mode of transportation. Complete Streets allow for safe travel by those walking, cycling, driving automobiles, riding public transportation, or delivering goods.

The term is often used by transportation advocates, urban planners, traffic and highway engineers, public health practitioners, and community members in the United States and Canada. Complete Streets are promoted as offering improved safety, health, economic, and environmental outcomes. Complete Streets emphasize the importance of safe access for all users, not just automobiles.

Related concepts include living streets, Woonerf, and home zones.

== History ==
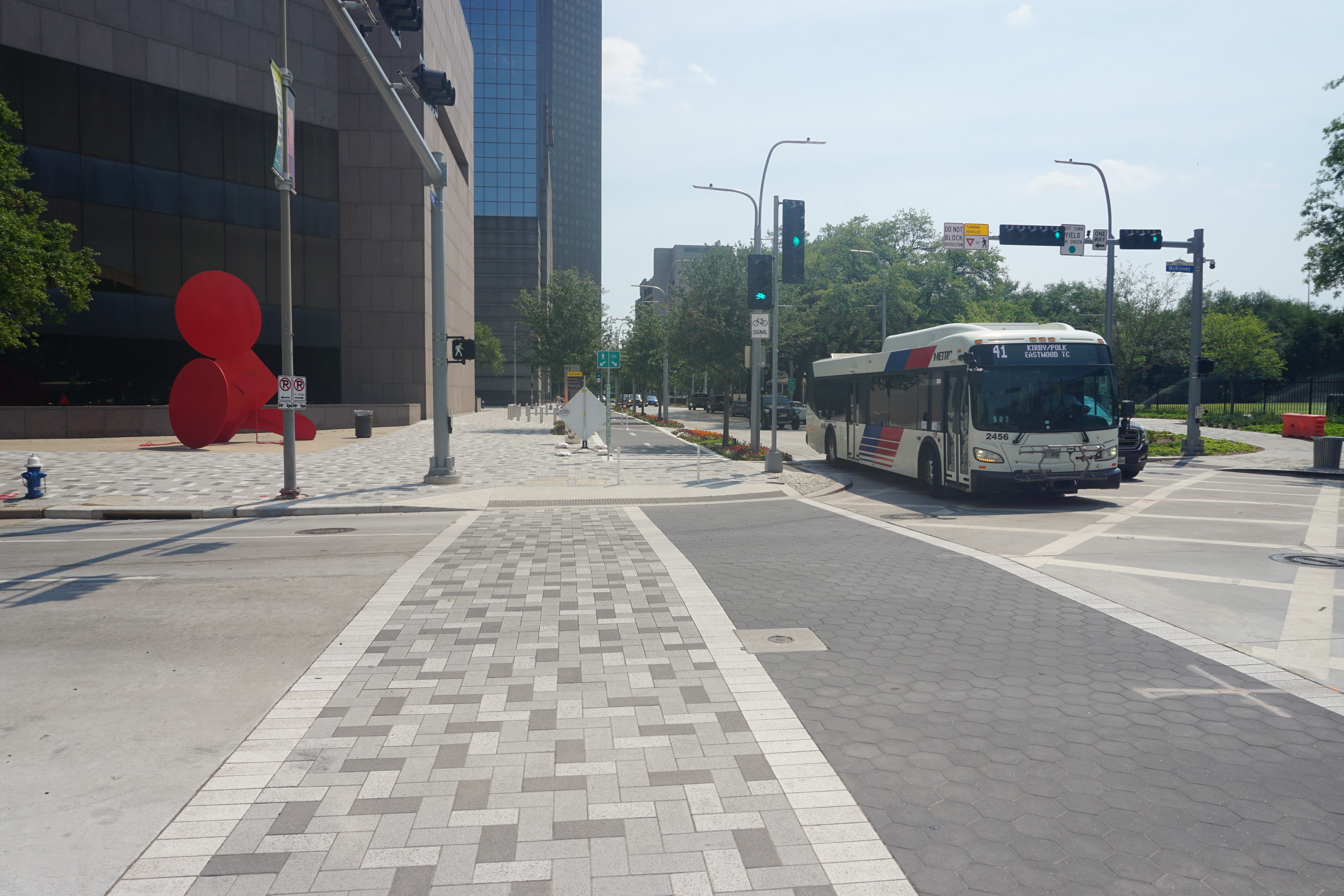
Crosswalk, bike path, and Houston Metro bus in Houston in 2022

After World War II, many communities in the United States were designed to facilitate easy and fast access to destinations via automobile. In rural and suburban communities, people often rely on the automobile as their sole means of transportation and even in areas with public transportation and safe places to walk and bicycle, they live in a state of automobile dependence wherein automobiles are the central focus of transportation, infrastructure and land use policies to the extent that other modes of transportation, such as walking, cycling and mass transit, have become impractical.

Oregon enacted the first Complete Streets-like policy in the United States in 1971, requiring that new or rebuilt roads accommodate bicycles and pedestrians, and also calling on state and local governments to fund pedestrian and bicycle facilities in the public right-of-way. Since then, 16 additional state legislatures have adopted Complete Streets laws.

In 2003, Barbara McCann, who would later become the Executive Director of the National Complete Streets Coalition, coordinated a search for a replacement for the term "routine accommodation." The term "complete streets" was suggested by David Goldberg, the communications director for Smart Growth America, and it was adopted by a coalition of advocacy groups to refer both to a comprehensive approach to street design and to the coalition itself.

The National Complete Streets Coalition was founded in 2005 by a coalition of advocacy and trade groups, including AARP, the American Planning Association and the American Society of Landscape Architects. The American Public Transportation Association, Blue Cross Blue Shield Minnesota, the National Association of Realtors, and the Institute of Transportation Engineers are examples of other current Coalition Steering Committee members.

Federal complete streets legislation was proposed in 2008 and 2009, but failed to become law.

In 2010, the U.S. Department of Transportation issued a policy statement on bicycle and pedestrian accommodation, declaring its support for their inclusion in federal-aid transportation projects and encouraging community organizations, public transportation agencies, and state and local governments to adopt similar policies.

By early 2013, more than 490 jurisdictions in United States had adopted a Complete Streets policy, including twenty-seven states, the District of Columbia, and the Commonwealth of Puerto Rico. Some of these jurisdictions passed legislation enacting their policies into law, while others chose to implemented their policies by executive order or internal policy. Still more jurisdictions have passed non-binding resolutions in support of Complete Streets, or created transportation plans that incorporate Complete Streets principles.

A federal Complete Streets Act has been introduced in the U.S. House of Representatives and Senate in 2019 and 2021, based on a similar Massachusetts law.

== Design elements ==
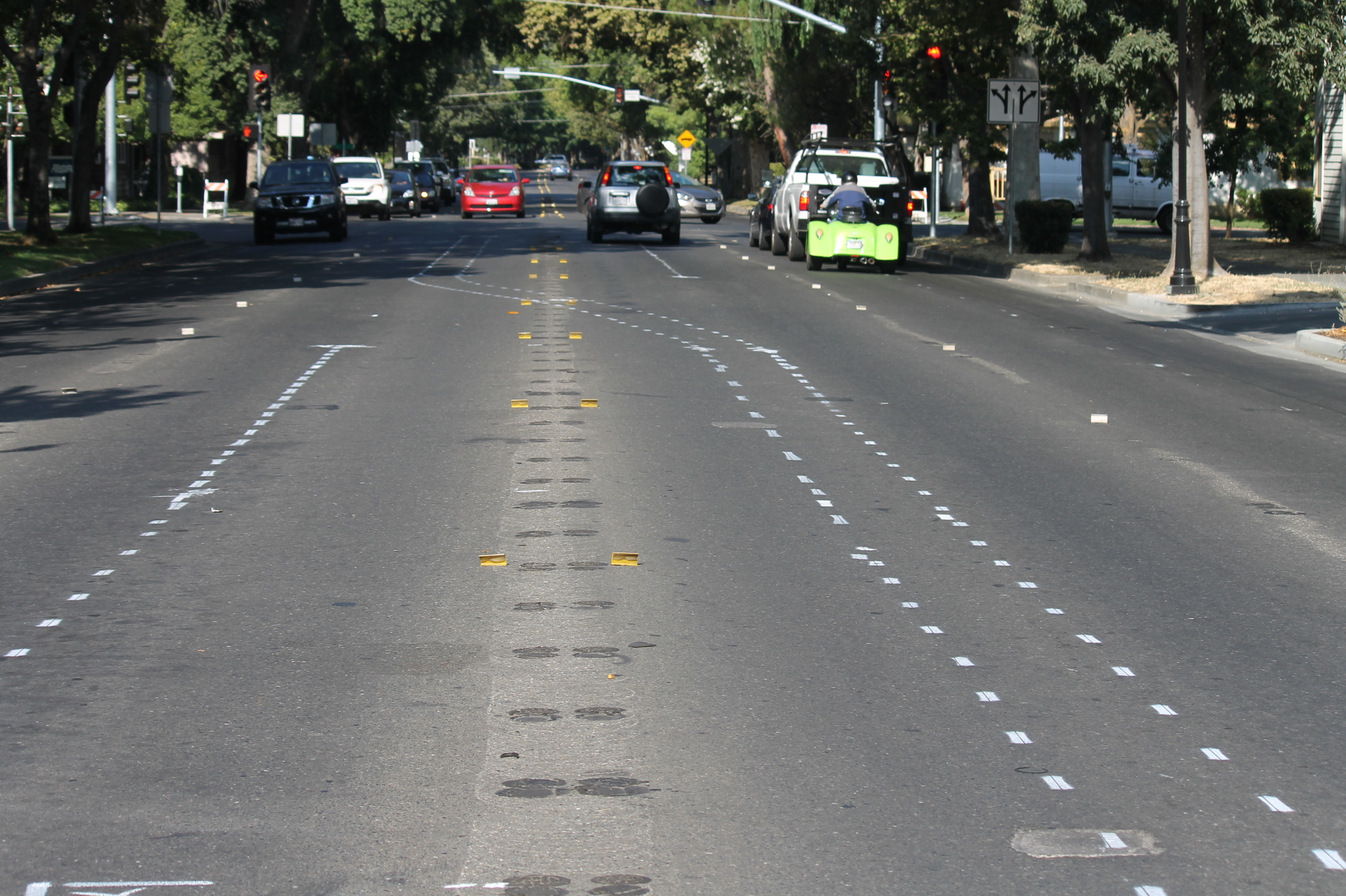
Four traffic lanes were changed into two traffic lanes plus bike lanes and left-turn lanes.

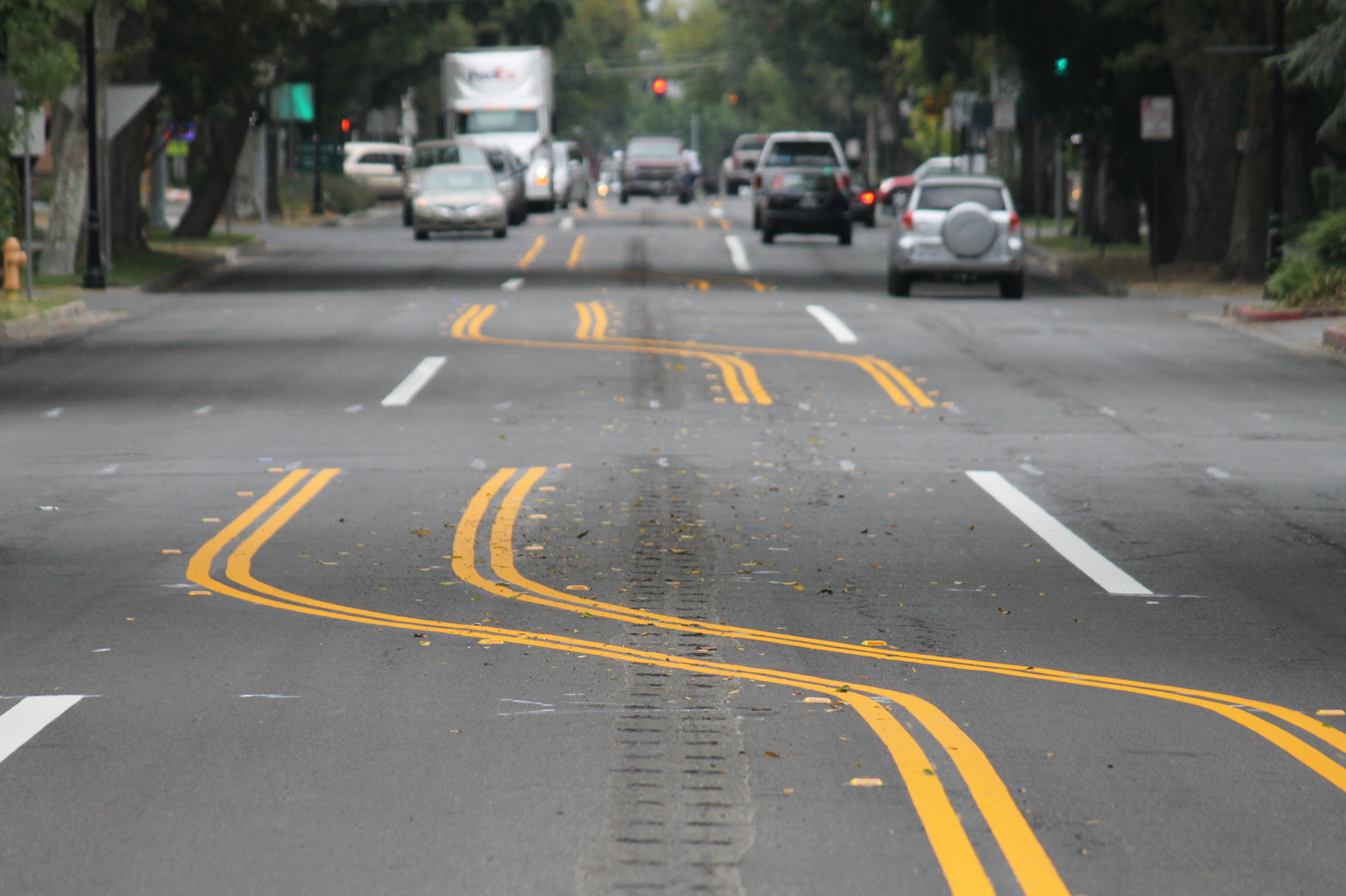
New road distribution in Davis, California. Now pedestrians and cyclists have better safety conditions.

The specific design elements of Complete Streets vary, based on context and project goals, but they may include:

- Pedestrian infrastructure such as sidewalks; traditional and raised crosswalks; median crossing islands; Americans with Disabilities Act of 1990 compliant facilities including audible cues for people with low vision, pushbuttons reachable by people in wheelchairs, and curb cuts; and curb extensions.
- Traffic calming measures to lower speeds of automobiles and define the edges of automobile travel lanes, including a road diet, intersection daylighting, center medians, shorter curb corner radii, elimination of free-flow right-turn lanes, angled, face-out parking, street trees, planter strips and ground cover.
- Bicycle accommodations, such as protected or dedicated bicycle lanes, neighborhood greenways, wide paved shoulders, and bicycle parking.
- Public transit accommodations, such as bus rapid transit, bus pullouts, transit signal priority, bus shelters, and dedicated bus lanes.

Such elements have been used successfully in projects across the United States as shown in the following examples:

- In Orlando, Florida, a road diet was employed to reduce Edgewater Drive from 4 lanes to 3 with bike lanes and streetscape beautifications. The change reduced crashes 35 percent and increased bicycling and walking 23 and 30 percent respectively. The change also helped spur economic development and was claimed to enhance the neighborhood's sense of place.
- In Charlotte, North Carolina, a redesign on East Boulevard completed in three phases converted a 4 lanes into 3 lanes and improved left-turn access for vehicles.
- In New York City, transit improvements through Select Bus Service included off-board fare payment to speed boarding times and dedicated lanes for buses. As a result, bus speeds increased 20 percent and total number of bus riders increased 10 percent. In addition, Fordham Road's locally based businesses saw a 71 percent increase in retail sales, compared to 23 percent borough-wide.
- Marin County, California, added bike lanes to the busy Alameda del Prado roadway. As a result, the area saw a 366 percent increase in weekday bicyclists and 540 percent increase in weekend bicyclists.

Complete Streets policies normally allow for three kinds of exceptions to roadway projects: freeways or other roads where non-motorized transportation is banned by law; roadways where the cost of accommodation would be too disproportionate to the need or expected use; and roadways where lack of present and future need is shown to make accommodation unnecessary.

== Benefits ==
Proponents of Complete Streets policies believe that they improve safety, lower transportation costs, provide transportation alternatives, encourage health through walking and biking, stimulate local economies, create a sense of place, improve social interaction, and generally improve adjacent property values. Opponents may consider automobile-only infrastructure to be a better use of public funds, or consider efforts to encourage other forms of transportation to be coercive. Individual projects and policies have sometimes faced specific local opposition, typically based on concerns over traffic flow and automobile access.

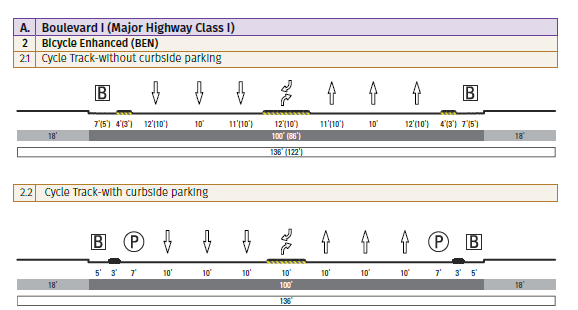
A diagram showing a guide to complete streets in Los Angeles with emphasis on bicyclist safety

=== Safety ===
Complete streets policies are meant in part to improve safety, and various studies suggest that Complete Streets principles have done so. A Federal Highway Administration safety review found that designing the street with pedestrians in mind—sidewalks, raised medians, turning access controls, better bus stop placement, better lighting, traffic calming measures, and treatments for disabled travelers—all improve pedestrian, bicyclist and motorist safety. Rates of pedestrian injuries and fatalities decrease 88% when sidewalks are added, 69% hybrid beacon signals are added, and 39% when medians are added. The University of Oregon published a before and after study of 25 complete street projects and found significant automobile speed crash reductions for projects throughout the country.

=== Health ===
A variety of reports and organizations have suggested that complete streets policies could improve public health by promoting walking and bicycling. The U.S. Centers for Disease Control and Prevention recommend adoption of a Complete Streets policy as a strategy to prevent obesity. A report of the National Conference of State Legislatures named Complete Streets policies as the most effective policy avenue for encouraging bicycling and walking. One study found that 43% of people with safe places to walk within 10 minutes of home met recommended physical activity levels, while just 27% of those without safe places to walk were active enough. The Institute of Medicine recommends fighting childhood obesity by changing ordinances to encourage construction of sidewalks, bikeways, and other places for physical activity. A report of the National Conference of State Legislators found that complete streets policies are the most effective policy avenue for encouraging bicycling and walking. Over one-third of regular public transit users meet the minimum daily requirement for physical activity.

=== Economic ===
Proponents of Complete Streets believe that as communities become safer, more attractive, and provide more transportation choices, local economies thrive and land values rise.

Successful Complete Streets implementation has helped some communities stimulate local economies. A revitalization project in Lancaster, California, helped create 50 new businesses and over 800 new jobs. After a 2007 Complete Streets redesign in parts of New York City, there was a nearly 50% increase in retail sales on 9th Avenue in Manhattan and a nearly 50% decrease in commercial vacancies in Union Square.

Transit and bicycle/pedestrian projects create more construction jobs than traditional roadway jobs: Complete Streets projects funded through the American Recovery and Reinvestment Act of 2009 created more jobs than projects on road repair and new construction. Under the stimulus, transit projects created nearly twice the job hours for every $1 billion than highway projects. Pedestrian and bicycle projects create between 1.8 and 3.8 more jobs than auto-only projects. This job creation, however, is not a free lunch since it requires greater government expenditure.

=== Environment ===
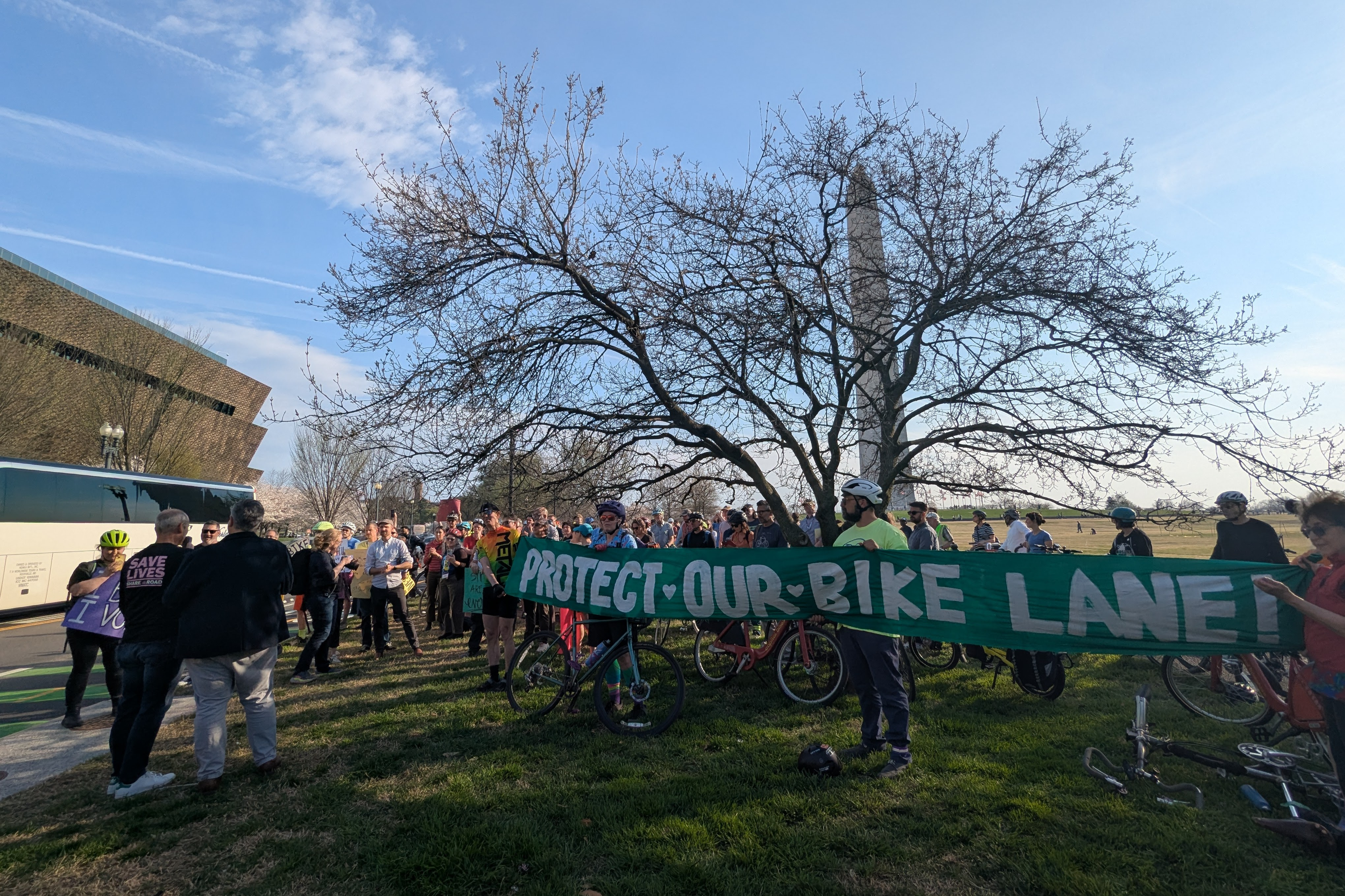
A protest against the planned removal of a bicycle lane in Washington, D.C.

Complete Streets can also have a positive effect on the environment. By providing safe options for people to walk and bike, Complete Streets can lead to fewer people driving in their cars, resulting in lowered automobile emissions.

The 2009 National Household Travel Survey found that 39% of all trips in metropolitan areas are three miles or less and 17% of all trips are one mile or less. Most of these trips can easily be made on foot or bicycle and Complete Streets provide the infrastructure to allow people to safely do so. Traveling by foot or bike are zero-emission means of travel.

Communities with strong Complete Streets policies and implementation, including Boulder, Colorado, see a reduction in their emissions. Over the last several years, fewer people in Boulder drove alone and bicycle and transit trips increased. As a result, the city cut annual carbon dioxide emissions by half a million pounds.

=== Benefits in policy ===
In addition to benefits provided by infrastructural elements of Complete Streets, the development of Complete Streets policy encourages facilitation of community inclusiveness and educational opportunities as well as establishes a context sensitive approach in design and implementation of transportation improvements.

At a total of 899 currently enacted Complete Streets policy documents within U.S. states and territories, the 82 Complete Streets policies passed and enacted in communities in 2015 have been analyzed by the National Complete Streets Coalition in collaboration with Smart Growth America under a policy grading-rubric consisting of comprehensive elements. In this analysis the Coalition found that community outreach and context sensitivity were important characteristics included throughout the documented examples and were weighted considerably in determining the efficiency and effectiveness of examined policies.

Complete Streets implementation is complementary in making sure transportation projects fit within their context in that implementation goals provided within policy align with context sensitive solutions such as instructing municipalities to include public meetings, maintained communication with stake-holders, and street transportation use classification. Additionally, community outreach that is promoted and achieved through educational opportunities of Complete Streets principles helps establish community social connectivity and encourages participation in active transportation modes.

In 2003, the Partnership for Active Communities established a five-year plan to bring together multidisciplinary organizations with the goal of moving toward Complete Streets and improving transportation facilities in the Sacramento, California area. Inter-organizational partnerships and a comprehensive communication plan within the effort lead to awareness of safety issues associated active transportation methods along under-designed infrastructure. Educational opportunities within the project helped solidify connectivity among community members and organizations while working to remedy transportation issues with influence in policy changes.

==== Counterarguments ====
Critics have coined the term "incomplete streets" to refer to this trending redesign of roadways, arguing that a standardized redesign of streets neglects the history and social character of public spaces. Projects have been criticized for the use of standardized, less durable design tools that do not compliment pre-existing spatial characters.

Some have claimed that transportation engineers in the US have become too focused on separating cyclists from pedestrians and motorists. This may limit cyclists' perceptions of where it is acceptable to cycle. This claim is usually lodged by supporters of the controversial practice of vehicular cycling.

== See also ==
- Bicycle-friendly
- Cyclability
- Donald Appleyard
- Green transport hierarchy – Prioritising vulnerable sustainable road users
- Naked street – Road designed without traditional signs
- School street – Pedestrian street in front of a school
- Jaywalking
- Rails to Trails
- Road traffic safety – Methods and measures for reducing the risk of death and injury on roads
- Shared space
- Smart growth
- Right to mobility
- Transit-oriented development
- Urban vitality
- Utility cycling
- Walkability
