= Stop-as-yield =

Type of law affecting bicyclists' actions at controlled intersections

"Idaho Stop" laws in the United States as of May 2026: No specific law / not legal Stop sign as yield legal Stop sign as yield and red light as stop legal

Stop-as-yield laws allow bicyclists to treat a stop sign as a yield sign. Similarly, red-light-as-stop laws let bicyclists treat a red light as a stop sign, although often with significant limitations. The first such law passed in Idaho in 1982, the source of the term "Idaho stop"; it was not emulated elsewhere until Delaware adopted a limited stop-as-yield law, the Delaware Yield, in 2017. in April 2019, Arkansas became the second US state to legalize both stop-as-yield and red-light-as-stop. In France and Belgium, some intersections use red-light-as-yield signs.

These exceptions for bicyclists are intended to address multiple issues, including traffic light sensors that may not recognize cyclists. Similar laws also encourage riders to take safer low-traffic streets instead of faster high-traffic roads. Studies in Delaware and Idaho have shown significant decreases in crashes at stop-controlled intersections.

== Legality by US state ==
"Red light as stop"

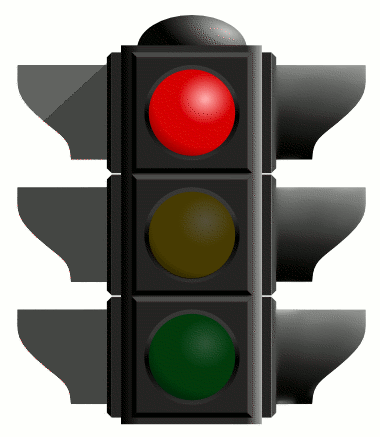
A red light...

...is treated like a stop sign.

"Stop as yield"

A stop sign...

...is treated like a yield sign.

| State | Stop-as-yield | Red-light-as-stop | Year passed |
|---|---|---|---|
| Idaho | Yes | Yes | 1982 |
| Delaware | Yes | No | 2017 |
| Arkansas | Yes | Yes | 2019 |
| Oregon | Yes | No | 2019 |
| Washington | Yes | No | 2020 |
| Utah | Yes | No | 2021 |
| North Dakota | Yes | No | 2021 |
| Oklahoma | Yes | Yes^{[a]} | 2021 |
| Colorado | Yes | Yes | 2022^{[b]} |
| Washington, DC | Yes | No^{[c]} | 2022 |
| Minnesota | Yes | No | 2023 |
| Alaska^{[d]} | Yes | Yes | 2023 |
| New Mexico | Yes | Yes | 2025 |
| South Carolina | Yes | Yes | 2026 |
| % of US population | 14% | 6.9% | |

1. ^{↑}Oklahoma allows bicyclists to make right turns on red without stopping, after yielding to any pedestrians and traffic that constitute an immediate hazard. Oklahoma's law also only permits cyclists to make left turns on red onto one-way streets.
2. ^{↑}In Colorado, the practice was legal in certain jurisdictions from 2011 to 2022.
3. ^{↑}DC law allows bicyclists to make a right turn after stopping at a red light. General red-light-as-stop movement is also allowed at specific intersections when signage allowing this is posted.
4. ^{↑}Only legal in Anchorage.

== History ==
The original Idaho yield law was introduced as Idaho HB 541 during a comprehensive revision of Idaho traffic laws in 1982. At the time, minor traffic offenses were criminal offenses and there was a desire to downgrade many of these to "civil public offenses" to free up docket time.

Carl Bianchi, then the Administrative Director of the courts in Idaho, saw an opportunity to attach a modernization of the bicycle law onto the larger revision of the traffic code. He drafted a new bicycle code that would more closely conform with the Uniform Vehicle Code, and included new provisions allowing bicyclists to take the lane, or to merge left, when appropriate. Addressing the concerns of the state's magistrates, who were concerned that "technical violations" of traffic control device laws by bicyclists were cluttering the court, the draft also contained a provision that allowed bicyclists to treat a stop sign as a yield sign—the so-called "rolling stop law". The new bicycle law passed in 1982, despite objections among some bicyclists and law enforcement officers.

In 2006, the law was modified to specify that bicyclists must stop at red lights and yield before proceeding straight through the intersection, and before turning left at an intersection. This had been the original intent, but Idaho law enforcement officials wanted it specified. The law originally passed with an education provision, but that was removed in 1988 because "youthful riders quickly adapted to the new system and had more respect for a law that legalized actual riding behavior".

In 2001, UC Berkeley physics professor Joel Fajans and magazine editor Melanie Curry published an essay entitled "Why Bicyclists Hate Stop Signs" on why rolling stops were better for bicyclists, generating greater interest in the Idaho law.

The first effort to enact the law outside of Idaho began in Oregon in 2003, when the Idaho law still only applied to stop signs. While a bill overwhelmingly passed in the House, it never made it out of the Senate Rules Committee. The Oregon effort in turn inspired an investigation of the law by the San Francisco Bay Area Metropolitan Transportation Commission in 2008. That investigation failed to spawn legislation, but did garner national attention, leading to similar efforts nationwide.

The term "Idaho Stop" came into popular use as a result of the California effort in 2008. Prior to that, it had been called "Idaho Style" or "Roll-and-go". "Idaho Stop" was popularized by bicycle blogger Richard Masoner in June 2008 coverage of the San Francisco proposal, but in reference to the "Idaho Stop Law"; the term had been used in discussion since at least the year prior. In August of the same year, the term—now in quotes—first showed up in print in a Christian Science Monitor article by Ben Arnoldy who referred to the "so-called 'Idaho stop' rule". Soon after, the term "Idaho stop" was commonly being used as a noun, not a modifier.

== Safety ==
A National Highway Traffic Safety Administration fact sheet published in March 2023 states that stop-as-yield and red-as-stop laws "showed added safety benefits for bicyclists in States where they were evaluated, and may positively affect the environment, traffic, and transportation". Acting Administrator Ann Carlson stated at a conference in October 2022 that "it increases [bicyclist] visibility to drivers and reduces their exposure. It also promotes safety in numbers by encouraging more people to bike, which reduces cyclists' overall risks.”

A 2010 study showed a 14.5% decrease in bicyclist injuries after the passage of the original Idaho Stop law, with the author concluding that "the decline in injuries is consistent with the strong indication that the law actually improves overall roadway safety". A Delaware state-run study of the "Delaware Yield" law (allowing bicyclists to treat stop signs as yield signs) concluded that it reduced injuries at stop-sign controlled intersections by 23%.

A study of rolling stops in Seattle determined that "results support the theoretical assertion that bicyclists are capable of making safe decisions regarding rolling stop", while a 2013 survey of stop-as-yield in Colorado localities where it is legal reported no increase in crashes. Another study done in Chicago showed that compliance with stop signs and stop lights by cyclists was low when cross-traffic was not present, but that most were still performing an Idaho Stop; and therefore "enforcing existing rules at these intersections would seem arbitrary and [capricious]".

== International approaches ==
Various approaches to stop-as-yield and red light-as-stop laws exist outside the United States.

Belgium

Belgian red-as-yield sign (B23)

Cyclists and speed pedelec riders in Belgium are allowed to cross red or amber traffic lights signposted with red-as-yield signs. There are two such signs in Belgium—B22 authorises cyclists to turn right (turn on red) while B23 authorises cyclists to continue straight when a light is red. In both cases, cyclists must give way to other road users (hence the red triangle priority sign).

B22 and B23 signs were first introduced in the Brussels-Capital region.

France

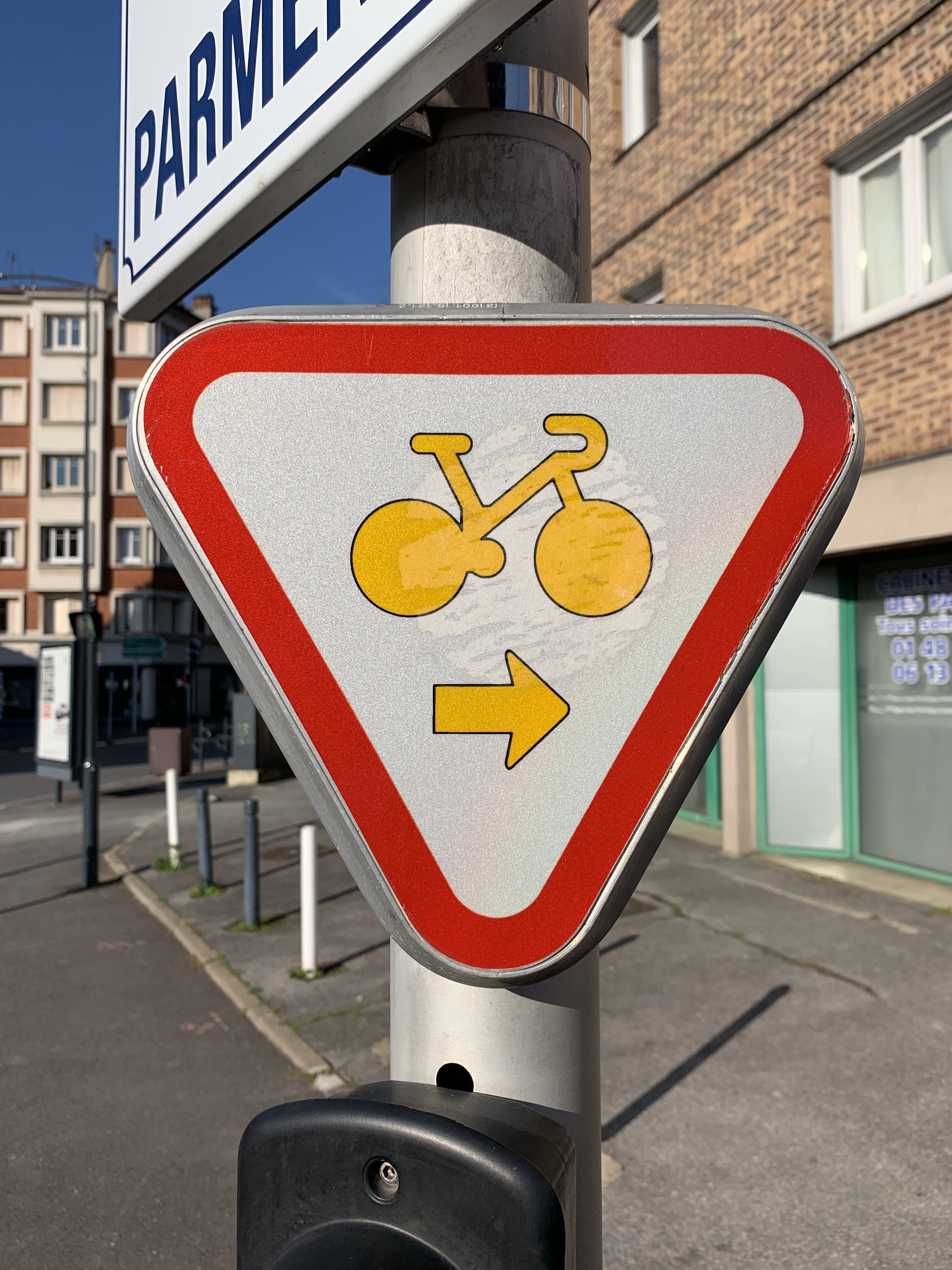
French red-as-yield sign (M12a) in Fontenay-sous-Bois

Cyclists in France are permitted to cross red lights at traffic lights signposted with red-as-yield M12 signs. Such signs only affect crossings were the cyclist is able to hug the pavement, i.e. going straight or turning right at T-junctions. Cyclists must yield to crossing traffic and pedestrians when crossing at red-as-yield signs.

Trials were first held in Bordeaux, Strasbourg, and Nantes, and later a 3-year trial in Paris beginning in 2012. Following the Parisian trial, French road laws were modified to legalise the system. Some 1,800 M12 signs were installed in Paris in 2015, and 1,153 have been installed in Lyon as of 2019.

== Legislative history ==
The "Idaho Stop" has been state policy there since 1982, with Idaho Transportation Department Bicycle/Pedestrian Coordinator Mark McNeese saying in 2015 that "Idaho [bicycle collision] statistics confirm that the Idaho law has resulted in no discernible increase in injuries or fatalities to bicyclists."

There was a resurgence of attempts to legalize stop-as-yield in other states in the 2000s. New Mexico attempted to enact a stop-as-yield / red-light-as-stop law in 2011; it made it through two senate committees, but failed in a close vote on the senate floor. After Oregon and San Francisco’s failed attempts to have similar bills passed, the Colorado cities of Dillon and Breckenridge passed stop-as-yield laws in 2011, the first localities in the country outside of Idaho. In 2012, Summit County passed a similar law for its unincorporated areas and in 2014, the City of Aspen passed one as well. In 2018, the state passed a law standardizing the language municipalities or counties could use to pass an Idaho Stop or stop-as-yield ordinance and preventing it from applying to any state highway system.

In 2017, 35 years after Idaho, Delaware became the second U.S. state to pass an Idaho Stop law. Delaware's law - known as the "Delaware Yield" - makes stop-as-yield legal, but only applies on roads with one or two travel lanes. Bicyclists must come to a complete stop at stop sign-controlled intersections with multi-lane roads.

In April 2019, Arkansas governor Asa Hutchinson signed the Arkansas "Idaho stop" law. On August 6, 2019, Oregon Governor Kate Brown signed stop-as-yield into law with an effective date of January 1, 2020. Washington State legalized stop-as-yield in October 2020. On March 18, 2021, Utah Governor Spencer Cox signed stop-as-yield into law for the state and on the next day, North Dakota Governor Doug Burgum signed a similar law for that state. On May 10, 2021, Oklahoma Governor Kevin Stitt signed House Bill 1770, which will allow bicyclists to treat stop signs as yield signs and stop lights as stop signs effective November 1, 2021. In April 2022, Colorado passed a law legalizing both stop-as-yield and red-as-stop statewide, overruling the previous patchwork of local laws.

In December 2022, Washington, DC, adopted the Safer Streets Amendment Act, which allows bicyclists to treat stop signs as yield signs. The act also allows bicyclists to turn right at a red light after stopping, which was banned for drivers at the same time. An earlier version of the bill included a general red-light-as-stop provision but it was replaced with a provision that would allow red-light-as-stop only at specific intersections with signage posted.

In May 2023, Minnesota passed a law that allowed bicyclists to treat a stop sign as a yield sign.

In March 2025, New Mexico passed Senate Bill 73, allowing cyclists to treat a stop sign as a yield sign and a red light as a stop sign. The law was signed by Governor Michelle Lujan Grisham on March 21, 2025, and went into effect on July 1, 2025.

South Carolina's stop-as-yield bill was signed into law on May 18, 2026. The nickname "Palmetto Stop" has been used by its proponents.

Idaho-stop-style bills, or resolutions asking the state to pass one, have been introduced but not yet passed in Arizona, Montana, New York City, Santa Fe, Edmonton, New Jersey, Virginia, Texas, and Georgia. In California, an Idaho Stop bill was vetoed in 2021 due to the governor’s concerns that the law would confuse children; in 2022, the legislature withdrew a bill legalizing the Idaho Stop for adults after the governor indicated it would be vetoed again. Another bill passed the California Assembly in May 2023.

== Positions ==
Advocates for Idaho stop laws argue that they improve safety. One study showed that Idaho has fewer severe crashes. Similarly, tests of a modified form of the Idaho Stop in Paris found that "allowing the cyclists to move more freely cut down the chances of collisions with cars, including accidents involving the car's blind spot". Some supporters maintain that changing the legal obligations of bicyclists provides direction to law enforcement to focus attention where it belongs—on unsafe bicyclists (and motorists). Additionally, some claim that, because bicycle laws should be designed to allow bicyclists to travel swiftly and easily, the Idaho stop provision allows for the conservation of energy.

Some opponents of the law maintain that a uniform, unambiguous set of laws that apply to all road users is easier for children to understand, and allowing bicyclists to behave by a separate set of rules than drivers makes them less predictable and thus, less safe. Jack Gillette, former president of the Boise Bicycle Commuters Association, argued that bicyclists should not have greater freedoms than drivers. "Bicyclists want the same rights as drivers, and maybe they should have the same duties", he said. San Francisco Mayor Edwin M. Lee argued without citing evidence that the law "directly endangers pedestrians and cyclists" in his veto of a similar law in the city.

== Related laws ==
Many US states have laws allowing bicyclists (and motorcyclists) to stop at and then proceed through a red light if the light doesn't change due to the inability of the embedded sensors in the ground to detect them. Such laws often require that the bicyclist stop, confirm that there is no oncoming traffic, and proceed after waiting a certain amount of time or cycles of the light. These are known as "Dead Red" laws.

Lane splitting, which allows people on bicycles and motorcycles to "filter" through stopped or slow-moving traffic, is legal in a handful of US states and in numerous other countries.

In countries that do not generally allow right turns on red, some allow right turns on red for bicyclists, either in general as in Belgium, or where specifically marked, such as Denmark, Germany and France.

In the Netherlands, a separate green phase called tegelijk groen allows bicycles to scramble before cars get a green light.
