= Tegelijk groen =

Dutch traffic rule

All directions green (bicycles)

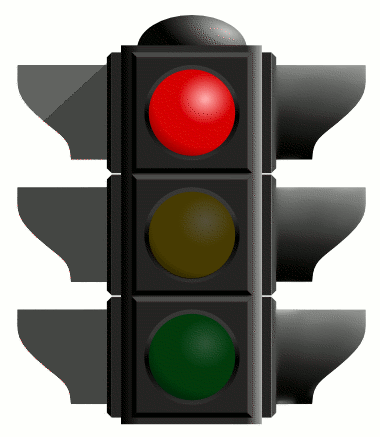
Cars wait...

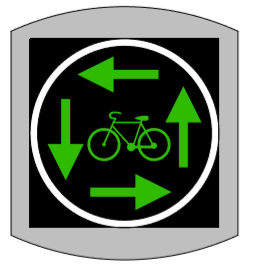
...while bicycles cross from all sides.

Tegelijk groen (Dutch pronunciation: [təɣəˌlɛik ˈxrun]; lit. 'simultaneously green'), commonly translated as all directions green and also known as a bike scramble, is a traffic rule in the Netherlands allowing bicycles to cross designated intersections at the same time from all sides. The all-cross phasing for bicycles was invented in Groningen in 1989. On the Groningen crossings where tegelijk groen was introduced, no more fatal accidents between bicycles and motorised traffic have occurred since. Cyclists must coordinate the crossing spontaneously, as no side has priority. Priority to the right does not hold, so in case of an accident, no cyclist can claim that the other took their right of way.

The rule will be introduced on intersections in Belgium under the name square green for cyclists (Dutch: vierkant groen; French: vert intégral; German: Quadratgrün) on 1 June 2027. The rule will also be rolled out for pedestrians, i.e., as a pedestrian scramble.

== See also ==
- stop-as-yield
