= Self-explaining road =

Design of roads to not rely on signage

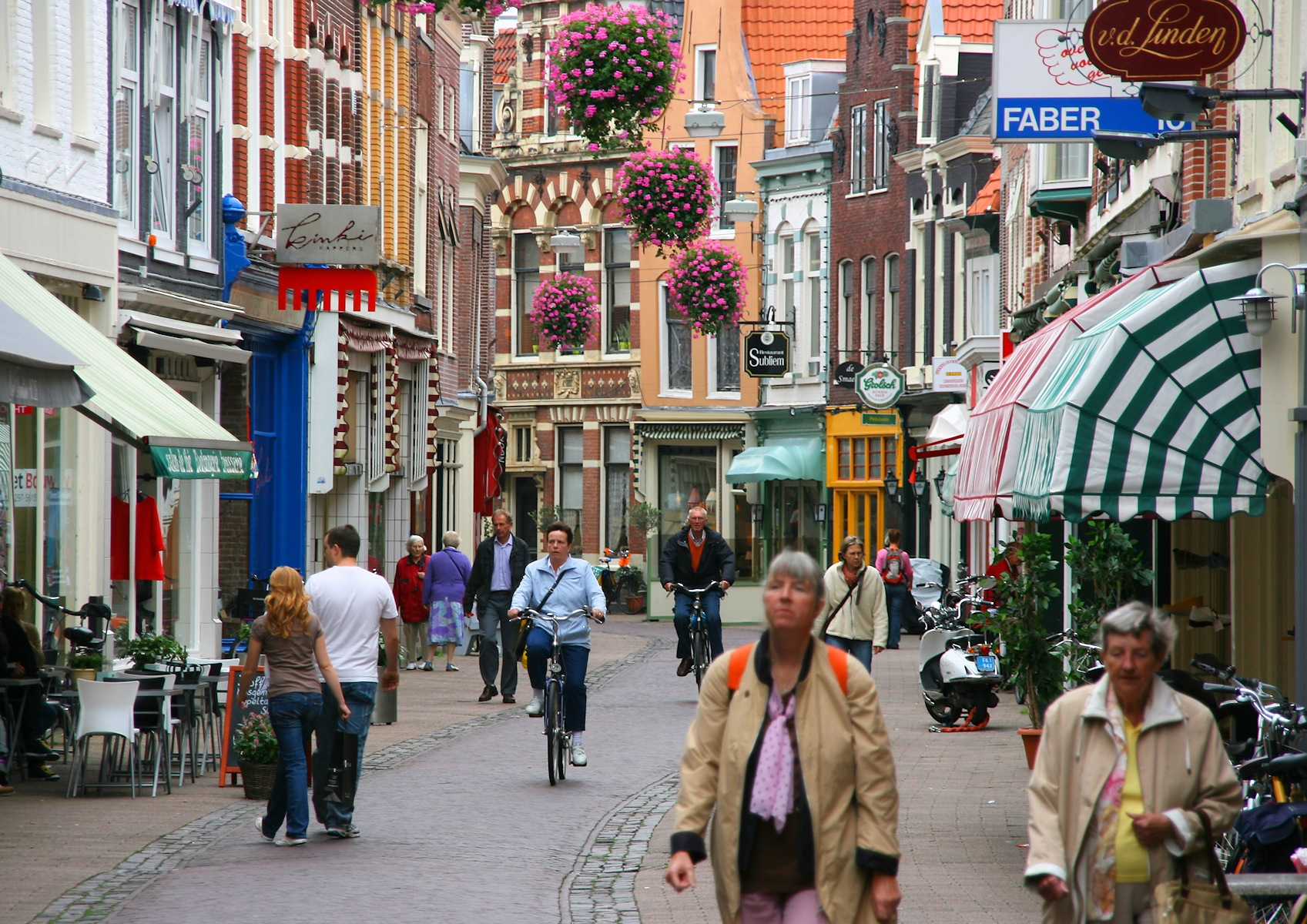
Dutch cities have been reducing street signage for decades. Urban design incorporates traffic calming measures that indicate the appropriate behavior to users of each mode of transport.

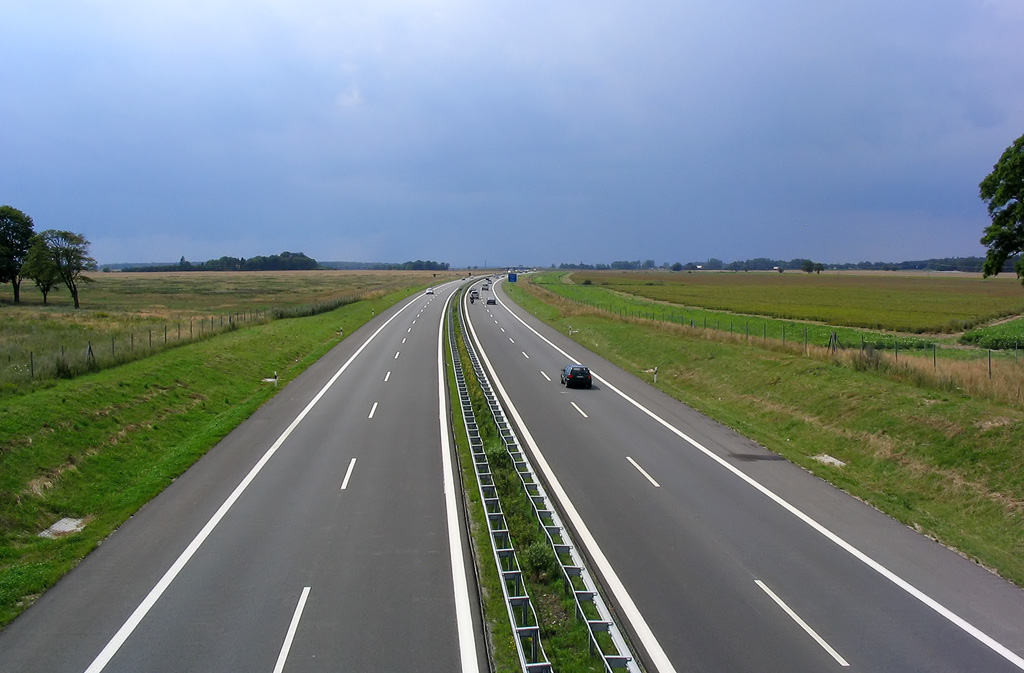
Many highways in Germany have no speed limits. The straight alignment of the road and the width of the lanes indicate that they are high-speed routes.

A self-explaining road or street is an urban design approach in which the physical configuration of the roadway allows drivers to intuitively understand how they should behave, without relying on signs or explicit rules. The goal is for elements such as lane width, road geometry, pavement or the visual environment to clearly convey the appropriate behavior, helping to prevent accidents.

This concept is based on principles of traffic psychology, according to which road users interpret their surroundings to make decisions while driving. When roads display visual characteristics that are consistent and differentiated according to their function, drivers learn to recognize them quickly and adjust their driving appropriately, without the need for explicit regulation.

== See also ==
- Naked street
- Traffic calming
- Nudge theory
