= Cyclability =

Degree of ease of cycling

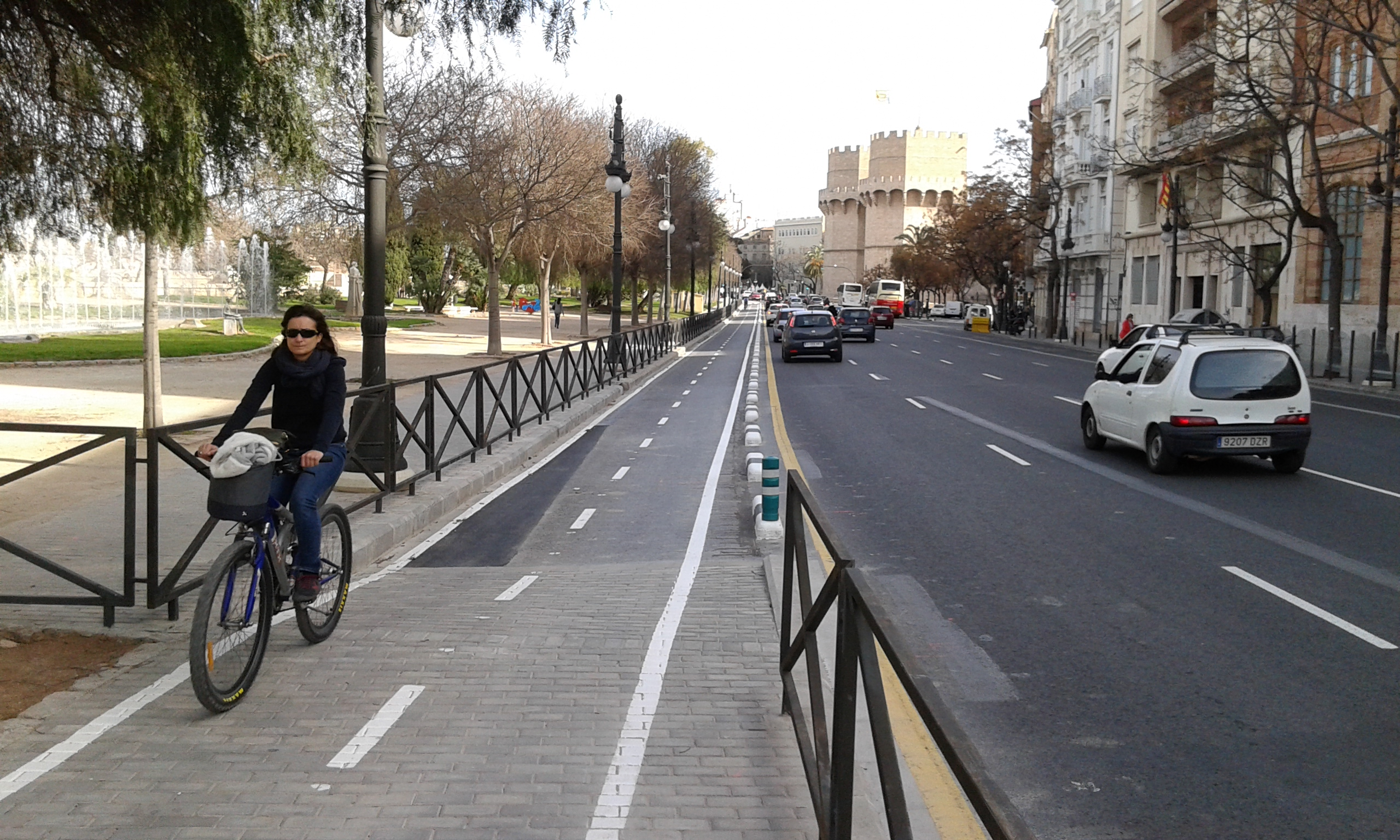
Segregated bike lane in Valencia, Spain

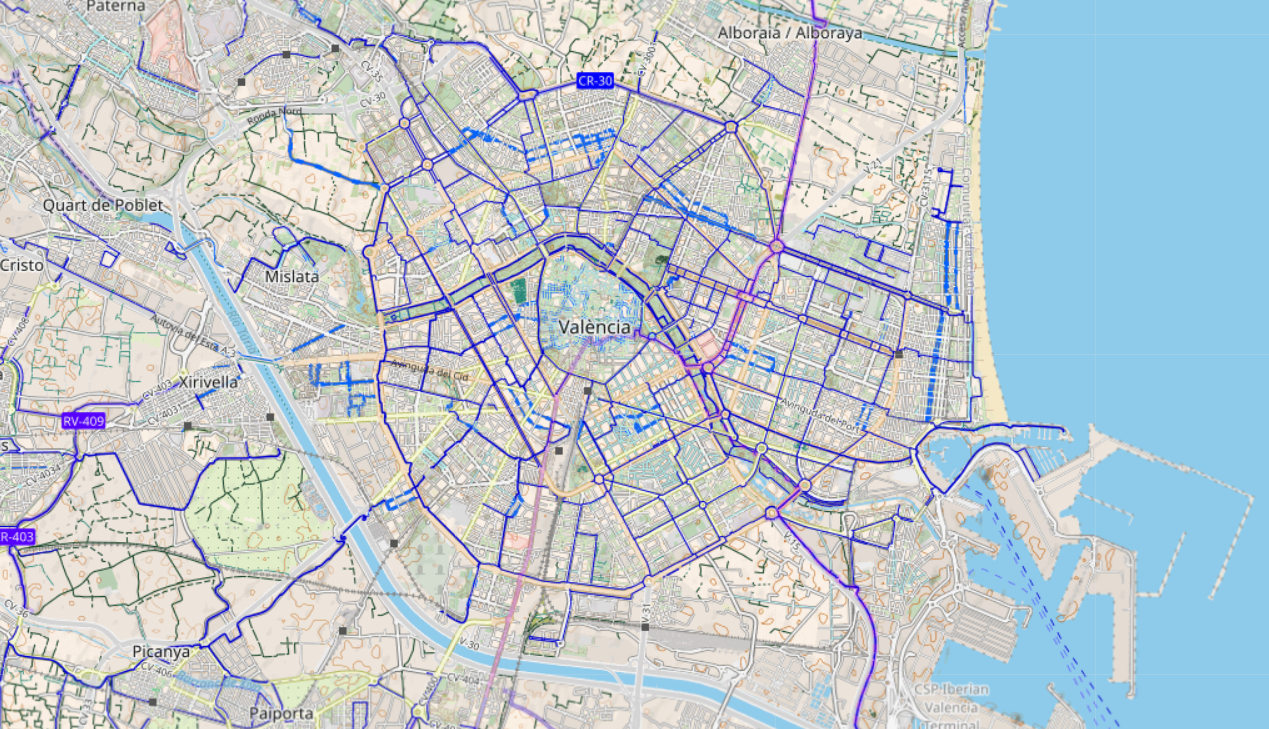
Map of the cycle lanes of Valencia (in blue)

The city of Valencia has increased its cyclability by extending and connecting its cycle paths with each other through segregated bike lanes. In just a few years, it has managed to increase both the number of users in general and the number of female cyclists in particular.

Cyclability is the degree of ease of bicycle circulation. A greater degree of cyclability in cities is related, among others, to benefits for people's health, lower levels of air and noise pollution, improved fluidity of traffic or increased productivity.

== Cyclability factors ==
Among the factors that affect cyclability are:

=== Safety ===
The safety of cycle paths is a requirement for high cyclability:

- The safest roads are those that are segregated from motorized traffic (bike lanes), followed by shared paths and, finally, lanes shared with other vehicles.
- The width of cycle paths should be wide enough for two bikes to cross or pass each other safely.
- The visibility of the road must make it possible to anticipate possible braking and intersections, avoiding curves at right angles.
- Intersections must, in turn, be well marked for both cyclists and motorized traffic.
- The routes must avoid obstacles, such as lampposts or benches. Also prevent carrying the bike, such as on stairs, in which case bicycle ramps can be incorporated.
- The pavement must be smooth, with lowered obstacles such as curbs, with materials that do not offer too much resistance, that drain and are not slippery when it rains.

=== Coherence ===
A coherent cycling network implies:

- The cycle paths must cover the entire extension of the city, so that the bicycle can be used to go to as many destinations as possible. Ideally, there should be a cycle path within 250 meters of any point in the city.
- They have to be connected to each other continuously.
- There must be secure bicycle parkings both at the origin and at the destination of the routes.
- The design of cycle paths must be uniform, so that all citizens can quickly perceive the use of that path, avoiding conflicts.
- The routes must be correctly signposted, including the destinations offered by each of the routes.

=== Directness ===
Bicycles are driven by people's physical exercise, therefore, a highly cyclable cycling network must allow direct movement without great effort:

- The routes between origins and destinations can be made in the most linear way possible, without the need to make large deviations.
- The cycle paths should go through the main streets, as they are usually the ones that host the majority of shops and services.
- They should avoid or minimize slopes.
- Reduce the number of stops such as traffic lights or intersections, which require greater physical effort. This may include stop-as-yield, dead red, or red-light-as-yield traffic laws.

== Cyclability indicators ==
One of the best indicators of the degree of cyclability is the balanced proportion of genders and ages that make daily use of the bicycle. Women, children and the elderly are the ones who have a greater perception of insecurity, so if a city has low cyclability, they will not consider the bicycle as a usual means of transport. On the contrary, a composition of bicycle users similar to the demographic structure will indicate a highly cyclable space.

== See also ==
- Active mobility
- Complete streets
- Cycling ecosystem
- Cycling infrastructure
- Human scale
- Intermodal passenger transport
- Non-motorist
- Last mile
- Permeability
- Right to mobility
- Road traffic safety
- Urban design
- Urban vitality
- Utility cycling
- Walkability
