= Right to mobility =

Right to move in a safe, accessible, equitable and sustainable manner

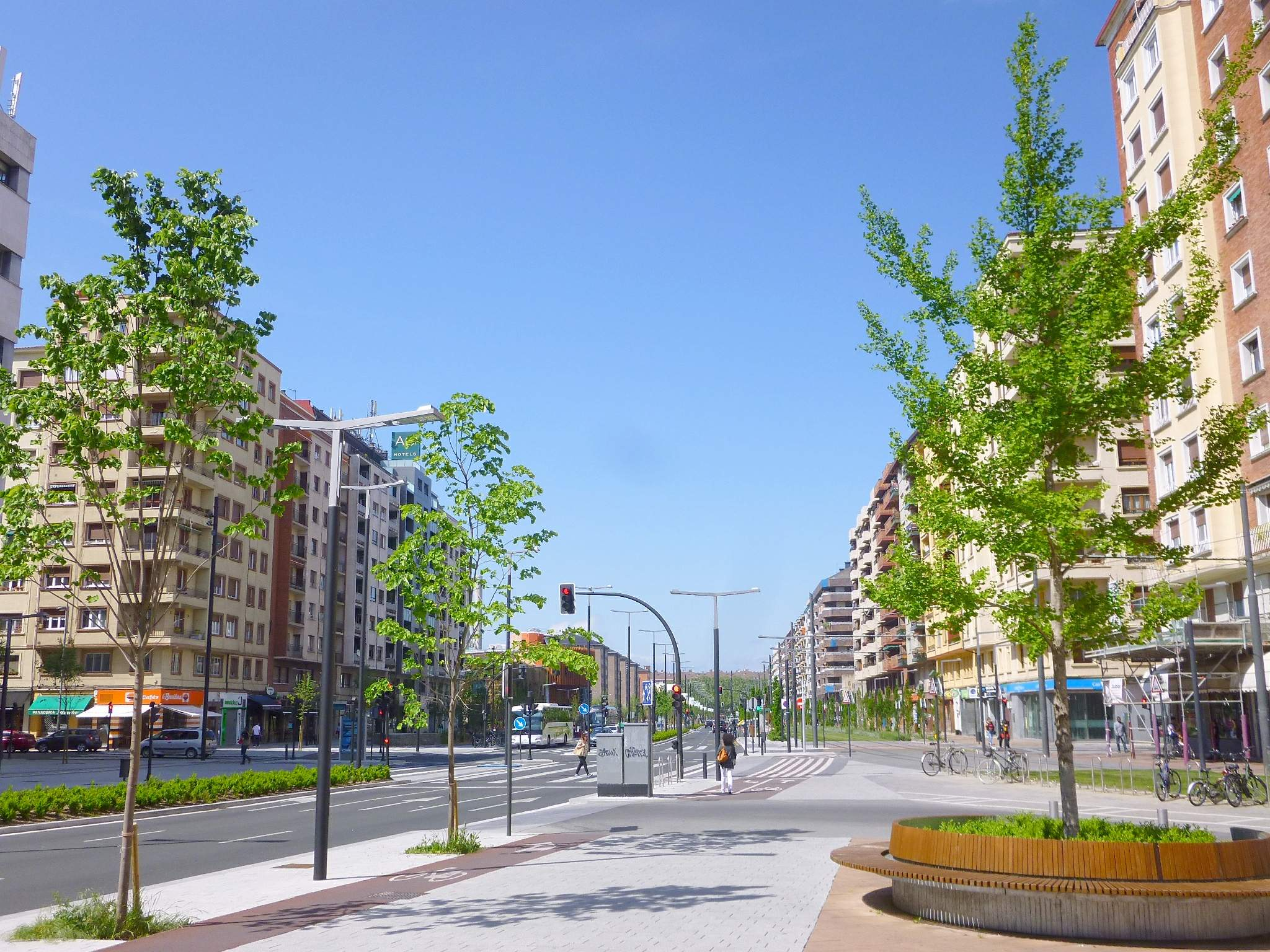
The redevelopment of streets that includes sidewalks with trees, user-friendly furniture, public drinking water fountains, segregated, linear, and interconnected bike lanes, and exclusive spaces for public transport is a concrete expression of the right to mobility in urban settings.

The right to mobility is a right that seeks to guarantee mobility for all people the i.e., the possibility to move freely, safely, accessibly, and sustainably, in order to meet their basic needs and exercise other fundamental rights, such as work, education, health, leisure, or social participation.

This right includes all forms of movement under conditions of equity and quality, such as walking, cycling, or access to public transportation, and not only the use of private motorized means of transport. It implies the obligation of State to design infrastructure and manage mobility systems that prioritize people over vehicles.

== Principles ==
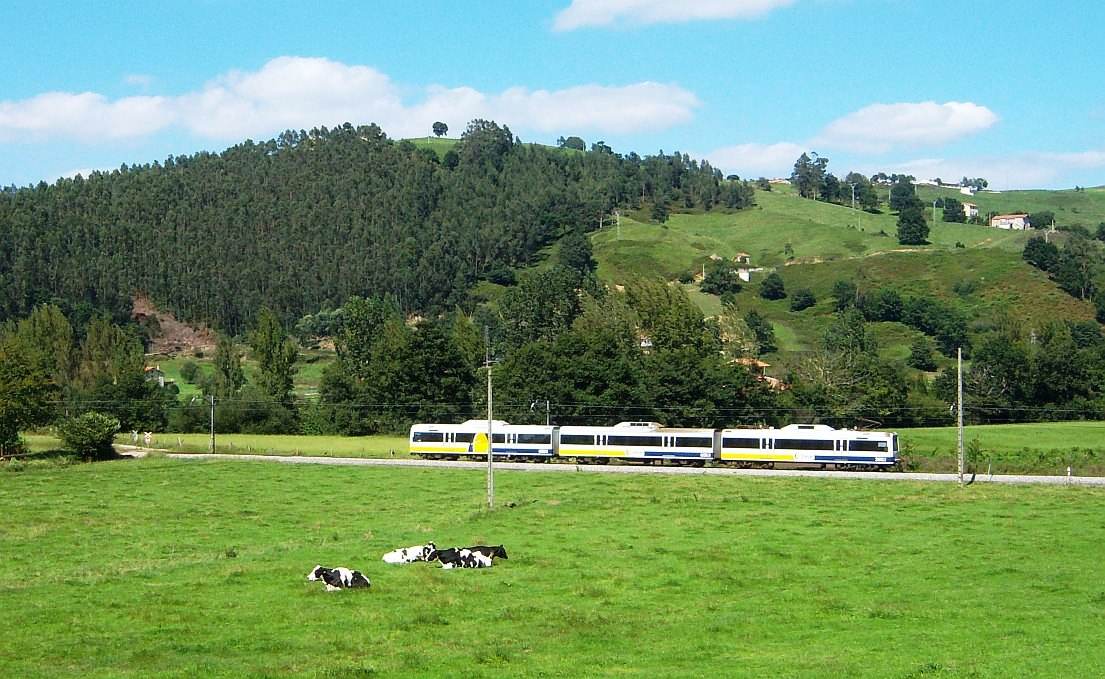
The development of public transport networks that cover the entire territory is a concrete expression of the right to mobility in interurban contexts.

The right to mobility is based on various principles:

- Universal accessibility, ensuring access to mobility for people with disabilities, children, and the elderly.
- Road safety, aimed at accident prevention and the protection of life.
- Equity, ensuring fair conditions for all users of public space.
- Sustainability, promoting modes of transport with low environmental impact.
- Health, encouraging active mobility and non-polluting means of transport.
- Efficiency, to reduce travel times and costs, as well as lower demands on public space.

== See also ==
- Accessibility
- Accessibility (transport)
- Curb cut effect
- Cyclability
- Freedom of movement
- Green transport hierarchy
- Inclusive design
- Mobility transition
- Night service (public transport)
- Public transport accessibility level
- Right to the city
- Sustainable urban infrastructure
- Sustainable urbanism
- Transport divide
- Universal design
- Urban vitality
- Walkability
- Walking audit
