= Urban vitality =

Intensity of use of an urban area

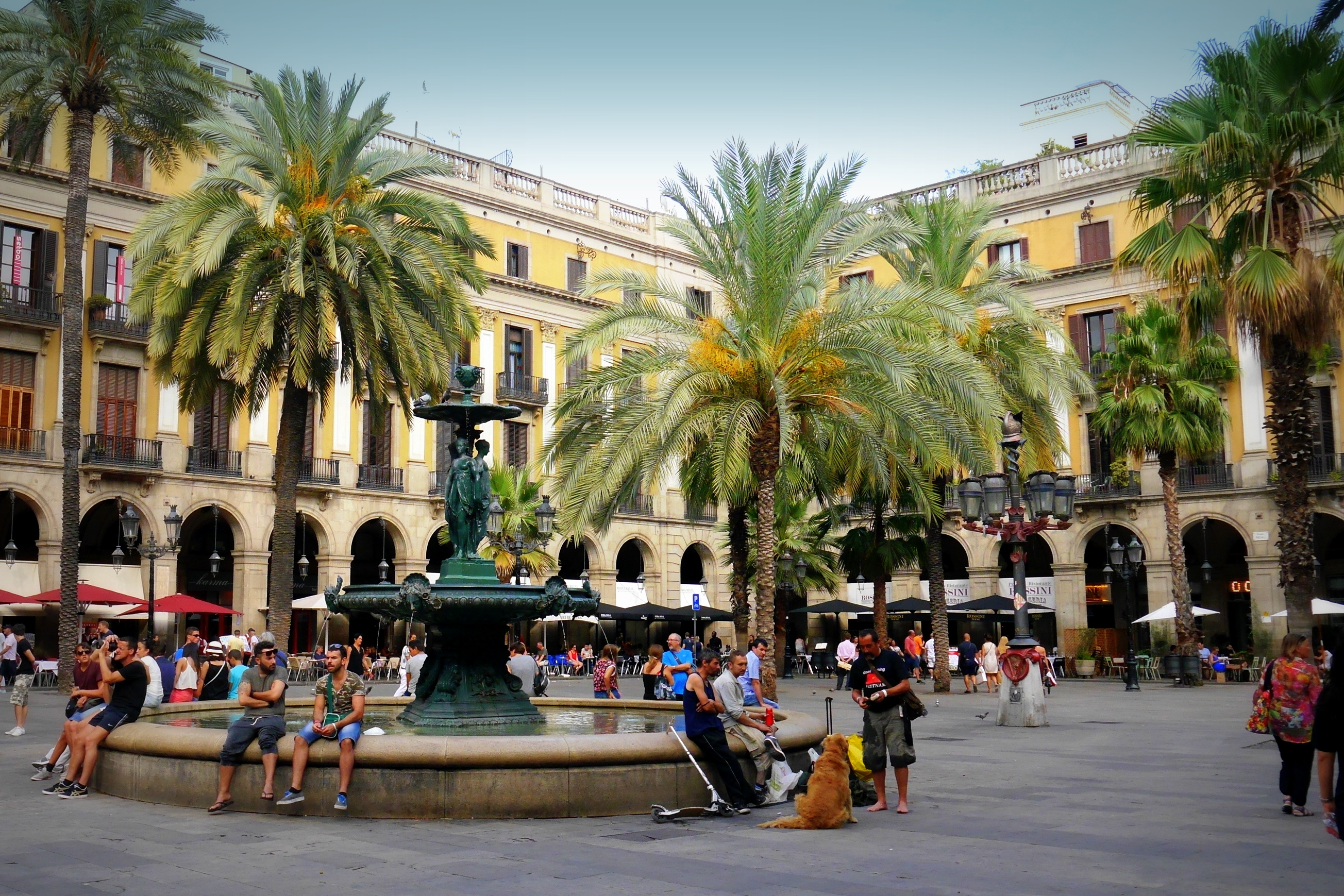
The Plaça Reial of Barcelona has a high vitality, with pedestrian spaces and a variety of establishments in its vicinity.

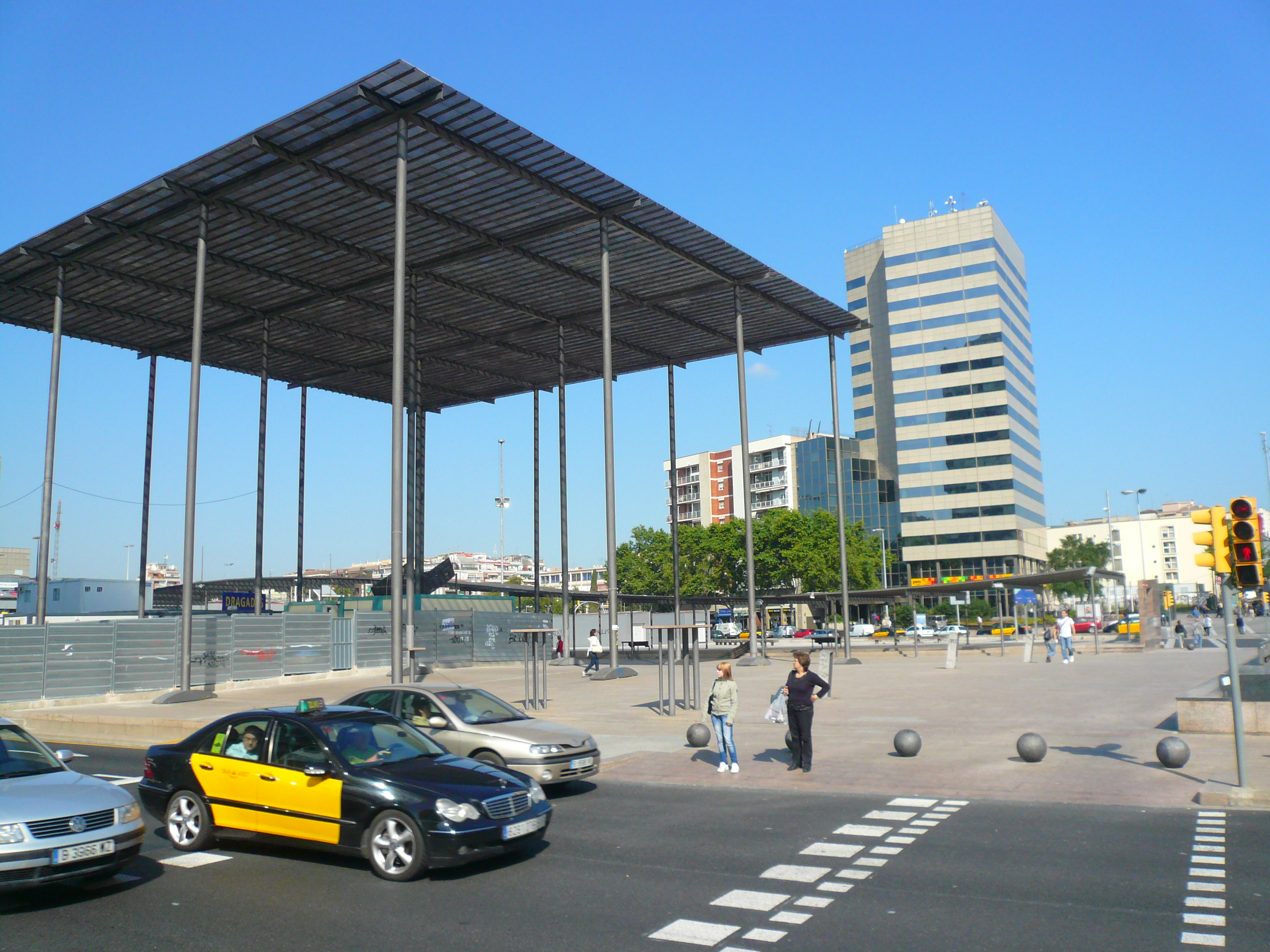
Comparatively, Plaça dels Països Catalans has a low vitality, with fewer establishments and large, surrounding streets which inhibit pedestrian movement.

Urban vitality is the quality of spaces in cities that attract diverse groups of people for a range of activities at different times of the day. Such spaces are often perceived as being alive, lively, or vibrant, in contrast with low-vitality areas, which may repel people and be perceived as unsafe.

The urban vitality index is a measure of this quality and has become a fundamental tool in urban planning, especially in interventions for spaces with low vitality. The index is also used to assist the management of spaces that already have high vitality. However, the success of high-vitality spaces can sometimes lead to gentrification and overtourism that may reduce their vitality and initial popularity.

The concept of urban vitality is based on the works of Jane Jacobs, especially her most influential work, The Death and Life of Great American Cities. In the 1960s, Jacobs criticized the modern and rationalist architecture of Robert Moses and Le Corbusier, whose work centered on private cars. She argued that these forms of urban planning overlooked and oversimplified the complexity of human life in diverse communities. She opposed large-scale urban renewal programs that affected neighborhoods and that built freeways through inner cities. Instead, she advocated for compact and mixed-use development, characterized by walkable streets and "eyes on the street" to deter crime.

The concept of urban vitality is important in Mediterranean urbanism and its history, in which public space, walkability and squares are valued as centers of social interaction and cohesion, in contrast to Anglo-Saxon urbanism of large, car-centric infrastructures with greater distances between conveniences.

== Conditions for high urban vitality ==
Urban vitality can be quantified thanks to the analysis of the elements that determine it. Among them are:

- Diversity of uses of the space: the presence of different functions that can attract different types of people for various activities at different times, making the space constantly occupied and improving its safety;
- Opportunities for personal contact: blocks, undersized buildings and open spaces, as they reduce the number of possible intersections and social interactions;
- Building diversity: buildings with different characteristics and ages, allowing people with different purchasing power to live in all areas of the city, avoiding the formation of ghettos;
- High urban density: concentration of inhabitants, economic activities, services and urban functions that creates critical mass for vitality. It is not just a question of residential density, but of overall urban intensity that allows different forms of urban life to overlap and interact;
- Universal accessibility: accessibility for all people without reliance on private transport, with pedestrian access as a priority being the most democratic, sustainable and economical, followed by bicycle access and public transport;
- Distance from barrier elements: distance from border elements such as large buildings, ring roads, surface railway lines or large urban parks that discourage road use;
- Quality of public spaces: presence of public spaces that are well designed, maintained and equipped to support various social and recreational activities. Spaces should be comfortable, accessible and provide opportunities for spontaneous socialising and community activities;
- Presence of essential services: availability of essential public and private services such as schools, health facilities, post offices, banks and other services that act as catalysts for urban activity and create natural gathering points during different times of the day;
- Perceived and actual security: security conditions that go beyond simple natural surveillance resulting from diversity of use. Includes adequate lighting, visibility of spaces, presence of natural social control activities and absence of elements that generate insecurity;
- Metropolitan connectivity: efficient connections to the rest of the city through integrated transport networks that enable inhabitants and visitors to easily reach other urban areas, while keeping the vital area embedded in the wider urban system;
- Economic resilience: presence of a diverse and resilient local economy, able to adapt to economic changes without losing vitality. Includes mix of economic activities, presence of small local businesses and capacity for innovation and adaptation;
- Sustainability and environmental quality: environmental conditions that support long-term viability, including the presence of urban green spaces, air quality, noise control, sustainable resource management and adaptation to climate change.

== See also ==
- 15-minute city
- Accessibility
- Complete street
- Curb cut effect
- Cyclability
- Feminist urbanism
- Green infrastructure
- Green urbanism
- Human ecology
- Human geography
- Human scale
- Inclusive design
- Linear park
- Naked street
- New Urbanism
- Public toilet
- Right to mobility
- Sustainable urbanism
- Sustainable urban infrastructure
- Tactical urbanism
- Third place
- Universal design
- Urban decay
- Urban design
- Urban ecology
- Urban geography
- Walkability
