= Non-detection at traffic lights in the United States =

Detection of small vehicles at intersections

In order to improve intersection capacity in the United States, intelligent transport systems such as vehicle detection have been introduced at intersections controlled by traffic lights. However, these lights sometimes do not detect smaller vehicles such as bikes or motorcycles.

Traffic lights that do not service traffic due to non-detection may not meet the federal legal definition adopted by most states for a traffic control signal, which is any device "by which traffic is alternately directed to stop and permitted to proceed". Meeting this definition is required for any citation to be upheld; traffic signals that fail to meet it may be considered "defective" or "inoperative."

Some jurisdictions require operators to "bring the vehicle to a complete stop before entering the intersection and may proceed with caution only when it is safe to do so".

== Background ==
In some instances, small vehicles such as motorcycles, scooters, and bicycles may not be detected, leaving the traffic light controller unaware of their presence. When this occurs, the small vehicle may fail to receive the right of way when the traffic light controller skips their phase, such as at traffic lights that are programmed to remain green for the main street and to only service minor movements, such as the side street or a main street left turn lane, on an as-needed basis when there is demand.

For example, small vehicles may not be detected by an induction loop sensor, such as one whose sensitivity has been set too low in an attempt to avoid false triggers. While a typical motor vehicle has a sufficient mass of metal such as steel that interacts with the sensor's magnetic field, motorcycles and scooters have much less mass than cars, and bicycles may not even be constructed with metal. This situation most often occurs at the times of day when other traffic is sparse as well as when the small vehicle is coming from a direction that does not have a high volume of traffic.

== Laws by state ==
Twenty-one states in the United States have enacted "dead red" laws that give motorcyclists and sometimes bicyclists an affirmative defense to proceed through a red light with caution after stopping when they are not detected by the traffic light controller.

- Arkansas 27-52-206
- Colorado 42-4-612
- Idaho 49-802 (3)(a)
- Illinois 11-306 (c)(3.5)
- Indiana 9-21-3-7 (b)(3)(D)
- Kansas 8-1508 (c)(4)
- Kentucky 189-338 (6)
- Minnesota 169.06 Subd. 9
- Missouri 304.285
- Nevada 484B.307 (8)(d)
- North Carolina 20-158 (e)
- Ohio 4511.132 (A)
- Oklahoma 47-11-202 (3)(d)
- Oregon (2)(a)
- Pennsylvania (allows any vehicle to observe "ride on red") 75-3112 (c)(2)
- South Carolina 56-5-970 (5)
- Tennessee 55-8-110 (b)
- Utah 41.6a.305 (7)
- Virginia 46.2-833 (B)
- Washington 46.61.184
- Wisconsin 346.37 (1)(c)(4)
- Pending Legislation: Massachusetts MA H.3182
- Failed: Alabama HB103
- Failed: Nebraska LB 85
- Failed: New Jersey NJ A 3624
- Failed: Wyoming HB0092
