= Road diet =

Transportation planning technique

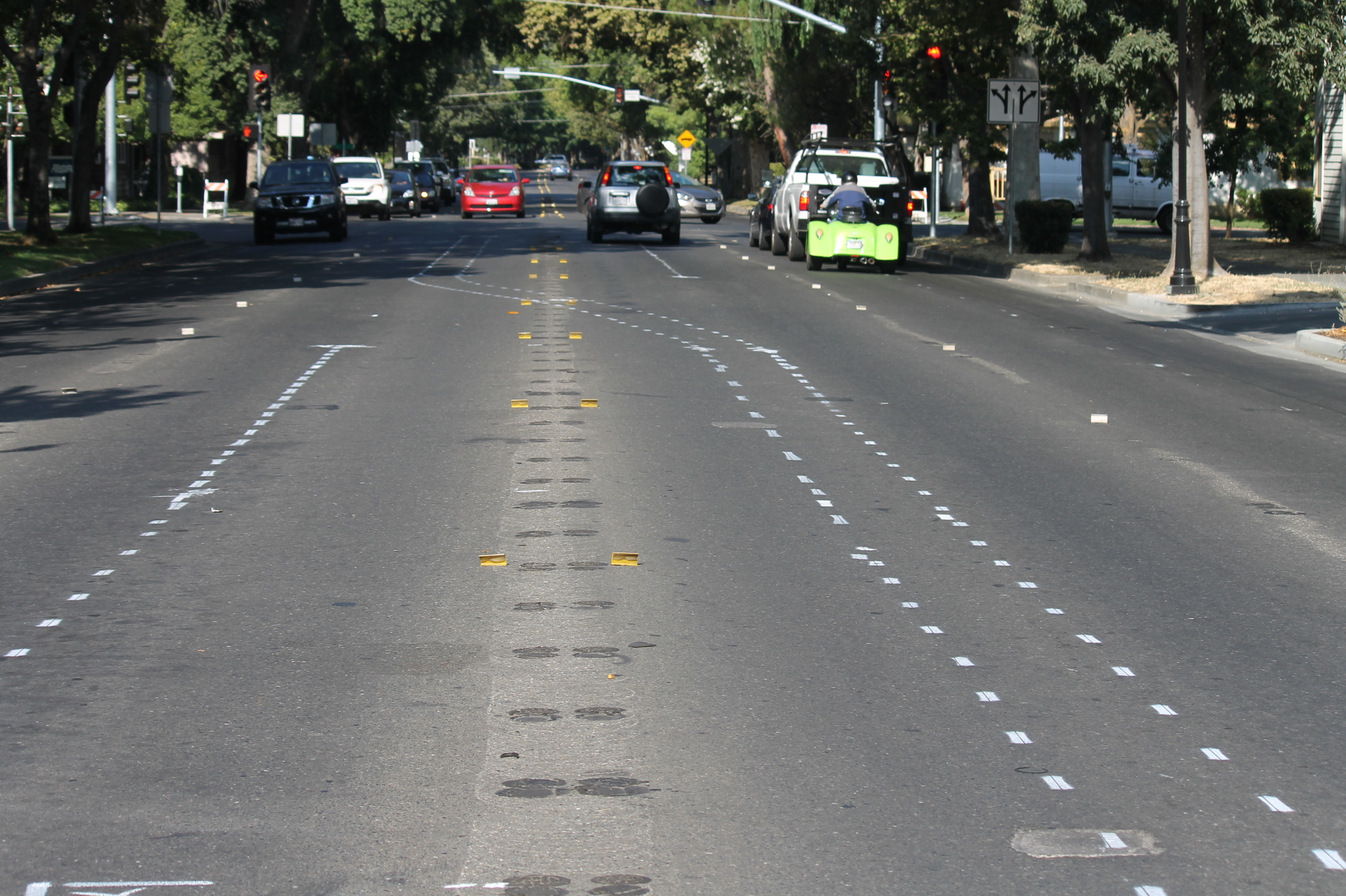
A road in Davis, California, with four lanes curb to curb

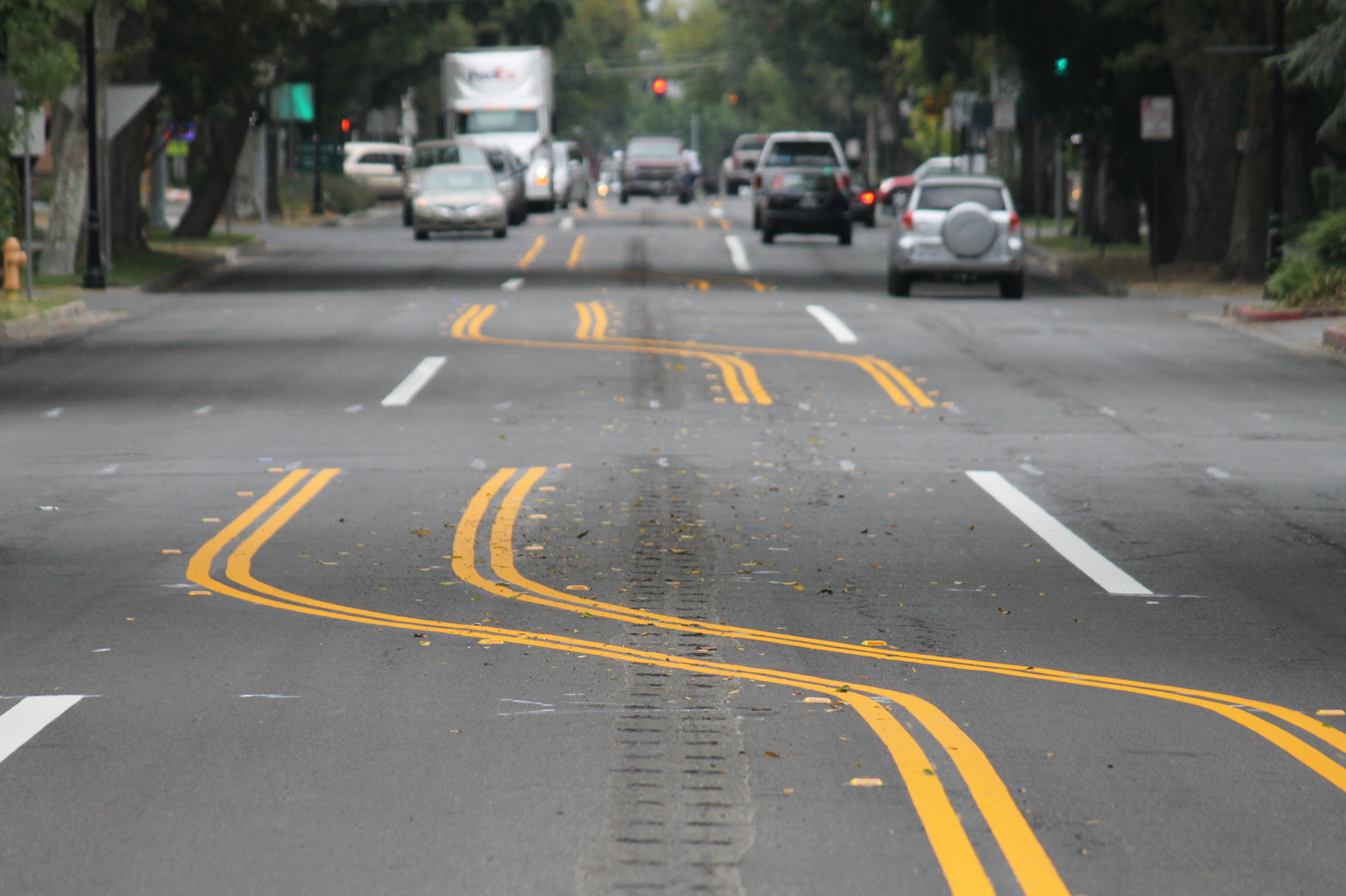
The same road repainted after a road diet, with two through lanes plus bike lanes and a central left-turn lane

A road diet (also called a lane reduction, road rechannelization or road conversion) is a technique in transportation planning whereby the number and/or the width of travel lanes of the road is reduced, often to achieve a reduction in crash rates.

== Techniques ==
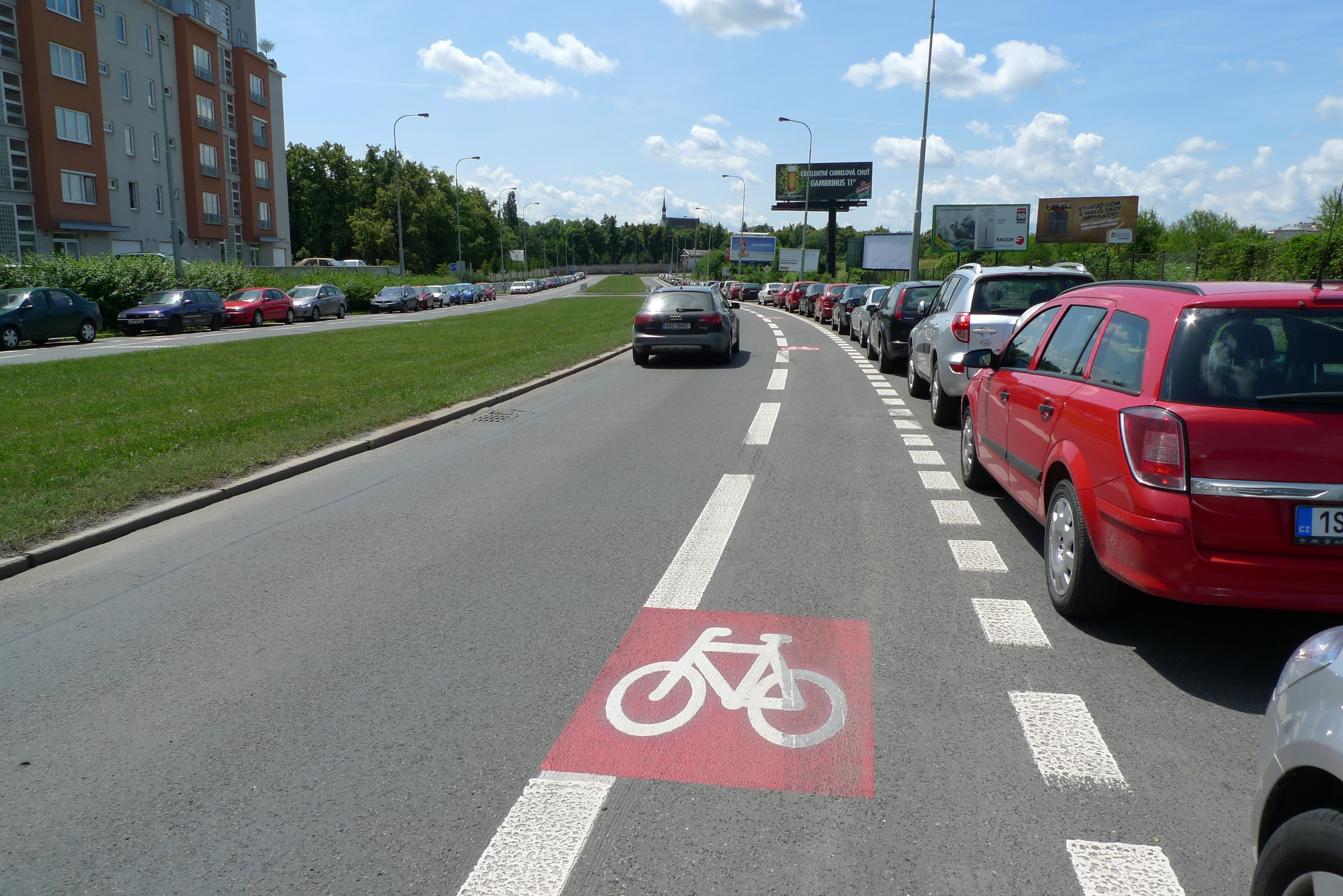
Počernická Street in Prague used to be four lanes wide. In the 2010s, it got parking lanes and bicycle lanes on each side of the road

=== Reducing the number of lanes ===
Reducing the number of lanes on a roadway cross-section is a typical road diet technique. One of the most common applications of a road diet is to improve safety or provide space for other modes of travel. For example, a two-way, four lane road might be reduced to one travel lane in each direction. If properly designed, traffic does not divert to other streets after a road diet, because the road previously provided excessive capacity. In other scenarios, reduction of traffic (either local traffic or overall traffic) is intended in the scheme. Road diets are usually successful on roads carrying fewer than 19,000 vehicles per day. Road diets can succeed at volumes up to about 23,000 vehicles per day, but more extensive reconstruction is needed. Examples include replacing signals with roundabouts, traffic calming on parallel streets to discourage traffic from diverting away from the main road, and other means to keep traffic moving smoothly and uniformly.

=== Reducing the width of lanes ===
In a lane diet, the width of a car lane is decreased to reduce vehicle speeds and accidents and provide space for other use. Typically vehicular travel lane widths are narrowed to no more than 2.8 metres (9.1 ft), and left turn (in countries where cars travel on the right-hand side of the road) storage lanes between 2.7 and 3.0 metres (9 and 10 ft). The resulting extra non-car space can be used for pedestrian zones or refuges, medians, sidewalks, shoulders, parking, or bike lanes.

=== Uses of the freed-up space ===
After reducing the number and/or the width of lanes, the freed-up space is used to provide or enhance some of the following features:

- Adding or widening of footpaths / sidewalks
- Adding or widening of boulevards (landscaping strips)
- Adding cycle lanes on one or both sides of the road
- Adding reserved tram tracks, usually in the middle of the road
- Widening remaining traffic lanes (if previously unsafely narrow to allow four lanes)
- Adding a center turn lane / flush traffic median for turning traffic
- Adding a reversible center lane
- Conversion of the rightmost or leftmost travel lane to a breakdown lane (The Lodge Freeway in metro Detroit is an example of this after I-96, the Jeffries Freeway, was built.)

== Impacts ==
=== Road diets can reduce crash frequency ===
Researchers and the U.S. Department of Transportation (Federal Highway Administration) have found that road diets, when properly implemented, can be expected to reduce overall crash frequency 19-47% with the higher crash reductions occurring in small urban areas than in metropolitan areas.

Many of the roads in the Iowa study were changed to 3 lanes after highways were built around the cities or towns. This bypass and change of traffic was not addressed in the study. Thus the claim of a 47% crash reduction could be misleading or invalid. Further investigation into the study’s methodology and transparency is needed to determine the credibility of its findings.

=== Not reducing traffic volumes ===
Additional studies have shown that road diets often achieve these positive effects without reducing traffic volumes.

A 2004 study by the Federal Highway Administration found that properly installed road diets decreased the risk of collisions and serious injury. When average daily traffic exceeds 20,000 vehicles a day, however, this increase in safety comes with the tradeoff of increased congestion and the possibility of diverting traffic to alternate routes. Incorrectly installed road diets may not see any improvements and there may be negative impacts due to the lane reconfiguration.

=== Possible effect on evacuation speed during wildfires ===
After the 2018 Camp Fire, the Los Angeles Times noted that a previously four lane road through the downtown area of the remote California mountain town of Paradise had been converted to one lane in each direction in order to increase pedestrian safety and friendliness for shopping, and questioned whether this added to the gridlock during evacuation. Paradise's mayor Jody Jones stated “I don’t believe that it really mattered,” [the changes made on Skyway]. “I don’t think there’s any town in the world prepared with a roadway infrastructure that could evacuate their entire town all at once. They’re just not built to do that.”

=== Emergency response time ===
The Iowa Department of Transportation, along with the CDC funded a study to change the perception of emergency response time in relation to road diets. The study looked at a single road dieted arterial in Cedar Rapids, Iowa and found no material improvement or reduction in response times. The study also asked responders from all over the state and it found that 41% of responders said that road diets had a negative impact on response time.

== Implementation examples by country ==
=== South Korea ===
In the centre of Sinchon-dong, Seoul, (South Korea), a road diet has been achieved in 2014. After 6 months, traffic congestion eased substantially, leading to a reduction of accidents by 34% from the previous year. In a survey, visitor satisfaction in 2014 was at 70% (compared to 14% in 2013). Business boomed for shops with shoppers rising by 28.9% in 2014 (compared to 2013).

=== United Kingdom ===
During the COVID-19 pandemic London implemented a number of road diets to give more space to active travel modes such as bicycle lanes, on a number of its roads. For example, the formerly three-lane northbound carriageway of Park Lane was reduced to one lane for motor traffic, one bus lane and one segregated cycle way.

=== United States ===
Among American cities San Francisco has completed the most road diet projects, over 40 since the late 1970s. Valencia Street, which was reduced from four to two travel lanes with a center turn lane and bike lanes added in March 1999, has become a national model for traffic engineers of the common "4-to-3 lane" road diet type.

San Jose, California has implemented several road diets since November 2011, when the City Council unanimously adopted its "Envision 2040" General Plan, which calls for road diets on streets with excess vehicle capacity "to provide wider sidewalks, bicycle lanes, transit amenities, and/or landscaping". Road diets were completed on 3rd, 4th, 10th, and 11th streets in August 2012, and on Hedding Street in July 2013.

Constricting traffic arteries has been controversial in Los Angeles, California, where traffic fatalities increased 32% since beginning its Vision Zero road diet plan in 2015.

Palo Alto, California has studied reducing the number of travel lanes to improve safety on some of its busiest streets since adopting a new Comprehensive Plan in 1998. Design plans were made for road diets on Embarcadero Road and Middlefield Road in the early 2000s, but were never brought to the city council for approval. 75-yr-old local resident Ming Yuan Zuo was killed by a pickup truck driver while walking across Embarcadero Road in January 2013. Lane reductions were approved and then implemented on Charleston Road in 2006, Arastradero Road in 2010, and Deer Creek Road in 2011.

In Tampa, Florida, Nebraska Avenue between its intersection with Hillsborough Avenue (US 92-US 41-FL 600) and Adamo Drive was reduced from four to three lanes, complete with bicycle lanes, a left turn lane and embedded bus stops for HART buses. Construction was completed in 2009.

In Rutland, Vermont, the city briefly converted Woodstock Avenue from a four-lane road to a three-lane road with bicycle lanes on each side. However, due mainly to opposition from businesses alongside the road in June 2014, Woodstock Avenue was returned to its previous four-lane configuration.

In Waverly, Iowa the city converted Bremer Avenue from a four-lane road to a three-lane road with a safety buffer on each side. This conversion was done in 2018. According to Iowa DOT Crash Data and Iowa DOT AADT there was a 41% reduction in traffic on Bremer Avenue. Waverly did not see a crash reduction on Bremer Avenue. From (2014-2017) Bremer Avenue had 60 crashes under the 4 lane configuration, and that actually increased 5% to 63 crashes from (2021-2024). The majority of traffic from Bremer Avenue was diverted to 10th Avenue and Cedar River Parkway and crashes on those arterials went from 16 (2014-2017) to 75 (2021-2024), a 368% crash increase on the arterials where traffic was diverted to. During this time crashes city wide went down 16% The city faced criticism due to volunteer firefighter who must use their personal vehicles to get to the fire station and must use Bremer Avenue to get there thus slowing emergency response time.

== See also ==
- Reversible lane
- Contraflow lane reversal
- 2+1 road
- Street hierarchy
- Tactical urbanism – Low-cost, temporary improvement to a city
- Transit mall – Urban street reserved for public transit, bicycles, and pedestrians
- Freeway removal – Replacement of motorways with pedestrian-friendly and urbanist land uses
- Street reclamation – Changing streets to focus on non-car use
- Unused highway – Roads that were closed or never used
