= Bicycle-friendly =

Urban planning prioritising cycling

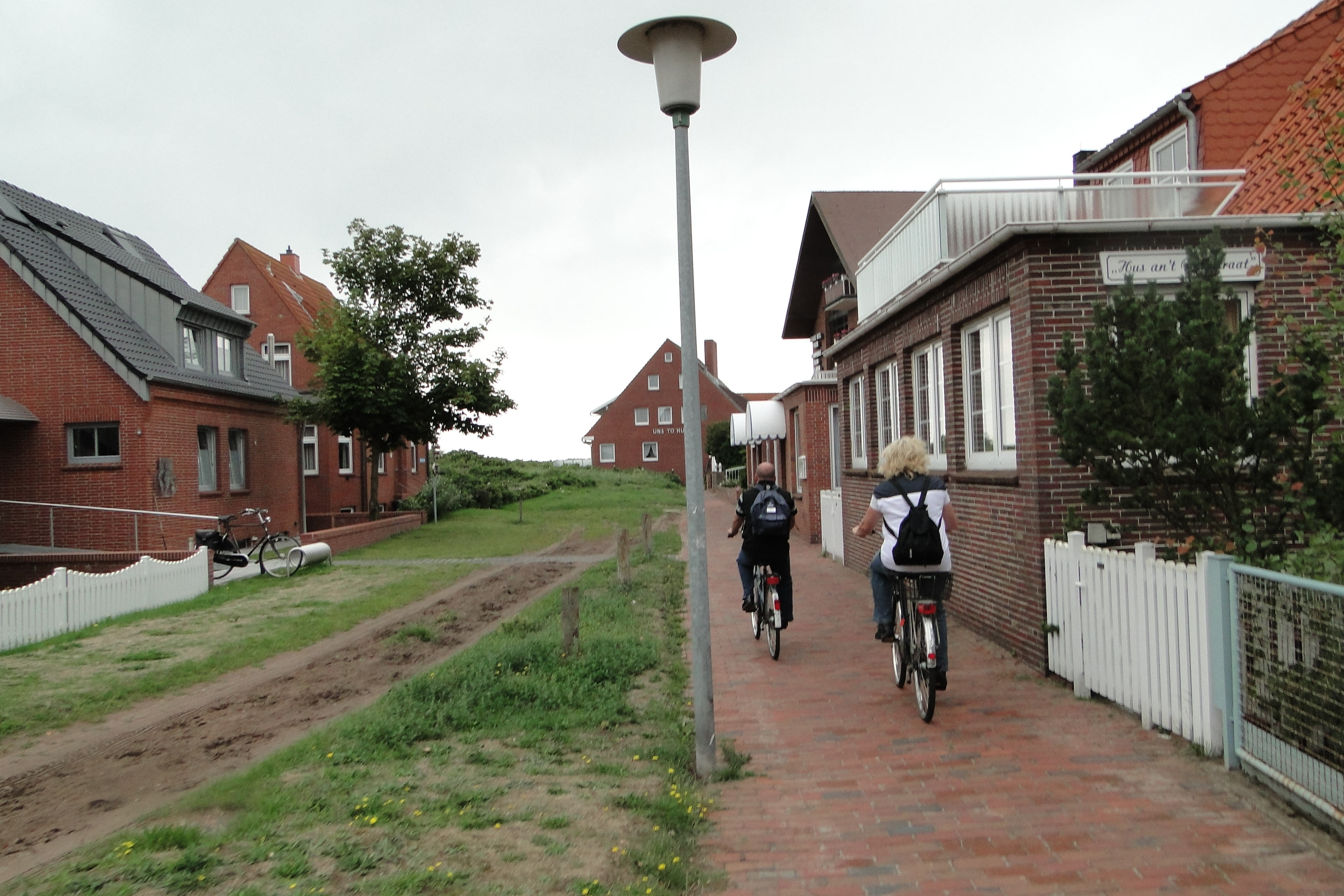
Carfree Juist, Germany

Bicycle-friendly policies and practices help some people feel more comfortable about traveling by bicycle with other traffic. The level of bicycle-friendliness of an environment can be influenced by many factors including town planning and cycling infrastructure decisions. A stigma towards people who ride bicycles and fear of cycling is a social construct that needs to be fully understood when promoting a bicycle friendly culture.

== Urban planning ==
Assuming people prefer to get to their destination quickly, urban planning and zoning may affect whether schools, shops, public transport interchanges and other destination are within a reasonable cycling distance of the areas where people live. If urban form influences these issues, then compact and circular settlement patterns may promote cycling. In 1990, the Netherlands adopted the "ABC" guidelines, specifically limiting infrastructure developments that are major attractants to locations that are readily accessible by non-car users.

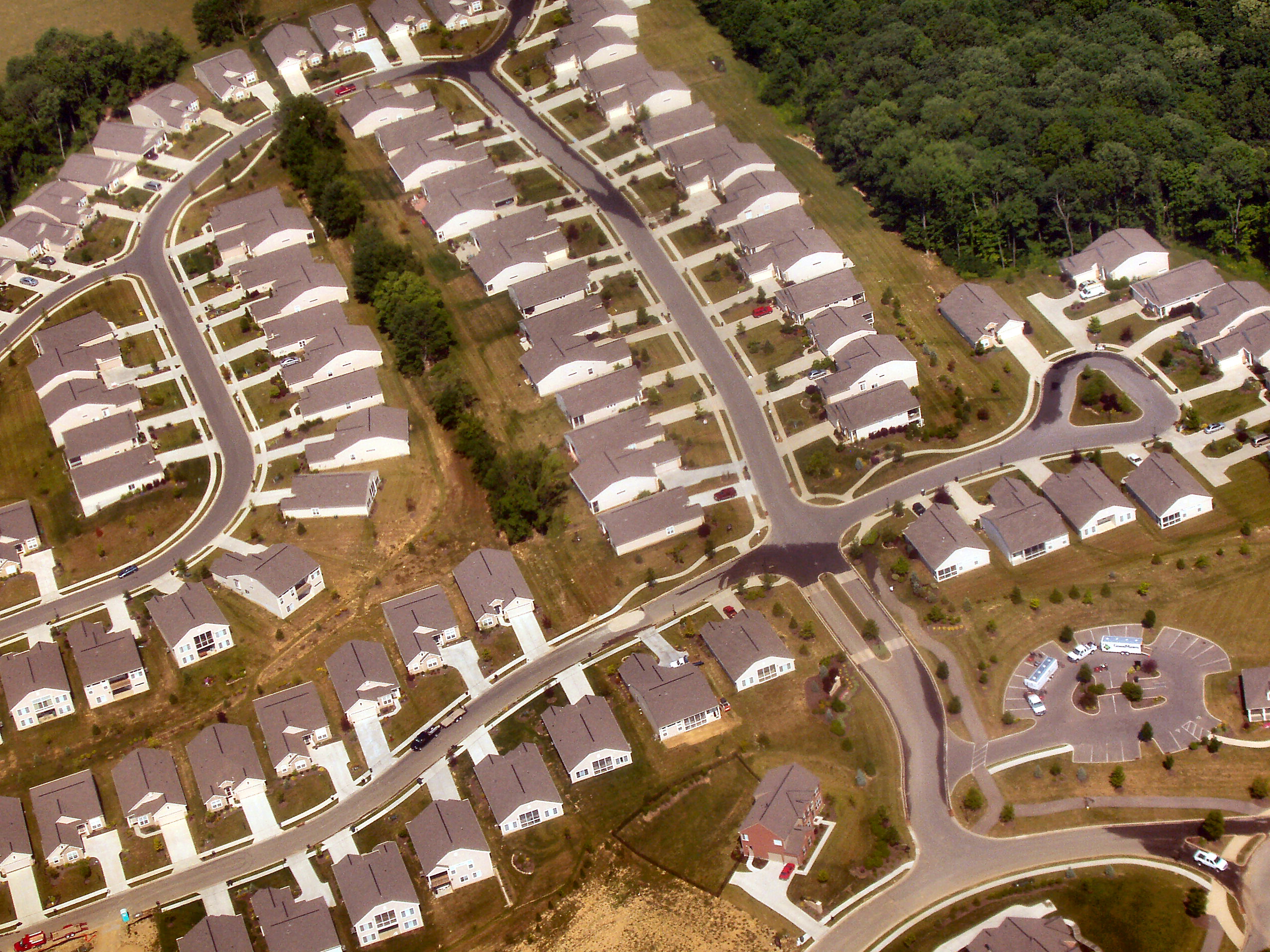
US suburban housing subdivision

The manner in which the public roads network is designed, built and managed can have a significant effect on the utility and safety of cycling as transport. Settlements that provide a dense roads network consisting of interconnected streets will tend to encourage cycling.

In contrast, other communities may use a cul-de-sac based, housing estate/housing subdivision model where minor roads are disconnected and only feed into a street hierarchy of progressively more "arterial" type roads. Designs that propose to resolve the contradiction between the cul-de-sac and the traditional interconnected network, such as the fused grid, have been proposed and built with varying levels of success.

In the UK, the principle of 'filtered permeability' has been proposed in some government guidance to maximise the ease of movement of cyclists and pedestrians, whilst constraining it for motor vehicles, see permeability.

== Cycling infrastructure ==
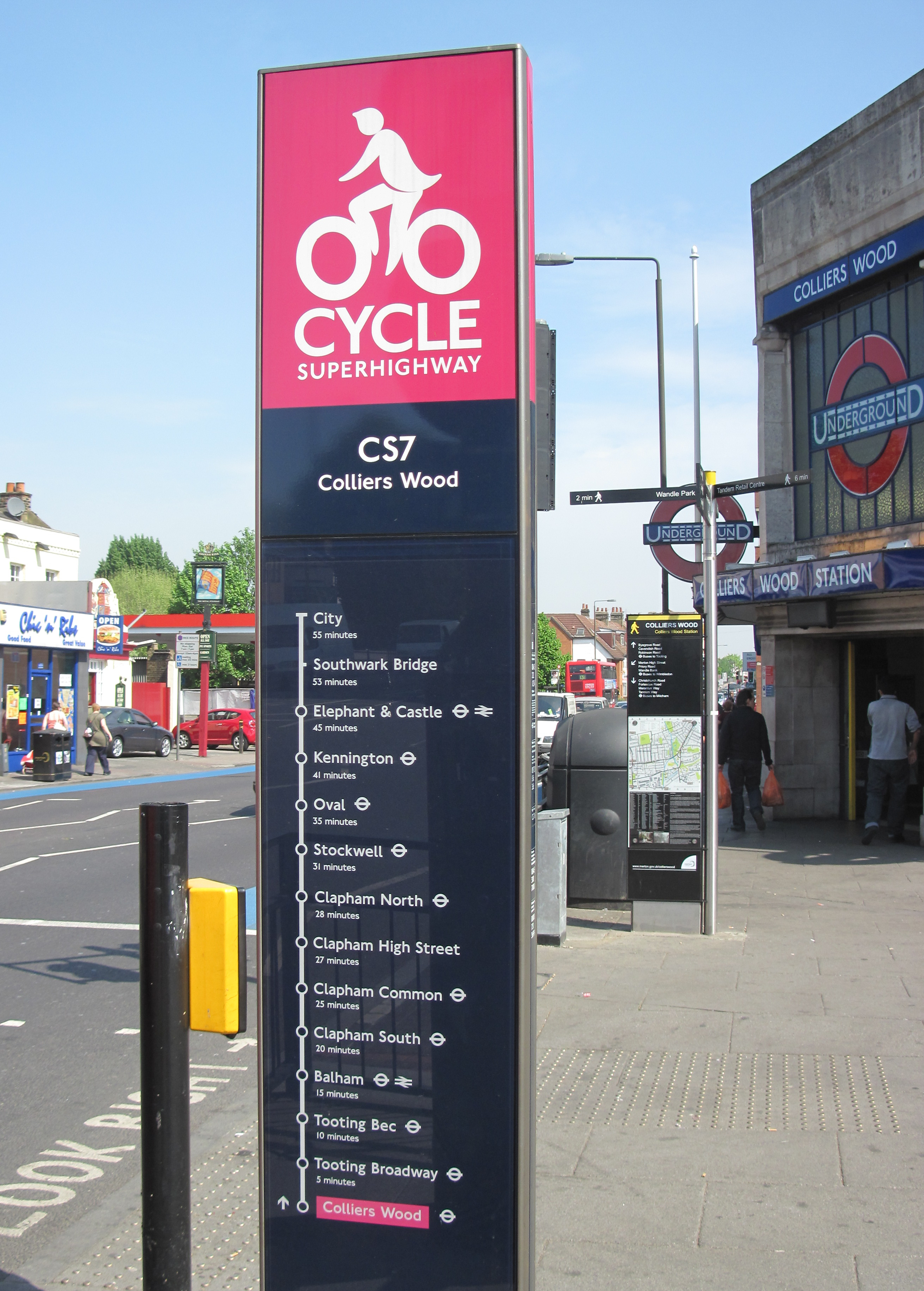
Cycle Superhighway CS7 start point at Colliers Wood Underground Station.

Cycling infrastructure includes bikeways, maps, signs, signals, protected intersections and bicycle parking.

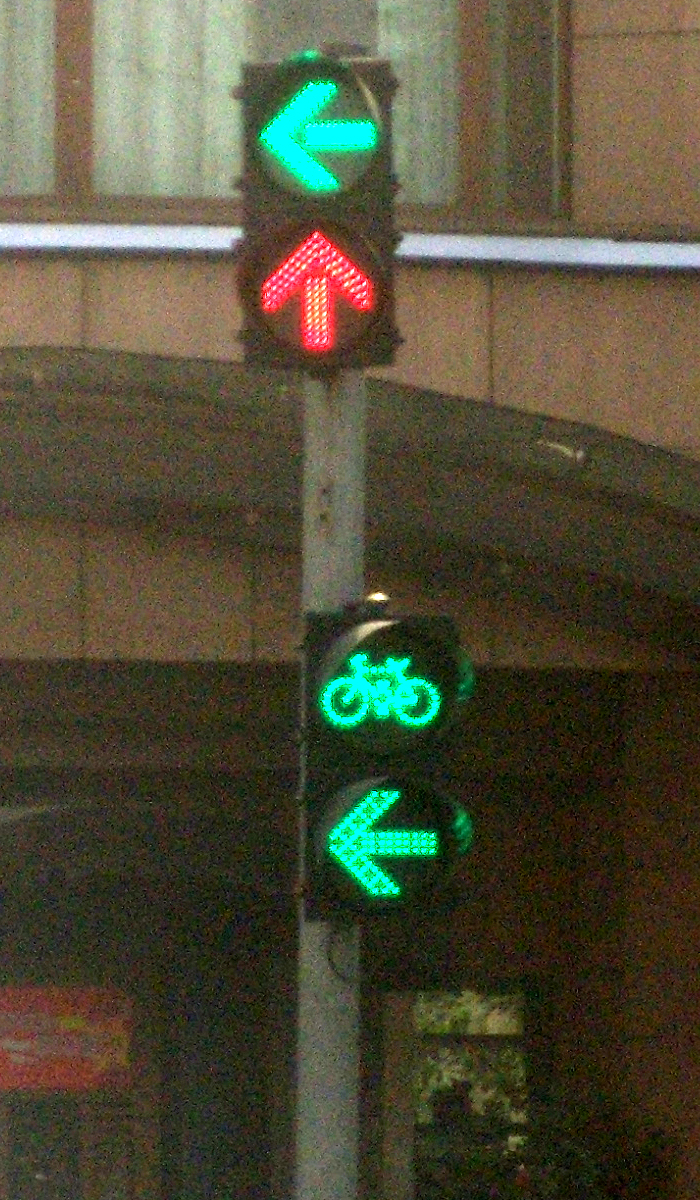
Signals for cyclists in China.

== Benefits of bicycle-friendly communities ==
A community's infrastructure can affect its citizens’ health, especially in regard to obesity and physical activity. Cities that incorporate bicycle routes have a higher percentage of bicycle commuters. Studies have shown that even moderate increases in physical activity can have a substantial effect on health. Bicycling to work has been shown to decrease mortality by as much as 40%.

Bicycling is often used as an alternative to travel by car. Automobile travel provides the perception of increased mobility and convenience for travelers, but also has high costs associated with taxes, insurance, fuel, maintenance, road construction and repair, and contributes to air pollution. When infrastructure is built to allow consumers to choose between automobile and other forms of travel, it reduces a community's automobile dependency and allows for more efficient transport choices and land usage.

== Recognition ==
In the U.S., the League of American Bicyclists has formally recognized some cities as bicycle-friendly communities for "providing safe accommodation and facilities for bicyclists and encouraging residents to bike for transportation and recreation."

== Tourism ==
The British tourist board award holiday accommodation providers who are cycle friendly with a "Cycle Friendly" award.

The League of American Bicyclists designated New Orleans as a Bicycle Friendly City in 2011.

== See also ==
- 15-minute city – Urban accessibility concept
- Active living – Physically active way of life
- Active mobility – Unmotorised transport powered by activity
- Bicycle safety – Safety practices to reduce risk associated with cycling
- Complete streets – Transportation policy and design approach
- Cyclability
- Cycling advocacy
- Utility cycling – Bicycling as transportation
- Living street – Traffic calming in spaces shared between road users
- Mikael Colville-Andersen
- Outline of cycling
- Principles of intelligent urbanism
- Road safety
- Safety of cycling infrastructure
- Sustainable Development Goal 11 – 11th of 17 Sustainable Development Goals for sustainable cities
- Urban vitality
