= Fused grid =

Type of urban planning design

Diagram of a fused grid district showing four neighbourhoods and a mixed use zone

The fused grid is a street network pattern first proposed in 2002 and subsequently applied in Calgary, Alberta (2006) and Stratford, Ontario (2004). It represents a synthesis of two well known and extensively used network concepts: the "grid" and the "Radburn" pattern, derivatives of which are found in most city suburbs. Both concepts were conscious attempts to organize urban space for habitation.

The grid was conceived and applied in the pre-automotive era of cities starting circa 2000 BC and prevailed until about 1900 AD. The Radburn pattern emerged in 1929 about thirty years following the invention of the internal combustion engine powered automobile and in anticipation of its eventual dominance as a means for mobility and transport. Both these patterns appear throughout North America.

Fused refers to a systematic recombination of the essential characteristics of each of these two network patterns.

== Terminology and history ==
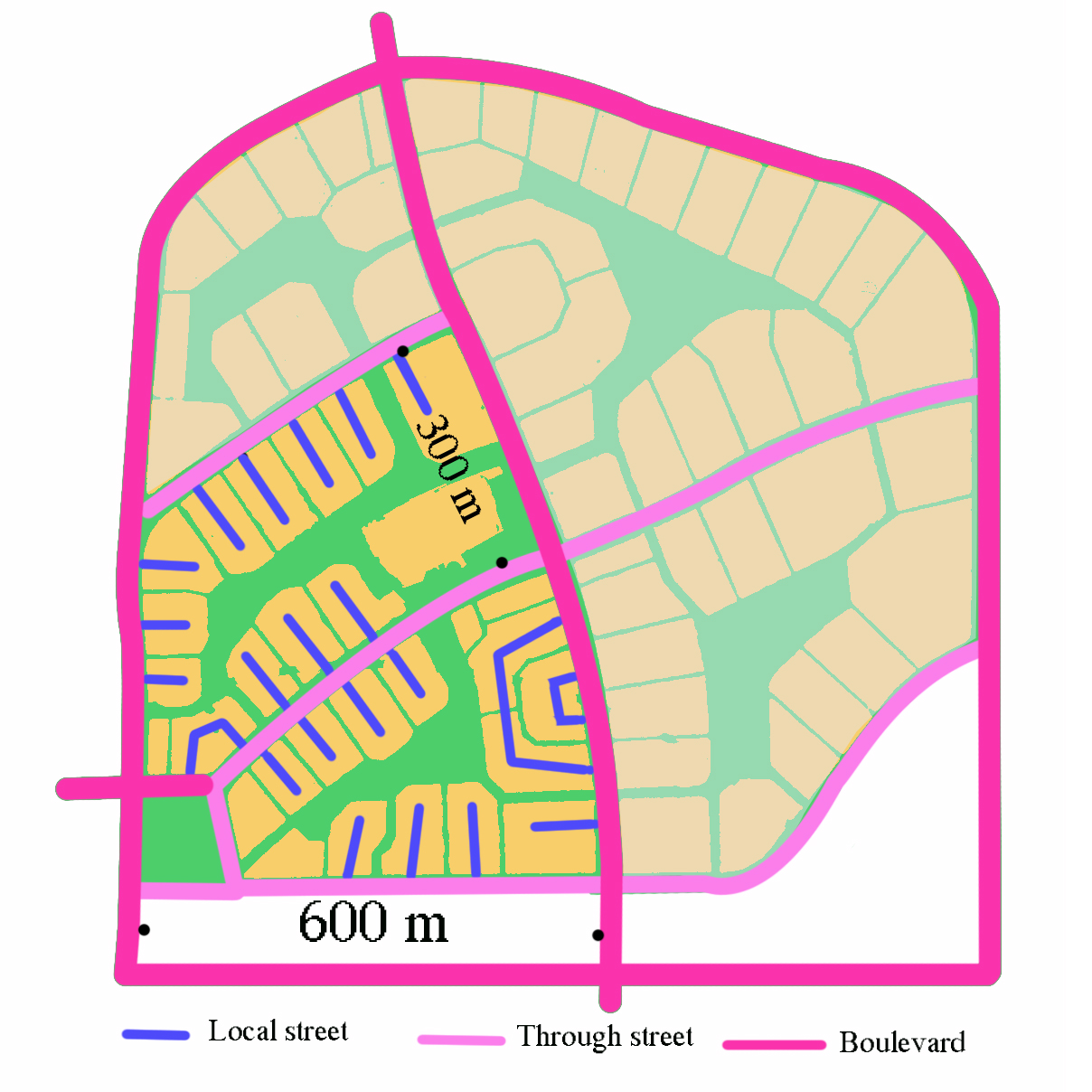
A diagram showing the street network structure of Radburn, New Jersey and its nested hierarchy. (The shaded area was not built.)

Modern urban planners generally classify street networks as either organic or planned. Planned networks tend to be organized according to geometric patterns, while the organic networks are believed to emerge from spontaneous, unorganized growth.

Architectural historian Spiro Kostof writes that "The word grid is a convenient, and imprecise, substitute for orthogonal planning. Gridiron in the US implies a pattern of long narrow blocks, and 'checkerboard' a pattern of square blocks." In addition to the right angle being a key characteristic, a second attribute of equal importance is its imputed openness and unconstrained expandability. Loosely interpreted, the term "grid" can be applied to plans such as the Vitruvian octagonal plan for an ideal city, resembling a spider web, or to plans composed of concentric circles. These are all grids in that a regularly spaced armature leaves recurring openings and that they could, conceivably, expand outward.

The emergence of the pure, rectilinear, orthogonal grid, or Hippodamian grid, is explained by the natural tendency of people to walk in a straight line, particularly in the absence of obstacles and on level land. This intuitive explanation leaves the question of pre-grid and post grid non-rectilinear city patterns to be better understood, particularly those on plane territory such as Marrakech. Another potential influence may have been exerted by the second frequent user of city streets – horses. Horses also tend to move in a straight line, particularly at trotting, canter or galloping pace. When horses serve a city and draw chariots singly or in pairs, or, similarly, carts for a variety of transportation and processional functions, straight line travel becomes imperative; turns force a sluggish pace and cumbersome manoeuvres that reduce their efficiency of movement. The need for speed is accentuated by city size; distances to the public functions at the centre increase and, consequently, the need for quick access is intensified. Speed in turn implies straight lines. It is plausible that the drivers for rectilinear layouts may have been man's horses, mules, and carts as much as man himself, spurred by the growth of settlements.

The creation of the Radburn pattern is attributed to Clarence Stein but has a lineage of ideas that preceded it in Raymond Unwin and Barry Parker's work that included the use of cul-de-sac and crescent street types. In contrast to the scarcity of records that obscures the original rationale for the grid, the reasons for the Radburn pattern have been articulated clearly in Stein's writings and those of his predecessors.

The term Radburn (after a place in New Jersey) now denotes a street network configuration. It signifies a departure from the strict orthogonal geometry and regularity of the grid and a distinct approach to laying out new districts. As a system, it can be described more accurately as a "cellular" network that has a characteristic hierarchy of streets as distinct from identical streets intersecting at regular intervals. Its derivatives and idiosyncratic imitations are often characterized as "cul-de-sac and loop" patterns highlighting the distinguishing street types that are used systematically in this network. A second term equally uncharacteristic is suburban. This association of a pattern with a location is inaccurate and unintentionally misleading: entire early cities such as Cairo and Fez are structured on this pattern whose newer suburbs follow the grid reversing the urban/suburban relationship. Suburban configurations are also devoid of geometric descriptors of the pattern. These shorthand expressions conceal the variety of patterns that emerged in the 20th century that are decidedly neither grids nor "Radburn" and the "system" aspect of the pattern. The loop and lollipop label may be a more applicable descriptor of later interpretations of the Radburn model that appear to lack structure and to overlook key elements of the original concept such as its emphasis on pedestrian priority, for example. The pattern's systematic use of the cul-de-sac and loop is decidedly linked to automotive mobility as a means of controlling and guiding its flow. The Radburn pattern is a complex system; more than a series of identical orthogonal city blocks in a linear progression. It rests on a functional program plus an intentional picturesque aesthetic: it avoids straight lines, limits four-way intersections and shuns repetitive blocks all of which enhance its picturesque imagery. To facilitate the discussion, the name Radburn-like or Radburn-type will be used in the subsequent sections.

== Criticisms of the prevailing network patterns ==
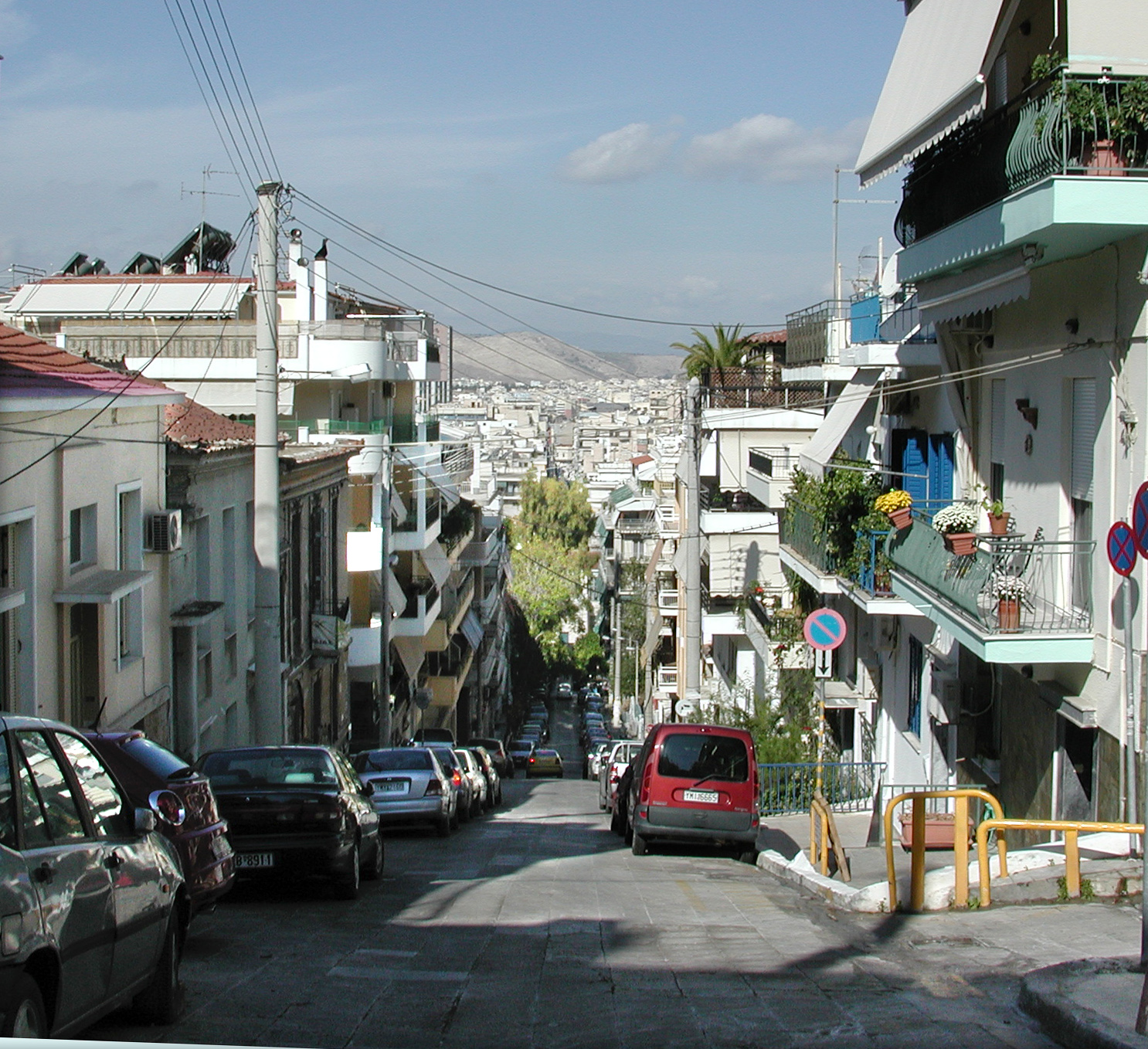
One of several streets of the grid that was applied to the hilly site of Piraeus.

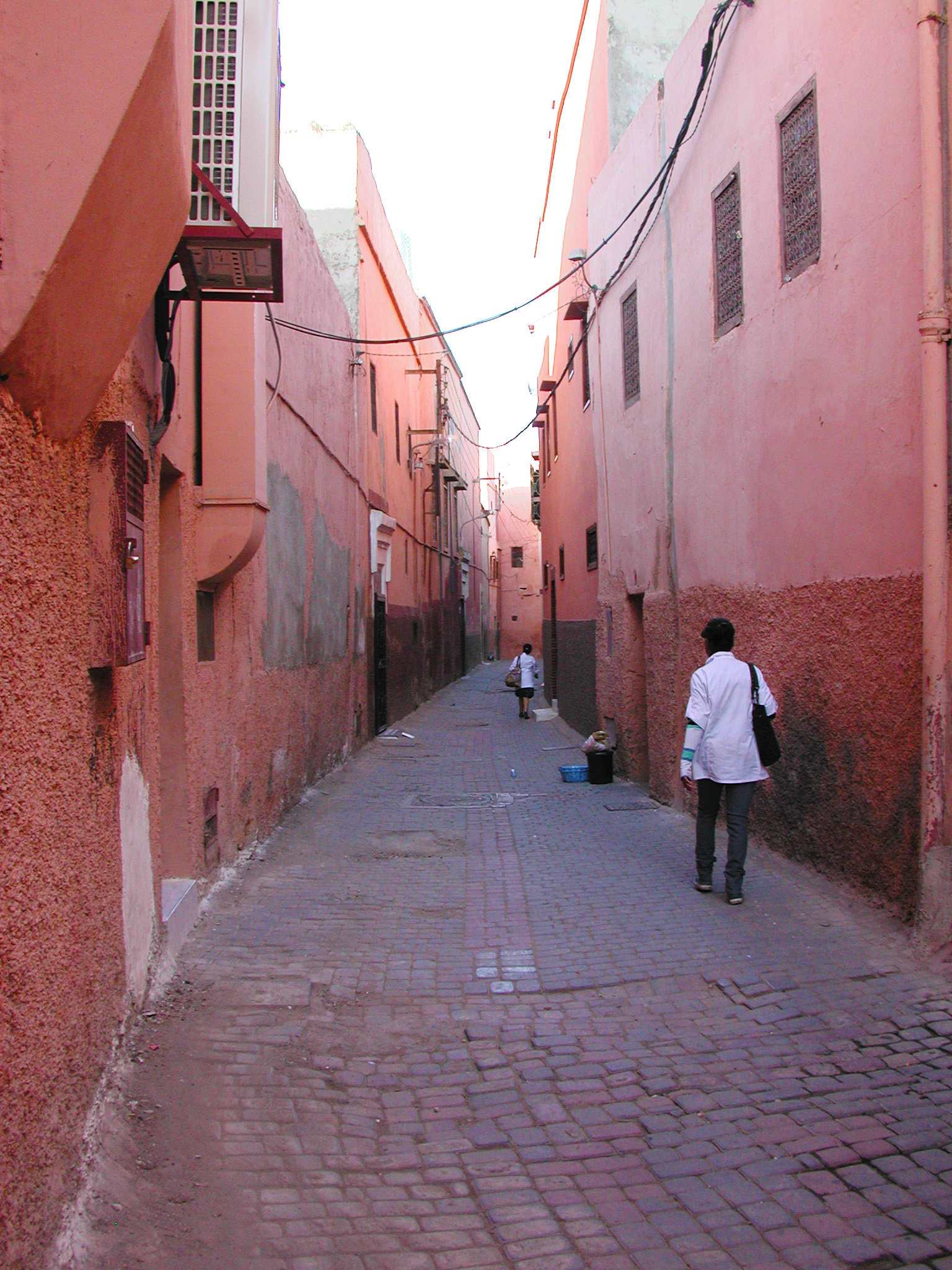
A street in the Medina of Marrakech, showing the "wall" effect of agglutinated buildings and the absence of lower floor windows.

The two dominant network patterns, the grid and Radburn, have been debated by planners, transportation engineers and social observers on grounds that include issues of defence, aesthetics, adaptability, sociability, mobility, health, safety, security and environmental impact.

=== Defence, aesthetics, and adaptability ===
The first known criticism of the grid was put forward on the grounds of defence that became irrelevant following the prevalence of the cannon (1500s). Aristotle argued that the old maze-like street pattern, which preceded the grid, made it difficult for invading troops to find their way in and out of the city, Alberti also expressed the same view 1500 years later and added the advantage of a superior visual effect of the organic pattern over the grid. A second criticism was put forward most forcefully by Camillo Sitte on aesthetic grounds. He argued that grids lack variety and, consequently, are uninteresting and can become oppressive by their monotony. This argument has been undermined first by the potential variety of grid dimensions that can be used in combinations such as appear in many city plans. More importantly, ground observation of cities shows that the mix of buildings and their varied street alignments as well as open spaces with their size variations coupled with constant redevelopment, suppress the monotony of the grid. Nonetheless, 20th century planners shunned pure grids and implicitly endorsed C. Sitte's ideas on the need for a picturesque streetscape. This tendency is generally based on an intuitive aesthetic ground; that people dislike long open street vistas and prefer those that terminate. Recent subdivision or town layouts such as Poundbury (1993), Seaside (1984) and Kentlands (1995) consciously avoided the homogeneous grid and its open vistas. A further criticism of the grid focuses on its unsuitability for uneven, variegated terrain. Its application in sites such as Priene (350 BC), Piraeus (circa 400 BC), San Francisco (1776), Saint John, NB (1631) and others severely limits general accessibility by inadvertently introducing steep slopes or, in certain cases, stepped road sections and creates construction difficulties. In cities with intemperate climates this limitation is accentuated. Moving in a straight line uphill becomes arduous or, occasionally, impossible, particularly for non-motorized wheeled means of transport.

A Radburn-type network inherently includes a variety of city blocks and terminating vistas and, consequently, preempts criticism centered on monotony and lack of end-closure. Its unconstrained geometry adapts easily to topographical irregularities and geographical features such as streams, woodlots and natural ponds. As neither the alignment nor the length of neighbourhood streets need to remain constant, this model gives planners considerable latitude in laying out a network.

Two newer aesthetic criticisms of the Radburn model emerged in the 1980s: the absence of a street "wall" or "enclosure" and the repetitiveness of housing unit forms as found in suburban districts. Both these criticisms can be understood as a misapplication of aesthetic norms on socio-economic outcomes. The spaciousness of housing developments at the city's edge echoes the spaciousness of contemporary houses and are both driven not by aesthetic intent but by economic prosperity. Judging the visual outcome of prosperity using historic streetscape criteria of cities with a different socioeconomic makeup would make the verdict predictable and practically meaningless.

Moreover, the "street wall" and "enclosure" criticism of the Radburn pattern applications are undermined by observation of city districts new and old. Close examination would reveal that these spatial qualities are inextricably linked to housing unit and population density as well as construction technology and are not necessarily the outcome of a street pattern: The higher the habitation density of the street (and town) the closer and taller the buildings have to be to accommodate more people. A street pattern does not induce either unit density or the visual wall effect. For example, in earlier cities with labyrinthine street layouts, analogous to some contemporary suburban districts, residential buildings were agglutinated creating an entire perimeter wall around the city block with few perforations for reasons of security, safety and a heightened sense of privacy, not streetscape aesthetic. Conversely, early founded cities in North America, where land was almost free but construction costly, are depicted with generous lot dimensions and very small houses on them (e.g. Salt Lake City) that created a weak "enclosure" vertically and horizontally. At both ends of the streetscape scale, very proximate and very sparse buildings, socio-economic factors drive the outcome.

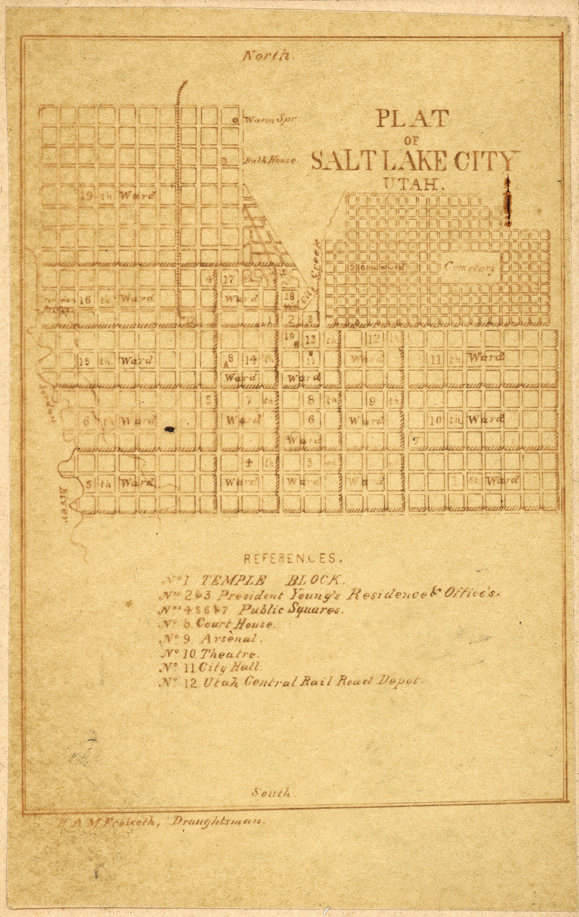
Surveyor's plan of Salt Lake City, circa 1870s – an example of a uniform square grid

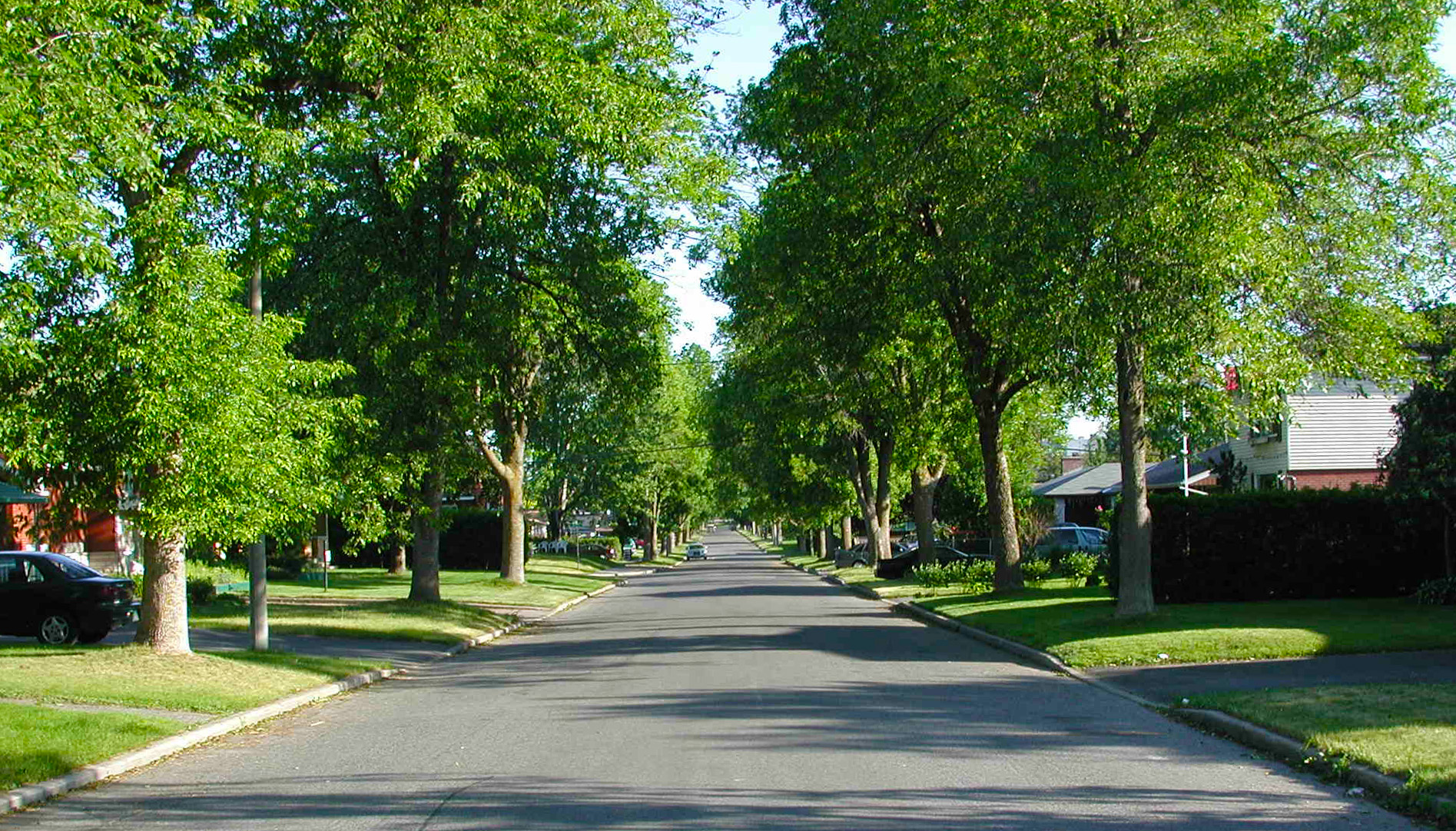
A straight street of a grid pattern in a 1950s suburb exhibiting low density, single family detached housing

Regarding repetitiveness of housing form, ground observation shows no relation to street pattern. Homogeneity correlates better with methods of production. Early agglutinated housing forms as in Pompeii and Tunis, with vastly different street patterns, presented no face on the street by which design differences could be discerned; plain and luxurious houses had the same nondescript, blank street face. In recent times, older streets of more recent cities with a grid show considerable replication, based on vernacular and pattern books, as do newer streets on the fringe, based on industrialization. What has impacted the urban landscape appreciably is the scale of production: many single operators in earlier periods with small yearly output versus few large corporations by mid-20th century with high annual production volumes. Inevitably, the larger the operation is, the greater the economies of repetition are. Similar house models can be found not only in the same subdivision but across states and even nations. For example, veterans housing that was built in Canada consists of two or three models that were repeated in neighbourhoods and across the country. The most impressive effect of large-scale production is starkly visible in Levittown, New York (1947) and in social housing projects, where the State also aims at economies of scale. In the case of early Huguenot settlements, sameness of houses on identical grid patterns was pursued as a means of expressing the social equality of all inhabitants – a community goal.

=== Housing unit density ===
Derivatives and variations of the Radburn street network pattern, collectively "the suburbs", have been criticized on the grounds of their relative low density. The low density criticism appears to be based on a historical coincidence mistaken for causality: most low density housing developments occurred in the 20th century at the periphery of existing cities after 1950 and intentionally incorporated cul-de-sac or looped streets (Radburn-inspired street types) regularly. By contrast, dense development occurred earlier (and continues) in city central areas most of which were laid on a grid pattern in the 19th century or earlier. This topological coincidence of pattern and density can be easily mistaken as a causal relationship. Radburn (1929), a suburb, was built at a density (19 persons per acre) higher than subsequent suburbs such as Kentlands (14 persons per acre) that were laid out on a grid-type pattern. Also, many early grid-plan towns and suburbs such as Windermere, Florida, Dauphin, Manitoba, and St. Andrews, New Brunswick exhibit grid layouts and very low densities. Conversely, incidental cul-de-sac and crescent streets in central areas show high densities. Examples of unusual, unconventional associations of density and street type demonstrate that street patterns are coincidentally, not causally, related to housing density. Any given street pattern can be built at a predetermined density.

=== Security ===
Questions have been raised about the potential effect that the street patterns of a neighbourhood may play a role in the frequency that its homes are targets of theft and property damage. These questions were prompted by the apparent higher concentration of such events in certain neighbourhoods over the general average. This potential connection has been debated extensively. Factors such as sample size, analytical methods and the inclusion or omission of socio-demographic profiles of offenders, victims and neighbourhoods can confound the research outcomes. Yet some tentative correlations have been discerned.

Experiments are rarely possible in existing neighbourhoods where the street pattern, the properties and the residents are given and inalterable. One such rare experiment, however, was tried in Five Oaks, Dayton, Ohio. A "troubled" neighbourhood's street pattern was converted from the regular grid to an interrupted grid resembling the Radburn pattern. The transformed layout was made discontinuous for cars but continuous for pedestrians through the use of connected cul-de-sacs. Following the change, the drop in antisocial incidents was substantial and immediate suggesting that the Radburn-like pattern contributed to it since all other factors remained practically unchanged. Observational studies rest on cross-sectional statistical analysis of neighbourhoods to derive potential correlations between street patterns and the level of antisocial incidents. One such study concluded that:

1. flats are always safer than houses and the wealth of inhabitants matters;
2. density is generally beneficial but more so at ground level;
3. local movement is beneficial, larger scale movement not so;
4. relative affluence and the number of neighbours has a greater effect than either being on a cul-de-sac or being on a through street.
5. As for permeability, it suggests that residential areas should be permeable enough to allow movement in all directions but no more. The over-provision of poorly used permeability is a crime hazard.

It also re-established that simple, linear cul-de-sac streets with good numbers of dwellings that are joined to through streets tend to be safe. Of the five concluding observations three are unrelated to network pattern, indicating the overriding role of socio-economic factors. The consensus among researchers is that streets patterns in themselves cannot be seen as crimino-genic. The genesis of crime rests elsewhere. Of the factors that assist the intent for crime, however, unconstrained permeability appears the most influential. The Radburn pattern restricts permeability while the uniform grid enables it.

== Transportation, traffic, and their effects ==
More significant criticisms of the grid and the Radburn patterns were put forward based on the new urban transportation context of unprecedented levels of motorised mobility that raises issues of traffic congestion, collisions, accessibility, connectivity, legibility for pedestrian and driver, noise disturbance, car travel extent, air and water pollution, and greenhouse gas emissions. The importance of these criticisms rests on judging the functional adequacy of alternative networks regarding these aspects. Dysfunctional systems could entail heavy economic and social burdens that may be avoidable.

=== Mobility and congestion ===
The introduction of mechanized personal transport in large numbers during the 20th century tested every existing network's characteristics and their capacity to function satisfactorily for mobility and for city living in general. And since most cities where the motorcar first appeared had a grid layout,(e.g. New York, Chicago, and London) it was inevitably the first network pattern to experience its impact.

The grid's emergence in a pedestrian world, in which wheeled traffic of horse-drawn carts was limited, along with its extensive replication, attest indirectly to its functional adequacy for pedestrian movement. The new question about its adequacy for serving motorized movement and for serving both prime modes, motorized and non-motorized in combination, continues to be debated.

The earliest known evidence of people realizing uninterrupted, orthogonal grid plans had disadvantages was found in Pompeii, which was a city on the south eastern coast of Italy destroyed by a major volcanic eruption in 79 AD. The city was buried under a thick layer of volcanic ash, which preserved it very well. Archeologists dug up the ash in order to study the area. People who lived in Pompeii walked, rode on horses' backs, and rode in wagons pulled by horses, and traffic moved at five to ten kilometers (three to six miles) per hour. People were not allowed to turn left at certain intersections, and some roads were one way. Today, these are standard recommendations to handle traffic. The number and speed of vehicles on roads have increased a lot since Pompeii was destroyed, and people have gotten better at recording and understanding traffic problems, so the issues with grids are more obvious.

Operational methods to control the flow of traffic and avoid collisions were introduced and grew steadily in sophistication, from traffic signs to computer-controlled, time-orchestrated systems. While the necessity of these adaptations provides practical proof of the grid's inadequacy to serve motorized transport unaided, their introduction made theoretical proof harder. Highly advanced computer modeling of traffic flows overcame this difficulty. Another complicating factor in the early stages of motorization was the absence of a characteristic and typical alternative network pattern for a comparative analysis. Unlike the clear geometry of the grid, idiosyncratic, peculiar and site specific layouts, that have no obvious elements of a 'pattern' or 'stencil', cannot be accurately described and generalized. The only distinguishing element of current alternatives is their loose dendrite configuration, which is inherently hierarchical, that could be contrasted with the grid's inherent absence of hierarchy. Since in built districts neither of these networks appears in pure form, another level of complexity is introduced that tempers the certainty of analytical findings.

Of two studies that have attempted the comparison between "Radburn-type" and "grid-type" networks, one is based on two hypothetical layouts for a specific site and the second on an existing district layout and two hypothetical overlays. The relationship of congestion to layout geometry and density have been tested using computer-based traffic modeling. The first study, reported in 1990 compared the traffic performance in a 700-acre (2.8 km2) development that was laid out using two approaches, one with a hierarchical street layout that included cul-de-sac streets and the other a traditional grid. The study concluded that the non-hierarchical, traditional layout generally shows lower peak speeds and shorter, but more frequent intersection delays than the hierarchical pattern. The traditional pattern is not as friendly to the long trips as the hierarchical but friendlier to short trips. Local trips in it are shorter in distance but about equivalent in time with the hierarchical layout.

A second extensive comparative traffic study of a subdivision about 830 acres (3.4 km2) tested three network models. It also tested the resilience of the layouts to an increased traffic load generated by higher residential densities. This study confirmed the previous findings that up to a density of 70 people per hectare (28.3 people per acre) (including jobs) – which is above the average range of subdivision densities of 35 to 55 pph – the grid layout had a marginally higher or equal delay per trip to the Radburn-type network. At a 90 pph, the conventional pattern showed marginally higher delay per trip than the grid. This outcome suggests that within the normal range of residential subdivision densities the grid has a slight disadvantage, but under very dense conditions the slight advantage reverses in favour of the grid-type and that both may be subject to improvement.

=== Traffic safety ===
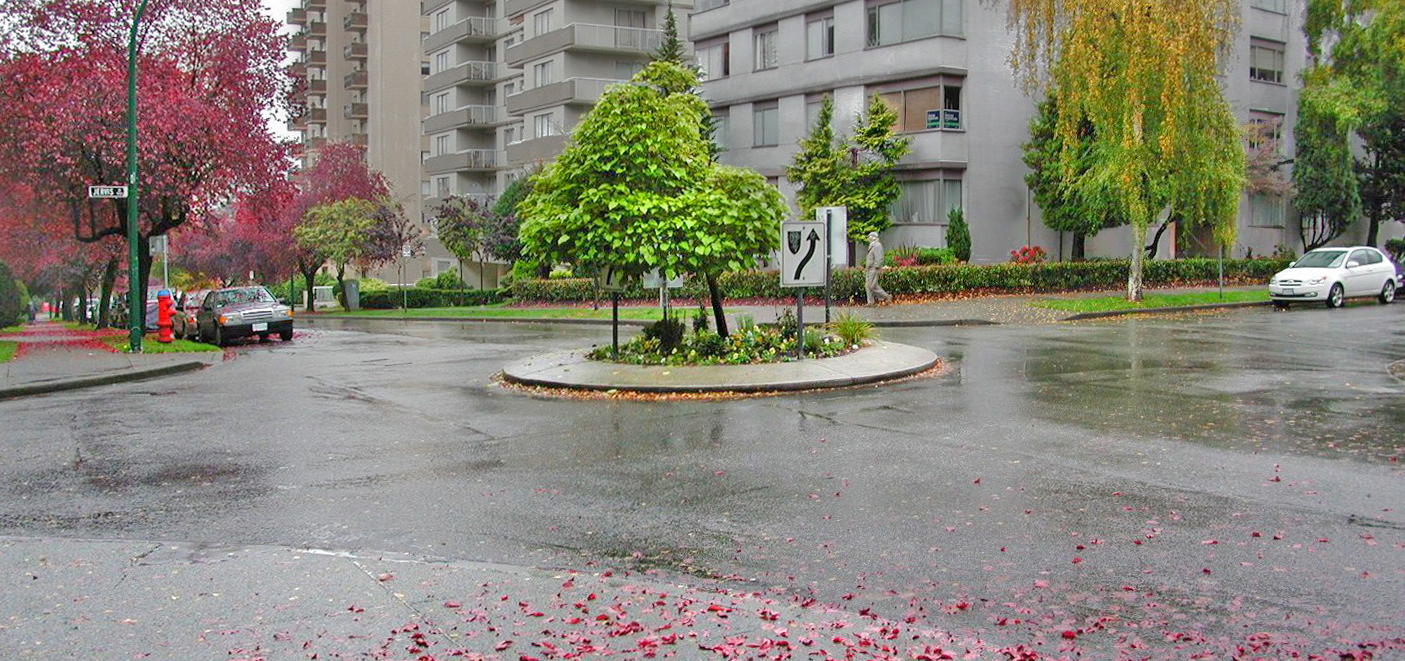
A roundabout (traffic circle) applied to a four-way intersection as a means of improving its safety. This device, with a proven record of collision reductions and traffic flow improvement, turns the cross-intersection into four virtual T-junctions (three-way intersections).

The grid's traffic safety performance in comparison to other network types has been studied extensively and a general consensus is emerging both in theory and practice that, in general, it is the least safe of all currently used network patterns. A 1995 study found significant differences in recorded accidents between residential neighbourhoods that were laid out on a grid and those that included cul-de-sacs and crescents. The frequency of accidents was measurably higher in the grid neighbourhoods.

Two subsequent studies examined the frequency of collisions in two regional districts using the latest analytical tools. They investigated the potential correlation between street network patterns and frequency of collisions. In one 2006 study, cul-de-sac networks appeared to be much safer than grid networks, by nearly three to one. A second 2008 study found the grid plan to be the least safe by a significant margin with respect to all other street patterns in the set. A 2009 study suggests that land use patterns play a significant role in traffic safety and should be considered in conjunction with the network pattern. While land use matters, intersection types also affect traffic safety. Intersections in general reduce the incidence of fatal crashes due to reductions in speed, but four-way intersections, which occur regularly in a grid, increase total and injurious crashes significantly, all other things being equal. The study recommends hybrid street networks with dense concentrations of T-intersections and concludes that a return to the 19th century gridiron is undesirable.

Improved traffic safety has been shown to result from modifications to existing neighbourhoods laid out on a grid, indirectly suggesting its weakness with respect to safety. One study of the impacts of modifications found that Area-wide urban traffic-calming schemes reduce the number of injury accidents by about 15 percent on average. The largest reduction of accidents is found for residential streets (about 25 percent); a somewhat smaller (about 10%) reduction is found for main roads.

=== Vulnerable road users ===
Following the introduction of motorized transport, pedestrians do not fare well in cities. Their space and freedom of movement has gradually been curtailed and the risk of injury increased. They are now seen and studied as Vulnerable Road Users (VRU) along with bicycle riders because of their overwhelming disadvantage in the case of a collision.

Pedestrians experience stress and delay at every intersection, particularly when their mobility has been compromised either temporarily or through the aging process. A delay is unwelcome to pedestrians given that their slow speed and limited range of reach; the more frequent the intersections the higher the delay. Given the grid's origin as a network for pedestrian movement, it is important to understand how it serves pedestrians when it must synchronously serve vehicular traffic. A 2010 study concluded that of seven network patterns, including the Radburn-type pattern, the grid was the least safe for vulnerable road users such as pedestrians and bicycles.

=== Legibility ===
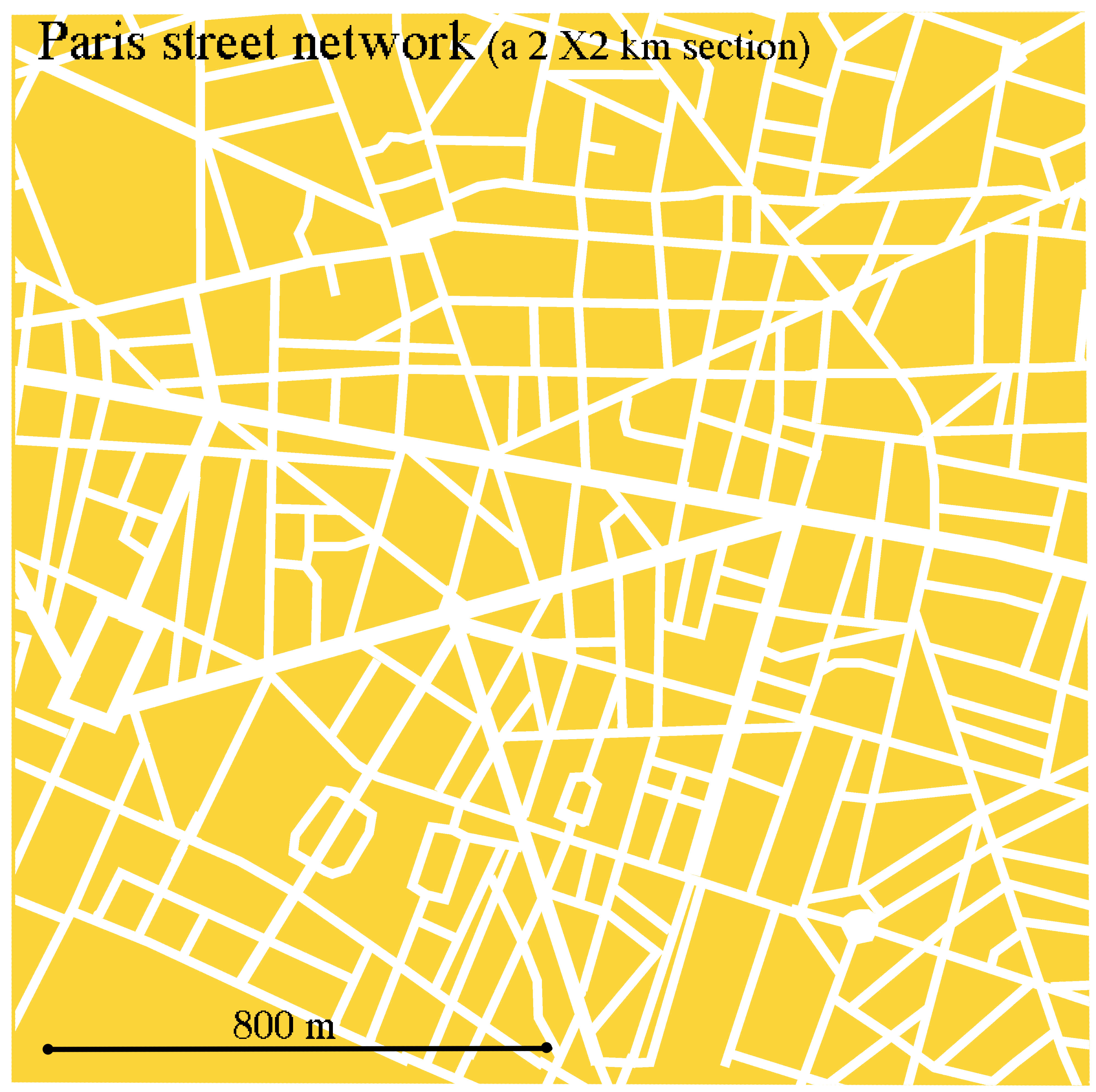
A 2X2 km square segment of the street network of Paris with an approximate scale bar. It shows the highly irregular city blocks and the range of street orientations, both common attributes of many historic cities

Uniform grids with fixed cardinal directions can be mapped as easily on paper as on the mind. This quality — legibility — assists people in finding destinations and prevents the apprehension of being lost. However, this benefit is felt more by visitors to a district than by its residents. Many historic cities with labyrinthine plans, particularly in the medieval period and in the Islamic-Arab world, cause no anxiety to their permanent residents. (Some visitors, equipped with maps, see them as a delightful journey of discovery.) Many parts of Paris, France, for example, exhibit a highly irregular block dimensions and a wide range of street orientations not easily grasped by visitors. Residents quickly acquire many perceptual clues of direction and position without ever seeing printed maps of their domains and, in earlier times, without even the benefit of street signs. Legibility can be an advantage but it is not a necessary condition for a neighbourhood or a town to function well for its residents. While the uniform grid offers utmost legibility, mutated grids and other patterns can function adequately for finding directions.

=== Walkability ===
Walkability refers to those characteristics of an area which enable or hinder one's ability to walk around. More specifically, "walkable" means close; barrier-free; safe; full of pedestrian infrastructure and destinations; and upscale, leafy, or cosmopolitan. Of these characteristics some are related to the street network configuration, such as "close" and "pedestrian infrastructure" while others relate to land use and level of amenity such as destinations and sidewalks. The uniform grid's inherent high frequency and openness makes closeness easily achievable as the chosen routes can be direct. In its central city expression blocks are generally short and equipped with a sidewalk on each side. Suburban grids, however, often depart from the classic square block and include long orthogonal blocks and sidewalks only on one side or none at all. Similarly contemporary versions of the classic Radburn and Hampstead Garden Suburb do not always include pedestrian linkages that were present in the original. They too lack sidewalks, mostly to reduce costs but also on the assumption that resident traffic is low enough for the road pavement to be shared by all without risk.

Published studies examined the relative connectivity of neighbourhoods built following the grid stencil or the Radburn-type pattern. A 1970 study compared Radburn to two other communities, one, Radburn-type (Reston, Virginia) and a second, a nearby unplanned community. It found that 47% of Radburn's residents shopped for groceries on foot, while comparable figures were 23% for Reston and only 8% for the second community. A 2003 study also compared Radburn (1929) to a neo-traditional development (1990). It found that the rates of connectivity differed with the destination. Shopping was considerably more direct and closer in Radburn while the elementary school was just as direct in both but at a marginally longer distance in Radburn. Accessibility to the park was virtually the same. Overall, walkability was marginally better in the Radburn neighbourhood.

A 2010 study, compared eight neighbourhoods of which four followed the grid network rules while the remainder adhered to the Radburn-type network structure. Connectivity, values ranged between 0.71 and 0.82, with the upper limit being 1.00. The grid-like set had two samples above the 0.76 average and one below, while the Radburn-type set had one above average and two below. The amount of walking did not correlate well with the connectivity values indicating that other factors were at play. Walking correlated better when the additional pedestrian infrastructure, independent paths was included. These results confirmed previous findings that while connectivity, the essential characteristic of the grid, is a necessary condition for walkability it is not sufficient by itself to entice walking.

A third study compared seven neighbourhoods by examining their walking and driving activity as an indicator or a network's propensity to entice walking. Using the agent-based modeling method it calculated the amount of walking under identical land use conditions. The traditional uniform grid, two Radburn-type patterns and one neo-traditional grid had lower levels of walking activity than a second version of the neo-traditional grid and the fused grid. Overall the Radburn-type networks had lower average walking scores and higher driving activity. These results show that the influence of the street network on walkability is clearly evident but also dependent on the specific characteristics of its geometry.

=== Transit accommodation ===
Although the grid was introduced long before any system of public transit would become necessary or available, its strict regularity provides sufficient flexibility for mapping transit routes. By contrast, derivatives of the Radburn-type network, particularly the non-cellular and strictly dendrite variety, are inflexible and force transit routes that are often long and circuitous resulting in an inefficient and costly service.

== Environmental issues ==
Until the second half of the 20th century, the prime purpose of linking people to places has also been the prime criterion for judging a network's performance. New criteria surfaced when questions about the impact of development on the environment were raised. In that new context, a network's land consumption; its adaptability to the land's natural features; the degree of water impermeability it introduces; whether it lengthens trips and how it affects the production of greenhouse gases constitute part of a new set of criteria.

=== Adaptability ===
Typical, uniform grids are unresponsive to topography. Priene's plan, for example, is set on a hillside and most of its north–south streets are stepped, a feature that would have made them inaccessible to carts, chariots, and loaded animals. Cities established more recently have utilized a similar approach to Priene's, for example: San Francisco, Vancouver, and Saint John, New Brunswick. In a modern context, steep grades limit accessibility by car and more so by bicycle, on foot, or wheelchair, particularly in cold climates. The strict orthogonal geometry forces roads and lots over creeks, marshes, and woodlots, thus disturbing the local ecology. It is said of the 1811 NY grid plan that it flattened all obstacles in its way. By contrast, the unconstrained geometry of the Radburn-type networks provides sufficient flexibility to accommodate natural features.

=== Land consumption and conservation ===
Depending on the choice of street pattern and the cross section of the street space, streets consume an average 26% of the total developed land. They can range from 20% to over 40%. For example, the Portland grid consumes 41% of the development land in street Right-of-Ways (ROW). At the low end of usage, Stein's Radburn neighbourhood uses about 24% of the total. Villages and towns with narrow streets (2 to 3 m wide) consume much less.

Actual layouts of specific districts show variability within that range due to site-specific conditions and network pattern idiosyncrasies. Land taken up by streets becomes unavailable for development; its use is inefficient since it stays empty for most of the time. Were it to be developed, less land would be required for the same number housing units, resulting in lowering the pressure to consume more of it.

A 2007 study compared alternative layout plans for a 3.4 square kilometre subdivision and found that the traditional grid layout had 43 percent more land dedicated to roads than the conventional Radburn-type network.

=== Water cycle and water quality impacts ===
All new development, irrespective of its network pattern, alters the pre-existing natural condition of a site and its ability to absorb and recycle rain water. Roads are a major factor in limiting absorption by the sheer amount of impermeable surfaces they introduce. They affect water usability by the generation of road surface pollutants that end up downstream making it unfit for direct use.

The grid's inherent high street and intersection frequencies produce large areas of impermeable surfaces in street pavement and sidewalks. In comparison to networks with discontinuous street types, that are characteristic of the Radburn pattern, grids can have up to 30% percent more impermeable surface attributable to roads. One study compared alternative layouts on a 155 ha (383 acre) site and found that the grid-type layout had 17% more impermeable surface area in total compared to the Radburn-type layout.

=== Vehicle kilometres traveled and exhaust emissions ===
Emissions from all transportation account for about 30% of the total from all sources and personal car use amounts to about 60% percent of that share that translates to about 18% percent of the total GHG production. Three factors that affect emissions from personal travel relate to network configuration and function: a) trip length b) speed of travel c) propensity for congestion. Studies have shown that Radburn-type networks could add up to 10 percent to the length of local, short trips. As was seen earlier under congestion, grid-type patterns induce longer trip times that are primarily due to stops at the characteristic and frequent four-way intersections.

A 2007 study compared total traveled kilometres and total estimated emissions. Regarding the trip length, it confirmed previous studies by finding a 6% increase in local VKTs in the Radburn-type layout. The emissions comparison excluded CO_{2} and focused on three noxious (criteria) gases. Totalling the estimated cost of these emissions for ease of comparison, it found a 5% increase in costs for the conventional Radburn type layout.

=== Summary of positive attributes ===
In judging the two currently disputed network concepts it would appear that neither has all the requisite elements needed for adequately responding to the new urban transportation context of extensive motorized mobility. The Radburn pattern fares better overall since it was consciously designed "for the motor age". Similarly, the weaker overall performance of the grid can be understood as innate, given its origin in a predominantly pedestrian world.

Advantages of a Radburn-like pattern:

- less costly to construct and maintain
- more flexible in adapting to the topography
- greater ground permeability
- lower trip delay
- safer for cars and pedestrians, all other things equal
- more picturesque all other things being equal
- may provide a more sociable environment, particularly for children
- may be more secure, all other factors being equal

Advantages of a grid-like network:

- reduces local distances due to its frequency of intersections
- more walkable
- accommodates transit easily
- more legible, when it maintains the orthogonal directions
- easy to lay out as city blocks and plots

== The need for an alternative ==
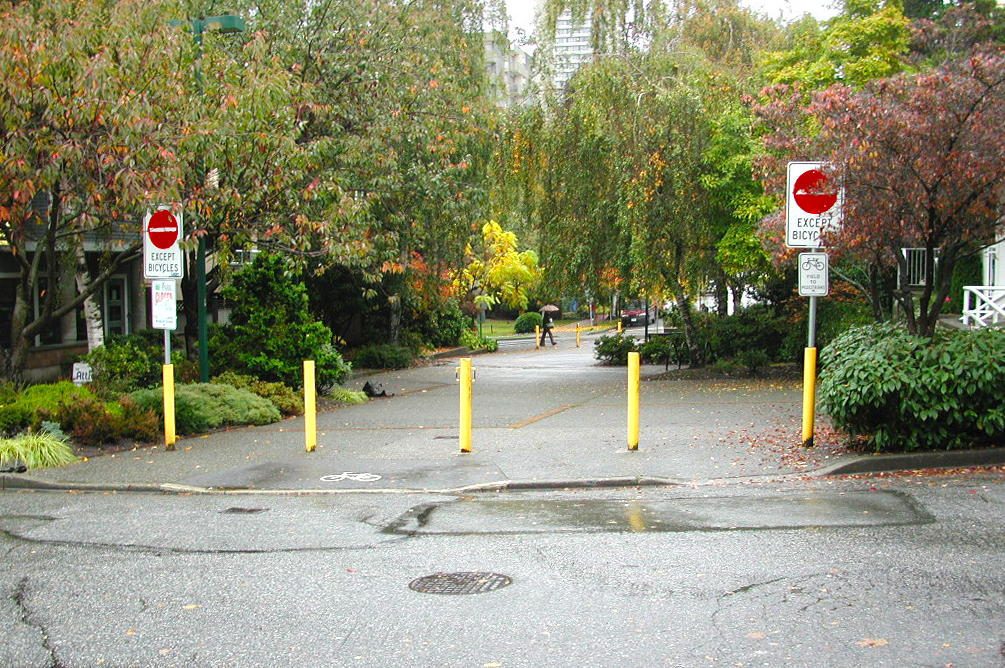
An adaptation to the grid street network (closure) that prevents through car traffic while permitting full access to pedestrians and bicycles

To function well, a contemporary network must include these advantages from the contrasting patterns thus reducing frictions and conflicts in urban environments. The need for an alternative has been evident since the middle of the 20th century for practical and theoretical considerations. In practice, in the second half of the 20th century citizens of many American and European cities have protested against the intrusion of through traffic in their neighbourhoods. Its side-effects were unwelcome as being detrimental to peace, tranquility, health, and safety. In response, cities introduced an armoury of controls to ensure that residential districts retained a high standard of life quality. Among these controls were one-way streets, closures, half-closures, traffic circles, and a liberal use of stop signs. These measures being improvised retrofits implied the need for a network pattern in which techniques such as these would be obviated by innovative design. On the theoretical level, planners analysed the conflicts caused by the new urban mobility, proposed alternative schemes and, in some cases, applied them. Alexander proposed (1977) a genetic code of 10 "patterns" which, when combined would resolve identified conflicts and would produce a convivial, gratifying district milieu. A central idea among them is a traffic impermeable neighbourhood area of about 10 ha, reminiscent of the Radburn plan principle but smaller in size. Doxiadis emphasized the importance of mobility and designed a large orthogonal grid (2 km by 2 km) of arterials to expedite circulation, as seen in Islamabad. He also recognized the need to separate "man from machine" and introduced traffic-impermeable neighbourhoods also generally resembling the Radburn plan.

== The fused grid model ==
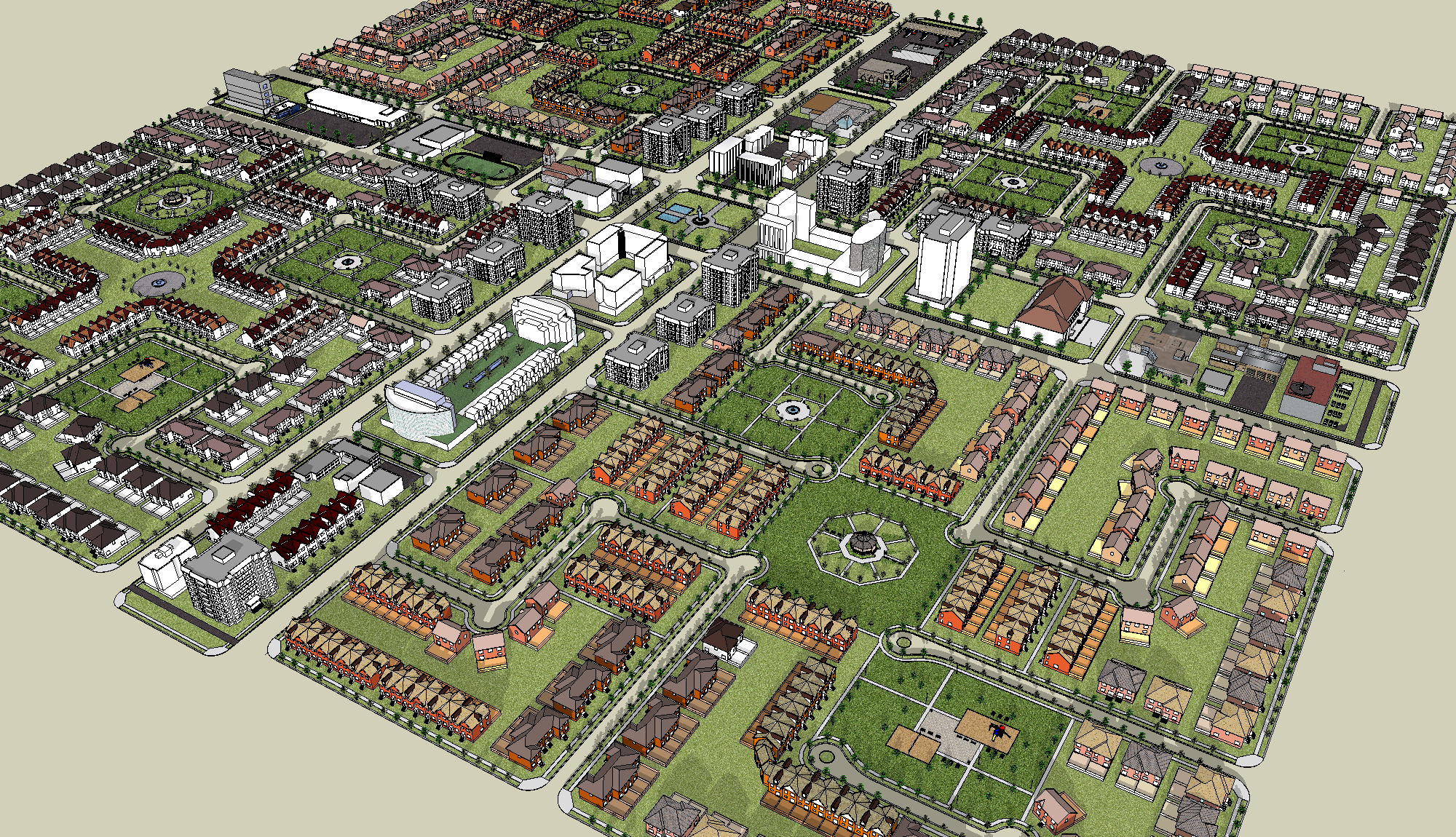
District with four neighbourhoods and mixed use zone, showing the twin connectors

Based on these sets of issues, the identified advantages of alternative patterns and the ideas of 20th century theorists, the fused grid assembles several elements from these precedents into a complete stencil. Just as the grid stencil and the Radburn pattern did, it sets up a geometric structure that exhibits the key characteristics of a functioning system. It consists of a large-scale open grid of collector streets, carrying moderate speed motorized traffic. This grid forms precincts (quadrants, neighbourhoods) that are normally about 16 ha (40 acres) in size (400 m by 400 m). Within each precinct, the layout uses crescents or cul-de-sacs or a combination of both to eliminate through traffic. In addition, a continuous open-space and pedestrian path system provides direct access to parks, public transit, retail, and community facilities. Residents can cross a quadrant block on foot in about five minutes. The most intensive land uses such as schools, community facilities, high-density residential uses, and retail are located in the center of the plan, reached by twinned roads which connect longer, district destination points.

This synthesis of inherited network traditions and ideas is accomplished through the application of two practical means: a rectilinear, orthogonal geometry, a key characteristic of the grid, and the use of two street types that have generally been associated with the Radburn-type subdivisions.

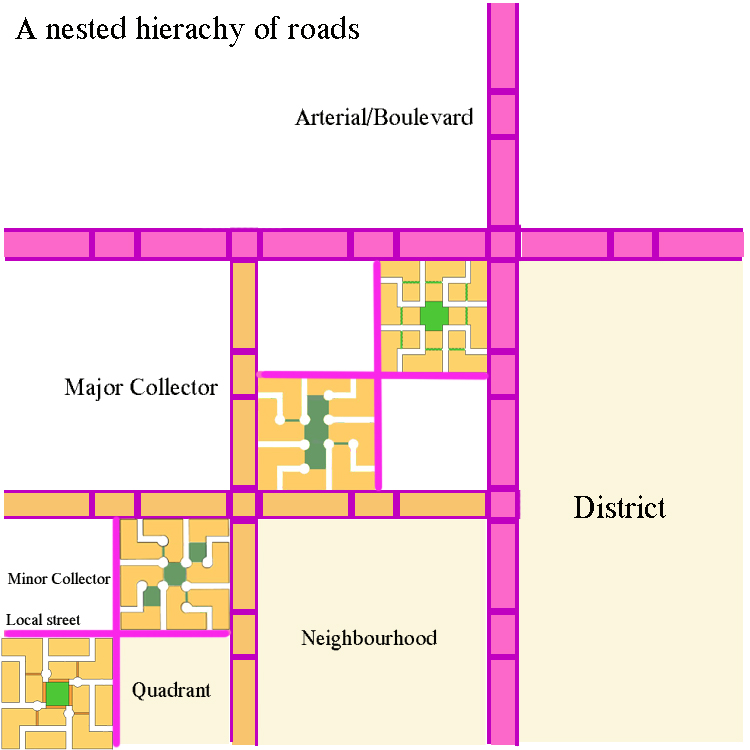
A diagram showing the nested hierarchy of roads in the fused grid transportation network

The orthogonal geometry serves two purposes: a) to enhance the navigability of the network structure particularly at the district and regional scale. This is important at car speeds where decisions about destinations and turns have to be made promptly. b) to maintain a good level of safety at road intersections, as recommended by traffic engineering manuals. The grid's second essential characteristic, connectivity, is recaptured through a third element that completes the "system" – pedestrian-only connectors between regular streets that are intended for all movement modes. These connectors (paths) are typically routed through open spaces that occupy central points in a neighbourhood cell. Thus the neighbourhood street network comprises a mixture of streets; some pedestrian dominant and others car dominant. A fourth element is the nested hierarchy of streets that distinguishes between connectivity and permeability at the neighbourhood level. This idea reflects the fact the longer the linked destinations the higher the level of mobility must be. A dendrite configuration, such as a river, takes progressively wider expanses of land to accommodate the flow. A nested hierarchy on the other hand distributes the flow at each volume level to alternative paths. The complete system, though it may appear unfamiliar, is composed of entirely familiar and extensively used elements in contemporary development.

== Proof of concept ==
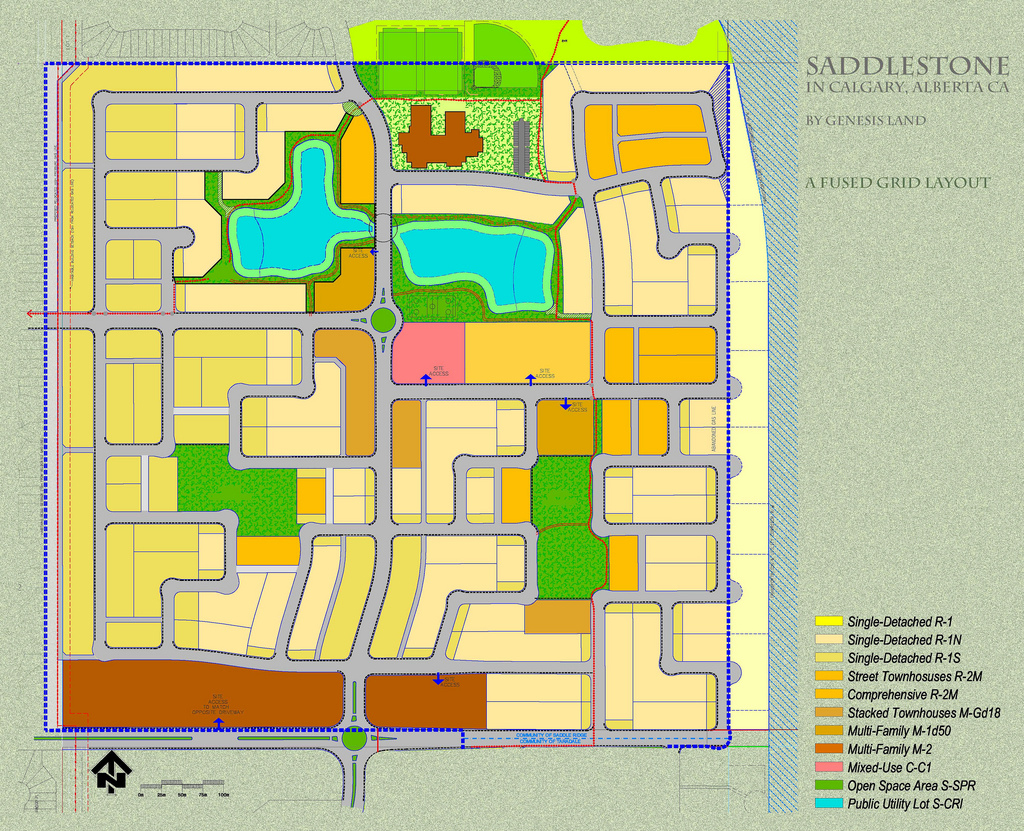
An approved Community Development Plan in Calgary, Alberta that is based on the fused grid model

The model has been applied in two new communities, one in Stratford, ON and the other in Calgary, Alberta. The potential merits of the concept so far have been tested through research; site observations or measurements will await full build-out. The aspects of the model that have been tested correspond to the key criteria of performance, listed above, such as mobility, safety, cost, and environmental impact.

=== Mobility ===
A study on the transportation impacts of the fused grid asserted through comparative analysis using computer-based traffic modeling that the fused grid produces the least total delay in all four density scenarios tested and performed progressively better as the density increased. Taking the fused grid as 100 (base), the delay was 32% more for the conventional Radburn-type pattern and 27% higher for the grid-type pattern. At the next higher density level the difference between patterns increased and they were correspondingly 100 (fused grid), 152 (Radburn-type) and 126 (grid -type). Traffic modeling shows the potential of the fused grid to reduce time delay during peak hours and, therefore, congestion.

=== Traffic safety ===
In a fused grid, three-way intersections are more common than four-way, which have been shown by traffic studies to be less safe. One study found that for each probable collision in the fused grid there would be 2.55 collisions in a standard grid, 2.39 in a layout designed to Dutch "sustainable road safety" guidelines, 1.46 in a cul-de-sac layout and 0.88 in a 3-way Offset layout.

=== Walkability ===
An extensive study of neighbourhoods based on geo-coded trips to local destinations found that a fused grid type of layout increases home-base walking trips by 11.3% in comparison to the conventional grid and it is associated with a 25.9% increase in the odds that residents will meet the recommended physical activity levels. Its 10% increase in relative connectivity for pedestrians is associated with a 23% decrease in vehicle kilometres of local travel.

A second study compared seven neighbourhoods of different street network layouts for the daily travel patterns including the amount of walking that occurred. It found that the fused grid had considerably more walking activity. The set of network patterns included two versions of the traditional grid, two versions of post-war suburbs, two versions of the Traditional Neighbourhood Development (i.e. modified grid) and the fused grid. The lowest amount of walking was found to happen in one of the post-war conventional subdivision. Setting this as the base (100) for the purpose of comparison, the two classic grids registered 11%, one conventional subdivision 109%, one TND neighbourhood 108%, the second TND 137% and the fused grid 143%. In terms of the total distance walked, the fused grid registered 23% larger distance than the lowest of the seven in the set which was also reflected in the lowest amount of local driving.

The fused grid anticipates the location of convenience shopping and amenities at the periphery of the four-quadrant neighbourhood. In such a configuration any part of the neighbourhood is a five-minute walk to the periphery and a ten-minute walk across the entire neighbourhood. Closeness of destinations is inherent in the structure of the network. The same structure, based on 400 m intervals, coincides with current practices for transit route location. Consequently, the street network pattern, the anticipated land use distribution and the location of transit stops are all conducive to walking.

=== Health outcomes ===
Neighbourhood layouts may indirectly influence the health and wellbeing of residents through their effect on factors such as noise, air quality, and physical activity. Noise levels and duration of exposure correlate with traffic volume and speed. According to a traffic analysis study neighbourhood streets in the fused grid layout exhibit the lowest traffic volumes when compared to alternative layouts. By inference, low volumes imply lower duration of exposure to noise. Frequent turns in the streets (see drawing of approved development plan) result in speed reduction which lowers noise intensity. As a consequence of low traffic volumes, its residential streets show low air pollution levels. The high walking levels registered by the fused grid layout, mentioned above, indicate the potential of increased physical activity.

In addition to these three factors that may impact on resident's health – noise, air quality, and physical activity – a fourth one, proximity to natural open spaces, has emerged as a significant contributor. Previous studies have confirmed the beneficial effect of frequent contact with nature and some have investigated the probable mechanism of the effect via stress abating biochemical processes. More recently, links were established to specific biota (microorganisms) found in nature and their direct influence on building immune system strength. From these studies it can be inferred that a neighbourhood layout based on the fused grid model may confer these health and well-being benefits to residents because it incorporates green open spaces as integral parts of its pedestrian circulation network. Inclusion of green spaces is possible in any layout as an option; in the fused grid it is a necessary component of its configuration.

=== Site adaptability ===
The virtual grid mesh that underlies the fused grid network structure is expressed at 400 m intervals, five times the size of the traditional city block (about 80 m). At this scale there is greater flexibility to adapt the network elements to the topography and to specific site boundary constraints that are common in property configurations. Within the 16 ha quadrant, the discontinuous character of the streets and the possible combination of cul-de-sac and loop types provide sufficient latitude to the site plan designer to lay out an adapted version of the fused grid. There are at least 15 variations of the quadrant design that can be moulded to fit specific conditions. The site adaptability of the model has been demonstrated in the two approved layout plans.

=== Ground permeability ===
One study quantified the relative permeability of three alternative site plans for the same site. The analysis results show that the impermeable areas of the three layouts – assuming roads, building foot prints and sidewalks to be impervious surfaces – ranged from 34.7% of fused grid to 35.8% of the conventional suburban to 39% of the grid-like pattern. Streets were the single most influential factor in the amount of the water runoff. They account for an impermeable surface which is up to three times that of the building footprint. Of the total impermeable area in the three layouts the portion attributable to streets ranges from 48 to 65 percent with the fused grid occupying the low end. The reduction in street length and the systematic use of open spaces as structural elements of the layout increase the potential of greater water permeability in the Fused Grid.

=== Development and municipal costs ===
A study compared the cost efficiency of three network patterns in improving the traffic performance of a district. It first established the cost of the network system of each before evaluating the efficiency ratio for the resulting traffic improvement. The analysis showed that the most significant capital cost of development is for roads. The conventional layout has the lowest capital costs for roads followed by the fused grid at 12% higher and the Neo-traditional (grid) layout at 46% higher. When considering the opportunity cost for land dedicated to right-of-ways (ROW), the fused grid allocated 9% more land to roads than the conventional grid, while the neo-traditional grid allocated 43% more. Similar to capital costs, roads remain the key cost component of community development after accounting for on-going operations, maintenance, and replacement costs.

The study showed that there are significant differences in costs related to travel delay for the total road network particularly at the desirable transit-supportive densities. The delay costs incurred by the conventional layout are 12% higher than the fused grid followed by the Neotraditional grid at 3% higher. The conventional layout is less cost-efficient than the fused grid network since they have similar infrastructure costs but the latter delivers significant savings in travel time costs. The travel time benefits of the neo-traditional grid layout are disproportional to the required infrastructure investment. The obvious benefits of saving time for pedestrians and the enticement of more walking have not so far been monetized.

== Applications of the fused grid ==
Retroactive application of the fused grid model can be seen in the centres of old European cities, such as Munich, Essen, and Freiburg and in newer railway towns or suburbs such as Vauban, Freiburg and Houten in the Netherlands. In most of these cases, acknowledging the constrains of an existing built environment, the key fused grid characteristic of a traffic impermeable centre is evident along with the primacy and continuity of pedestrian-only links to the remainder of the inherited street system. The fused grid is promoted in Canada by the Canada Mortgage and Housing Corporation.

A similar debate has also been taking place in Europe and particularly the UK, where the term filtered permeability was coined to describe urban layouts which maximise ease of movement for pedestrians and cyclists, but seek to restrain it for motor vehicles.

== See also ==
- Dead end (street) – Street with only one way in and out
- Permeability (spatial and transport planning) – Freedom of movement of traffic
- Low traffic neighbourhood – Urban planning concept
- Fifteen minute city – Urban accessibility concept
