= Street hierarchy =

Urban planning restricting through traffic of automobiles

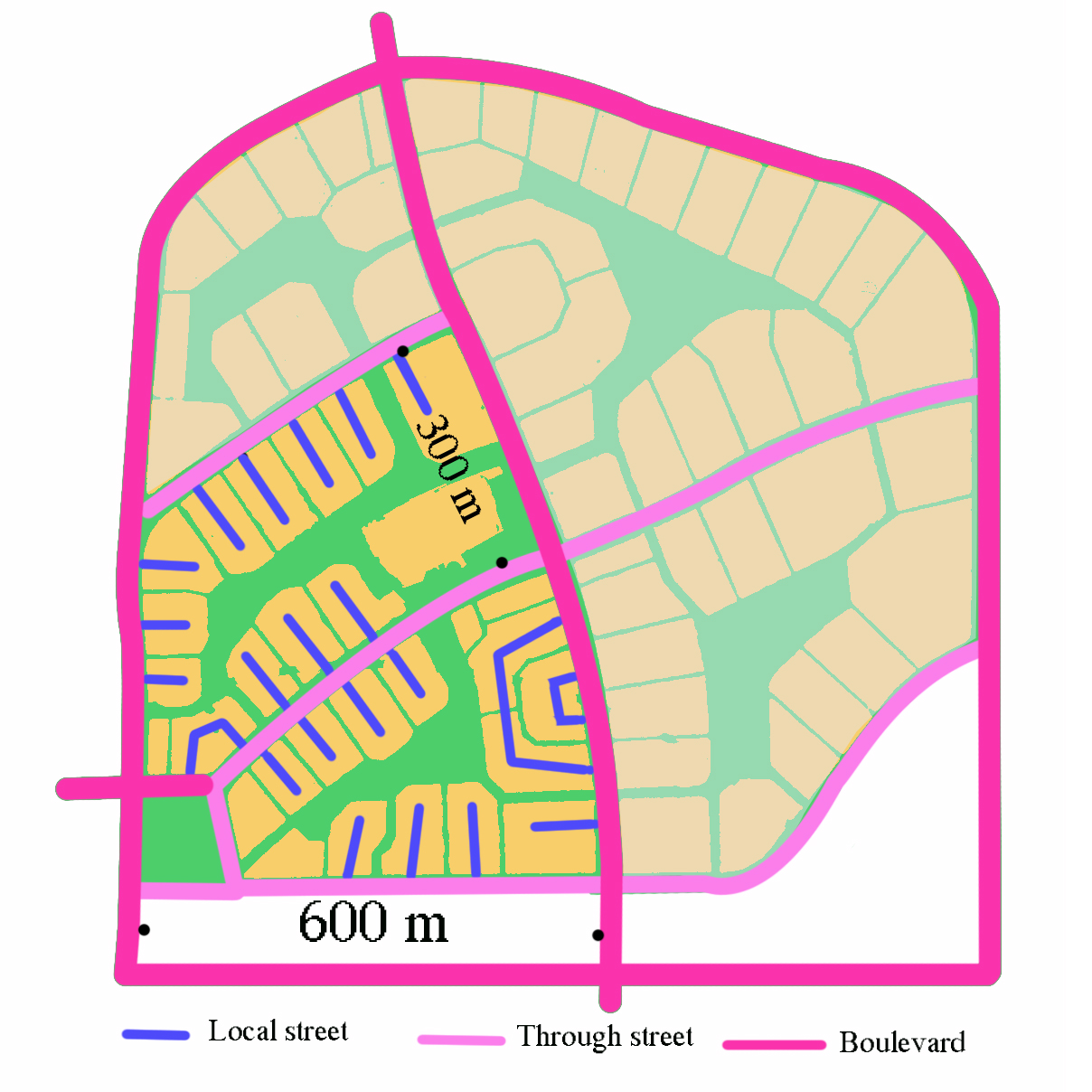
The network structure of Radburn, New Jersey exemplifies the concept of street hierarchy of contemporary districts. (The shaded area was not built.)

The street hierarchy is an urban planning technique for laying out road networks that exclude automobile through-traffic from developed areas. It is conceived as a hierarchy of roads that embeds the link importance of each road type in the network topology (the connectivity of the nodes to each other). Street hierarchy restricts or eliminates direct connections between certain types of links, for example residential streets and arterial roads, and allows connections between similar order streets (e.g. arterial to arterial) or between street types that are separated by one level in the hierarchy (e.g. arterial to highway and collector to arterial). By contrast, in many regular, traditional grid plans, as laid out, higher order roads (e.g. arterials) are connected by through streets of both lower order levels (e.g. local and collector). An ordering of roads and their classification can include several levels and finer distinctions as, for example, major and minor arterials or collectors.

At the lowest level of the hierarchy, cul-de-sac streets, by definition non-connecting, link with the next order street, a primary or secondary "collector"—either a ring road that surrounds a neighbourhood, or a curvilinear "front-to-back" path—which in turn links with the arterial. Arterials then link with the intercity highways at strictly specified intervals at intersections that are either signalized or grade separated.

In places where grid networks were laid out in the pre-automotive 19th century, such as in the American Midwest, larger subdivisions have adopted a partial hierarchy, with two to five entrances off one or two main roads (arterials) thus limiting the links between them and, consequently, traffic through the neighbourhood.

Since the 1960s, street hierarchy has been the dominant network configuration of suburbs and exurbs in the United States, Canada, Australia, and the UK. It is less popular in Latin America, Western Europe, and China.

Large subdivisions may have three- or even four-tiered hierarchies, feeding into one or two wide arterials, which can be as wide as the ten lane Champs-Élysées or Wilshire Boulevard. Arterials at this level of traffic volume generally require no fewer than four lanes in width; and in large contemporary suburbs, such as Naperville, Illinois, or Irvine, California, are often eight or ten lanes wide. Adjacent street hierarchies are rarely connected to one another.

== History ==
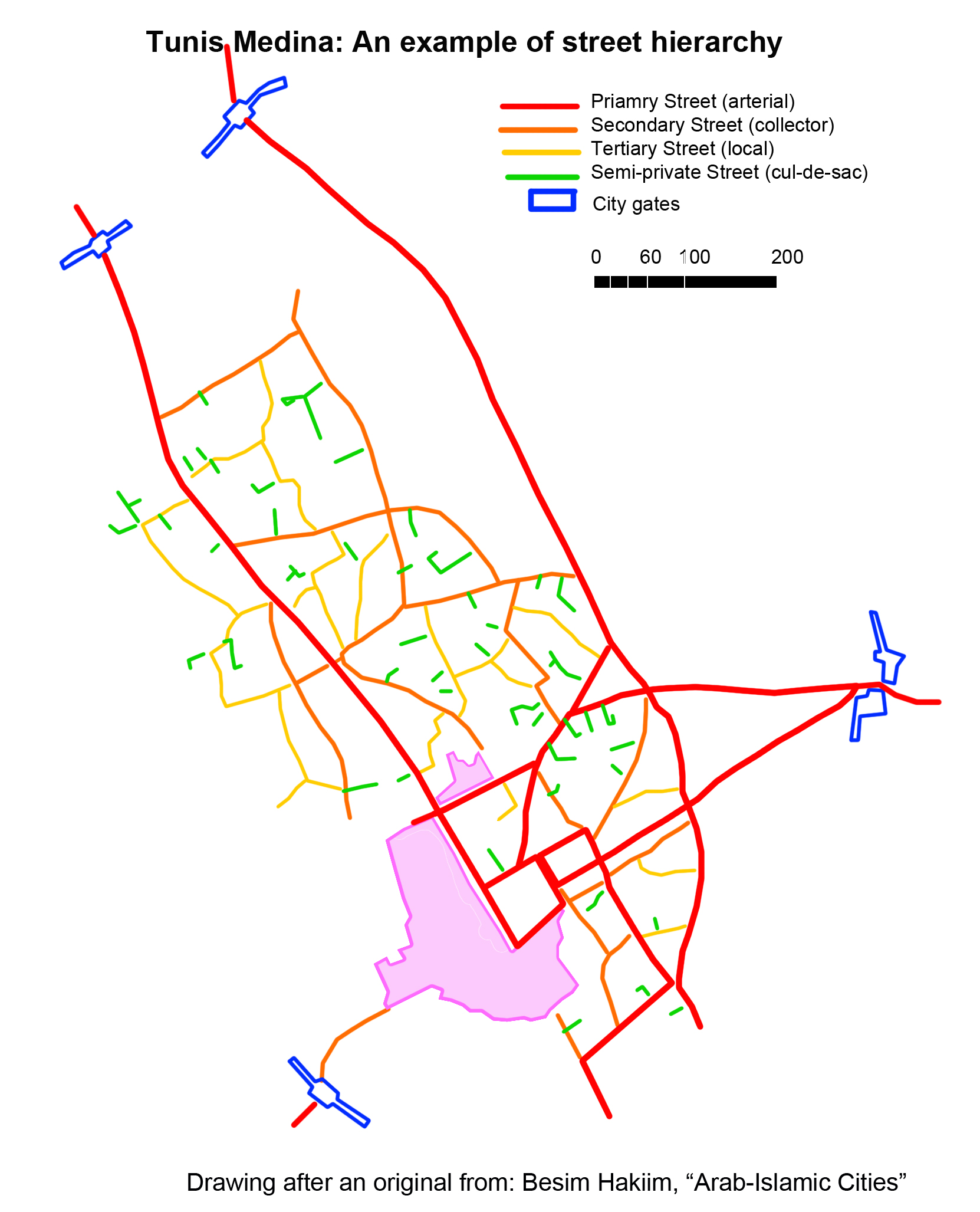
Hierarchical street network in the Medina of Tunis includes culs-de-sac (green), local streets (yellow), collectors (orange), and arterials (red) linking the gates to the city centre.

In the pre-automotive era of cities, traces of the concept of a hierarchy of streets in a network appear in Greek and subsequent Roman town plans. The main feature of their classification is their size. In Roman cities, such as Pompeii, major thoroughfares (e.g. the decumanus) had a width of 12.2 m, secondary streets (e.g. the cardo) 6 m and tertiary streets (e.g. vicinae) measured 4.5 meters. The first allowed for two way cart traffic, the second generally only one, while the third only loaded animals. Narrower streets that could only accommodate pedestrians were also present in both Greek and Roman cities. Thus the restriction on connections between major streets on particular modes (carts and chariots) was the effect of the width of the street itself and not the lack of linkage. This method is akin to the contemporary concept of filtered permeability.

A clearer record of a stricter hierarchical order of streets appears in surviving and functioning Arabic-Islamic cities that originate in the late first millennium AD such as the Medina of Tunis, Marrakesh, Fez, and Damascus. These cases feature four classes of streets starting with the cul-de-sac type (1.84-2.00 m wide) and moving up to the local (third order connector), then a collector that usually surrounds a residential quarter (second order connector) and, finally, to the first order connector (arterial). The latter connector usually crossed the city through its centre and led to the city gates (see drawing). These arterials were decreed to be at least wide enough for two crossing loaded animals, 3.23 to 3.5 m. This tendency for hierarchical organization of streets was so pervasive in the Arab-Islamic tradition that even cities that were laid out on a uniform grid by Greeks or Romans, were transformed by their subsequent Islamic conquerors and residents, as in the case of Damascus.

In the automotive 20th century, the street hierarchy concept was first elaborated by Ludwig Hilberseimer, in his City Plan of 1927. His major priorities were increasing the safety of primary school-age children walking to school, and increasing the speed of traffic.

Planners also began to modify the grid into a superblock system, where high traffic generators such as shops and apartments were placed on arterial roads that formed the boundaries of the superblock. Schools, churches, and parks were located at the center, and houses filled the residential blocks. Within the superblock, T-intersections, and culs-de-sac acted as traffic calming devices, slowing or preventing through traffic.

This model prevailed between roughly 1930 and 1955, in "instant cities" such as Lakewood, California, and the Los Angeles district of Panorama City. The street hierarchy has been the dominant model for network layout in new suburbs since the Levittowns.

In the 1960s, when operations research and rational planning were the prevailing analytical tools, street hierarchy was seen as a major improvement over the regular, undifferentiated, "messy" grid system. It discouraged dangerous high-speed driving and street racing in residential areas. New master-planned suburbs often codified the street hierarchy into their zoning laws, restricting the use of grid layouts in residential districts.

Eventually, the street hierarchy was also adapted for industrial parks and commercial developments. Use of the street hierarchy is a nearly universal characteristic of the "edge city", a roughly post-1970 form of urban development exemplified by places such as Tysons Corner, Virginia, and Schaumburg, Illinois.

== Criticisms and discussion ==
Social commentators and urban planners have often pointed out that the street hierarchy arrangement has serious limitations. These criticisms are generally part of a broader indictment of mid-20th-century urban planning, with critics charging that planners have only considered the needs of young children and their working-age parents in creating the spatial arrangement of the late 20th and early 21st centuries.

=== Financial costs ===
Some planners and economists consider the street hierarchy to be financially wasteful, since it requires more miles of street to be laid than a grid plan to serve a much smaller population.

While housing unit density and, consequently, population density affects the per capita cost of infrastructure, it is not inextricably linked to the street network pattern whether hierarchical or uniform. Theoretically and historically a city block can be built at high or low density, depending on the urban context and land value; central locations command much higher land prices than suburban. The costs for street infrastructure depend largely on four variables: street width (or Right of Way), street length, block width, and pavement width. These variables affect the total street length of a neighbourhood and the proportion of land area it consumes. Street length increases costs proportionately while street area represents an opportunity cost of land unavailable for development. Studies show that regular, undifferentiated grid patterns generally incur infrastructure costs about 20 to 30 percent higher than the discontinuous hierarchical street patterns, reflecting an analogous street length increase.

In suburban areas subject to property tax caps such as California's Prop 13, the enormous per-capita expenditures required to maintain streets mean that only houses costing over half a million dollars can provide enough property tax revenue to cover the cost of maintaining their street hierarchies. In areas with low developer impact fees, cities often fail to provide adequate maintenance of internal and arterial roads serving newly constructed subdivisions. Municipal records show that street maintenance represents a large portion of a municipal budget, particularly in Northern climates where snow removal is added to the regular lifecycle upkeep. Two planning strategies have been suggested to deal with these costs in new developments: reduction of street length or increase in household density, or a combination of the two. Of the two strategies, reducing street length is the most effective and permanent; densities can vary over time and cannot be effectively controlled.

=== Pedestrian degradation ===
New Urbanists decry the street hierarchy's deleterious effects on pedestrian travel, which is made easy and pleasant within the subdivision but is virtually impossible outside it. Residential subdivisions usually have no pedestrian connections between themselves and adjacent commercial areas, and are often separated from them by high masonry walls intended to block noise. New Urbanist writers like Andres Duany and James Howard Kunstler often point out the absurd nature of car trips forced by the street hierarchy: while a grocery store may be less than a quarter-mile distant physically from a given home in a subdivision, the barriers to pedestrian travel presented by the street hierarchy mean that getting a gallon of milk requires a car trip of a mile or more in each direction. Jane Jacobs, among other commentators, has gone so far as to say that modern suburban design—of which the street hierarchy is the key component—is a major factor in the sedentary lifestyle of today's children. Mass transit advocates contend that the street hierarchy's denigration of pedestrian traffic also reduces the viability of public transportation in areas where it prevails, sharply curtailing the mobility of those who do not own cars or cannot drive them, such as disabled persons, teenagers, and the elderly.

=== Traffic issues ===
==== Congestion causes and remedies ====
Most traffic engineers consider the street hierarchy to be optimal, since it eliminates through traffic on all streets except arterials. However, some have contended that it actually exacerbates traffic congestion, leading to air pollution and other undesirable outcomes. An alternative to street hierarchy, Traditional Neighborhood Development (TND) networks, recommended by the Institute of Traffic Engineers, implies that a type of hierarchy is desirable nonetheless. It suggests that "While TND street networks do not follow the same rigid functional classification of conventional neighborhoods with local, collector, arterial and other streets, TND streets are hierarchical to facilitate necessary movements."

A more precise image of the prevalent thinking about structuring road networks can be found in the 2006 ITE/CNU recommended practice for the design of urban thoroughfares. In it, the functional, traffic-engineering classifications of roads are replaced by three basic road types: boulevard, avenue and street with the addition of a second type of boulevard – the multi-way. These road types reflect familiar names and images of roads and also real conditions in an urban environment, where each type normally performs multiple functions but only up to a hierarchical limit. For example, a boulevard can function as a principal and minor arterial but not as a collector or local access street; an avenue, as principal/minor arterial and a collector but not as a street; while a street can serve as minor arterial, a collector and a local (access road) but not as a principal arterial. These exclusions of functional roles derive from the design intention to put an emphasis either on mobility or access; both cannot be accommodated concurrently in every case.

These hierarchical distinctions of road types become clearer when considering the recommended design specifications for the number of through lanes, design speed, intersection spacing and driveway access. As the number of lanes increase from two to four and then six and, correspondingly, the operating speed from 40 km/h to about 60 km/h, the intersection spacing increases from a 90–200 m range to its double (200–400 m). Similarly, the restriction on driveway access becomes more stringent and, in effect, impossible in the case of a required raised median for boulevards and multi-way boulevards. Thus a multi-way and simple boulevard (corresponding to the functional definition of arterial) are deemed to perform their mobility function better when access to them is limited to intervals between 200 and 400 m, that is every three to five normal, 80-m-wide city blocks.

A common practice in conventional subdivision design is a road pattern that limits access to the arterials (or boulevards) to few points of entry and exit. These choke points produce traffic congestion in large subdivisions at rush hour periods. Congestion also increases on the boulevard (regional arterial) if the access restrictions are not observed. Furthermore, congestion can be density-dependent in addition to being configuration-dependent. That is, the same geometric configuration ideally suited to improve traffic flow, roundabouts for example, fails to function adequately beyond a certain threshold of traffic volume. Increased traffic volume is a direct outcome of increased household density of a district.

These relationships of congestion to layout geometry and density have been tested in two studies using computer-based traffic modeling applied to large subdivisions. A 1990 study compared the traffic performance in a 700-acre (2.8-km^{2}) development that was laid out using two approaches, one with a hierarchical street layout that included cul-de-sac streets and the other a Traditional Neighborhood Design street layout. The study concluded that the non-hierarchical, traditional layout generally shows lower peak speed and shorter, more frequent intersection delays than the hierarchical pattern. The traditional pattern is not as friendly as the hierarchical to long trips but friendlier to short trips. Local trips in it are shorter in distance but about equivalent in time with the hierarchical layout.

A later more extensive comparative traffic study of an 830-acre (3.4-km^{2}) subdivision tested three types of layouts: conventional, TND, and Fused Grid. It also tested the resilience of all three layouts to an increased traffic load generated by increased residential densities. The study concluded that all types of layouts perform adequately in most low to moderate population density scenarios up to a certain threshold of 62 persons per hectare (ppha). As densities increased beyond the threshold so did travel time. At a 50% density increase to 90 ppha, the conventional hierarchical pattern showed the highest increase in travel time (20%), followed by the TND (13%) and the fused grid (5%). When the density increased further to include one local job per two residents, delays increased respectively by 139%, 90% and 71% for the conventional, traditional, and fused grid. This confirms the density influence on congestion levels and that a hierarchical pattern can improve flow if laid out following the access restrictions proposed in the ITE/CNU practice guide.

In edge cities the number of cars exiting a large subdivision to an arterial that links to a highway can be extremely high, leading to miles-long queues to get on freeway ramps nearby. See Rat running.

==== Safety ====
Transportation planners and traffic engineers have expressed concerns over the traffic safety drawbacks presented by the street hierarchy. Recent studies have found higher traffic fatality rates in outlying suburban areas than in central cities and inner suburbs with smaller blocks and more-connected street patterns. While some of this disparity is the result of distance from emergency medical facilities (hospitals are usually not built in a newly developed suburban area until a fairly late stage in its development), it is clear that the higher speeds engendered by the street hierarchy increase the severity of accidents occurring along arterial roads.

An earlier study found significant differences in recorded accidents between residential neighbourhoods that were laid out on an undifferentiated grid and those that included culs-de-sac and crescents in a hierarchical structure. The frequency of accidents was significantly higher in the grid neighbourhoods.

Two newer studies examined the frequency of collisions in two regional districts using the latest analytical tools. They investigated the potential correlation between street network patterns and frequency of collisions. In one study, cul-de-sac hierarchical networks appeared to be much safer than the uniform grid networks, by nearly three to one. A second study found the grid plan to be the least safe by a significant margin with respect to all other street patterns.

A 2009 study suggests that land use patterns play a significant role in traffic safety and should be considered in conjunction with the network pattern. While all intersection types in general reduce the incidence of fatal crashes, four-way intersections, which occur regularly in a uniform grid, increase total and injurious crashes significantly. The study recommends hybrid street networks with dense concentrations of T-intersections and concludes that a return to the 19th century gridiron is undesirable.

=== Banning on-street parking ===
Banning on-street parking can provide social benefits if the car users and the general public pay for off-street parking.

== Future prospects ==
=== United States ===
While street hierarchies remain the default mode of suburban design in the United States, its 21st century usefulness depends on the prevalence of low density developments. To the degree that developable land becomes scarce in coastal urban areas and in geographically constrained inland cities such as Tucson, Las Vegas, and Salt Lake City, the street hierarchy's inability to handle any but the lowest population densities is a long-term liability. The street hierarchy is also unpopular in the coastal city of New Orleans because of its geographic barriers, and because like Philadelphia, New York, and Cleveland, New Orleans already had suburbs before the new design became popular. Grids were used in New Orleans to fit a population that had at one time reached over 700,000 into 180 square miles (470 km^{2}) of land with over 20 percent of that number being dedicated to uninhabitable wetlands. There a street hierarchy took up too much space to be economical. Real estate developers in areas with high land prices, such as Southern California's Inland Empire, are finding that the relatively high population density of contemporary subdivisions is leading to severe traffic congestion on arterial roads that were country lanes a decade earlier. The street hierarchy is also becoming less attractive as awareness increases of the environmental consequences of the urban planning paradigm of which it is an integral part. The "smart growth" movement calls for street patterns with a high degree of connectivity, and with it a more balanced provision for various travel modes, both vehicular and non-vehicular.

=== Europe ===
The 1967 design of Milton Keynes, with its (national speed limit) grid roads at 1 km intervals containing 'organic' road lay-out grid-squares, was strongly founded on the 'street hierarchy' principle. The 2006 expansion plans for Milton Keynes will abandon this model in favour of "mixed-use traditional British city streets".

=== Developing countries ===
In countries such as India, where automobile ownership is increasing at double-digit annual rates, the street hierarchy is becoming increasingly popular as suburban development takes on forms strongly resembling those of American exurbs. However, the suburban-like cities in China are the aftermath of excessive implementing hierarchical street-layout and rapid urban development. With high-rise residential towers, over-engineered roads and public transportation systems, they are distinctively different from American suburbs. The street hierarchy theory forms the center of the Chinese planning system which was adapted from ex-soviet in 60's. Today, Chinese planning schools are continuing to teach the theory unaware of its effects on the suburbanization, congestion and wasteful road-engineering.

== See also ==
- Complete streets
- Green transport hierarchy
- Road hierarchy
- Main Street
- Pedestrian zone – Urban car-free area reserved for pedestrian use
- Permeability (spatial and transport planning) – Freedom of movement of traffic
- Radial route
- Ring road
- Settlement hierarchy
- Side road
- Transit desert
- Transit mall
- Types of road
